= School bus =

Bus operated by a school district for student transport

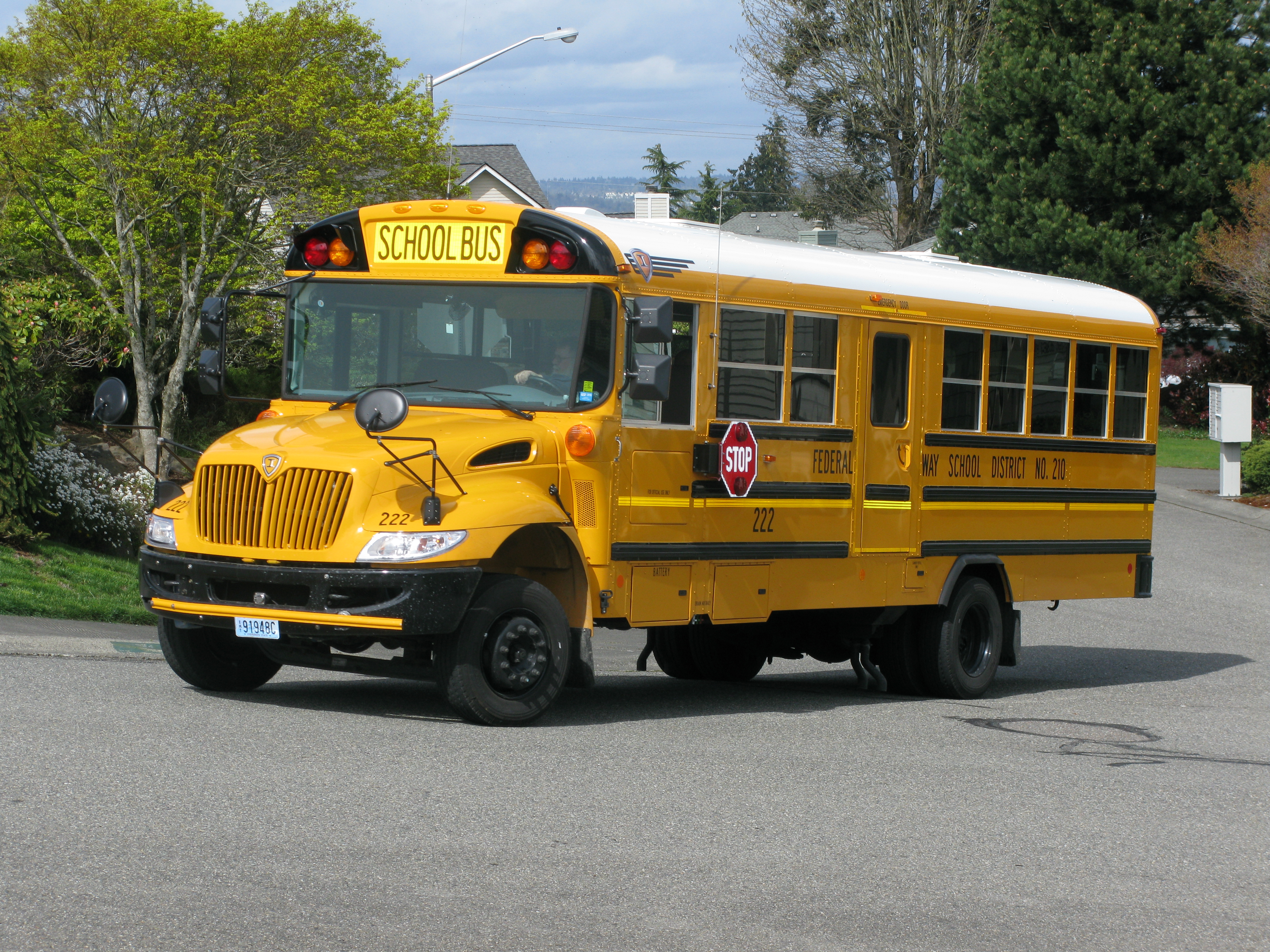
- 2010 IC CE
- Classification: Vehicle
- Application: Transportation
- Wheels: 4–6
- Axles: 2

A school bus is any type of bus owned, leased, contracted to, or operated by a school or school district. It is regularly used to transport students to and from school or school-related activities, but not including a charter bus or transit bus. Various configurations of school buses are used worldwide; the most iconic examples are the yellow school buses of the United States which are also found in other parts of the world, including Canada.

In North America, school buses are purpose-built vehicles distinguished from other types of buses by design characteristics mandated by federal and state/provincial regulations. In addition to their distinct paint color (National School Bus Glossy Yellow), school buses are fitted with exterior warning lights (to give them traffic priority) and multiple safety devices.

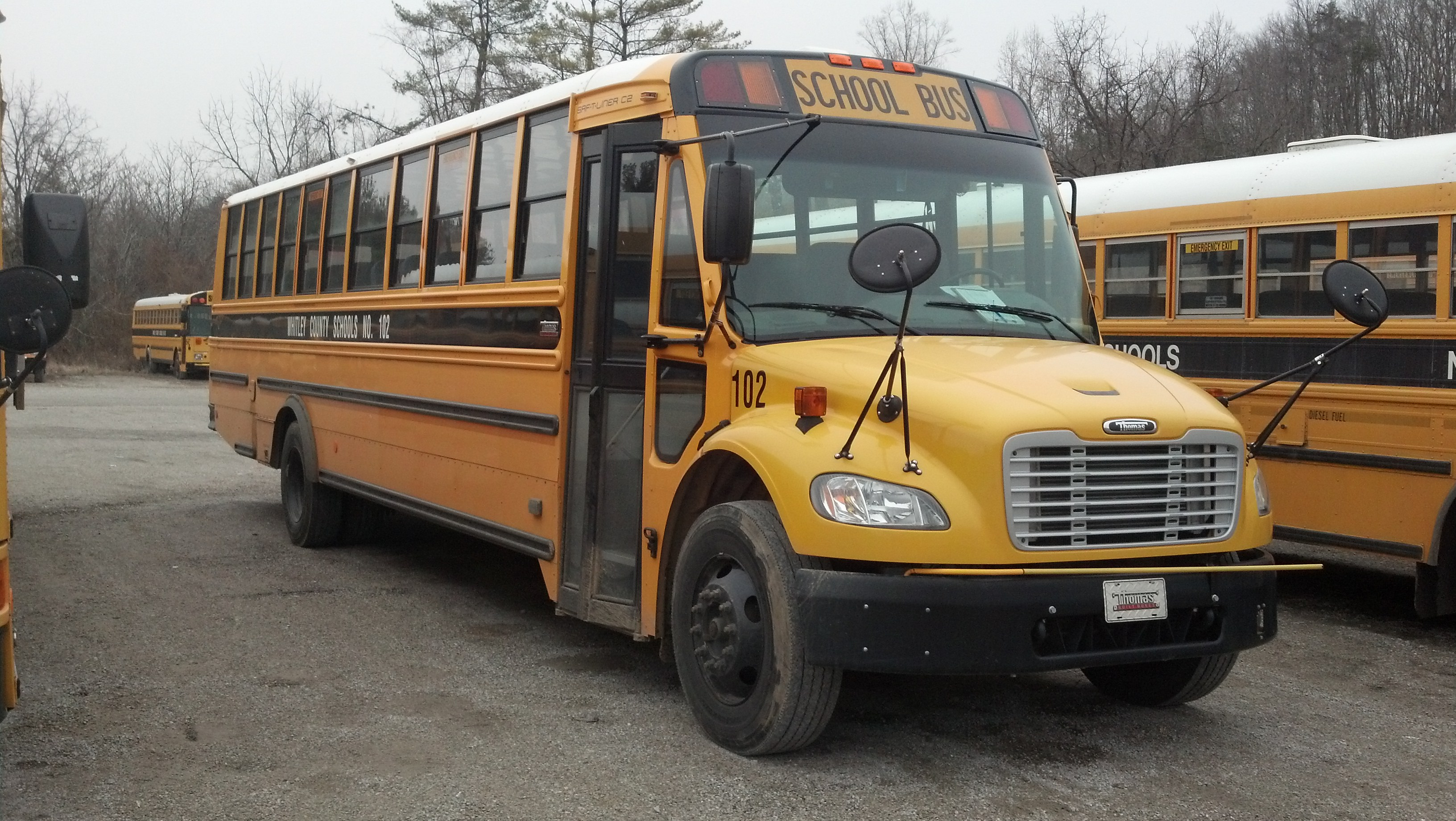

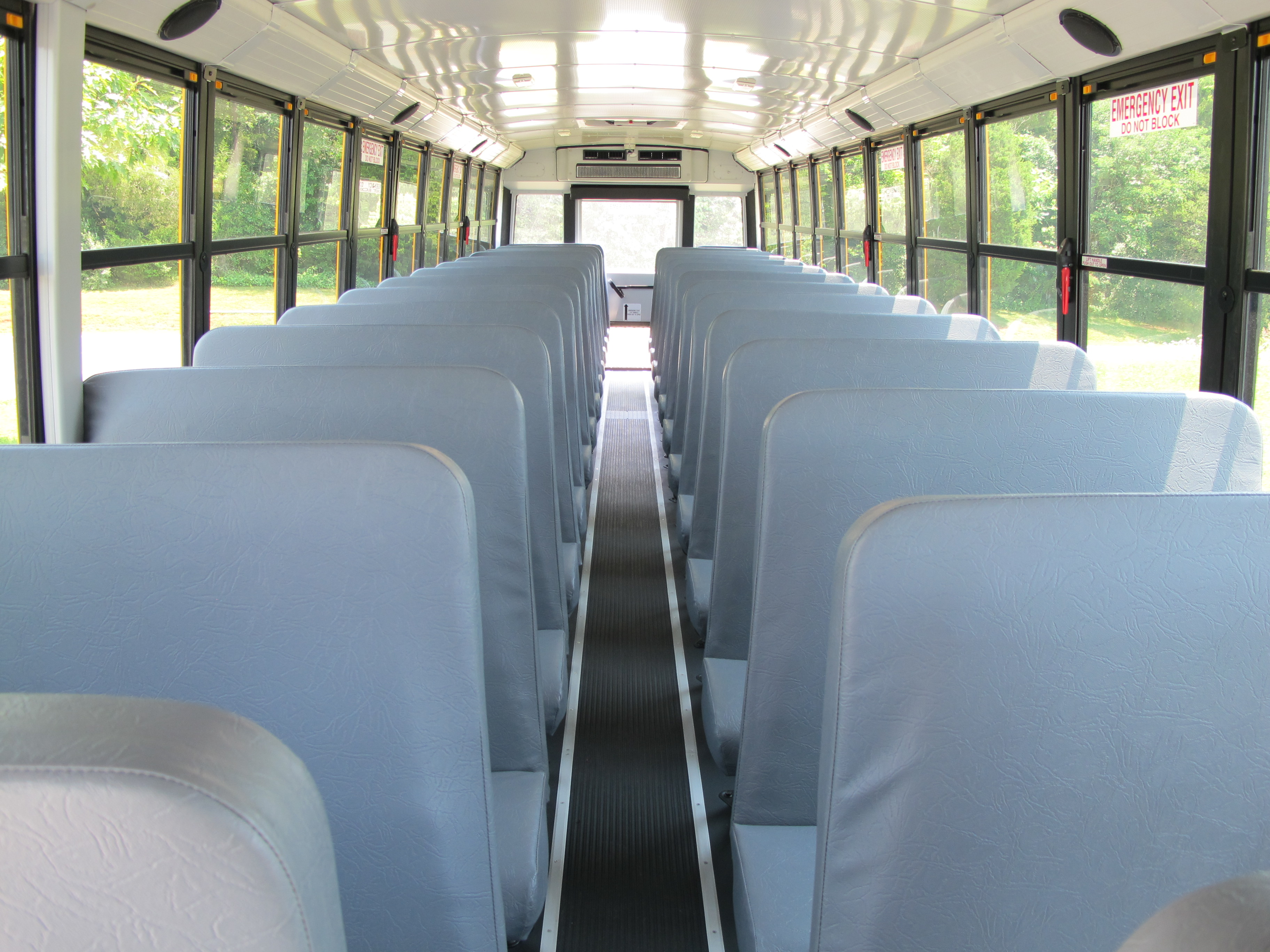
A Thomas Saf-T-Liner C2 school bus, with its exterior (top) and interior (bottom) shown

== Design history ==
=== 19th century ===
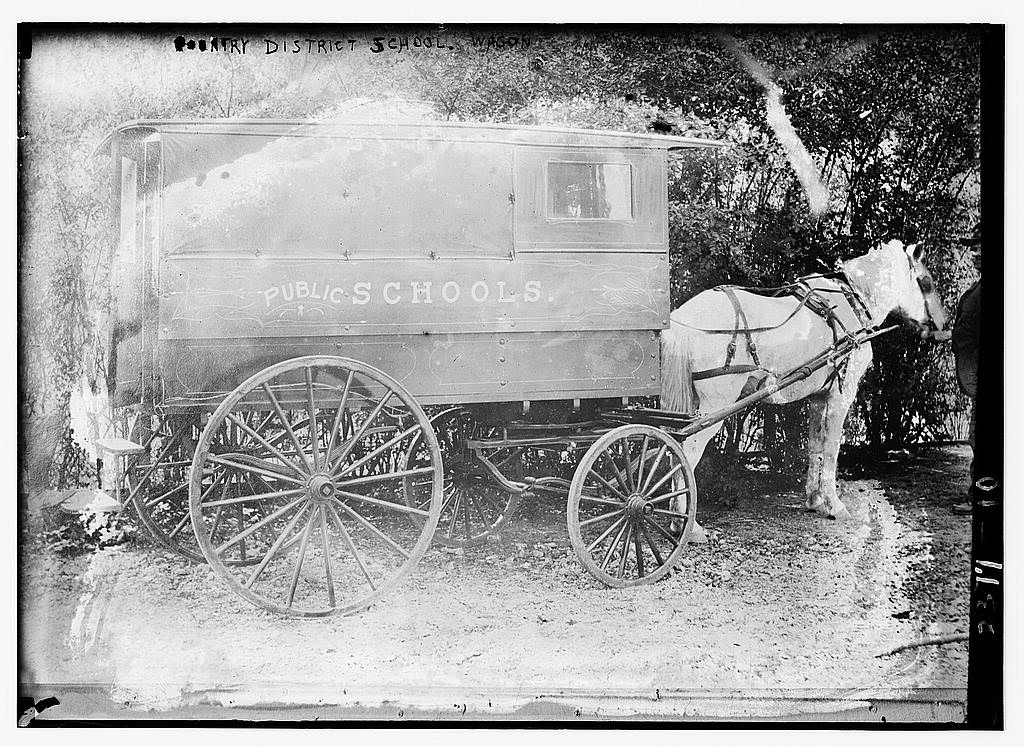
One-horse kid hack (Early 1910s)

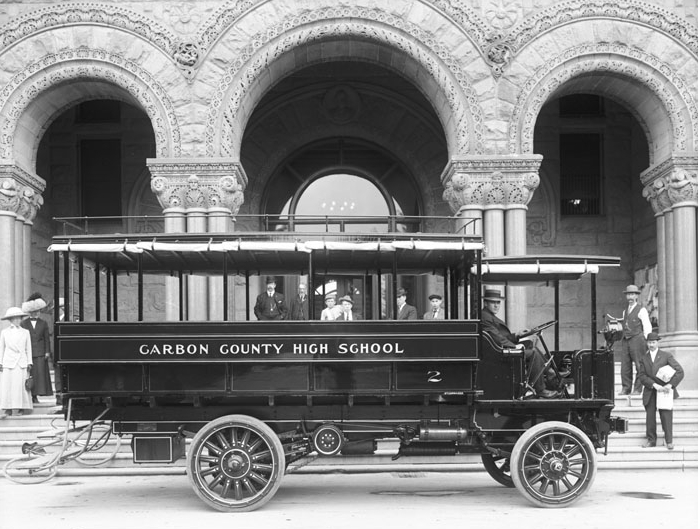
A 1912 Studebaker truck with a school bus body

In the second half of the 19th century, many rural areas of the United States and Canada were served by one-room schools. For those students who lived beyond practical walking distance from school, transportation was facilitated in the form of the kid hack; at the time, "hack" was a term referring to certain types of horse-drawn carriages. Essentially re-purposed farm wagons, kid hacks were open to the elements, with little to no weather protection.

In 1892, Indiana-based Wayne Works (later Wayne Corporation) produced its first "school car" A purpose-built design, the school car was constructed with perimeter-mounted wooden bench seats and a roof (the sides remained open). As a horse-drawn wagon, the school car was fitted with a rear entrance door (intended to avoid startling the horses while loading or unloading passengers); over a century later, the design remains in use (as an emergency exit).

In 1869, Massachusetts became the first state to add transportation to public education; by 1900, 16 other states would transport students to school.

=== 1900–1930 ===
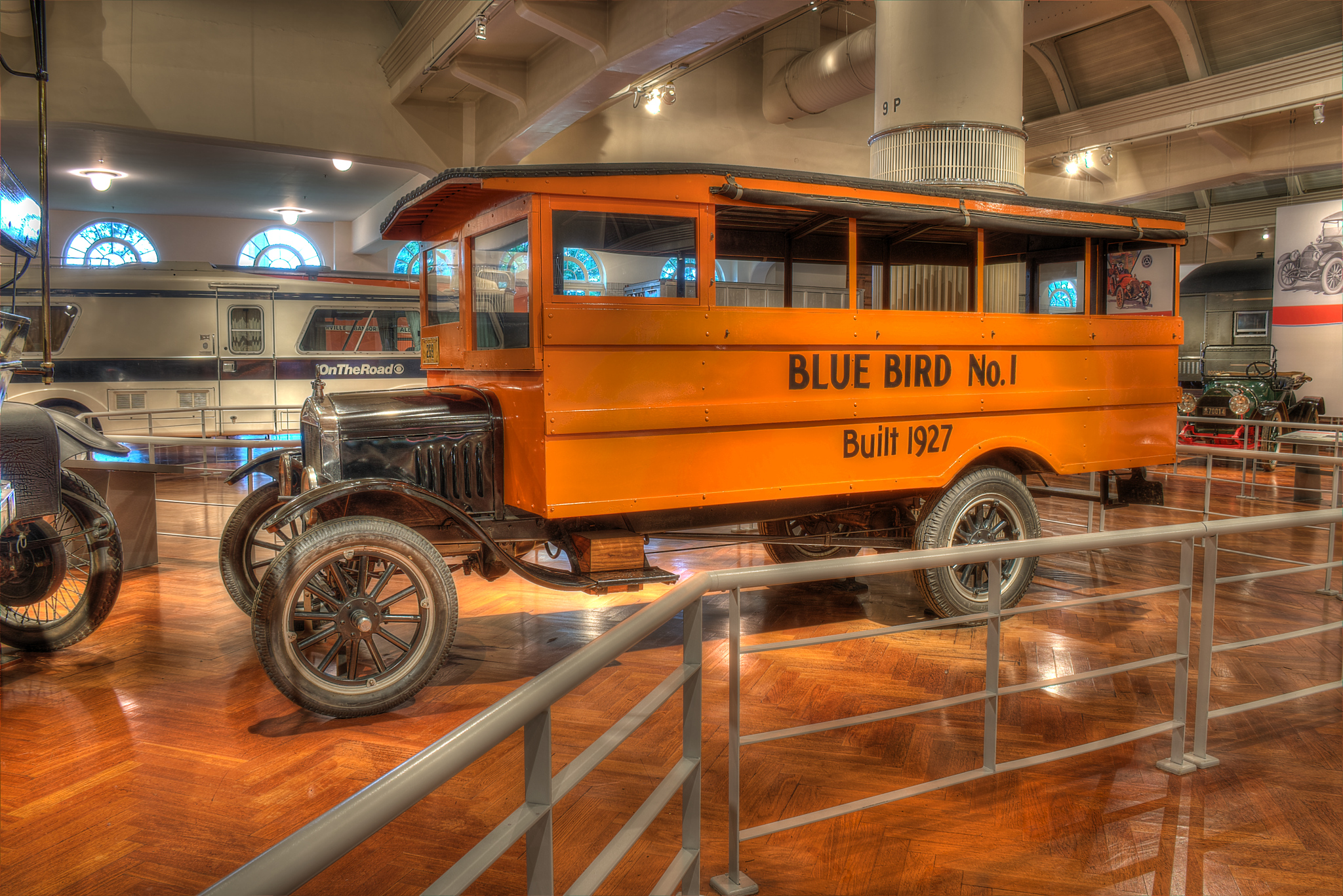
"Blue Bird No. 1", the first bus constructed by A.L. Luce, founder of the Blue Bird Body Company. It is based on a 1927 Ford Model T chassis.

Following the first decade of the twentieth century, several developments would affect the design of the school bus and student transport. As vehicles evolved from horse-drawn to "horseless" propulsion on a wider basis, the wagon bodies of kid hacks and school cars were adapted to truck frames. While transitioning into purpose-built designs, a number of features from wagons were retained, including wood construction, perimeter bench seating, and rear entry doors. Weather protection remained minimal; some designs adopted a tarpaulin stretched above the passenger seating.

In 1915, International Harvester constructed its first school bus; today, its successor company Navistar still produces school bus cowled chassis.

In 1919, the usage of school buses became funded in all 48 US states.

In 1927, Ford dealership owner A.L. Luce produced a bus body for a 1927 Ford Model T. The forerunner of the first Blue Bird school buses, steel was used to panel and frame the bus body; wood was relegated to a secondary material. While fitted with a roof, the primary weather protection of the Luce bus design included roll-up canvas side curtains.

=== 1930s ===
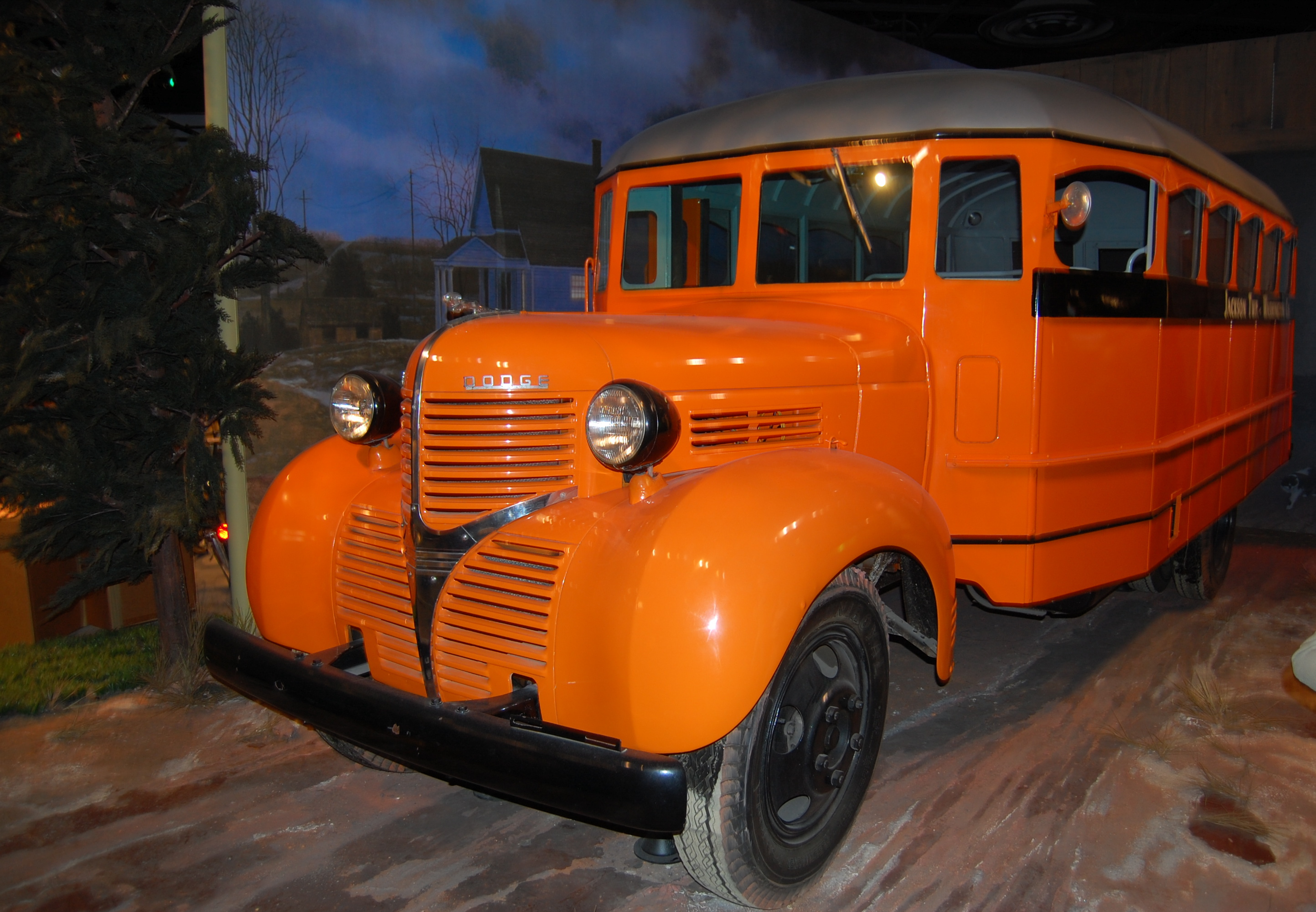
A 1939 school bus seen in a museum display. Its orange color predates the adoption of school bus yellow.

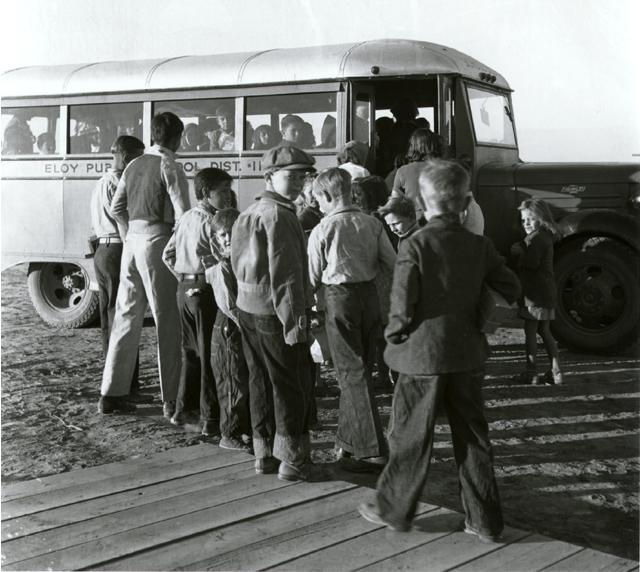
Late 1930s school bus

During the 1930s, school buses saw advances in their design and production that remain in use to this day. To better adapt to an automotive chassis, the entry door of a school bus was relocated from the rear of the body to the front curbside. Along with becoming a driver-operated design, a side-mounted door improved forward visibility and eased the loading/unloading of passengers. The center-mounted rear door was repurposed as a design feature, remaining as an emergency exit.

Following the introduction of the steel-paneled 1927 Luce bus, school bus manufacturing began to transition towards all-steel construction. In 1930, both Superior and Wayne introduced all-steel school buses; the latter introduced safety glass windows for its bus body.

As school bus design paralleled the design of light to medium-duty commercial trucks of the time, the advent of forward-control trucks would have their own influence on school bus design. In an effort to gain extra seating capacity and visibility, Crown Coach built its own cabover school bus design from the ground up. Introduced in 1932, the Crown Supercoach seated up to 76 passengers, the highest-capacity school bus of the time.

As the 1930s progressed, flat-front school buses began to follow motorcoach design in styling as well as engineering, gradually adopting the term "transit-style" for their appearance. In 1940, the first mid-engined transit school bus was produced by Gillig in California.

==== Developing production standards ====
The custom-built nature of school buses created an inherent obstacle to their profitable mass production on a large scale. Although school bus design had moved away from the wagon-style kid hacks of the generation before, there was not yet a recognized set of industry-wide standards for school buses.

In 1939, rural education expert Dr. Frank W. Cyr organized a week-long conference at Teachers College, Columbia University that introduced new standards for the design of school buses. Funded by a $5,000 grant, Dr. Cyr invited transportation officials, representatives from body and chassis manufacturers, and paint companies. To reduce the complexity of school bus production and increase safety, a set of 44 standards were agreed upon and adopted by the attendees (such as interior and exterior dimensions and the forward-facing seating configuration). To allow for large-scale production of school buses among body manufacturers, adoption of these standards allowed for greater consistency among body manufacturers.

While many of the standards of the 1939 conference have been modified or updated, one part of its legacy remains a key part of every school bus in North America today: the adoption of a standard paint color for all school buses. While technically named "National School Bus Glossy Yellow", school bus yellow was adopted for use since it was considered easiest to see in dawn and dusk, and it contrasted well with black lettering. While not universally used worldwide, yellow has become the shade most commonly associated with school buses both in North America and abroad.

=== 1940s ===
During World War II, school bus manufacturers converted to military production, manufacturing buses and license-built trucks for the military. Following the war, school bus operation would see a number of changes, following developments within education systems.

Following WWII and the rise of suburban growth in North America, demand for school busing increased outside of rural areas; in suburbs and larger urban areas, community design often made walking to school impractical beyond a certain distance from home (particularly as students progressed into high school). In all but the most isolated areas, one-room schools from the turn of the century had become phased out in favor of multi-grade schools introduced in urban areas. In another change, school districts shifted bus operation from buses operated by single individuals to district-owned fleets (operated by district employees).

=== 1950s–1960s ===
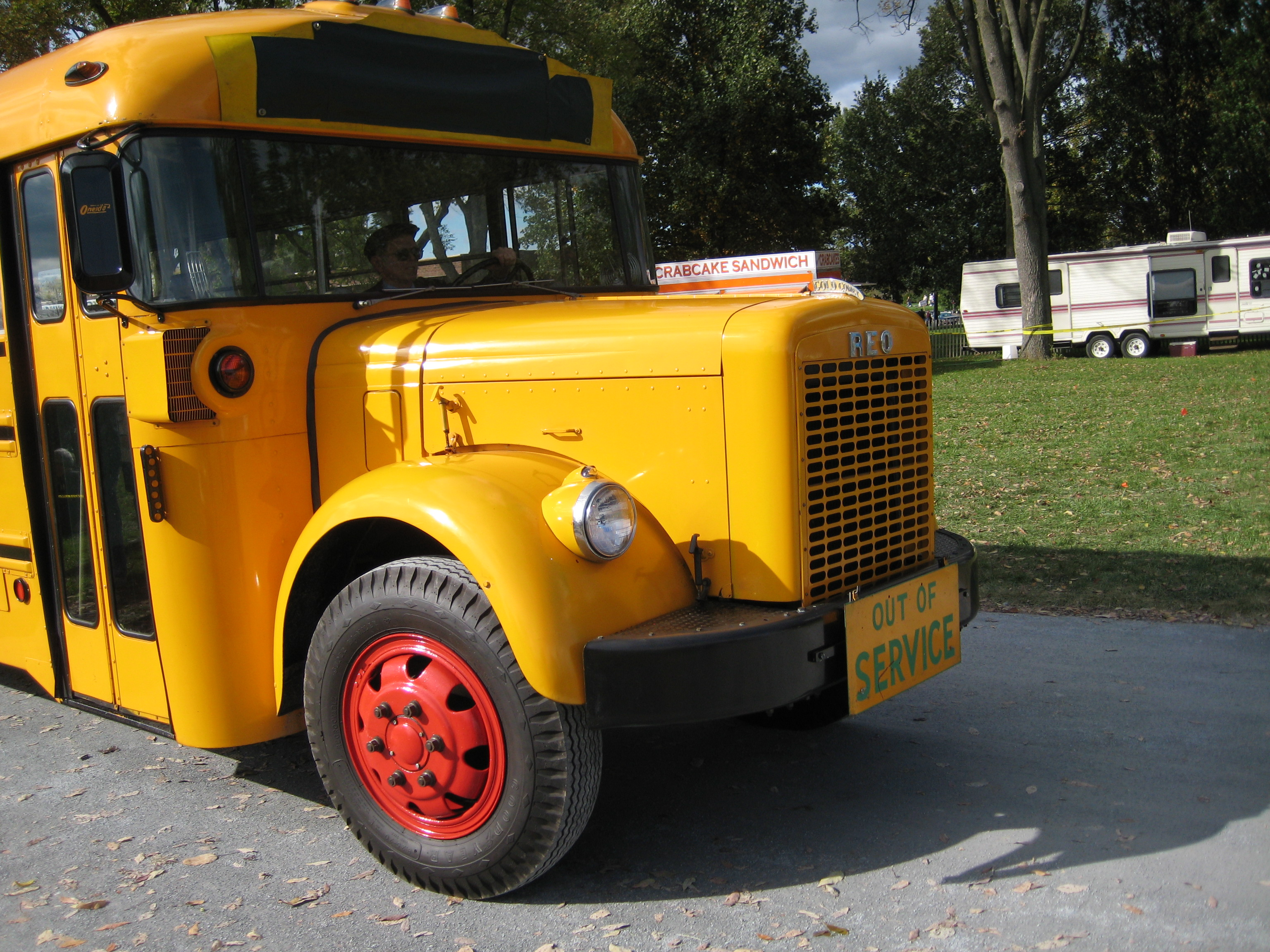
Restored 1950s Reo school bus with an Oneida body

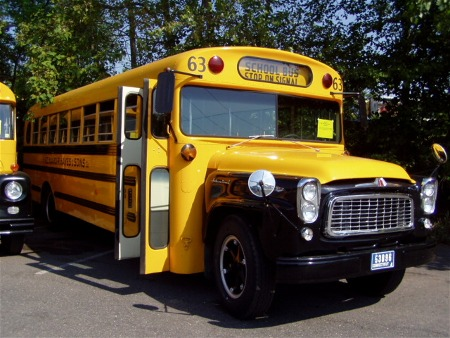
1961 International Harvester B-163 with a Thomas Car Works body

From 1950 to 1982, the baby boomer generation was either in elementary or high school, leading to a significant increase in student populations across North America; this would be a factor that would directly influence school bus production for over three decades.

During the 1950s, as student populations began to grow, larger school buses began to enter production. To increase seating capacity (extra rows of seats), manufacturers began to produce bodies on heavier-duty truck chassis; transit-style school buses also grew in size. In 1954, the first diesel-engined school bus was introduced, with the first tandem-axle school bus in 1955 (a Crown Supercoach, expanding seating to 91 passengers).

To improve accessibility, at the end of the 1950s, manufacturers developed a curbside wheelchair lift option to transport wheelchair-using passengers. In modified form, the design remains in use today.

During the 1950s and 1960s, manufacturers also began to develop designs for small school buses, optimized for urban routes with crowded, narrow streets along with rural routes too isolated for a full-size bus. For this role, manufacturers initially began the use of yellow-painted utility vehicles such as the International Travelall and Chevrolet Suburban. As another alternative, manufacturers began use of passenger vans, such as the Chevrolet Van/GMC Handi-Van, Dodge A100, and Ford Econoline; along with yellow paint, these vehicles were fitted with red warning lights. While more maneuverable, automotive-based school buses did not offer the reinforced passenger compartment of a full-size school bus.

==== Structural integrity ====
During the 1960s, as with standard passenger cars, concerns began to arise for passenger protection in catastrophic traffic collisions. At the time, the weak point of the body structure was the body joints; where panels and pieces were riveted together, joints could break apart in major accidents, with the bus body causing harm to passengers.

After subjecting a bus to a rollover test in 1964, in 1969, Ward Body Works pointing that fasteners had a direct effect on joint quality (and that body manufacturers were using relatively few rivets and fasteners). In its own research, Wayne Corporation discovered that the body joints were the weak points themselves. In 1973, to reduce the risk of body panel separation, Wayne introduced the Wayne Lifeguard, a school bus body with single-piece body side and roof stampings. While single-piece stampings seen in the Lifeguard had their own manufacturing challenges, school buses of today use relatively few side panels to minimize body joints.

=== 1970s ===
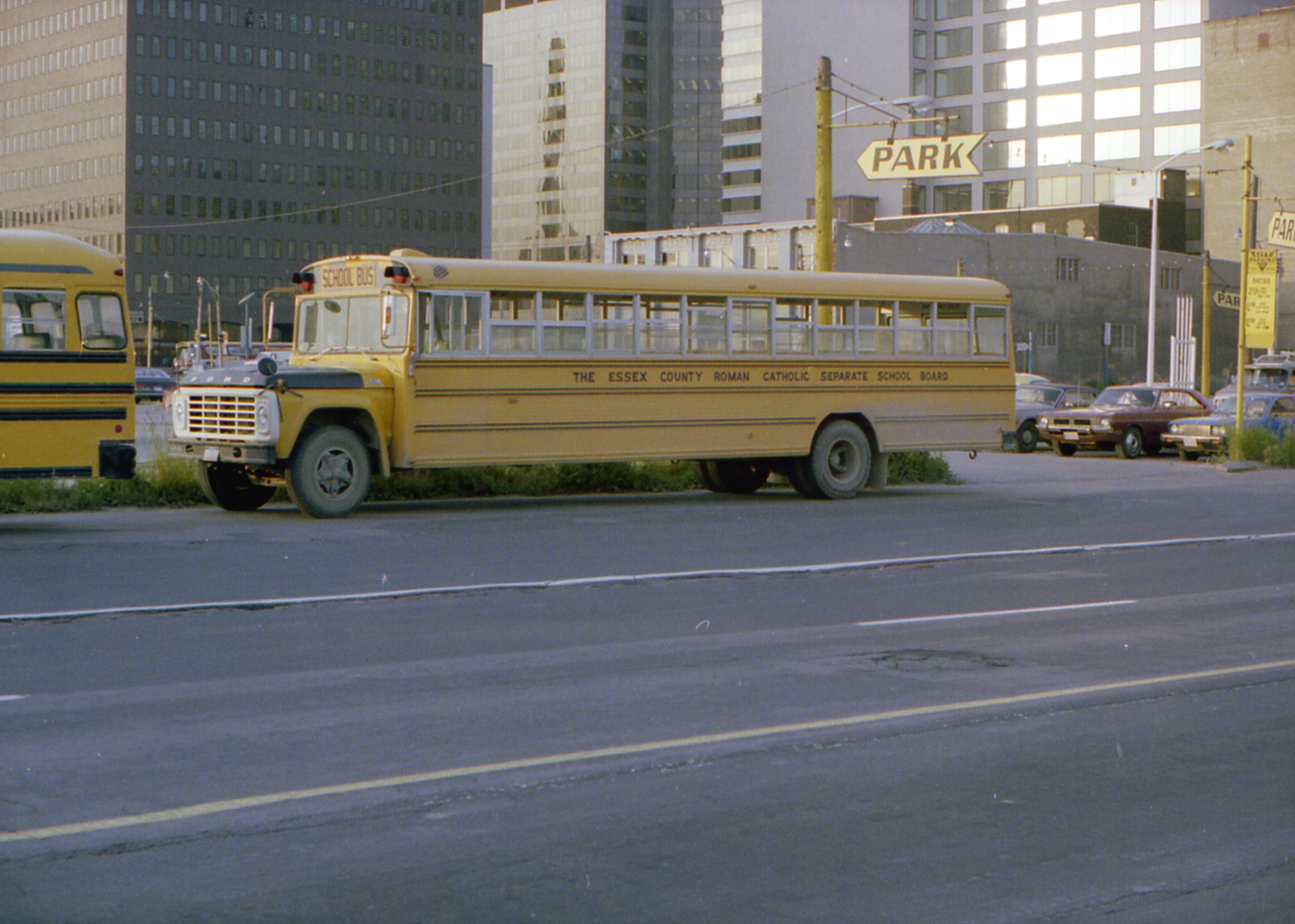
1970s Wayne Lifeguard

During the 1970s, school buses would undergo a number of design upgrades related to safety. While many changes were related to protecting passengers, others were intended to minimize the chances of traffic collisions. To decrease confusion over traffic priority (increasing safety around school bus stops), federal and state regulations were amended, requiring for many states/provinces to add amber warning lamps inboard of the red warning lamps. Similar to a yellow traffic light, the amber lights are activated before stopping (at 100–300 feet (30.5–91.4 m) distance), indicating to drivers that a school bus is about to stop and unload/load students. Adopted by a number of states during the mid-1970s, amber warning lights became nearly universal equipment on new school buses by the end of the 1980s. To supplement the additional warning lights and to help prevent drivers from passing a stopped school bus, a stop arm was added to nearly all school buses; connected to the wiring of the warning lights, the deployable stop arm extended during a bus stop with its own set of red flashing lights.

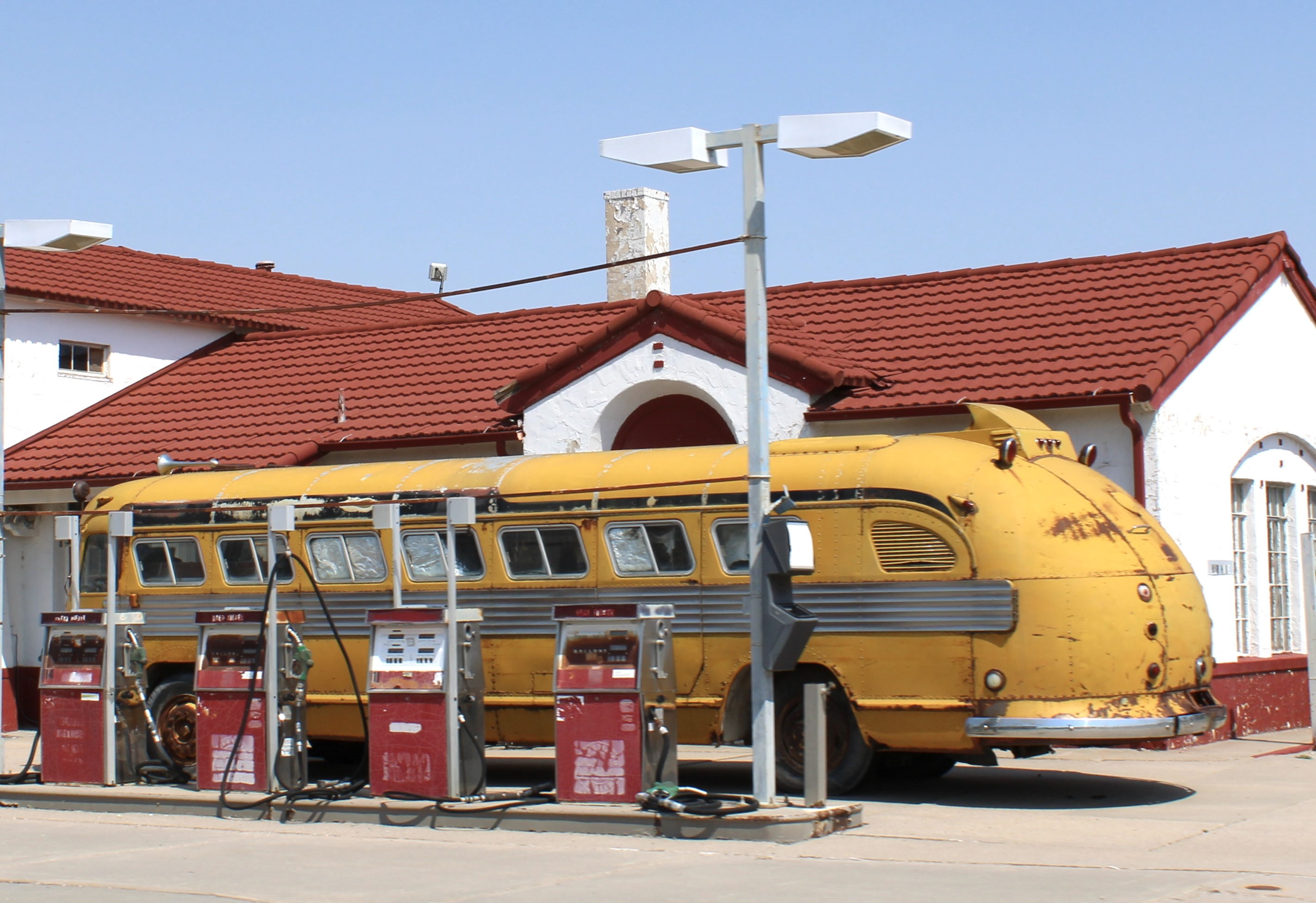
Retired Flxible Clipper school bus in Dighton, KS

In the 1970s, school busing expanded further, under controversial reasons; a number of larger cities began to bus students in an effort to racially integrate schools. Out of necessity, the additional usage created further demand for bus production.

==== Industry safety regulations ====
From 1939 to 1973, school bus production was largely self-regulated. In 1973, the first federal regulations governing school buses went into effect, as FMVSS 217 was required for school buses; the regulation governed specifications of rear emergency exit doors/windows. Following the focus on school bus structural integrity, NHTSA introduced the four Federal Motor Vehicle Safety Standards for School Buses, applied on April 1, 1977, bringing significant change to the design, engineering, and construction of school buses and a substantial improvement in safety performance.

While many changes related to the 1977 safety standards were made under the body structure (to improve crashworthiness), the most visible change was to passenger seating. In place of the metal-back passenger seats seen since the 1930s, the regulations introduced taller seats with thick padding on both the front and back, acting as a protective barrier. Further improvement has resulted from continuing efforts by the U.S. National Highway Traffic Safety Administration (NHTSA) and Transport Canada, as well as by the bus industry and various safety advocates. As of 2020 production, all of these standards remain in effect.

As manufacturers sought to develop safer school buses, small school buses underwent a transition away from automotive-based vehicles. The introduction of cutaway van chassis allowed bus manufacturers to mate a van cab with a purpose-built bus body, using the same construction as a full-size school bus. Within the same length as a passenger van, buses such as the Wayne Busette and Blue Bird Micro Bird offered additional seating capacity, wheelchair lifts, and the same body construction as larger school buses.

1973-1977 NHTSA regulations for school buses
| Standard name | Date effective | Requirement |
|---|---|---|
| Standard No. 217 – Bus Emergency Exits and Window Retention and Release | September 1, 1973 | This established requirements for bus window retention and release to reduce the likelihood of passenger ejection in crashes, and for emergency exits to facilitate passenger exit in emergencies. It also requires that each school bus have an interlock system to prevent the engine starting if an emergency door is locked, and an alarm that sounds if an emergency door is not fully closed while the engine is running. |
| Standard No. 220 – School Bus Rollover Protection | April 1, 1977 | This established performance requirements for school bus rollover protection, to reduce deaths and injuries from failure of a school bus body structure to withstand forces encountered in rollover crashes. |
| Standard No. 221 – School Bus Body Joint Strength | April 1, 1977 | This established requirements for the strength of the body panel joints in school bus bodies, to reduce deaths and injuries resulting from structural collapse of school bus bodies during crashes. |
| Standard No. 222 – School Bus Passenger Seating and Crash Protection | April 1, 1977 | This established occupant protection requirements for school bus passenger seating and restraining barriers, to reduce deaths and injuries from the impact of school bus occupants against structures within the vehicle during crashes and sudden driving maneuvers. |
| Standard No. 301 – Fuel System Integrity – School Buses | April 1, 1977 | This specified requirements for the integrity of motor vehicle fuel systems, to reduce the likelihood of fuel spillage and resultant fires during and after crashes. |

=== 1980s–1990s ===
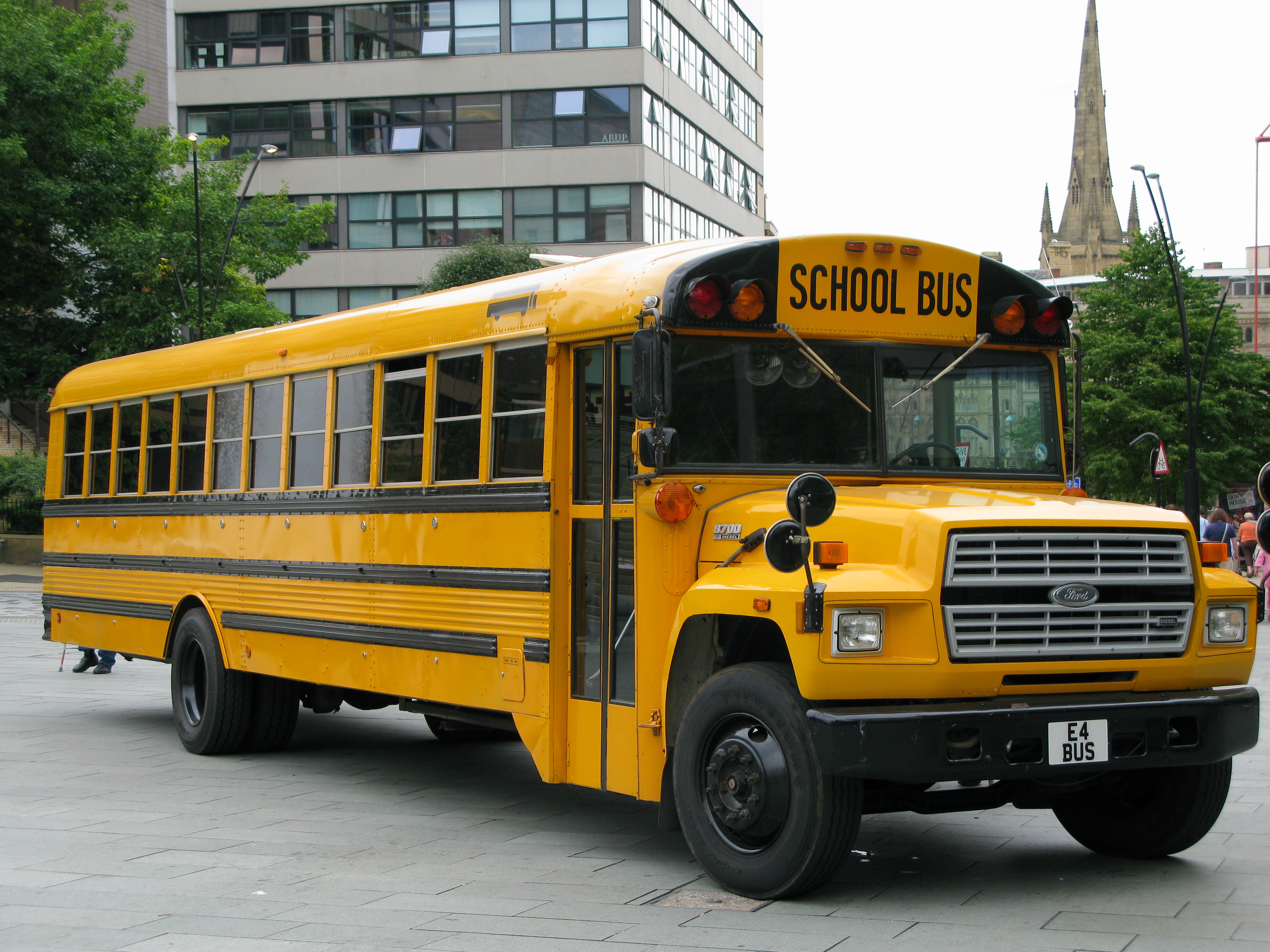
1980s Ford B700 in the United Kingdom

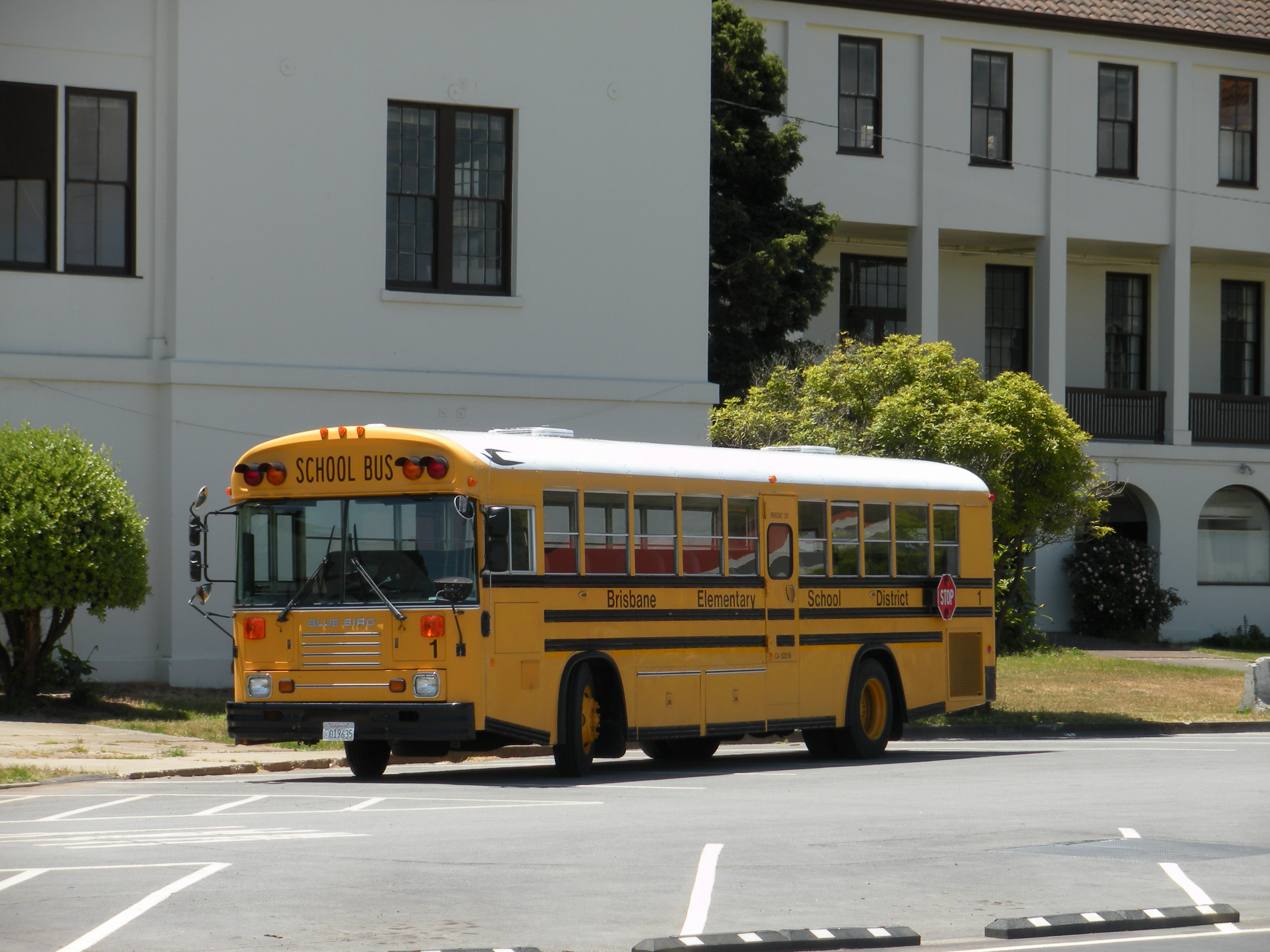
1990s Blue Bird TC/2000 RE in California

For school bus manufacturers, the 1980s marked a period of struggle, following a combination of factors. As the decade began, the end of the baby-boom generation had finished high school; with a decrease in student population growth, school bus manufacturing was left with a degree of overcapacity. Coupled with the recession economy of the early 1980s, the decline in demand for school bus production left several manufacturers in financial ruin. To better secure their future, during the 1990s, school bus manufacturers underwent a period of transition, with several ownership changes leading to joint ventures and alignments between body manufacturers and chassis suppliers.

In 1986, with the signing of the Commercial Motor Vehicle Safety Act, school bus drivers across the United States became required to acquire a commercial driver's license (CDL). While CDLs were issued by individual states, the federal CDL requirement ensured that drivers of all large vehicles (such as school buses) had a consistent training level.

In contrast to the 1970s focus on structural integrity, design advances during the 1980s and 1990s focused around the driver. In 1979 and 1980, International Harvester and Ford each introduced a new-generation bus chassis, with General Motors following suit in 1984. To increase driver visibility, updates in line with chassis redesigns shifted the bus driver upward, outward, and forward. To decrease driver distraction, interior controls were redesigned with improved ergonomics; automatic transmissions came into wider use, preventing the risk of stalling (in hazardous places such as intersections or railroad crossings). Initially introduced during the late 1960s, crossview mirrors came into universal use, improving the view of the blind spots in front of the bus while loading or unloading. To supplement the rear emergency door in an evacuation, manufacturers introduced additional emergency exits during the 1980s, including roof-mounted escape hatches and outward-opening exit windows. Side-mounted exit doors (originally introduced on rear-engine buses), became offered on front-engine and conventional-body buses as a supplemental exit.

Alongside safety, body and chassis manufacturers sought to advance fuel economy of school buses. During the 1980s, diesel engines came into wide use in conventional and small school buses, gradually replacing gasoline-fueled engines. In 1987, International became the first chassis manufacturer to offer diesel engines exclusively, with Ford following suit in 1990.

While conventional-style buses remained the most widely produced full-size school bus, interest in forward visibility, higher seating capacity, and shorter turning radius led to a major expansion of market share of the transit-style configuration, coinciding with several design introductions in the late 1980s. Following the 1986 introduction of the Wayne Lifestar, the AmTran Genesis, Blue Bird TC/2000, and Thomas Saf-T-Liner MVP would prove far more successful.

During the 1990s, small school buses shifted further away from their van-conversion roots. In 1991, Girardin launched the MB-II, combining a single rear-wheel van chassis with a full cutaway bus body. Following the 1992 redesign of the Ford E-Series and the 1997 launch of Chevrolet Express/GMC Savana cutaway chassis, manufacturers followed suit, developing bodies to optimize loading-zone visibility. As manufacturers universally adopted cutaway bodies for single rear-wheel buses, the use of the Dodge Ram Van chassis was phased out. By 2005, the United States government banned the use of 15-passenger vans for student transport, leading to the introduction of Multi-Function School Activity Buses (MFSAB). To better protect passengers, MFSABs share the body structure and compartmentalized seating layout of school buses. Not intended (nor allowed) for uses requiring traffic priority, they are not fitted with school bus warning lights or stop arms (nor are they painted school bus yellow).

In 1995, Blue Bird and Thomas begin to manufacture its conventional school buses in Mexico due to the North American Free Trade Agreement; these facilities were located in Monterrey, Nuevo León. However, the school bus facilities in Mexico were closed between the late 1990s and 2001.

==== Manufacturer transitions ====
In 1980, school buses were manufactured by six body manufacturers (Blue Bird, Carpenter, Superior, Thomas, Ward, and Wayne) and three chassis manufacturers (Ford, General Motors, and International Harvester); in California, two manufacturers (Crown and Gillig) manufactured transit-style school buses using proprietary chassis (sold primarily across the West Coast). From 1980 to 2001, all eight bus manufacturers would undergo periods of struggle and ownership changes. In 1980, Ward filed for bankruptcy, reorganizing as American Transportation Corporation (AmTran) in the same year. That same year, Superior was liquidated by its parent company, closing its doors. Under its company management, Superior was split into two manufacturers, with Mid Bus introducing small buses in 1981 and a reorganized Superior producing full-size buses from 1982 to 1985. At the end of 1989, Carpenter would file for bankruptcy, emerging from it in 1990 as the Carpenter Manufacturing Company. In 1991, Crown Coach would close its doors forever; Gillig produced its last school bus in 1993. Following several ownership changes, Wayne Corporation was liquidated in 1992; successor Wayne Wheeled Vehicles was closed in 1995. In 2001, Carpenter closed its doors.

During the 1990s, as body manufacturers secured their future, family-owned businesses were replaced by subsidiaries as manufacturers underwent mergers, joint ventures, and acquisitions with major chassis suppliers. In 1991, Navistar began its acquisition of AmTran (fully acquiring it in 1995), phasing out the Ward brand name after the 1992 model year. In 1992, Blue Bird would change hands for the first of several times. In 1998, Carpenter was acquired by Spartan Motors and Thomas Built Buses was sold to Freightliner; the latter was the final major school bus manufacturer operating under family control.

Alongside the 1981 introduction of Mid Bus, Corbeil commenced production in Canada and the United States in 1985. Following the second (and final) closure of Superior in 1986, New Bus Company acquired the rights to its body design, producing buses from 1988 to 1989. In 1991, TAM-USA was a joint venture to produce the TAM 252 A 121. Assembled in Yugoslavia (in Slovenia) with final assembly in California, the TAM vehicle was to be the first American-market school bus imported from Europe. The bus model was discontinued in the same year after its introduction, and TAM-USA was closed down in 1994.

In comparison to body manufacturers, chassis suppliers saw a smaller degree of transition. As International Harvester became Navistar International in 1986, the company released updated bus chassis for 1989; in 1996, it produced its first rear-engine bus chassis since 1973. In late 1996, Freightliner produced its first bus chassis, expanding to four manufacturers for the first time since the exit of Dodge in 1977. Ford and General Motors gradually exited out of cowled-chassis production with Ford producing its last chassis after 1998; and General Motors exited the segment after 2003. Both Ford and GM continue production today, concentrating on cutaway-van chassis.

=== 21st century ===
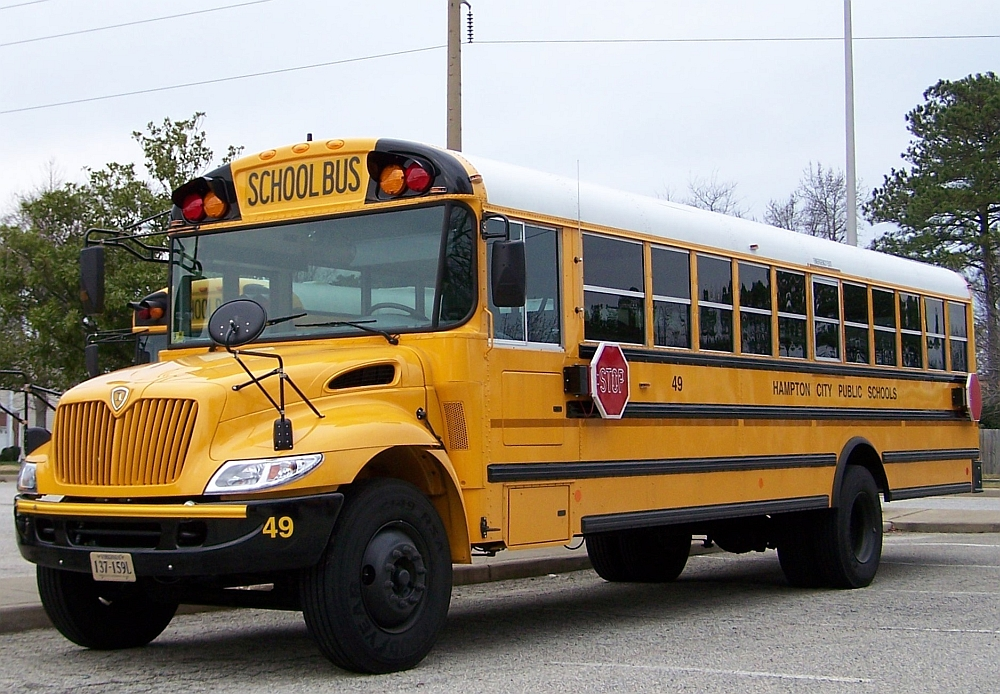
IC Bus CE Series (Bus No. 49 operated by Hampton City Public Schools.)

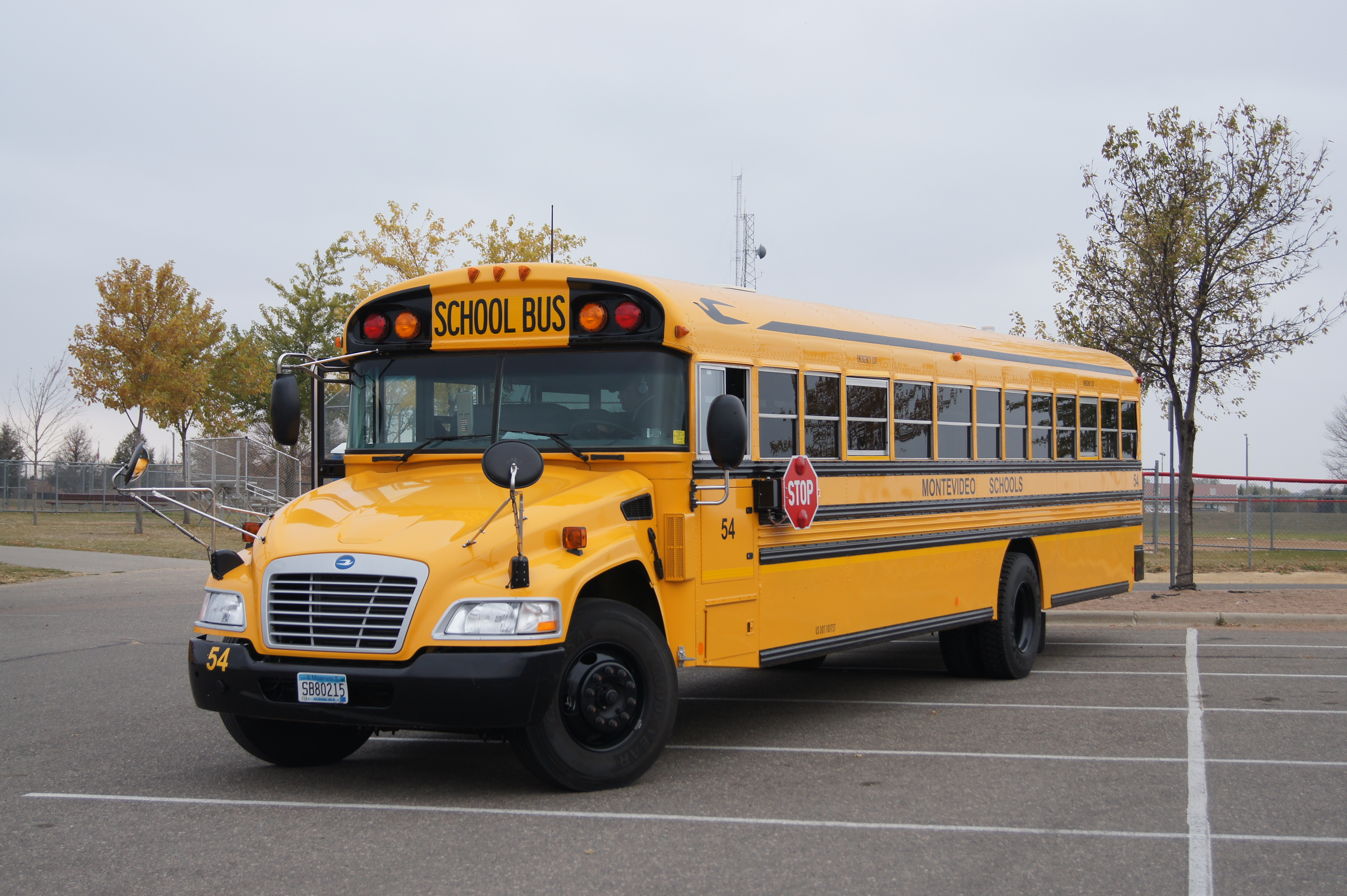
Blue Bird Vision (2nd generation)

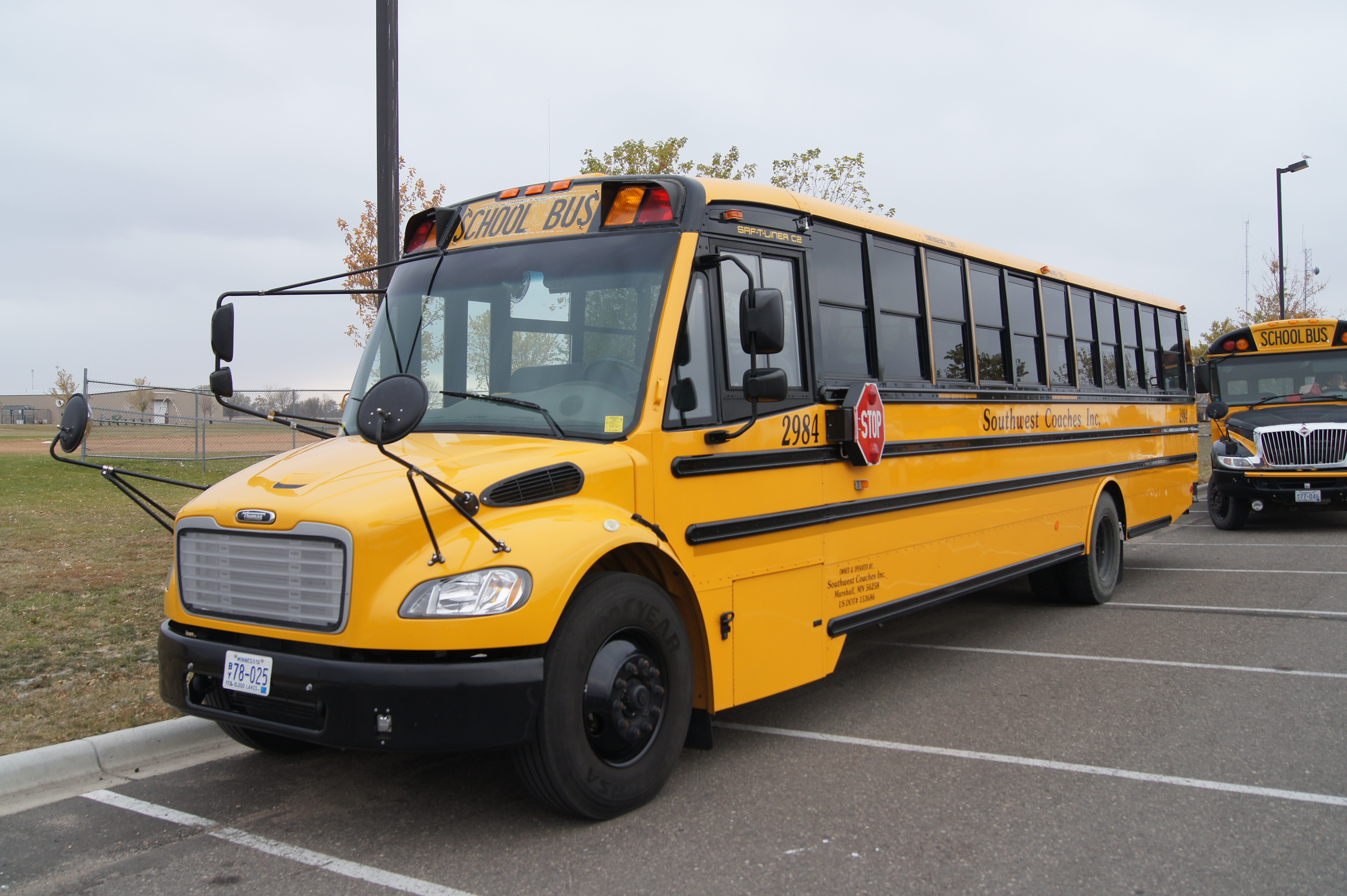
Thomas Saf-T-Liner C2 (Minnesota spec)

The beginning of the twenty-first century introduced extensive changes to the production of school buses. Though vehicle assembly saw few direct changes, manufacturer consolidation and industry contraction effectively ended the practice of customers selecting body and chassis manufacturers independently. While the aspect of customer choice was largely ended (as a result of corporate ownership and supply agreements), decreased complexity paved the way for new product innovations previously thought impossible. In 2000, International introduced the IC, a fully integrated school bus with a 3800 chassis and an AmTran body; the new bus introduced a redesigned drivers compartment and enlarged windshield. During the 2010s, while diesel engines have remained the primary source of power, manufacturers expanded the availability of alternative-fuel vehicles, including CNG, propane, gasoline, and electric-power buses.

At the beginning of the 2000s, manufacturers introduced a new generation of conventional-style school buses, coinciding with the redesign of several medium-duty truck lines. While Ford and General Motors shifted bus production to cutaway chassis, Freightliner and International released new cowled chassis for the 2005 model year. In 2003, Blue Bird introduced the Vision conventional for the 2004 model year; in line with its transit-style buses, the Vision utilized a proprietary chassis (rather than a design from a medium-duty truck). In November 2003, Thomas introduced the Saf-T-Liner C2 (derived from the Freightliner M2), with the body designed alongside its chassis (allowing the use of the production Freightliner dashboard). That same month, IC introduced a redesigned CE Series to fit the International 3300 chassis; to improve visibility, the windshield was redesigned (eliminating the center post).

A trait of the CE, the Vision and the C2 (over their predecessors) is improved loading-zone visibility; both (or all) vehicles adopted highly sloped hoods and extra glass around the entry door. Between 2004 and 2008, Advanced Energy, an NC based non-profit created by the NC Utilities Commission begun an effort to move to plug-in hybrid school buses. A business and technical feasibility proved the benefits, and in 2006, 20 districts awarded a contract facilitated by Advanced Energy to IC Bus to produce the buses. Although the buses produced significant benefits, the buses were slowly discontinued when the hybrid system manufacture Enova faded into financial challenges.

In 2011, Lion Bus (renamed Lion Electric Company) of Saint-Jérôme, Quebec was founded, marking the first entry into the segment in over 20 years by a full-size bus manufacturer. Using a chassis supplied by Spartan Motors, Lion produces conventional-style school buses, its design features several firsts for school bus production. Along with a 102-inch body width, to resist corrosion, Lion uses composite body panels in place of steel. In 2015, Lion introduced the eLion, the first mass-produced school bus with a fully electric powertrain.

Small school buses have undergone few fundamental changes to their designs during the 2000s, though the Type B configuration has largely been retired from production. Following the 1998 sale of the General Motors P-chassis to Navistar subsidiary Workhorse, the design began to be phased out in favor of higher-capacity Type A buses. In 2006, IC introduced the BE200 as its first small school bus; a fully cowled Type B, the BE200 shared much of its body with the CE (on a lower-profile chassis). In 2010, IC introduced the AE-series, a cutaway-cab school bus (derived from the International TerraStar). In 2015, the Ford Transit cutaway chassis was introduced (alongside the long-running E350/450); initially sold with a Micro Bird body, the Transit has been offered through several manufacturers. In 2018, the first bus derived from the Ram ProMaster cutaway chassis was introduced; Collins Bus introduced the Collins Low Floor, the first low-floor school bus (of any configuration).

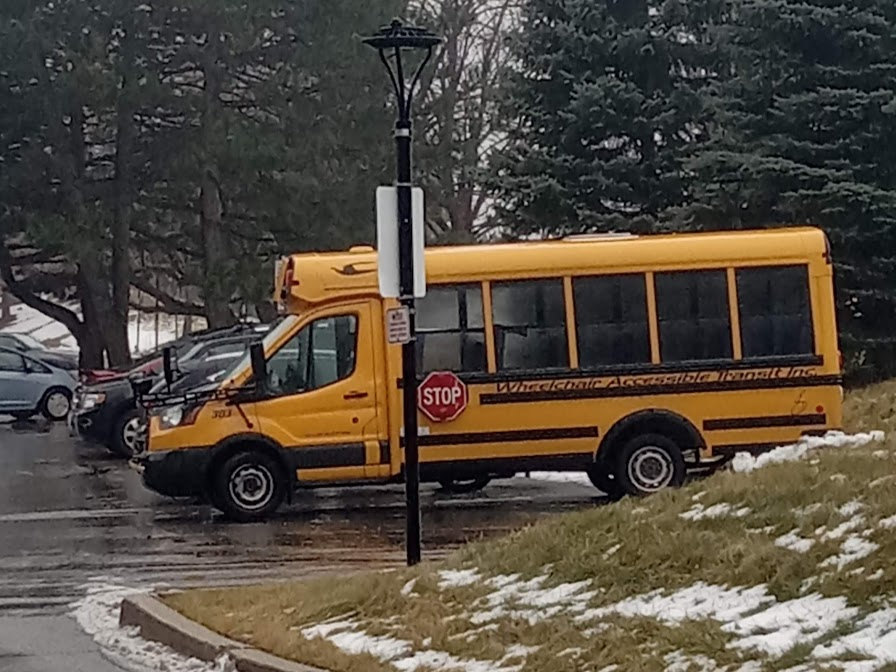
Van chassis-based school buses are much more ubiquitous in Canada, particularly in urban centres, where regular public transportation often moves students to class. (Blue Bird Micro Bird T-Series)

==== Manufacturing segment stability ====
Following the 2001 closure of Carpenter, the manufacturing segment has seen a much lower degree of contraction (with the exception of the 2005 failure of startup manufacturer Liberty Bus). Following the bankruptcy of Corbeil, the company was acquired at the end of 2007 by Collins, reorganizing it as a subsidiary (alongside Mid Bus) and shifting production to its Kansas facilities. The same year, U.S. Bus was reorganized as Trans Tech. In 2008, Starcraft Bus entered the segment, producing school buses on cutaway chassis (a 2011 prototype using a Hino chassis was never produced). In 2009, Blue Bird and Girardin entered into a joint venture, named Micro Bird; Girardin develops and produces the Blue Bird small-bus product line in Canada. The 2011 founding of Lion Bus marked the return of bus production to Canada (with the first Canadian-brand full-size buses sold in the United States). During the 2010s, Collins retired the Mid Bus and Corbeil brands (in 2013 and 2016, respectively).

==== Safety innovations ====
During the 2000s, school bus safety adopted a number of evolutionary advances. To further improve visibility for other drivers, manufacturers began to replace incandescent lights with LEDs for running lights, turn signals, brake lights, and warning lamps. School bus crossing arms, first introduced in the late 1990s, came into wider use. Electronics took on a new role in school bus operation. To increase child safety and security, alarm systems were developed to prevent children from being left on unattended school buses overnight. To track drivers who illegally pass school buses loading and unloading students, in the 2010s, some school buses began to adopt exterior cameras synchronized with the deployment of the exterior stop arms. Onboard GPS tracking devices have taken on a dual role of fleet management and location tracking, allowing for internal management of costs and also to alert waiting parents and students of the real-time location of their bus. Seatbelts in school buses underwent a redesign, with lap-type seatbelts phased out in favor of 3-point seatbelts.

== Design overview ==
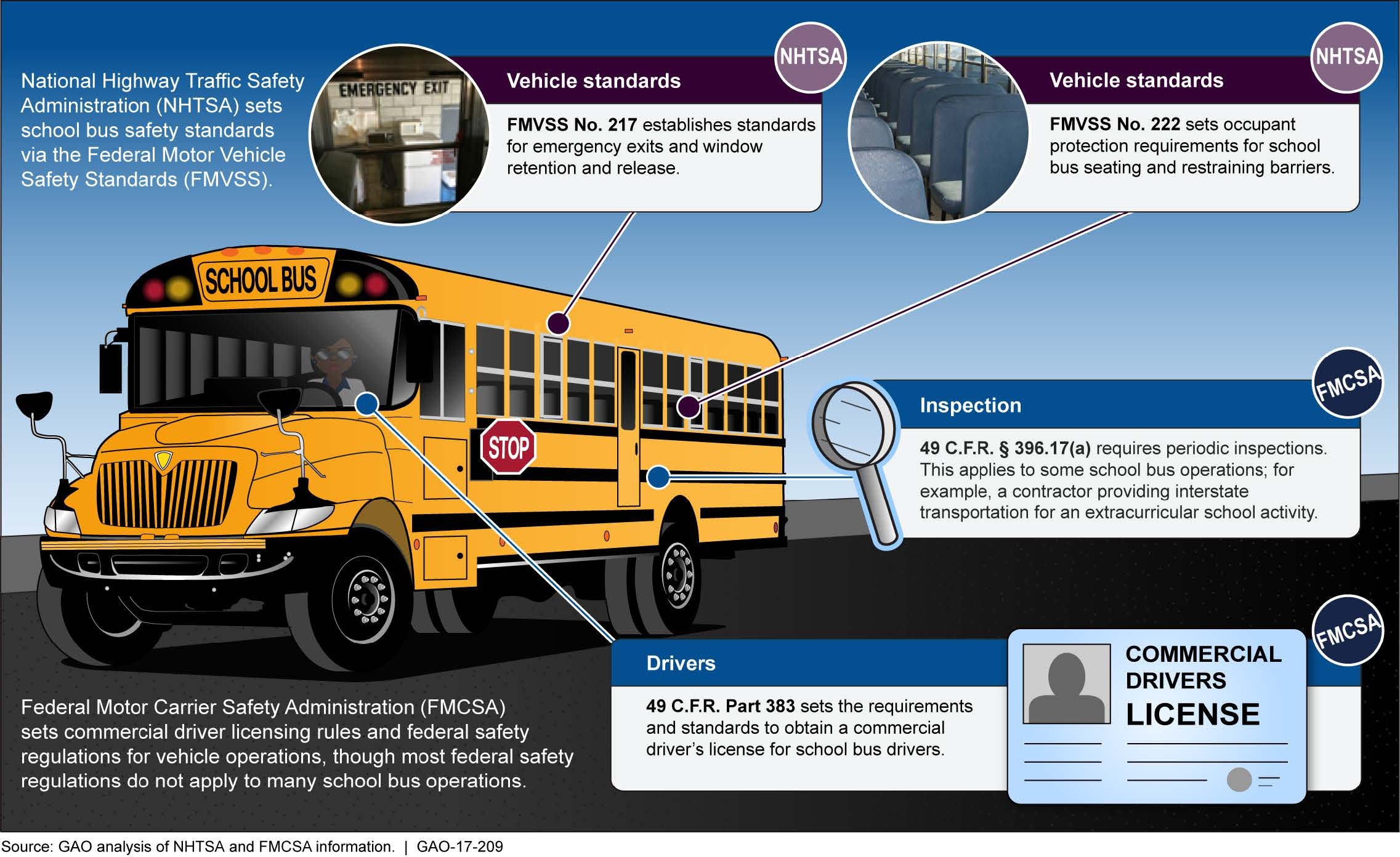
Current oversight over design and operation of school buses

On average, five fatalities involve school-age children on a school bus each year; statistically, a school bus is over 70 times safer than riding to school by car. Many fatalities related to school buses are passengers of other vehicles and pedestrians (only 5% are bus occupants). Since the initial development of consistent school bus standards in 1939, many of the ensuing changes to school buses over the past eight decades have been safety related, particularly in response to more stringent regulations adopted by state and federal governments.

Ever since the adoption of yellow as a standard color in 1939, school buses deliberately integrate the concept of conspicuity into their design. When making student dropoffs or pickups, traffic law gives school buses priority over other vehicles; in order to stop traffic, they are equipped with flashing lights and a stop sign.

As a consequence of their size, school buses have a number of blind spots around the outside of the vehicle which can endanger passengers disembarking a bus or pedestrians standing or walking nearby. To address this safety challenge, a key point of school bus design is focused on exterior visibility, improving the design of bus windows, mirrors, and the windshield to optimize visibility for the driver. In the case of a collision, the body structure of a school bus is designed with an integral roll cage; as a school bus carries a large number of student passengers, a school bus is designed with several emergency exits to facilitate fast egress.

In the United States and Canada, numerous federal and state regulations require school buses to be manufactured as a purpose-built vehicle distinct from other buses. In contrast to buses in use for public transit, dedicated school buses used for student transport are all single-deck, two-axle design (multi-axle designs are no longer in use). Outside of North America, buses utilized for student transport are derived from vehicles used elsewhere in transit systems, including coaches, minibuses, and transit buses.

=== Types ===
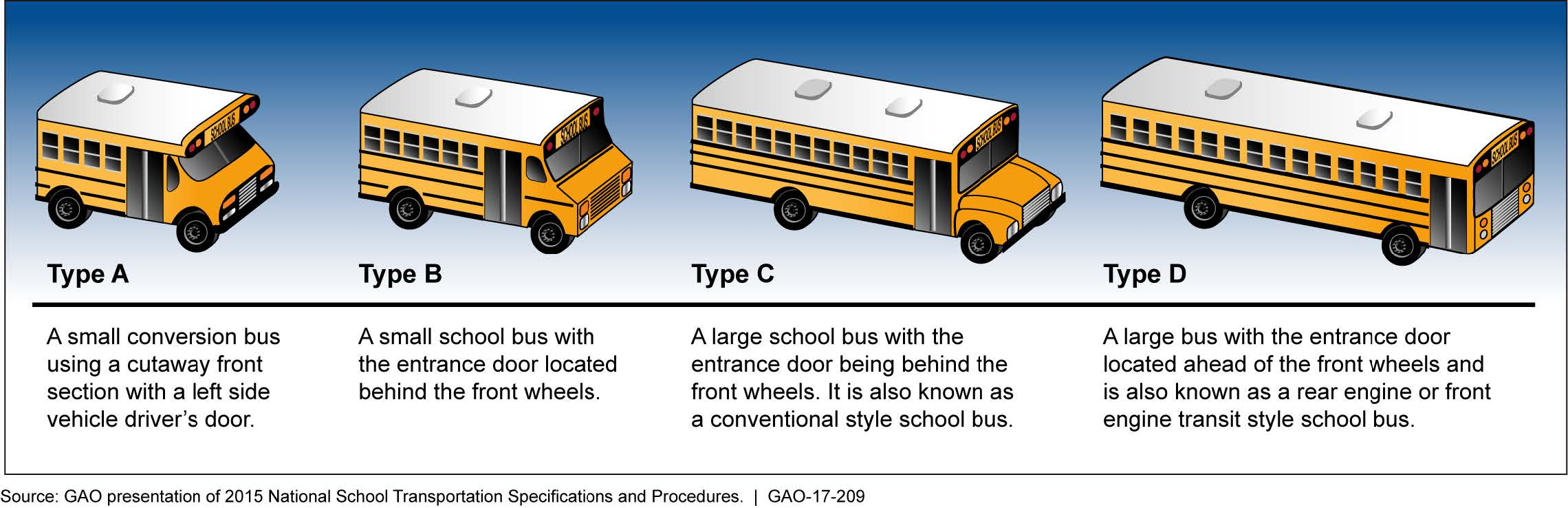
School bus types

There are four types of school buses produced by manufacturers in North America. The smallest school buses (bodied on a cutaway van chassis) are designated Type A; a larger format (bodied on bare front-engine chassis) are designated Type B buses. Type A and Type B school buses are known as short buses, and they are used to transport students in special education separately from other students. Large school buses include Type C (bodied on cowled medium-duty truck chassis) and Type D (monocoque or semi-monocoque transit-style buses with a front or rear engine). Type C buses are the most common design, while Type D buses are the largest vehicles.

All school buses are of single deck design with step entry. In the United States and Canada, bus bodies are restricted to a maximum width of 102 in (2.59 m) and a maximum length of 45 ft (13.7 m). Seating capacity is affected by both body length and operator specifications, with the largest designs seating up to 90 passengers.

==== Other formats ====
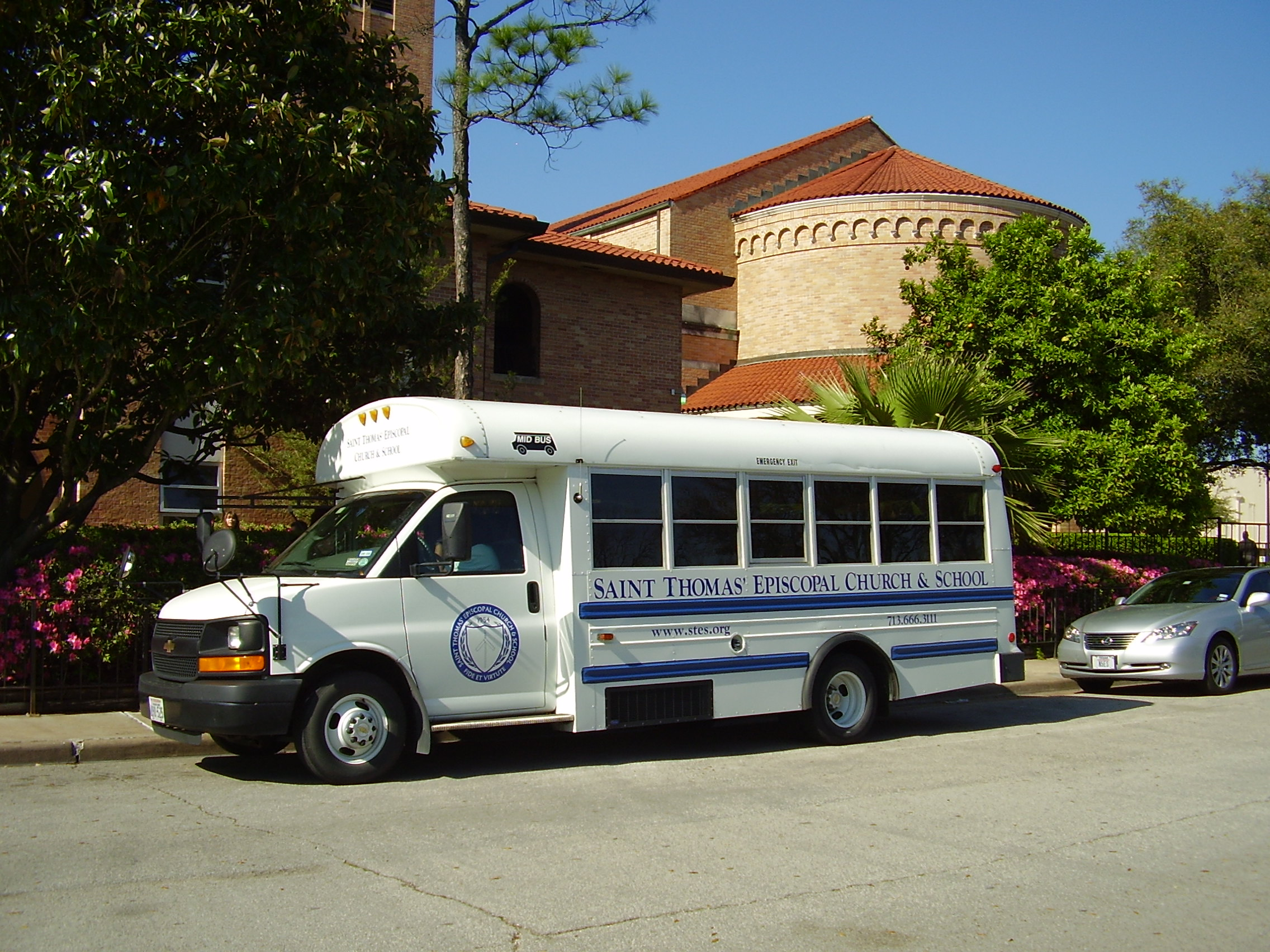
Multi-Function School Activity Bus (MFSAB) in Houston, Texas

In both public and private education systems, other types of school buses are used for purposes of student transport outside of regular route service. Along with their usage, these buses are distinguished from regular yellow school buses by their exterior design.

An "activity bus" is a school bus used for providing transportation for students. In place of home to school route service, an activity bus is primarily used for the purpose for transportation related to extracurricular activities. Depending on individual state/provincial regulations, the bus used for this purpose can either be a regular yellow school bus or a dedicated unit for this purpose. Dedicated activity buses, while not painted yellow, are fitted with the similar interiors as well as the same traffic control devices for dropping off students (at other schools); conversely, it cannot be used in regular route service.

A Multi-Function School Activity Bus (MFSAB) is a bus intended for use in both the private sector and the educational system. While sharing a body structure with a school bus, an MFSAB is not designed for use in route service, as it is not fitted with traffic control devices (i.e., red warning lights, stop arm) nor is it painted school bus yellow. Within the educational system, the design is primarily used for extracurricular activities requiring bus transportation; in the private sector, the MFSAB is intended as a replacement for 15-passenger vans (no longer legal for child transport in either the public or private sector). Many examples are derived from Type A buses (with derivatives of full-size school buses also offered).

=== Features ===
==== Livery ====
To specifically identify them as such, purpose-built school buses are painted a specific shade of yellow, designed to optimize their visibility for other drivers. In addition to "School Bus" signage in the front and rear above the window line, school buses are labeled with the name of the operator (school district or bus contractor) and an identification number.

===== Yellow color =====
Yellow was adopted as the standard color for North American school buses in 1939. In April of that year, rural education specialist Frank W. Cyr organized a national conference at Columbia University to establish production standards for school buses, including a standard exterior color. The color which became known as "school bus yellow" was selected because black lettering on that specific hue was easiest to see in the semi-darkness of early morning and late afternoon. Officially, school bus yellow was designated "National School Bus Chrome"; following the removal of lead from the pigment, it was renamed "National School Bus Glossy Yellow".

Outside the United States and Canada, the association of yellow with school buses has led to its use on school-use buses around the world (although not necessarily required by government specification). Some areas establishing school transport services have conducted evaluations of American yellow-style school buses; to better suit local climate conditions, other governments have established their own color requirements, favoring other high-visibility colors (such as white or orange).

===== Retroreflective markings =====
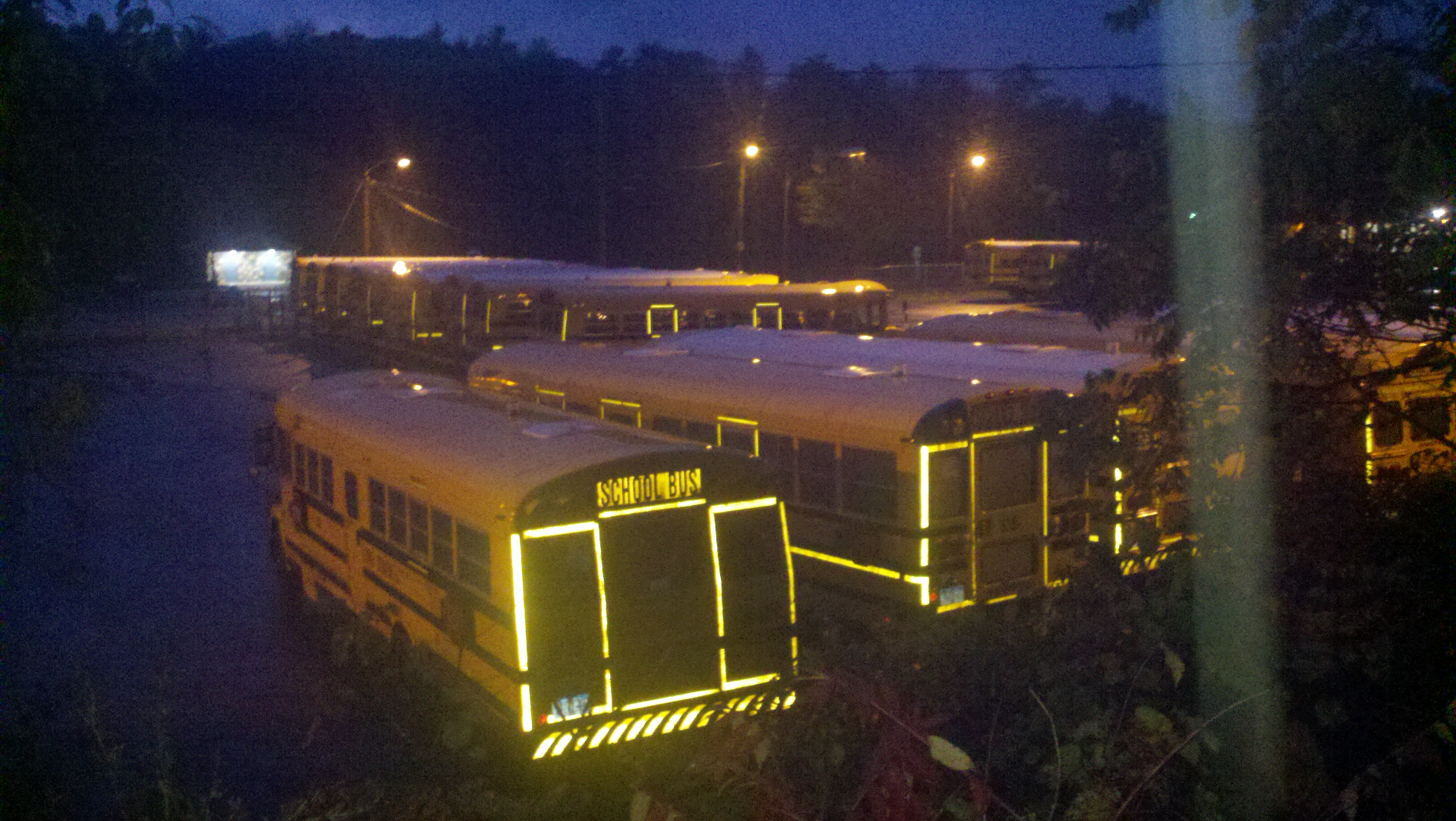
Reflective tape on school buses (brightened by camera flash)

While its yellow exterior makes it more conspicuous than other vehicles, a school bus can remain hard to see in some low-visibility conditions, including sunrise or sunset, poor weather (all seasons), and in rural areas. To further improve their visibility (to other vehicles), many state and provincial governments (for example, Colorado) require the use of yellow reflective tape on school buses. Marking the length, width, height, and in some cases, identifying the bus as a school bus, reflective tape makes the vehicle easier to see in low light, also marking all emergency exits (so rescue personnel can quickly find them in darkness). Other requirements include reflective "School Bus" lettering (or the use of a front-lighted sign).

The equivalent requirement in Canada is almost identical; the only difference is that red cannot be used as a retroreflective color.

==== Safety devices ====
To comply with federal and state requirements, school buses are equipped with a number of safety devices to prevent accidents and injuries and for the purposes of security.

===== Mirror systems =====
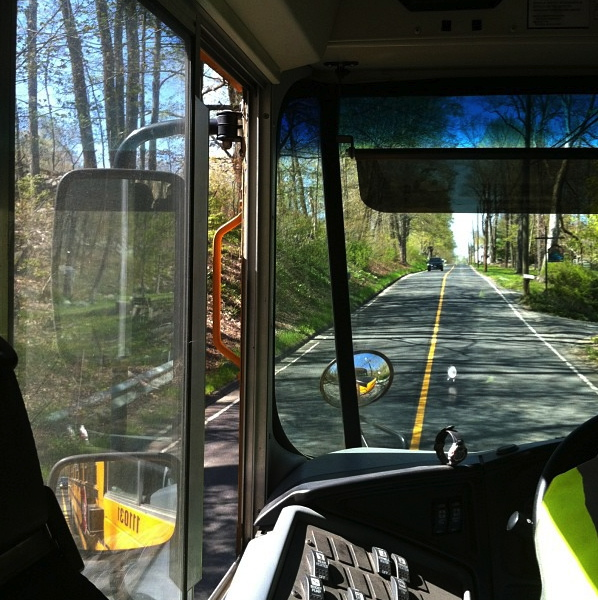
View behind school bus driver's compartment, showing multiple mirrors (rearview, convex, and crossview) and sun visor

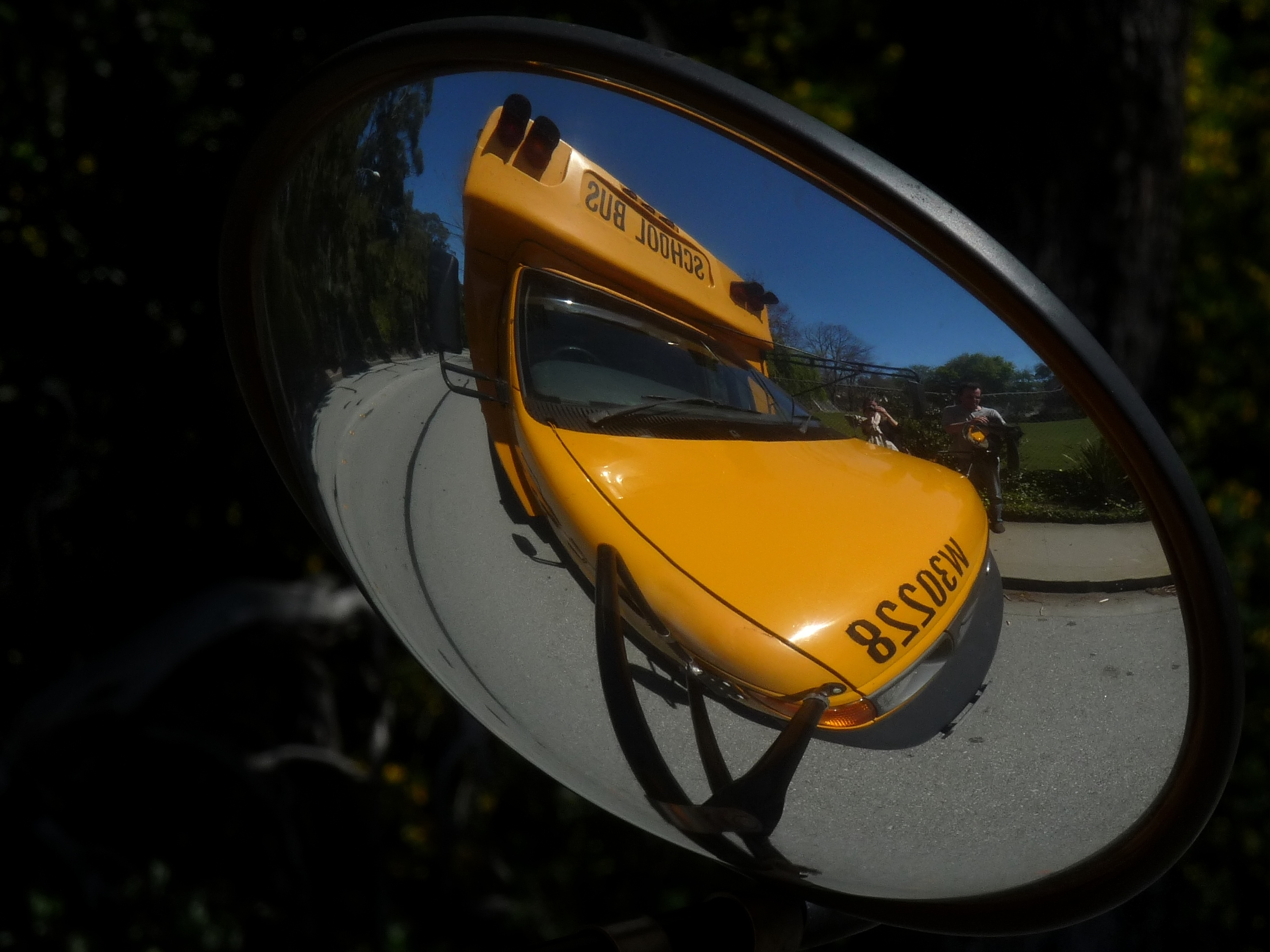
Vision field of a school bus crossview mirror, which allows bus driver to observe blind spots close to vehicle.

When driving and when loading/unloading students, a key priority for a school bus driver is maintaining proper sightlines around their vehicle; the blind spots formed by the school bus can be a significant risk to bus drivers and traffic as well as pedestrians.

In the United States, approximately 2/3 of students killed outside of the school bus are not struck by other vehicles, but by their own bus. To combat this problem, school buses are specified with sophisticated and comprehensive mirror systems. In redesigns of school bus bodies, driver visibility and overall sightlines have become important considerations. In comparison to school buses from the 1980s, school buses from the 2000s have much larger windscreens and fewer and/or smaller blind spots.

===== Emergency exits =====
For the purposes of evacuation, school buses are equipped with a minimum of at least one emergency exit (in addition to the main entry door). The rear-mounted emergency exit door is a design feature adopted from horse-drawn wagons (the entrance was rear-mounted to avoid disturbing the horses); in rear-engine school buses, the door is replaced by an exit window mounted above the engine compartment (supplemented by a side-mounted exit door). Additional exits may be located in the roof (roof hatches), window exits, and/or side emergency exit doors. All are opened by the use of quick-release latches which activate an alarm.

The number of emergency exits in a school bus is dependent on its seating capacity and also varies by individual state/provincial requirements. The most currently installed is eight on school buses in Kentucky. Buses that are owned or used by Kentucky school districts require, in addition to the main entry door, a rear exit door (or window, for rear-engine buses), a left-side exit door, four exit windows (two on each side), and two roof-mounted exit hatches. The current Kentucky standards were enacted after 27 people died in the Carrolton bus collision on May 14, 1988, in which a former school bus that was converted into a church bus was hit head on by a drunk driver.

===== Video surveillance =====
Since the 1990s, video cameras have become common equipment installed inside school buses. As recording technology has transitioned from VHS to digital cameras, school buses have adopted multiple-camera systems, providing surveillance from multiple vantage points.

While primarily used to monitor and record passenger behavior, video cameras have also been used in the investigation of accidents involving school buses. On March 28, 2000, a Murray County, Georgia, school bus was hit by a CSX freight train at an unsignaled railroad crossing; three children were killed. The bus driver claimed to have stopped and looked for approaching trains before proceeding across the tracks, as is required by law, but the onboard camera recorded that the bus had in fact not stopped and had the AM/FM radio playing.

In the 2010s, exterior-mounted cameras synchronized with the stop arms have come into use. The cameras photograph vehicles that illegally pass the bus when its stop arm and warning lights are in use (a moving violation).

==== Restraint systems ====
In contrast to cars and other light-duty passenger vehicles, school buses are not typically equipped with active restraint systems, such as seat belts; whether seat belts should be a requirement has been a topic of controversy. Since the 1970s, school buses have used the concept of compartmentalization as a passive restraint system. During the late 2000s and 2010s, seatbelt design transitioned, with 3-point restraints replacing lap belts.

As of 2015, seatbelts are a requirement in at least five states: California, Florida, New Jersey, New York, and Texas; Canada does not require their installation (at the provincial level). Of the states that equip buses with two-point lap seat belts (Florida, Louisiana, New Jersey and New York), only New Jersey requires seat belt usage by riders. In other states, it is up to the district or operator whether to require passengers to use them or not.

===== Passive restraints (compartmentalization) =====
According to the National Highway Transportation Association (NHTSA), studies completed previously on school buses showed that due to their size and heaviness, school buses did not require that safety belts be in place. Information gathered in previous studies showed that a size of a bus, combined with the design of the seat and the material in the space between the seats themselves, showed that there was no need for safety belts on a school bus. A school bus is larger and heavier than a normal size passenger bus and could distribute the force of the crash evenly. Combined with the space between the seats as well as the design prevented serious injuries from happening. This attribute, does not carry over to a small bus due to its lesser size; buses with a GVWR under 10,000 pounds are required to have safety belts.

However, recent accidents involving school buses that have caused serious (if not fatal) injuries have caused the National Transportation Safety Board to conduct new tests to check the legitimacy of this continued practice. After completing these tests due to bus accidents in 2016, they have recommended that new buses being built need to have both a lap and shoulder harness in place. They have also recommended that 42 states add seat belts as a requirement. There are some states that have already added the lap belt. This study made the NTSB recommend adding shoulder harnesses to those states that already have a lap belt in place.

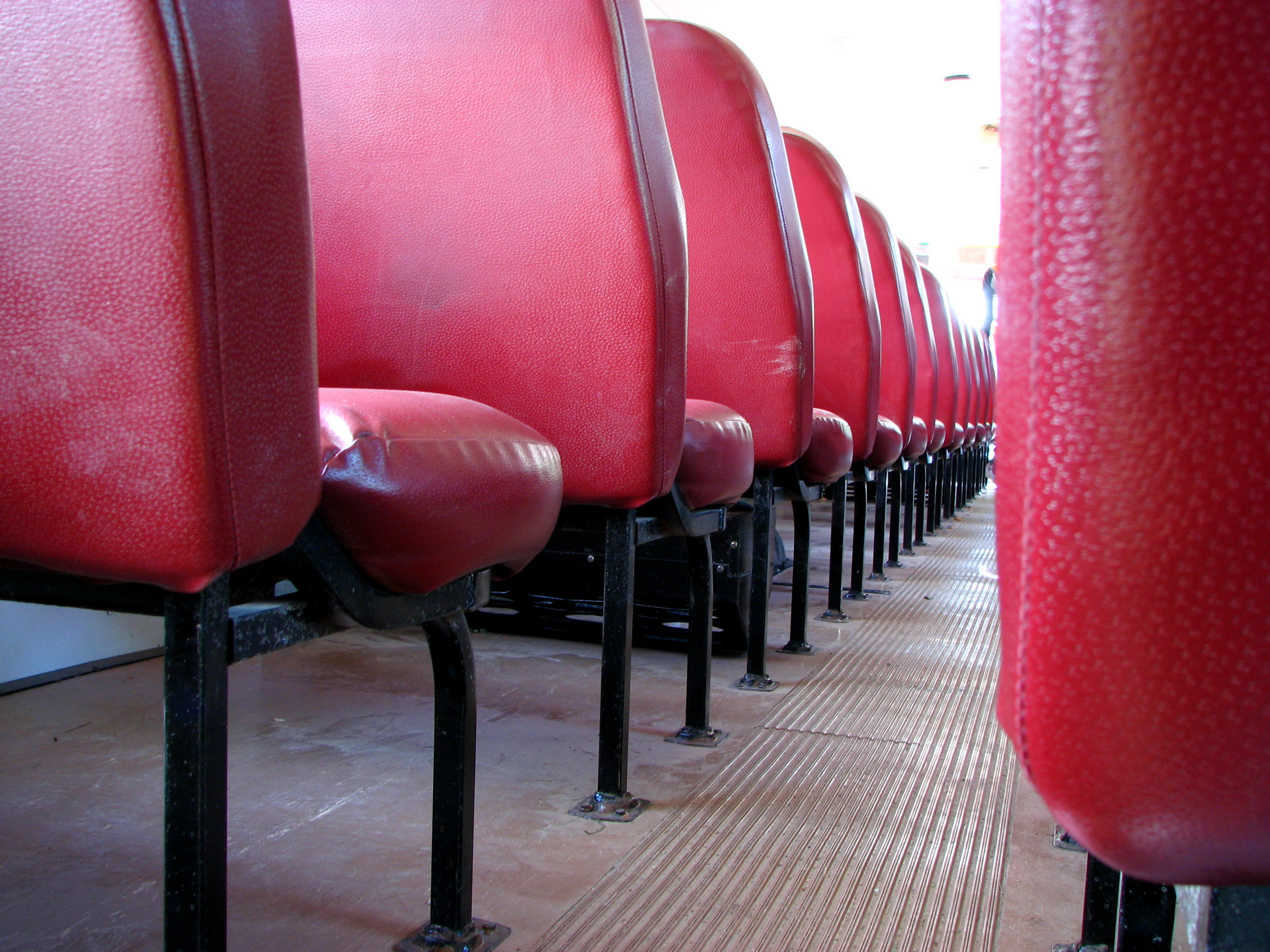
School bus seats (rear view). Part of the premise behind compartmentalization is close spacing of each set of seats.

In 1967 and 1972, as part of an effort to improve crash protection in school buses, UCLA researchers played a role in the future of school bus interior design. Using the metal-backed seats then in use as a means of comparison, several new seat designs were researched in crash testing. In its conclusion, the UCLA researchers found that the safest design was a 28-inch high padded seatback spaced a maximum of 24 inches apart, using the concept of compartmentalization as a passive restraint. While the UCLA researchers found the compartmentalized seats to be the safest design, they found active restraints (such as seatbelts) to be next in terms of importance of passenger safety. In 1977, FMVSS 222 mandated a change to compartmentalized seats, though the height requirement was lowered to 24 inches. According to the NTSB, the main disadvantage of passive-restraint seats is its lack of protection in side-impact collisions (with larger vehicles) and rollover situations. Though by design, students are protected front to back by compartmentalization, it allows the potential for ejection in other crash situations (however rare).

===== Active restraints (seatbelts) =====
Federal Motor Vehicle Safety Standard (FMVSS) 222 was introduced in 1977, requiring passive restraints and more stringent structural integrity standards; as part of the legislation, seatbelts were exempted from school buses with a gross vehicle weight (GVWR) exceeding 10,000 pounds.

In 1987, New York became the first state to require seatbelts on full-size school buses (raising the seat height to 28 inches); the requirement did not mandate their use. In 1992, New Jersey followed suit, becoming the first state to require their use, remaining the only state to do so. Outside of North America, Great Britain mandated seatbelts in 1995 for minibuses used in student transportation. In 2004, California became the first state to require 3-point seatbelts (on small buses; large buses, 2005), with Texas becoming the second in 2010.

In 2011, FMVSS 222 was revised to improve occupant protection in small (Type A) school buses. Along with requiring 3-point restraints (in place of lap belts), the revision created design standards for their use in full-size school buses. While previously reducing seating capacity by up to one-third, NHTSA recognized new technology that allows using seatbelts for either three small (elementary-age) children or two larger children (high-school age) per seat. In October 2013, the National Association of State Directors of Pupil Transportation Services (NASDPTS) most recently stated at their annual transportation conference (NAPT) that they now fully support three-point lap-shoulder seat belts on school buses.

CBC Television's The Fifth Estate has been critical of a 1984 Transport Canada study, a crash test of a school bus colliding head-on that suggested that seat belts (at the time, which were two-point lap belts) would interfere with the compartmentalization passive safety system. This had become "the most widely cited study" in North America, according to U.S. regulators, and was frequently quoted for decades by school boards and bus manufacturers across the continent as a reason not to install seat belts. Transport Canada has stuck to its stance against installing seat belts on school buses, despite numerous newer studies and actual accidents showing that compartmentalization could not protect against side impacts, rollovers, and being rear-ended; which would have been avoided by implementing three-point seat belts that would have kept occupants from being thrown from their seats.

== Manufacturing ==
In 2018, 44,381 school buses were sold in North America (compared to 31,194 in 2010). Approximately 70% of production is of Type C configuration.

=== Production (North America) ===
In the United States and Canada, school buses are currently produced by ten different manufacturers. Four of them – Collins Industries, Endera Motors, Trans Tech, and Van-Con – specialize exclusively in small buses. Thomas Built Buses, GreenPower Motor Company, RIDE, and Blue Bird Corporation (the latter, through its Micro Bird joint venture with Girardin)—produce both small and large buses. IC Bus and LION produce full-size buses exclusively.

During the 20th century, Canada was home to satellite facilities of several U.S. firms (Blue Bird, Thomas, Wayne), exporting production across North America, with other production imported from the United States. Domestically, Corbeil manufactured full-size and small school buses (1985–2007) and Girardin produced small buses. In 2011, Lion Bus (today, LION) was founded as a Quebec-based manufacturer of full-size buses, shifting development to fully-electric vehicles.

== Operations ==
Every year in the United States and Canada, school buses provide an estimated 8 billion student trips from home and school. Each school day in 2015, nearly 484,000 school buses transported 26.9 million children to and from school and school-related activities; over half of the United States K–12 student population is transported by school bus. Outside North America, purpose-built vehicles for student transport are less common. Depending on location, students ride to school on transit buses (on school-only routes), coaches, or a variety of other buses.

While school bus operations vary widely by location, in the United States and Canada, school bus services operate independent of public transport, with their own bus stops and schedules, coordinated with school class times.

School bus routing is also studied as an operations research problem, encompassing bus-stop selection, route generation, bus scheduling, and school bell-time adjustment. Common constraints include vehicle capacity, maximum student ride time, and school time windows.

In practical implementations, route generation may also incorporate operational data such as student locations, vehicle capacities, pickup constraints, and student-specific transportation requirements.

=== Licensing ===
School bus drivers in the United States are required to hold a commercial driver's license (CDL). Full-size school buses are generally considered Class B vehicles; most van-based school buses are considered Class C vehicles. In addition to a standard P (passenger) endorsement, school bus drivers must acquire a separate S (school bus) endorsement; along with a written and driving test, the endorsement requires a background check and sex offender registry check.

=== Loading and unloading ===
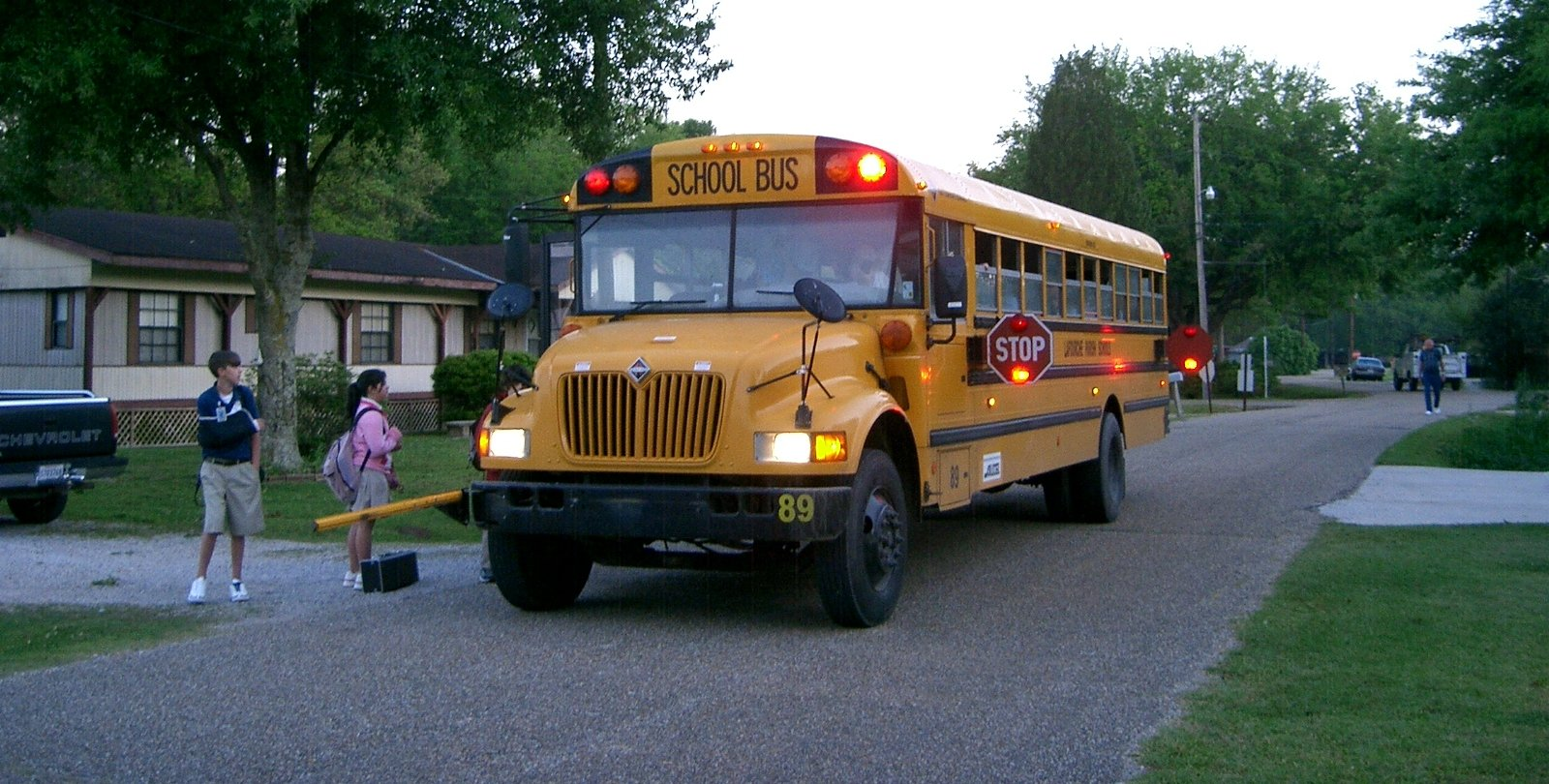
2002 International IC at bus stop with 8-way warning lights, dual stop arms, and crossing arm.

Coinciding with their seating configuration, school buses have a higher seating capacity than buses of a similar length; a typical full-size school bus can carry from 66 to 90. In contrast to a transit bus, school buses are equipped with a single entry door at the front of the bus. Several configurations of entry doors are used on school buses, including center-hinged (jack-knife) and outward-opening. Prior to the 2000s, doors operated manually by the driver were the most common, with air or electric-assist becoming nearly universal in current vehicles.

School bus routes are designed with multiple bus stops, allowing for the loading (unloading) of several students at a time; the stop at school is the only time that the bus loads (unloads) passengers at once.

To inhibit pedestrians from walking into the blind spot created by the hood (or lower bodywork, on Type D buses), crossing arms are safety devices that extend outward from the front bumper when the bus door is open for loading or unloading. By design, these force passengers and other pedestrians to walk forward several feet forward of the bus, into the view of the driver, before they can cross the road in front of the bus.

In the past, handrails in the entry way posed a potential risk for to students; as passengers exited a bus, items such as drawstrings or other loose clothing could be caught if the driver was unaware and pulled away with the student caught in the door. To minimize this risk, school bus manufacturers have redesigned handrails and equipment in the stepwell area. In its School Bus Handrail Handbook, the NHTSA described a simple test procedure for identifying unsafe stepwell handrails.

==== Traffic priority ====
When loading and unloading students, school buses have the ability to stop traffic, using a system of warning lights and stop arms-a stop sign that is deployed from the bus to stop traffic when the door is opened.

By the mid-1940s, most US states introduced traffic laws requiring motorists to stop for school buses while children were loading or unloading. The justifications for this protocol were:

- Children (especially younger ones) have normally not yet developed the mental capacity to fully comprehend the hazards and consequences of street-crossing, and under US tort laws, a child cannot legally be held accountable for negligence. For the same reason, adult crossing guards often are deployed in walking zones between homes and schools.
- It is impractical in many cases to avoid children crossing the traveled portions of roadways after leaving a school bus or to have an adult accompany them.
- The size of a school bus generally limits visibility for both the children and motorists during loading and unloading.

Since at least the mid-1970s, all US states and Canadian provinces and territories have some sort of school bus traffic stop law; although each jurisdiction requires traffic to stop for a school bus loading and unloading passengers, different jurisdictions have different requirements of when to stop. Outside North America, the school bus stopping traffic to unload and load children is not provided for. Instead of being given traffic priority, fellow drivers are encouraged to drive with extra caution around school buses.

==== Warning lights and stop arms ====
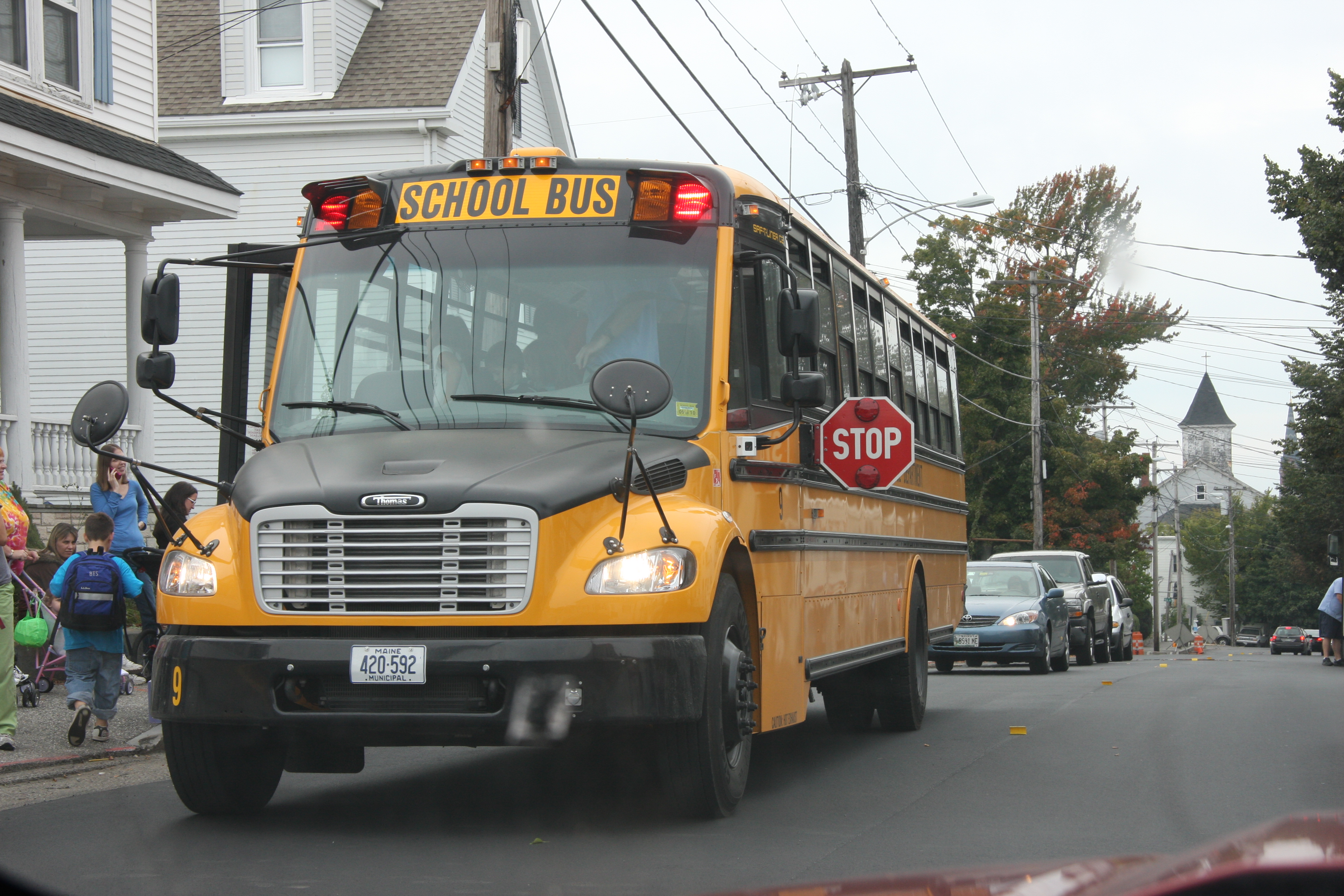
School bus with door open, red warning lights and deployed stop arm

Around 1946, the first system of traffic warning signal lights on school buses was used in Virginia, consisting of a pair of sealed beam lights. Instead of colorless glass lenses (similar to car headlamps), the warning lamps utilized red lenses. A motorized rotary switch applied power alternately to the red lights mounted at the left and right of the front and rear of the bus, creating a wig-wag effect. Activation was typically through a mechanical switch attached to the door control. However, on some buses (such as Gillig's Transit Coach models and the Kenworth-Pacific School Coach) activation of the roof warning lamp system was through the use of a pressure-sensitive switch on a manually controlled stop paddle lever located to the left of the driver's seat below the window. Whenever the pressure was relieved by extending the stop paddle, the electric current was activated to the relay. In the 1950s, plastic lenses were developed for the warning lenses, though the warning lights (with colorless glass lenses) used sealed-beam lamps into the mid-2000s, when light-emitting diodes (LEDs) came into use.

The warning lamps initially used for school buses consisted of four red warning lights. With the adoption of FMVSS 108 in January 1968, four additional lights, termed advance warning lights, were gradually added to school buses; these were amber in color and mounted inboard of the red warning lights. Intended to signal an upcoming stop to drivers, as the entry door was opened at the stop, they were wired to be overridden by the red lights and the stop sign. Although red & amber systems were adopted by many states and provinces during the 1970s and 1980s, the all-red systems remain in use by some locales such as Saskatchewan and Ontario, Canada, older buses from California, as well as on buses built in Wisconsin before 2005.

The Ontario School Bus Association has challenged the effectiveness of Ontario's all-red 8-light warning system, citing that the use of red for both advance and stop warning signals is subject to driver misinterpretation. The Association claims that many motorists only have a vague understanding of Ontario's school bus stopping laws and that few drivers know that it is legal to pass a school bus with its inner (advance) warning lights actuated. Transport Canada's Transport Development Centre compared the effectiveness of the all-red system to the amber-red system and found that drivers are 21% more likely to safely pass a school bus when presented with amber advance signals instead of red signals. Transport Canada states that amber advance signals are proven to be slightly superior to red signals and recommends that all-red warning signals be replaced by the eight-lamp system in the shortest period possible. After the issue had received media attention, a petition has been signed to make the switch from the all-red to amber advance lights on Ontario school busses. The Ministry of Ontario of Transportation (MTO) has not yet provided any plan or timeline for the change.

To aid visibility of the bus in inclement weather, school districts and school bus operators add flashing strobe lights to the roof of the bus. Some states (for example, Illinois) require strobe lights as part of their local specifications.

During the early 1950s, states began to specify a mechanical stop signal arm which the driver would deploy from the left side of the bus to warn traffic of a stop in progress. The portion of the stop arm protruding in front of traffic was initially a trapezoidal shape with stop painted on it. The U.S. National Highway Traffic Safety Administration's Federal Motor Vehicle Safety Standard No. 131 regulates the specifications of the stop arm as a double-faced regulation octagonal red stop sign at least 45 cm (17.7 in) across, with white border and uppercase legend. It must be retroreflective and/or equipped with alternately flashing red lights. As an alternative, the stop legend itself may also flash; this is commonly achieved with red LEDs. FMVSS 131 stipulates that the stop signal arm be installed on the left side of the bus, and placed so that when it is extended, the arm is perpendicular to the side of the bus, with the top edge of the sign parallel to and within 6 inches (15 cm) of a horizontal plane tangent to the bottom edge of the first passenger window frame behind the driver's window, and that the vertical center of the stop signal arm must be no more than 9 inches (23 cm) from the side of the bus. One stop signal arm is required; a second may also be installed. The second stop arm, when it is present, is usually mounted near the rear of the bus, and is not permitted to bear a stop or any other legend on the side facing forward when deployed.

The Canadian standard, defined in Canada Motor Vehicle Safety Standard No. 131, is substantially identical to the U.S. standard. In Alberta and Saskatchewan, the use of stop signal arms is banned under traffic bylaws in multiple cities, citing that they provide a false sense of safety to students by encouraging jaywalking in front of the bus rather than safely crossing at an intersection. These bans have been the subject of public debate in cities such as Regina and Prince Albert.

== Environmental impact ==
As the use of school buses transports students on a much larger scale than by car (on average, the same as 36 separate automobiles), their use reduces pollution in the same manner as carpooling. Through their usage of internal-combustion engines, school buses are not an emissions-free form of transportation (in comparison to biking or walking). As of 2017, over 95% of school buses in North America are powered by diesel-fueled engines.

While diesel offers fuel efficiency and safety advantages over gasoline, diesel exhaust fumes have become a concern (related to health problems). Since the early to mid-2000s, emissions standards for diesel engines have been upgraded considerably; a school bus meeting 2017 emissions standards is 60 times cleaner than a school bus from 2002 (and approximately 3,600 times cleaner than a counterpart from 1990). To comply with upgraded standards and regulations, diesel engines have been redesigned to use ultra-low sulfur diesel fuel with selective catalytic reduction becoming a primary emissions control strategy.

=== Alternative fuels ===
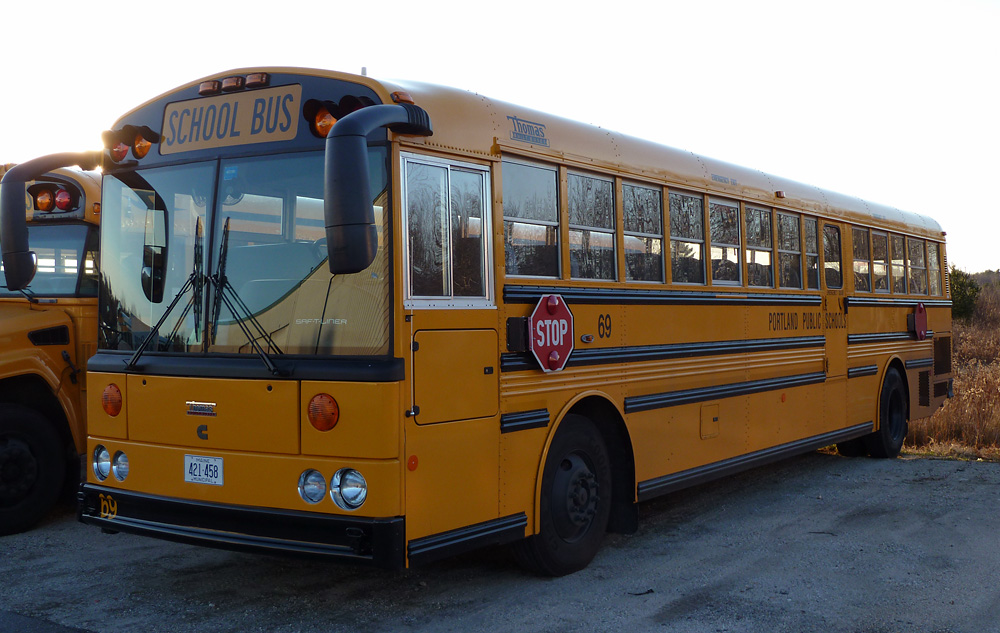
A Thomas Saf-T-Liner HDX equipped with a CNG fuel system

Although diesel fuel is most commonly used in large school buses (and even in many smaller ones), alternative fuel systems such as LPG/propane and CNG have been developed to counter the emissions drawbacks that diesel and gasoline-fueled school buses pose to the public health and environment.

The use of propane as a fuel for school buses began in the 1970s, largely as a response to the 1970s energy crisis. Initially produced as conversions of gasoline engines (as both require spark ignition), propane fell out of favor in the 1980s as fuel prices stabilized, coupled with the expanded use of diesel engines. In the late 2000s, propane-fueled powertrains reentered production as emissions regulations began to negatively affect the performance of diesel engines. In 2009, Blue Bird Corporation introduced a version of the Blue Bird Vision powered by a LPG-fuel engine. As of 2018, three manufacturers offer a propane-fuel full-size school bus (Blue Bird, IC, and Thomas), along with Ford and General Motors Type A chassis.

Compressed natural gas was first introduced for school buses in the early 1990s (with Blue Bird building its first CNG bus in 1991 and Thomas building its first in 1993). As of 2018, CNG is offered by two full-size bus manufacturers (Blue Bird, Thomas) along with Ford and General Motors Type A chassis.

In a reversal from the 1990s, gasoline-fuel engines made a return to full-size school buses during the 2010s, with Blue Bird introducing a gasoline-fuel Vision for 2016. As of current production, Blue Bird and IC offer gasoline-fuel full-size buses; gasoline engines are standard equipment in Ford and General Motors Type A chassis. As an alternative, gasoline-fuel engines offer simpler emissions equipment (over diesel engines) and a widely available fuel infrastructure (a drawback of LPG/CNG vehicles).

=== Electric school buses ===
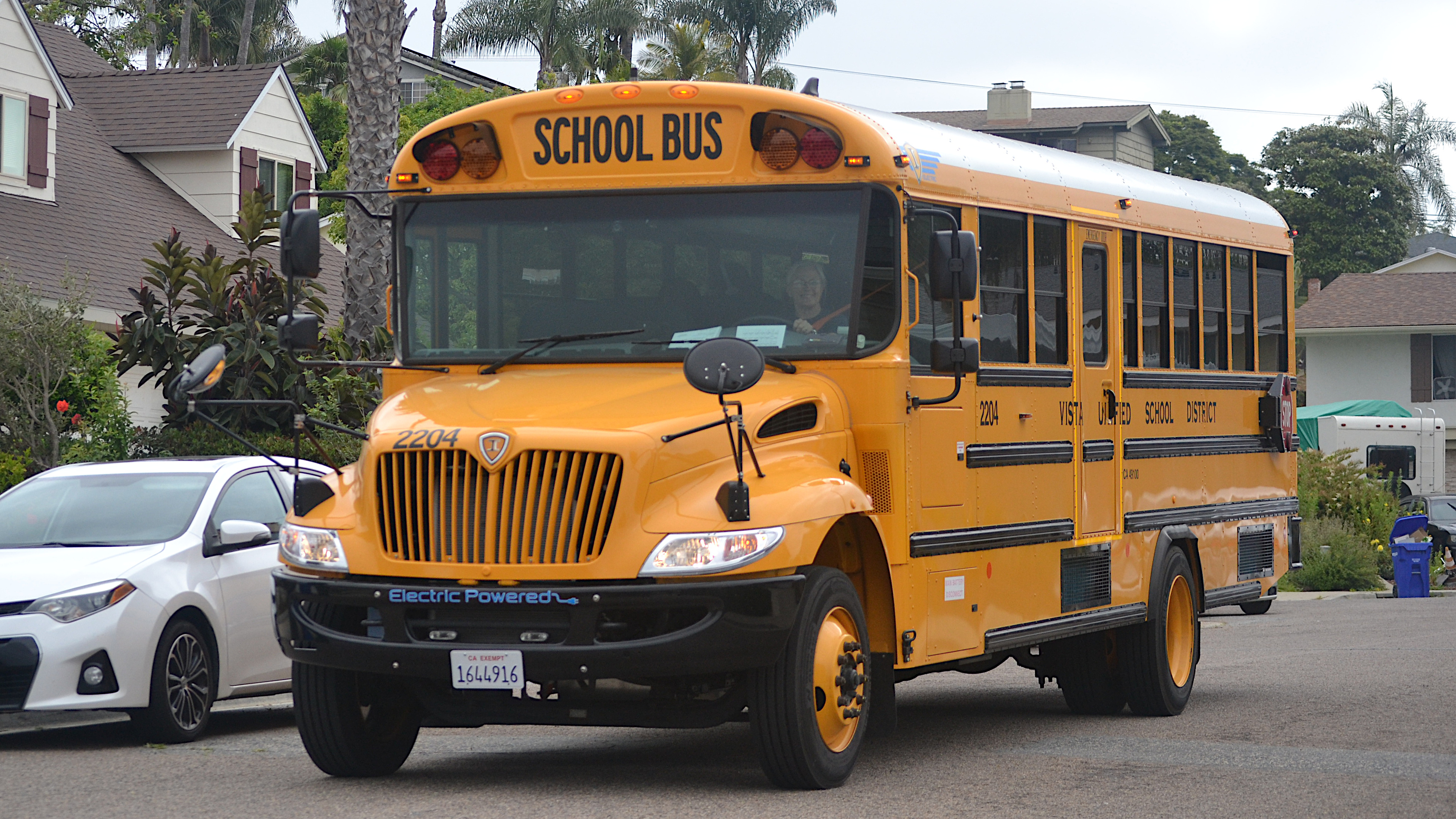
An IC CE electric school bus in California.

In theory, urban and suburban routes prove advantageous for the use of an electric bus; charging can be achieved before and after the bus is transporting students (when the bus is parked). In the early 1990s, several prototype models of battery-powered buses were developed as conversions of existing school buses; these were built primarily for research purposes.

During the 2000s, school bus electrification shifted towards the development of diesel-electric hybrid school buses. Intended as a means to minimize engine idling while loading/unloading passengers and increasing diesel fuel economy, hybrid school buses failed to gain widespread acceptance. A key factor in their market failure was their high price (nearly twice the price of a standard diesel school bus) and hybrid system complexity.

In the 2010s, school bus electrification shifted from hybrids to fully electric vehicles, with several vehicles entering production. Trans Tech introduced the 2011 eTrans prototype (based on the Smith Electric Newton cabover truck), later producing the 2014 SSTe, a derivative of the Ford E-450. The first full-size electric school bus was the Lion Bus eLion, introduced in 2015; as of 2018, over 150 examples have been produced.

During 2017 and 2018, several body manufacturers introduced prototypes of electric school buses, with electric versions of the Blue Bird All American, Blue Bird Vision, Micro Bird G5 (on Ford E450 chassis), IC CE-Series, and the Thomas Saf-T-Liner C2 previewing production vehicles. During 2018, Blue Bird, Thomas, and IC introduced prototypes of full-size school buses intended for production; Blue Bird intends to offer electric-power versions of its entire product line.

=== Walking and cycling 'buses' ===
Walking buses and bike bus (known as riding school bus for students) take their names and some of the principle of public transport in a group to travel to school for students under adult supervision.

== Other uses ==
Outside of student transport itself, the design of a school bus is adapted for use for a variety of applications. Along with newly produced vehicles, conversions of retired school buses see a large range of uses. Qualities desired from school buses involve sturdy construction (as school buses have an all-steel body and frame), a large seating capacity, and wheelchair lift capability, among others.

=== School bus derivatives ===
==== Church use ====
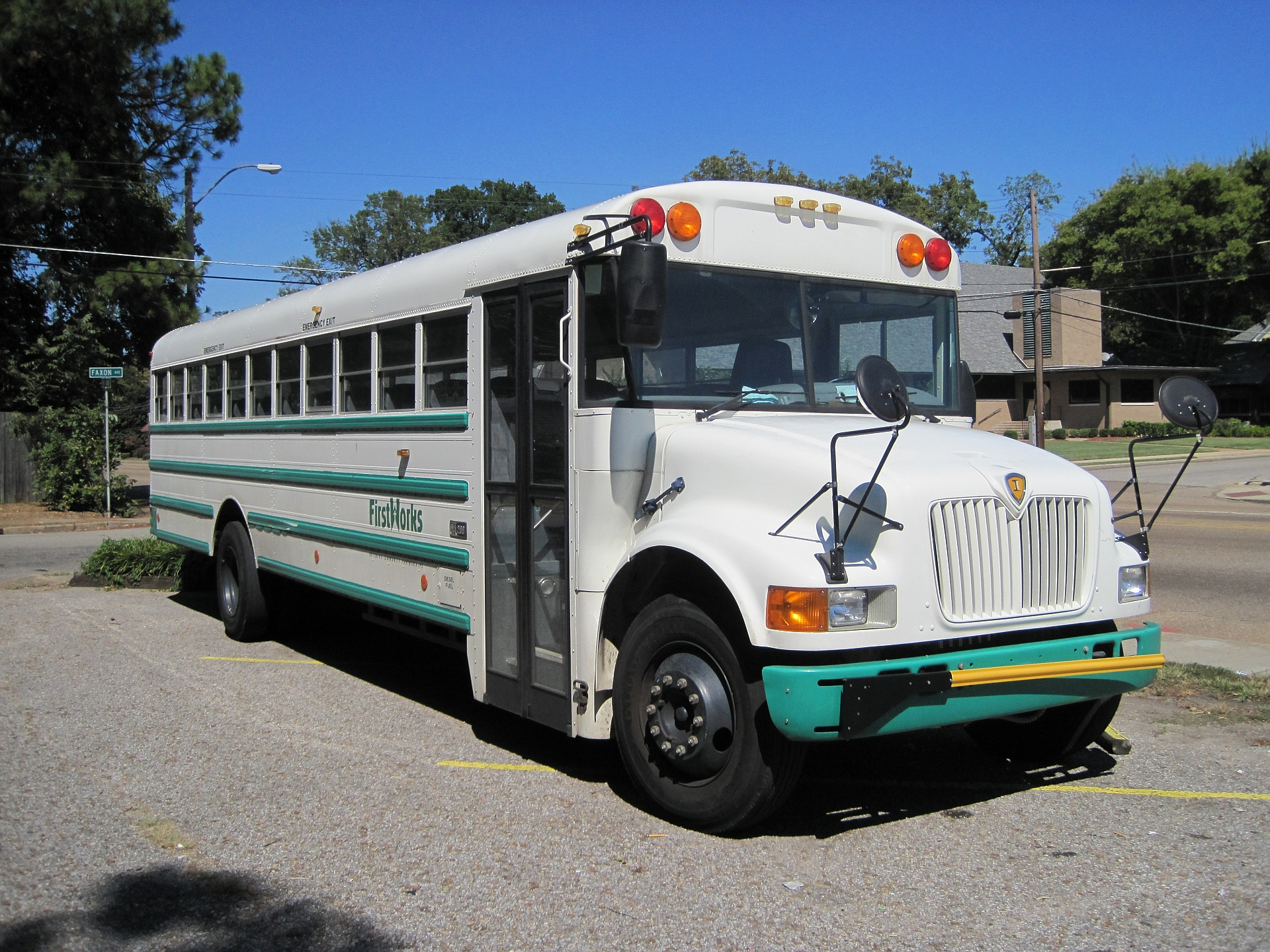
Church bus in Memphis, Tennessee

Churches throughout the United States use buses to transport their congregants, both to church services and events. A wide variety of buses are owned by churches, depending on needs and affordability. Larger buses may often be derived from school buses (newly purchased or second-hand). Other churches often own minibuses, often equipped with wheelchair lifts. When school bus derivatives are used, church bus livery is dictated by federal regulations, which require the removal of "School Bus" lettering and the disabling/removal of stop arms/warning lights. In some states, School Bus Yellow must be painted over entirely.

In church use, transporting adults and/or children, traffic law does not give church buses traffic priority in most states (Alabama, Arkansas, Kentucky, Tennessee, and Virginia being the only states where a church bus can stop traffic with flashing red lights).

==== Community outreach ====
In terms of vehicles used for community outreach, school bus bodyshells (both new and second-hand) see use as bookmobiles and mobile blood donation centers (bloodmobiles), among other uses. Both types of vehicles spend long periods of time parked in the same place; to reduce fuel consumption, they often power interior equipment and climate control with an on-board generator in place of the chassis engine.

Bookmobiles feature interior shelving for books and library equipment; bloodmobiles feature mobile phlebotomy stations and blood storage

==== Law enforcement use ====
Larger police agencies may own police buses derived from school bus bodies for a number of purposes. Along with buses with high-capacity seating serving as officer transports (in large-scale deployments), other vehicles derived from buses may have little seating, serving as temporary mobile command centers; these vehicles are built from school bus bodyshells and fitted with agency-specified equipment.

Prisoner transport vehicles are high-security vehicles used to transport prisoners; a school bus bodyshell is fitted with a specially designed interior and exterior with secure windows and doors.

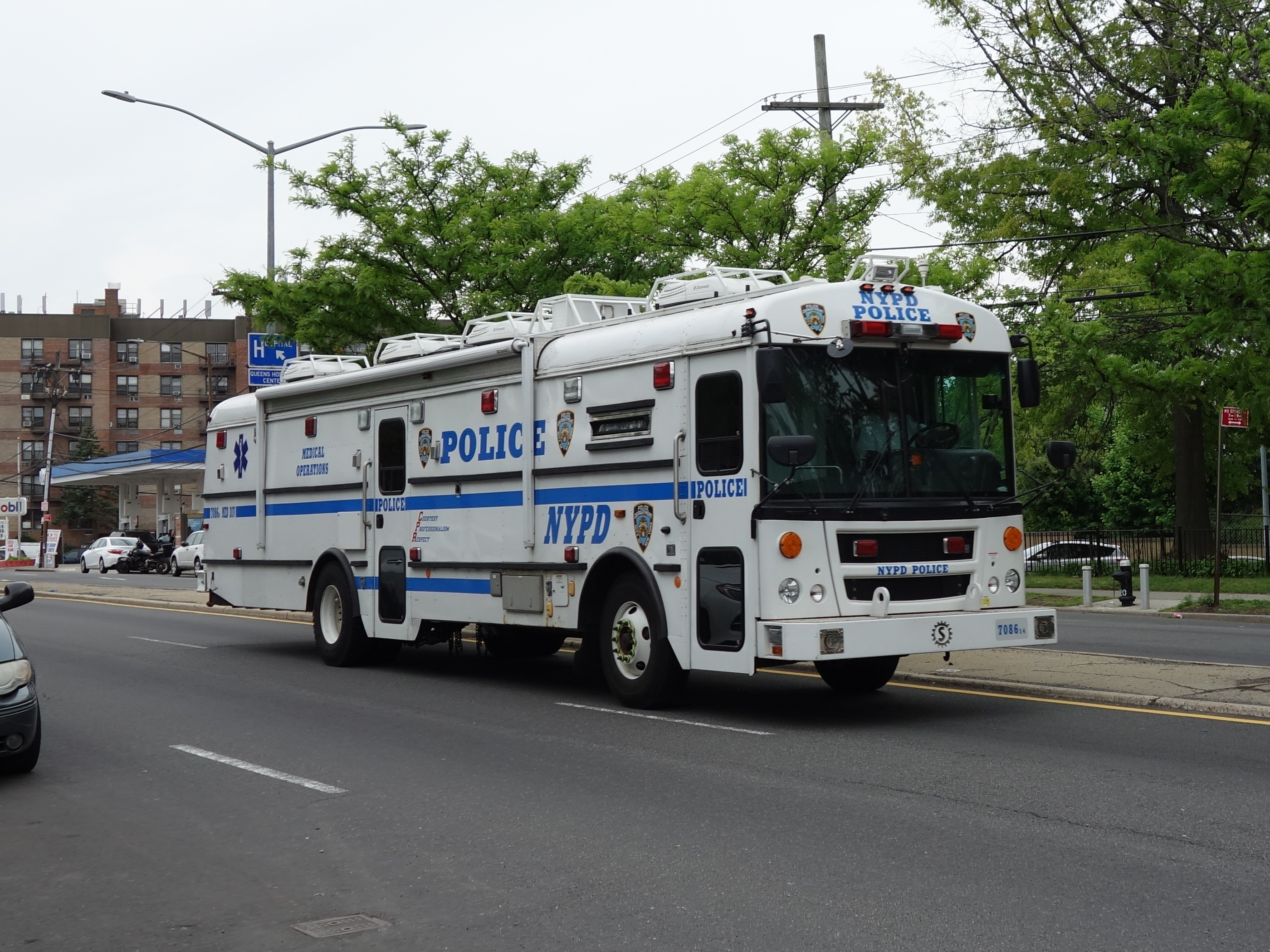
NYPD Medical Operations bus (Thomas EFX)

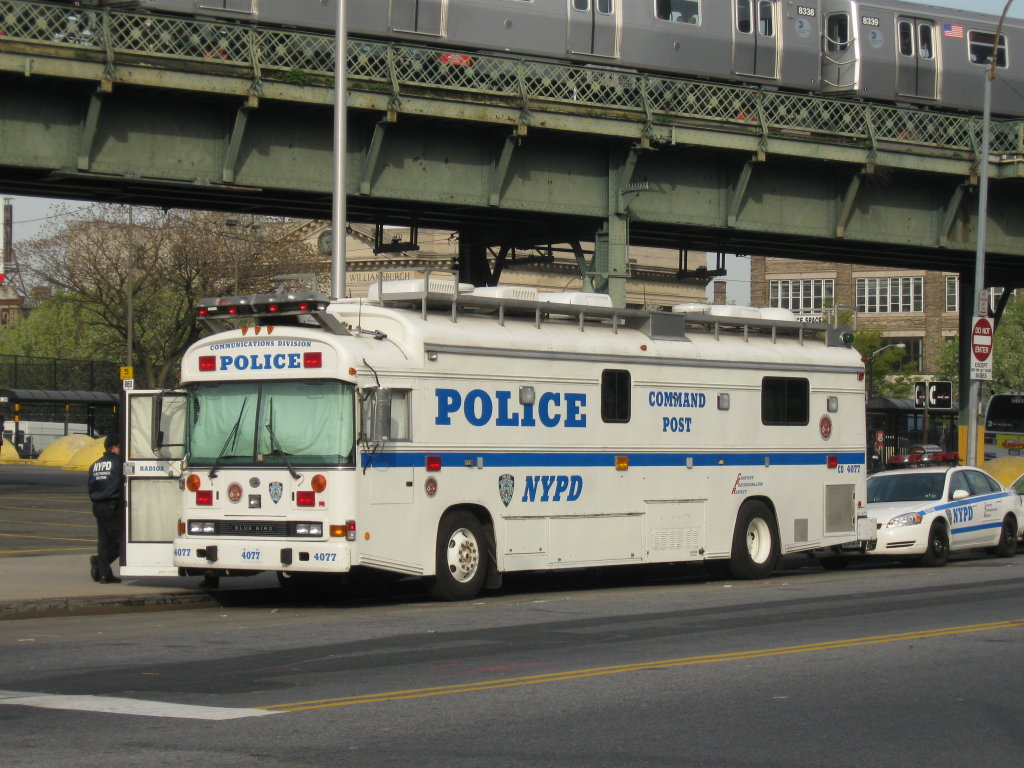
NYPD Command Post bus (Blue Bird A3RE)

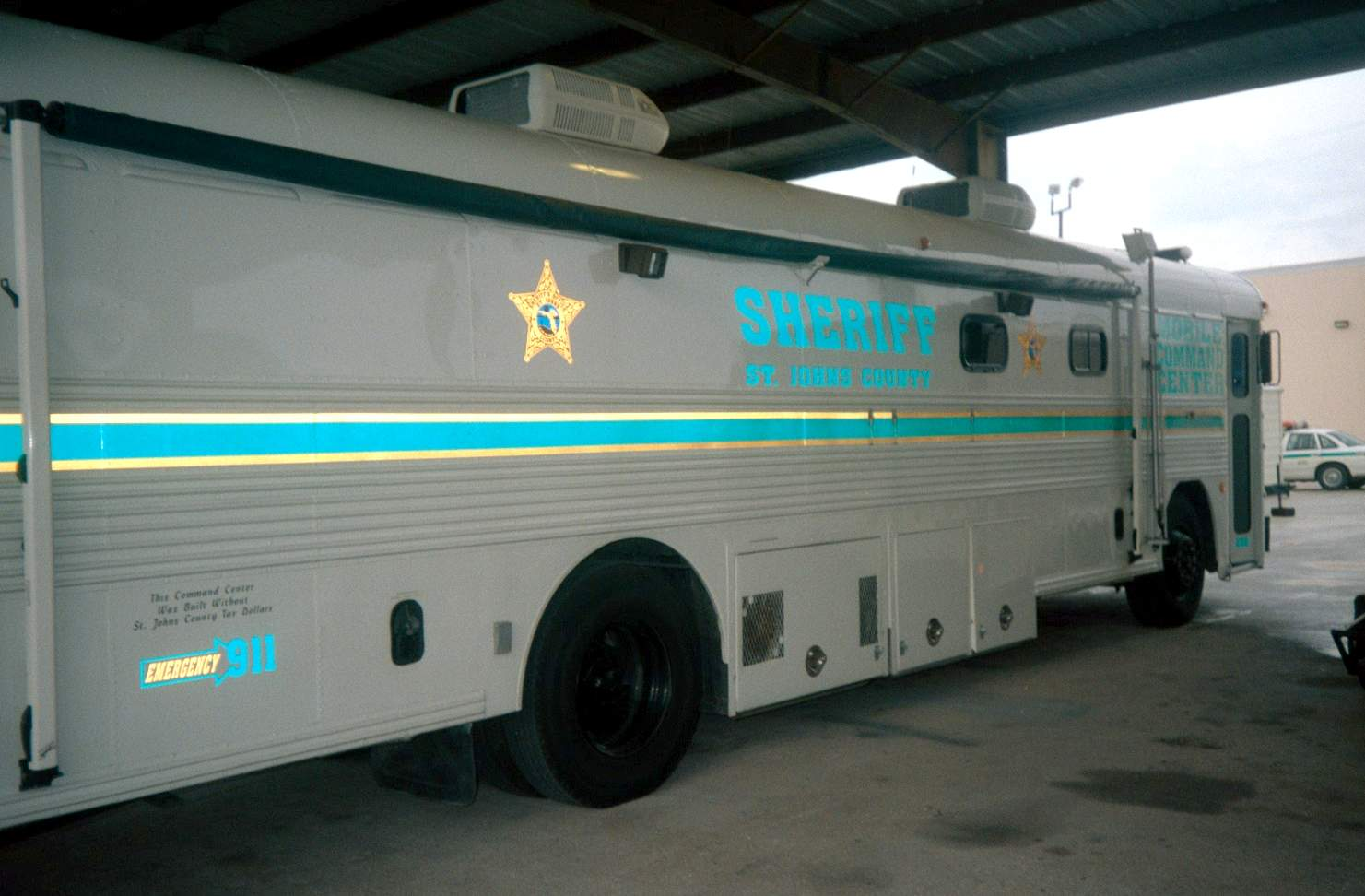
St. John's County (FL) Command Center bus (1980s Blue Bird All American), curbside view

=== Uses of retired school buses ===
As of 2016, the average age of a school bus in the United States is 9.3 years. School buses can be retired from service due to a number of factors, including vehicle age or mileage, mechanical condition, emissions compliance, or any combination of these factors. In some states and provinces, school bus retirement is called for at specific age or mileage intervals, regardless of mechanical condition. In recent years, budget concerns in many publicly funded school districts have necessitated that school buses be kept in service longer.

When a school bus is retired from school use, it can see a wide variety of usage. While a majority are scrapped for parts and recycling (a requirement in some states), better-running examples are put up for sale as surplus vehicles. Second-hand school buses are sold to such entities as churches, resorts or summer camps; others are exported to Central America, South America, or elsewhere. Other examples of retired school buses are preserved and restored by collectors and bus enthusiasts; collectors and museums have an interest in older and rarer models. Additionally, restored school buses appear alongside other period vehicles in television and film.

When a school bus is sold for usage outside of student transport, NHTSA regulations require that its identification as a school bus be removed. To do so, all school bus lettering must be removed or covered while the exterior must be painted a color different than school bus yellow; the stop arm(s) and warning lamps must be removed or disabled.

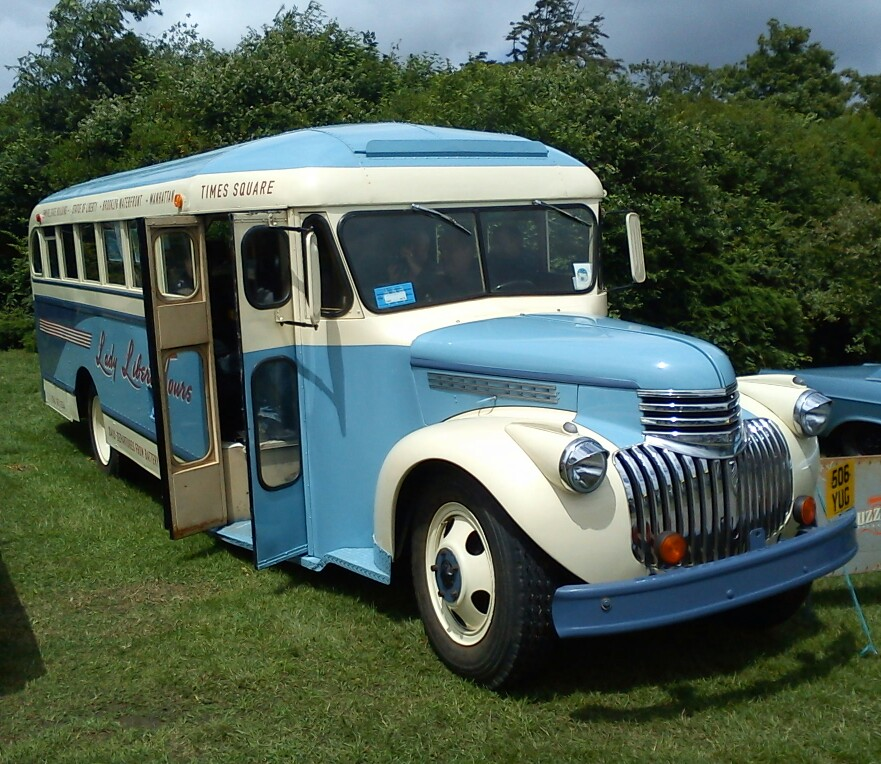
1942 Gillig/Chevrolet in use as a tour bus

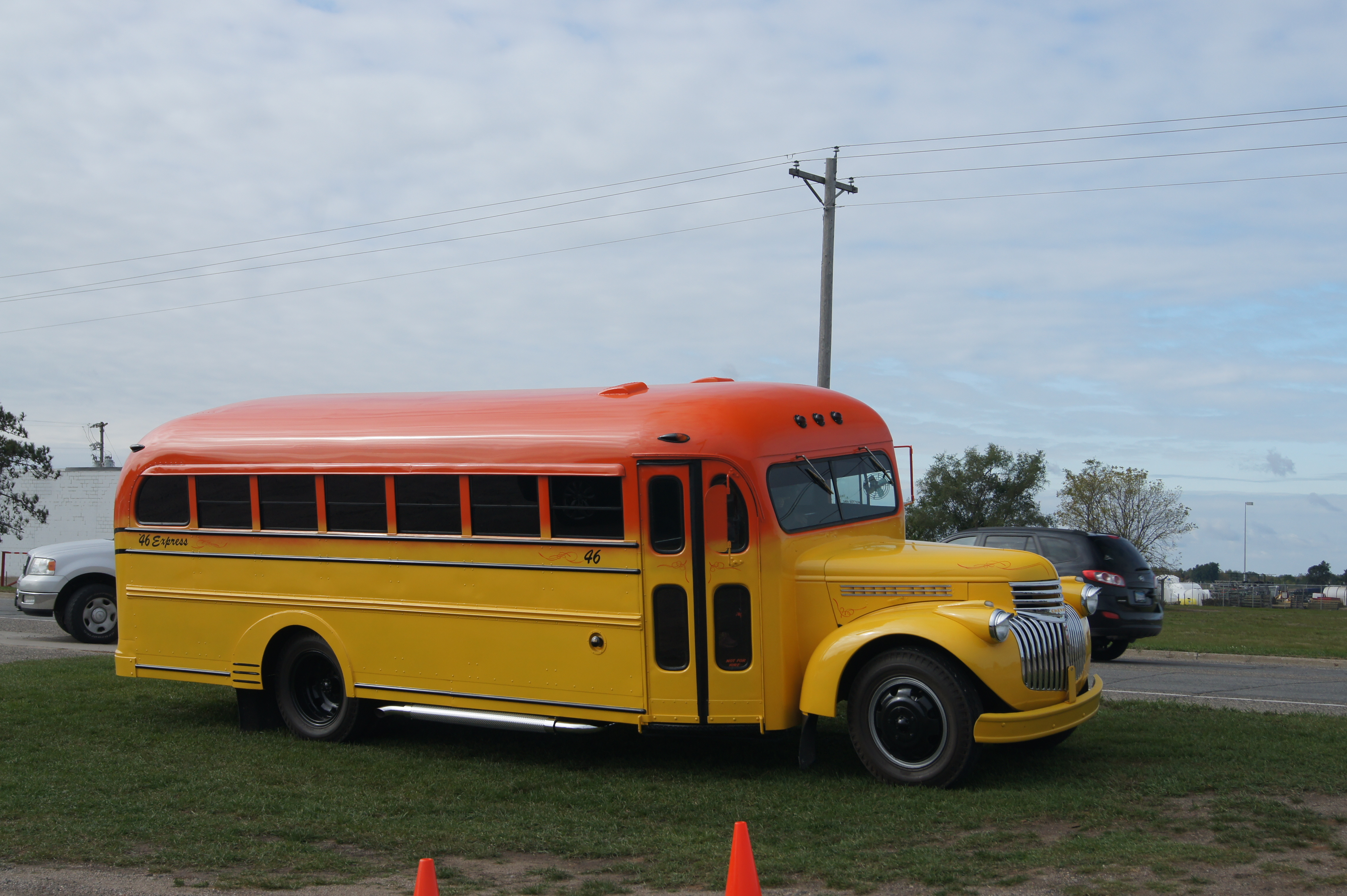
1946 Chevrolet school bus restored and customized

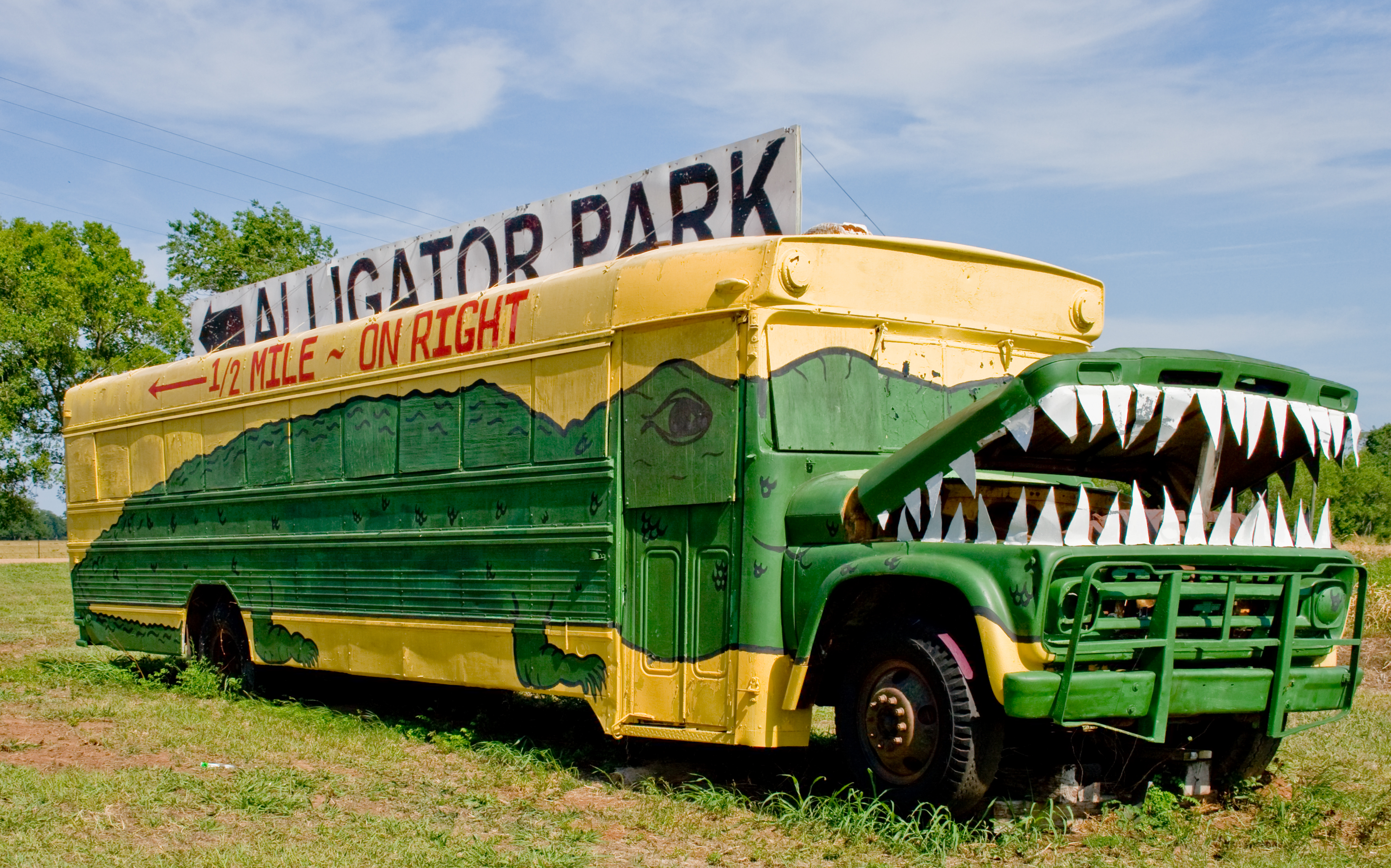
The "Gator Bus", a 1960s Wayne/Chevrolet school bus repurposed as a sign for an alligator park in Louisiana

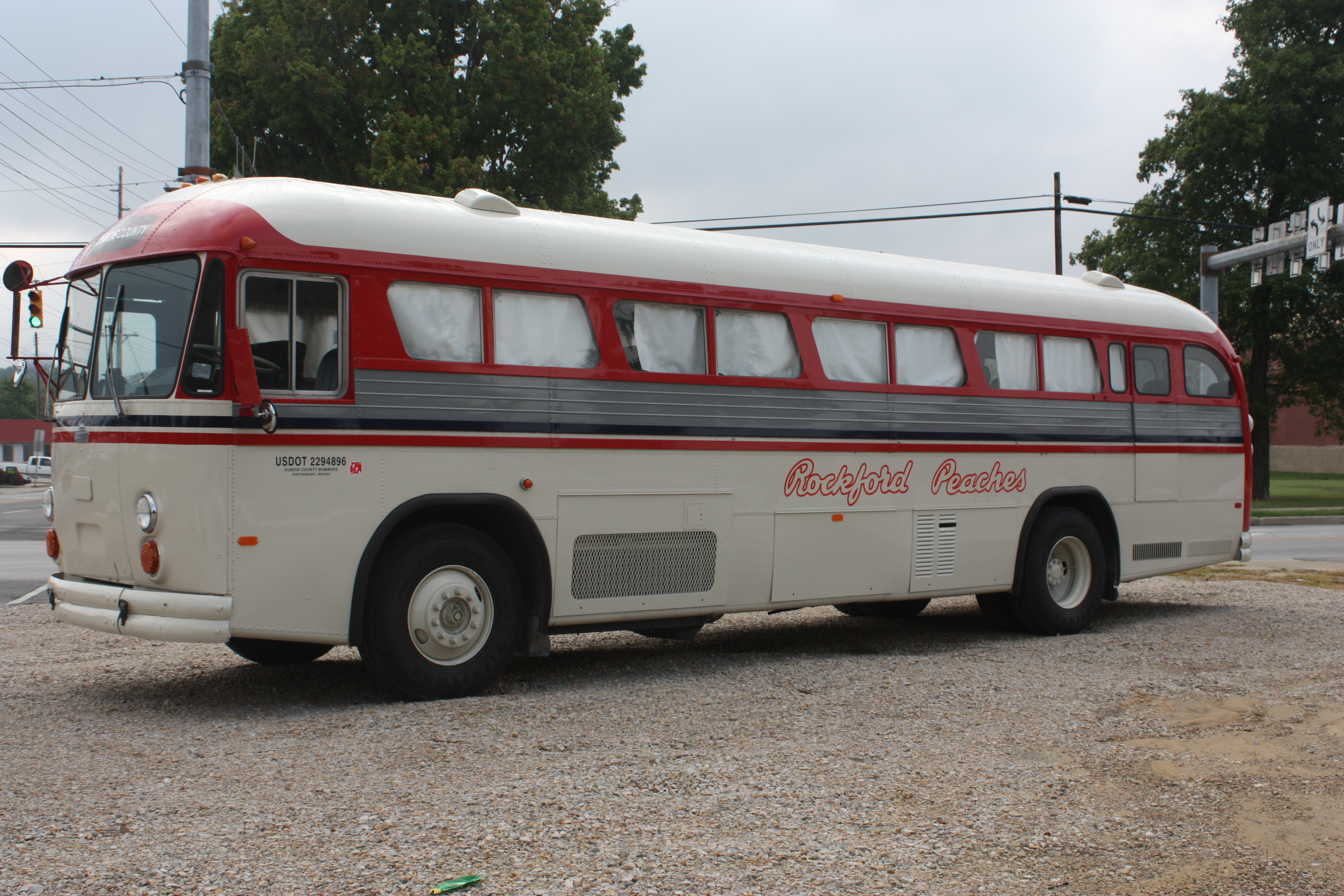
1980s Crown Supercoach restored, painted to match the bus from A League of Their Own

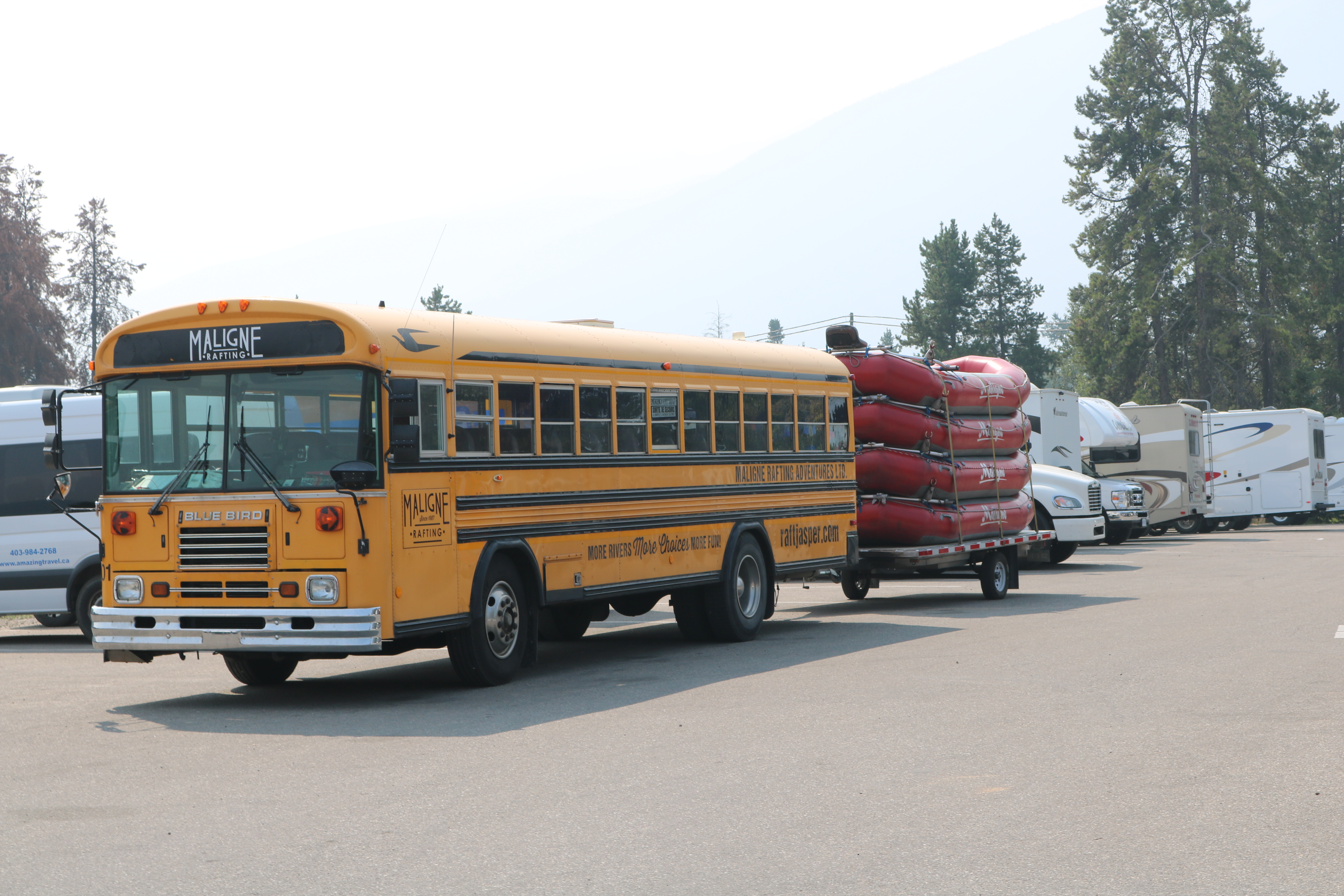
Former school bus (Blue Bird TC/2000 FE) now repurposed as a rafting shuttle

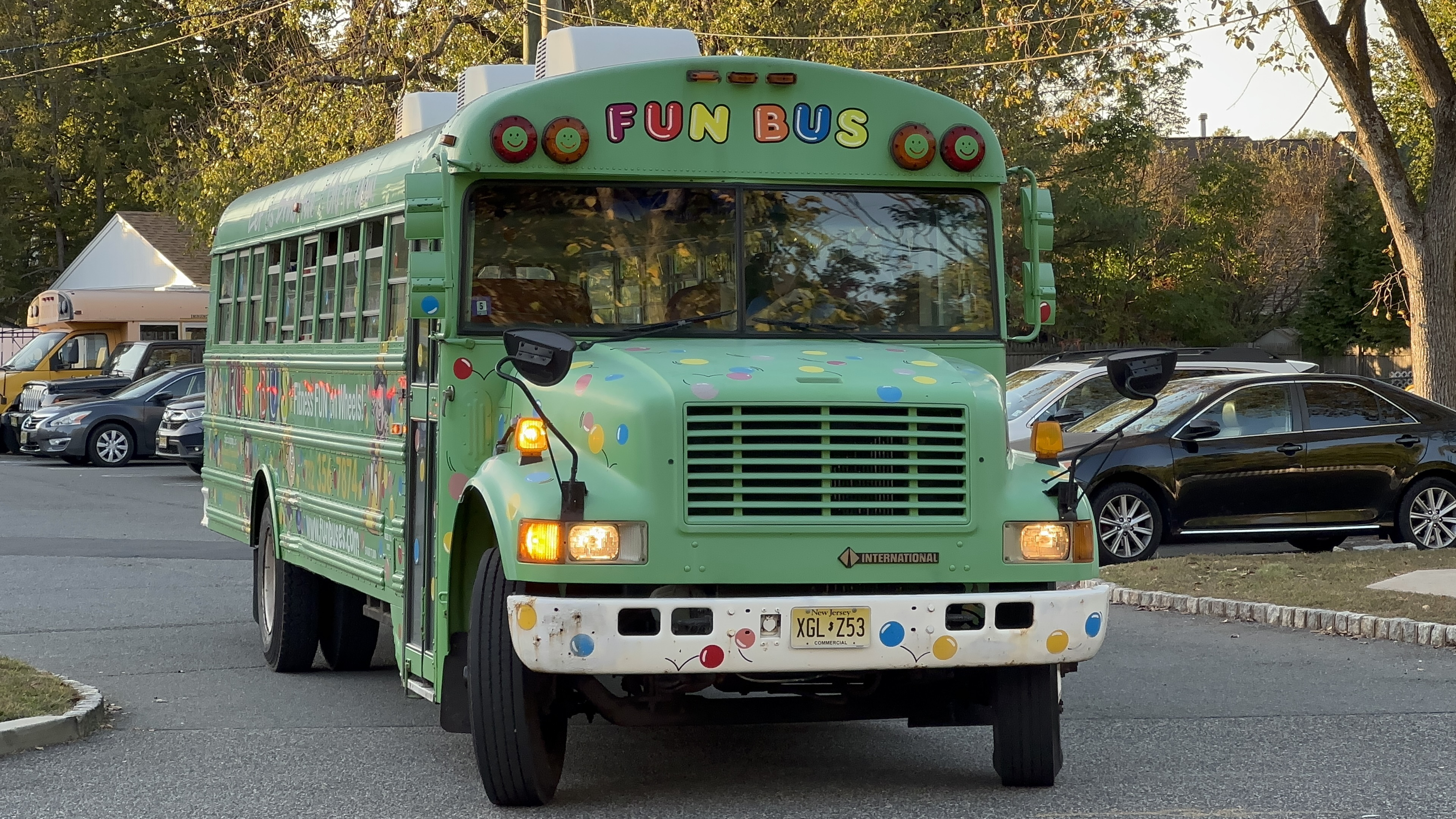
1997 Thomas International 3800 as a mobile kid's gym bus under Fun Bus.

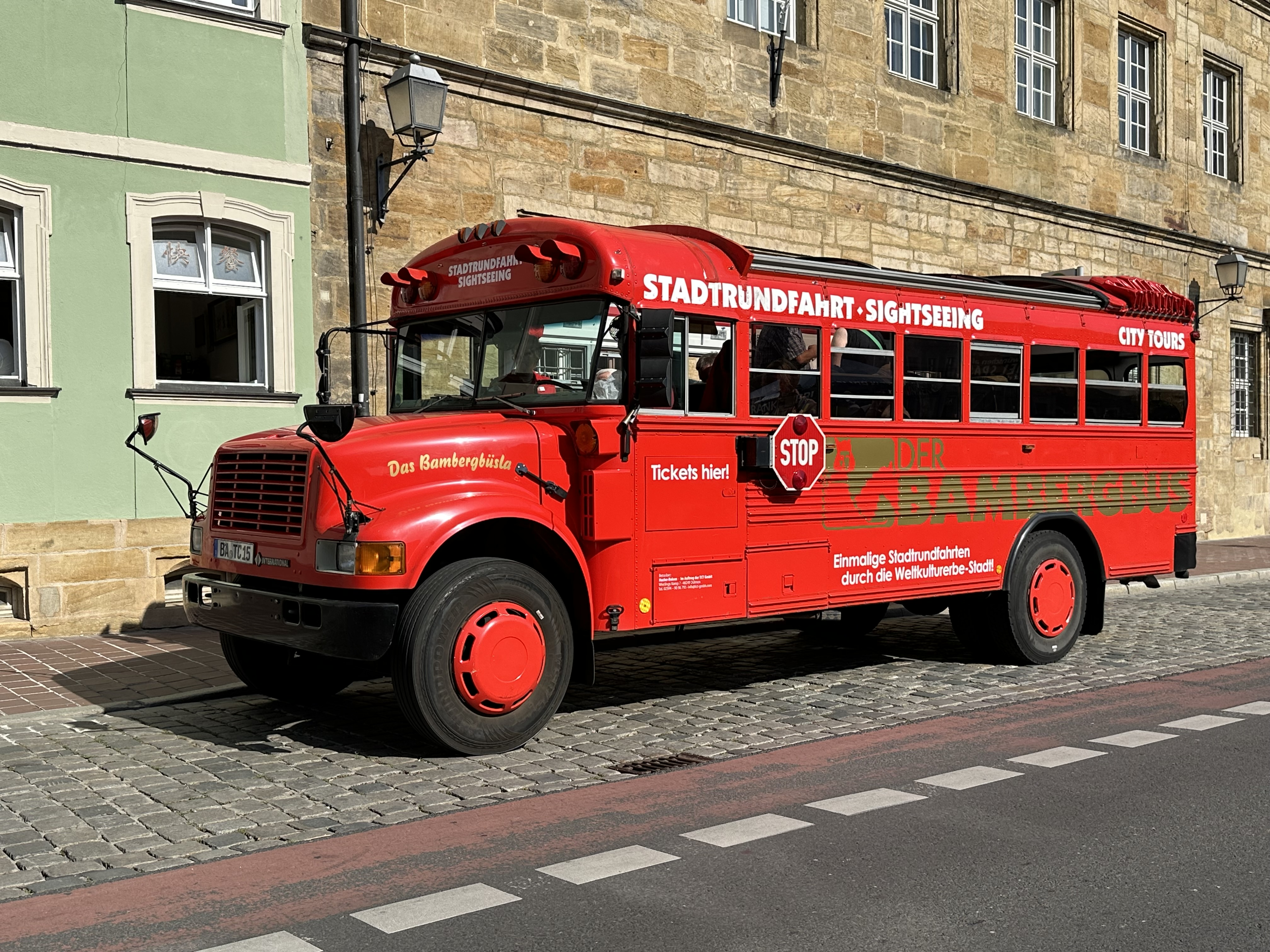
2003 Blue Bird International 3800 as a sightseeing hop on hop off bus in Bamberg, Germany.

==== School bus conversions ====
In retirement, not all school buses live on as transport vehicles. In contrast, the purchasers of school buses use the large body and chassis to use as either a working vehicle, or as a basis to build a rolling home. To build a utility vehicle for farms, owners often remove much of the roof and sides, creating a large flatbed or open-bed truck for hauling hay. Other farms use unconverted, re-painted, school buses to transport their workforce.

Skoolies are retired school buses converted into recreational vehicles (the term also applies to their owners and enthusiasts). Constructed and customized by their owners; while some examples have primitive accommodations, others rival the features of production RVs. Exteriors vary widely, including only the removal of school bus lettering, conservative designs, or the bus equivalent of an art car. An example of a Skoolie is Further, a 1939 (and later, 1947) school bus converted by Ken Kesey and the Merry Pranksters, intended for use on cross-country counterculture road trips. Both versions of Further are painted with a variety of psychedelic colors and designs.

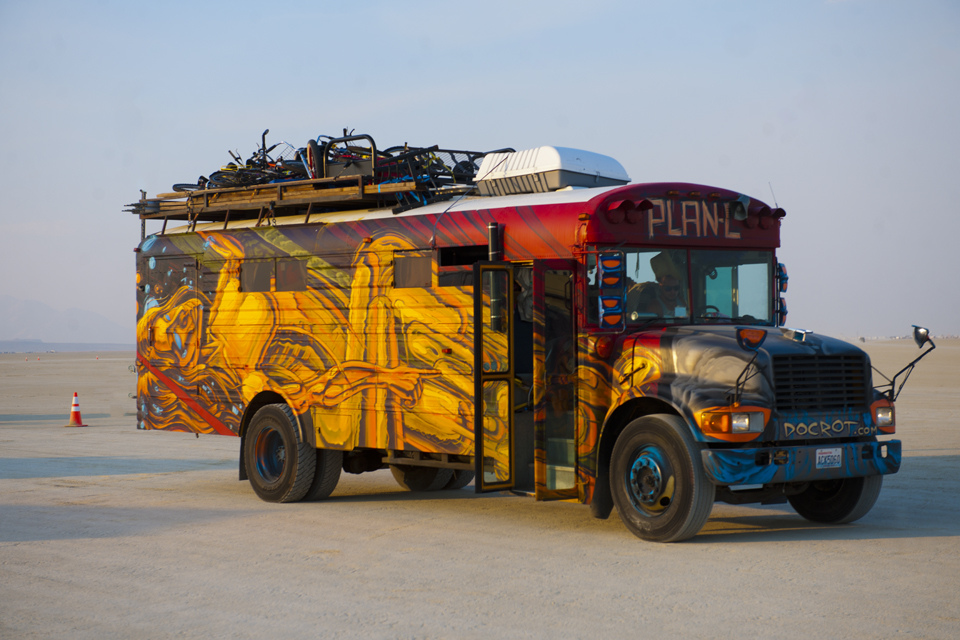
1990s school bus conversion at 2013 Burning Man

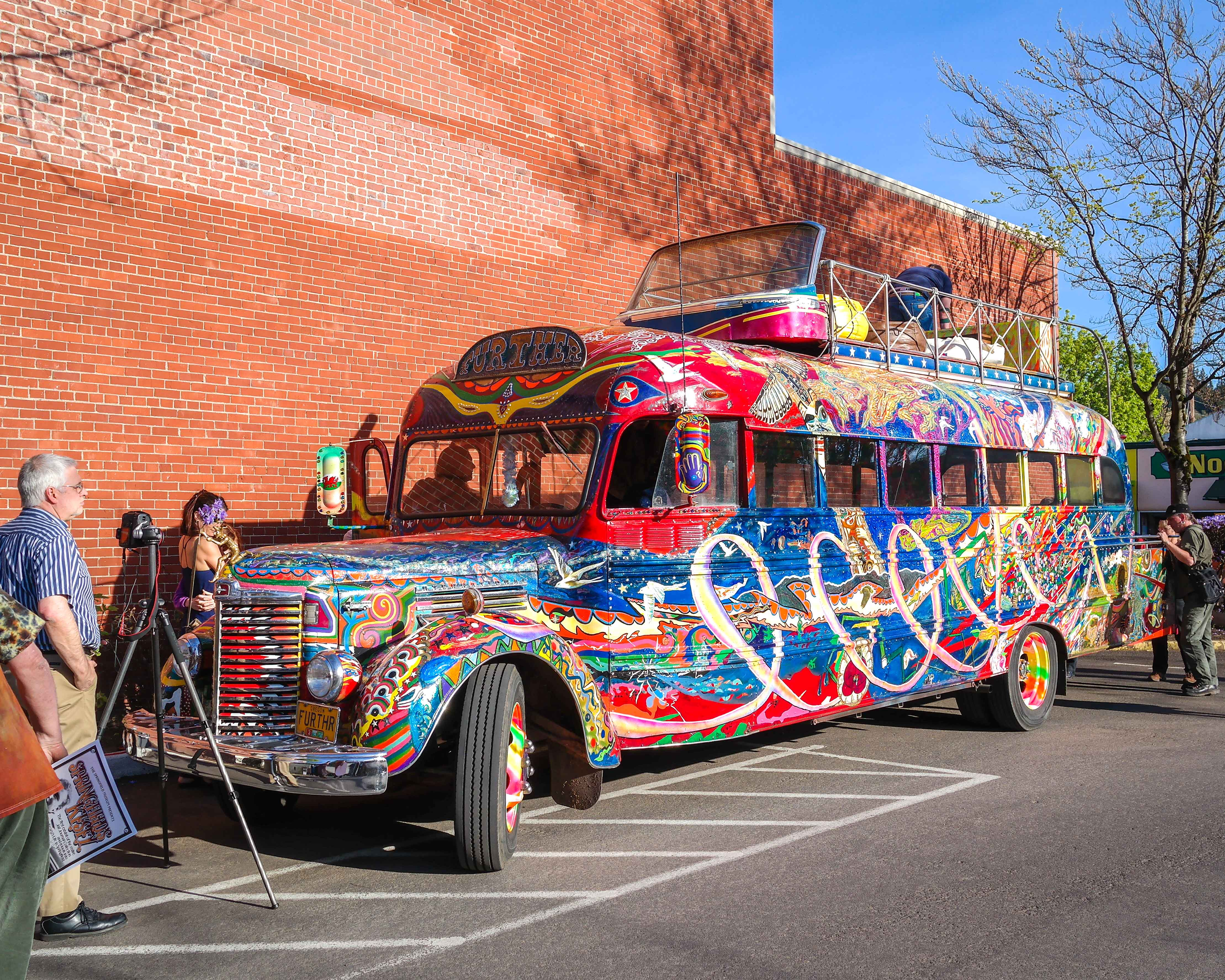
Further (1947 version)

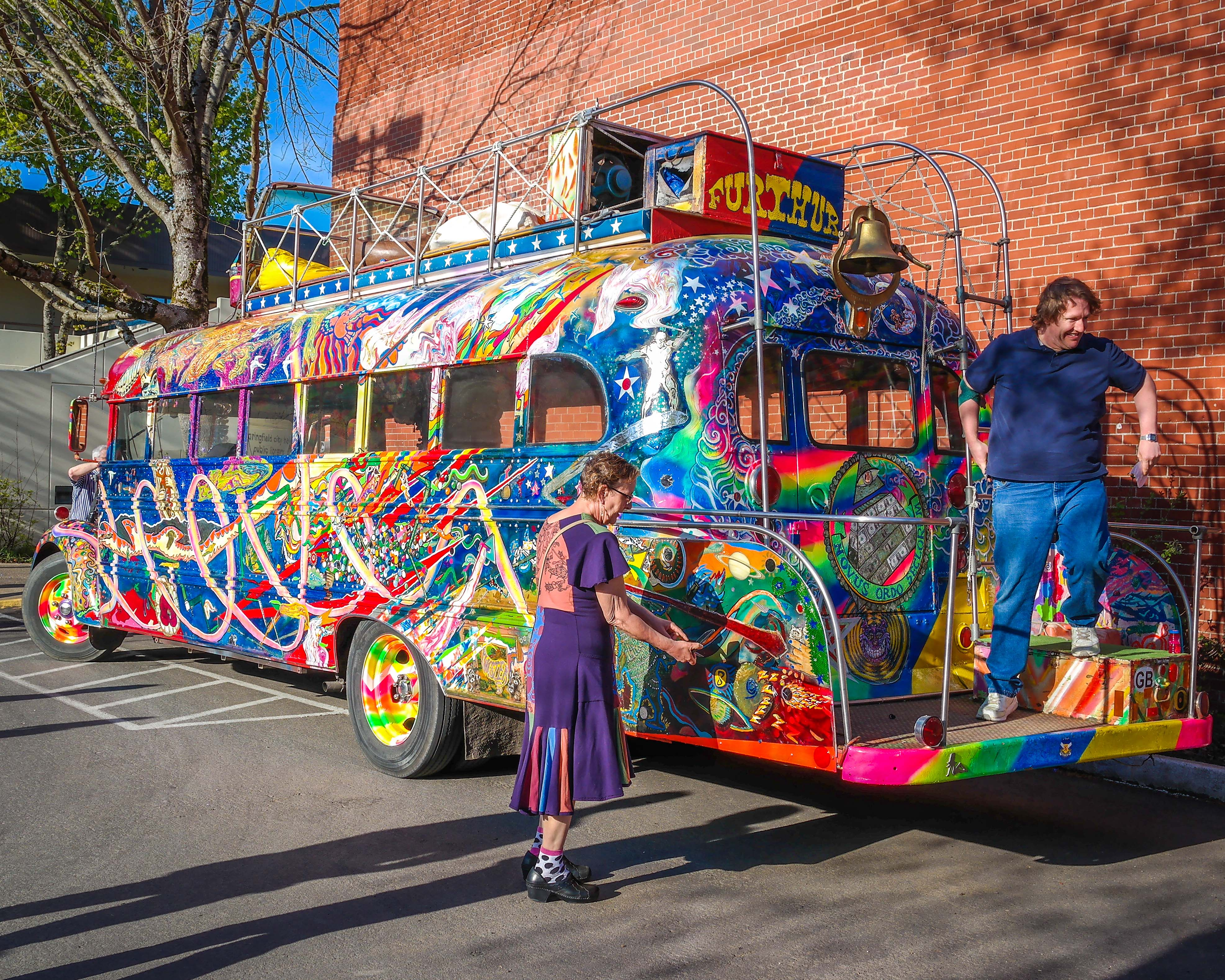
Further (1947 version), rear

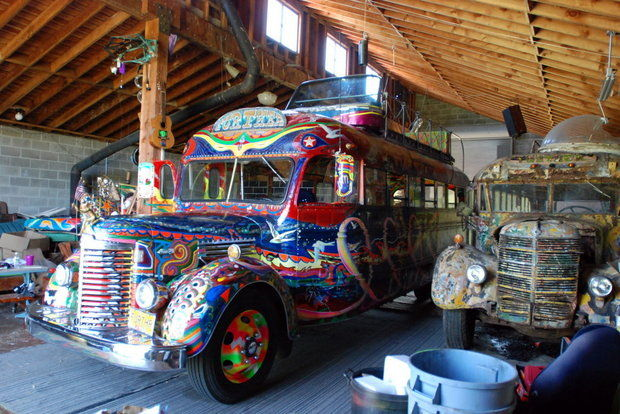
Both versions of Further (1939 at right)

=== School bus export ===
Retired school buses from Canada and the United States are sometimes exported to Africa, Central America, South America, or elsewhere. Used as public transportation between communities, these buses are nicknamed "chicken buses" for both their crowded accommodation and the (occasional) transportation of livestock alongside passengers. To attract passengers (and fares), yellow buses are often repainted with flamboyant exterior color schemes and modified with chrome exterior trim.

== Around the world ==
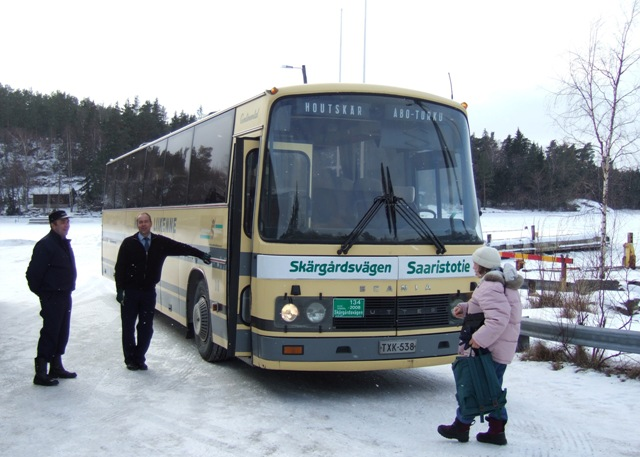
A school bus along the Skärgårdsvägen road in Pargas, Finland

Outside the United States and Canada, the usage and design of buses for student transport varies worldwide. In Europe, Asia, and Australia, buses utilized for student transport may be derived from standard transit buses. Alongside differences in body, chassis, engines, and seating design, school buses outside North America differ primarily in their signage, livery, and traffic priority.

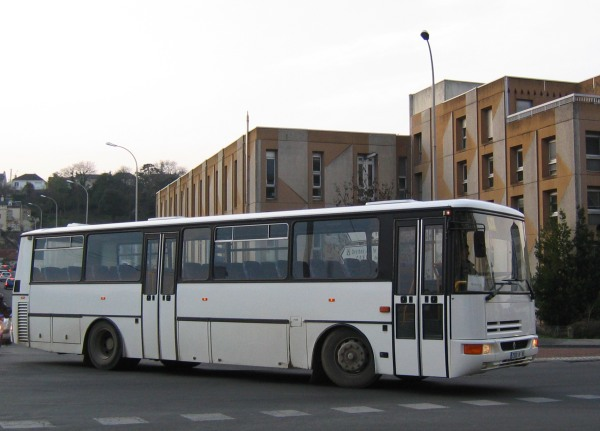
Karosa Récréo, Czech school bus between Karosa models C 935 and the C 955 in France

== See also ==
- Desegregation busing in the United States
- List of school bus manufacturers
- The Magic School Bus, American children's book, television, and video game series
- Bike bus
- Walking bus
