= Diablo =

Diablo or El Diablo is the Spanish word for 'devil'. It may refer to:

== Arts and entertainment ==
=== Fictional entities ===
- Diablo (Disney), a raven in Sleeping Beauty
- Diablo (Marvel Comics), a Fantastic Four villain
- El Diablo (character), several fictional characters from DC Comics
- Diablo, a character in the Diablo video game series
  - a playable character in the video game Heroes of the Storm
- a character in the video game Primal Rage
- El Diablo, a superhero in the video game Freedom Force
- El Diablo, a character in The SpongeBob Movie: Sponge on the Run

=== Film and television ===
- El Diablo (1990 film), an American Western comedy
- Diablo (2011 film), an Argentinian drama
- Diablo (2015 film), Canadian-American revisionist Western psychological thriller
- Diablo (2025 film), Colombian-American action thriller film
- "El Diablo" (The Killing), a 2011 episode of the TV series

=== Gaming ===
- Diablo (series), a video game series
  - Diablo (video game), the first game of the series
    - Diablo: Hellfire, a 1997 expansion
  - Diablo II, the second game of the series
    - Diablo II: Lord of Destruction, a 2001 expansion
    - Diablo II: Resurrected, a 2021 remaster
  - Diablo III, the third game of the series
    - Diablo III: Reaper of Souls, a 2014 expansion
  - Diablo IV, the fourth game of the series
  - Diablo Immortal, a mobile game set between Diablo 2 and Diablo 3.

=== Music ===
- Diablo (band), a Finnish metal band

==== Albums ====
- El Diablo (album), by Italian rock band Litfiba
- Diablo II Soundtrack, the soundtrack of video game music from Diablo II.

==== Songs ====
- "Diablo" (song), 2014 song by Mac Miller
- "Diablo", a 2001 song by Alejandra Guzmán from Soy
- "Diablo", a 2018 song by Simon Curtis
- "Diablo", a 2019 song by Ilira & Juan Magán
- "Diablo", a 2022 song by Rosalía from Motomami
- "El Diablo", a 1959 song by Frankie Laine
- "El Diablo", a 1976 song by ZZ Top from Tejas
- "El Diablo", a 1980 song by Grace Slick from Dreams
- "El Diablo", a 1985 song by Arcadia from So Red the Rose
- "El Diablo" (Machine Gun Kelly song), 2019
- "El Diablo" (Elena Tsagrinou song), 2021
- "Mt. Diablo", a 2010 song by The Story So Far from The Story So Far/Maker split and Under Soil and Dirt

== People ==
- El Diablo (nickname), a list of people known by the nickname
- Diablo Cody (born 1978), pen name of American screenwriter, producer and director Brook Busey-Maurio
- Diablo Velasco (1919–1999), ring name of Mexican professional wrestler and trainer Cuahutémoc Velasco Vargas
- Don Diablo (born 1980), Dutch DJ and producer
- Tommy Diablo, ring name of Armando Gorbea, Puerto Rican professional wrestler
- Danny Diablo (born 1971), a.k.a. Lord Ezec, recording artist, record producer, graffiti painter, actor and model

== Places ==
- Diablo, Panama

=== United States ===
- Diablo, California, a census-designated place
- Diablo Dam, named after Diablo Canyon, Washington, on the Skagit River
  - Diablo, Washington, a company town for the dam
  - Diablo Lake, a reservoir impounded by the dam
- Diablo Range, a mountain range in California
- Diablo Valley, California
  - Mount Diablo, California
- Canyon Diablo (disambiguation)
- Diablo Canyon (disambiguation)
- Diablo Mountains (disambiguation)

== Sports ==
- Atlantic City Diablos, an American men's soccer team 2007–2008
  - Atlantic City Diablos (WPSL)
- El Paso Diablos, two American baseball teams
- San Francisco Bay Diablos, an American soccer team 1993–1995
- Mission Viejo High School, known as Diablos
- Toluca FC, nicknamed Diablos Rojos

== Other uses ==
- Diablos Motorcycle Club, an American outlaw motorcycle club
- Diablos Motorcycle Club (founded 1999), in Thailand
- Diablo homolog (DIABLO), a mitochondrial protein
- Diablo sandwich, originating from Smokey and the Bandit
- Diablo Data Systems, a division of Xerox
  - Diablo 630, a daisy wheel printer
- Diablo wind, a type of hot, dry wind
- USS Diablo (SS-479), an American submarine, later PNS Ghazi
- Lamborghini Diablo, a sports car
- "El Diablo", a cocktail variation of a Buck

== See also ==
- Diabolo (disambiguation)
- Diabolos (disambiguation)
