= Diabolos (disambiguation) =

Diabolos is a 2005 album by Gackt.

Diabolos may also refer to:

- Diabolos (διάβολος), a Greek word often translated as Devil
- "Diabolos", a song by Balzac from Terrifying! Art of Dying – The Last Men on Earth II, 2002
- "Diabolos", a song by Dir En Grey from Dum Spiro Spero, 2011
- "Diabolos", a song by Koffi Olomide

== See also ==
- Diabolo (disambiguation)
- Diabolus in musica (disambiguation)
- Diablo (disambiguation)
