= San Ramon Valley Unified School District =

School district in California, United States

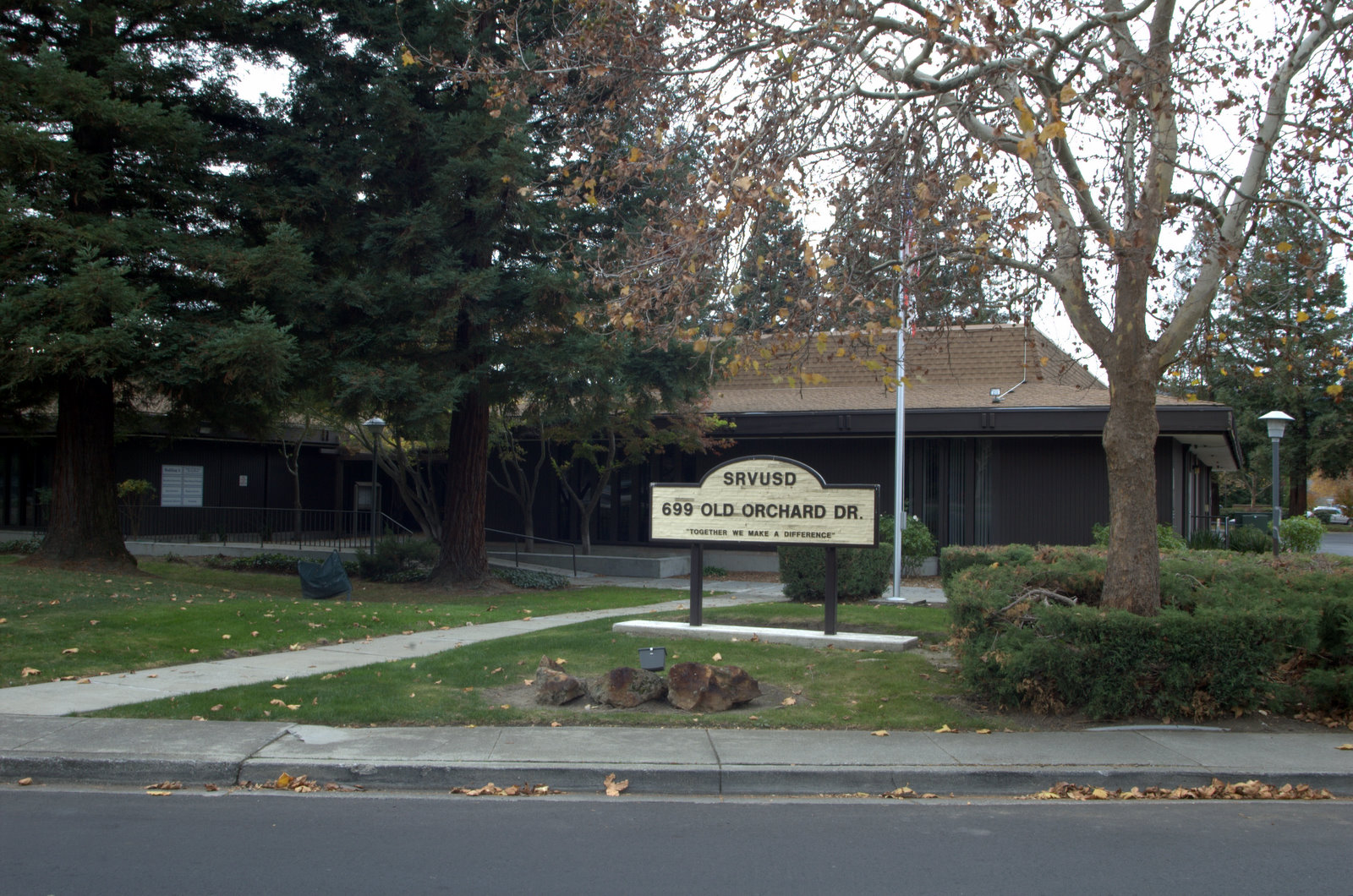
- SRVUSD Headquarters in Danville, CA

District information
- Established: 1964
- Superintendent: CJ Cammack
- Enrollment: 28,615

Other information
- Website: srvusd.net

The San Ramon Valley Unified School District (SRVUSD) is a public school district in Contra Costa County, California. It has 36 school sites serving more than 32,000 students within the communities of Alamo, Danville, Blackhawk, Diablo, and San Ramon. It was founded in 1964.

== Boundary ==
The district includes: Blackhawk, Camino Tassajara, Danville, Diablo, Norris Canyon, and San Ramon. It also includes the majority of Alamo and a small portion of Walnut Creek.

== Schools ==
=== High schools ===
- California High School (San Ramon)
- Dougherty Valley High School (San Ramon)
- Monte Vista High School (Danville/Alamo)
- San Ramon Valley High School (Danville)

=== Middle schools ===
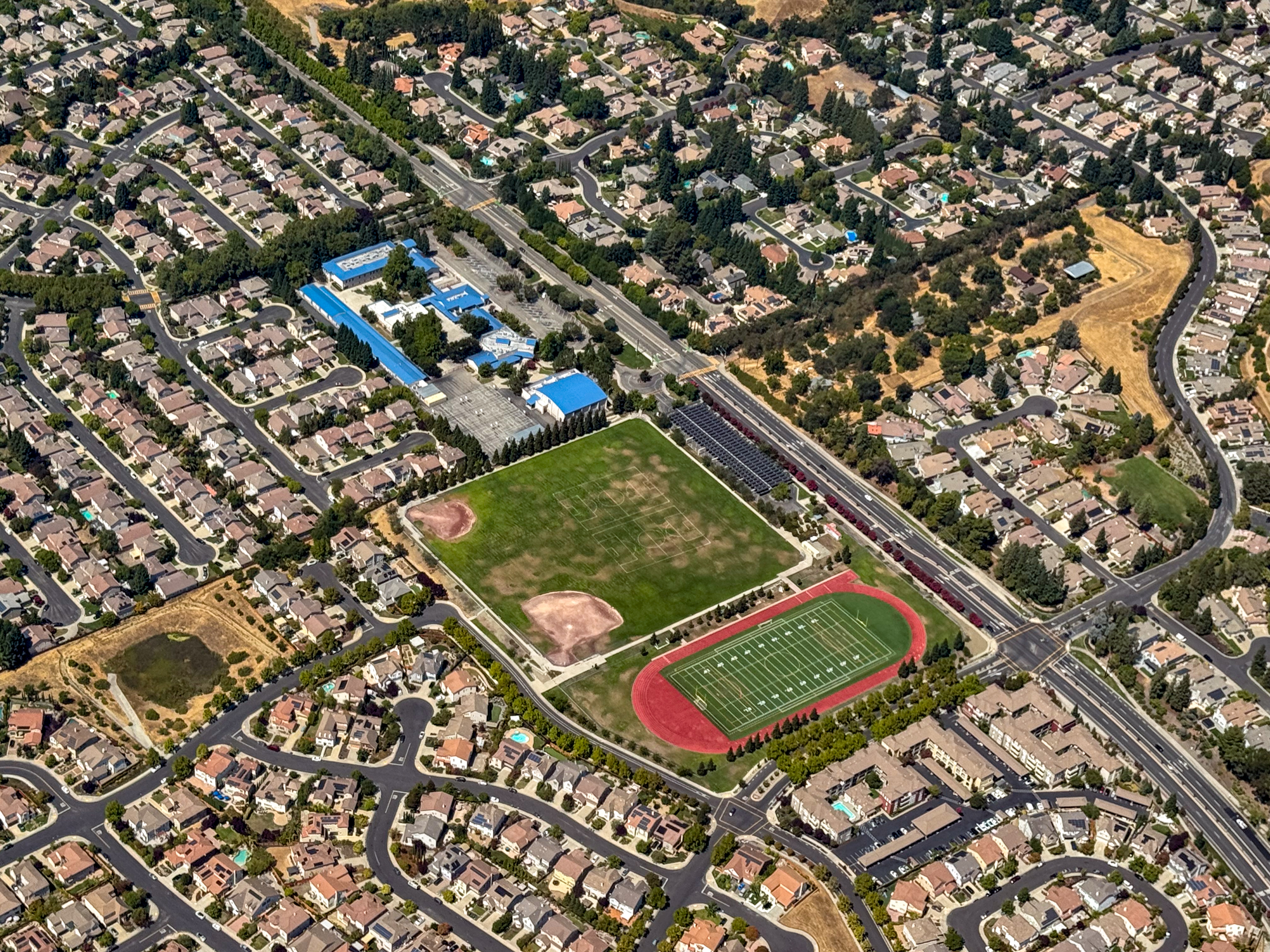
Diablo Vista Middle School

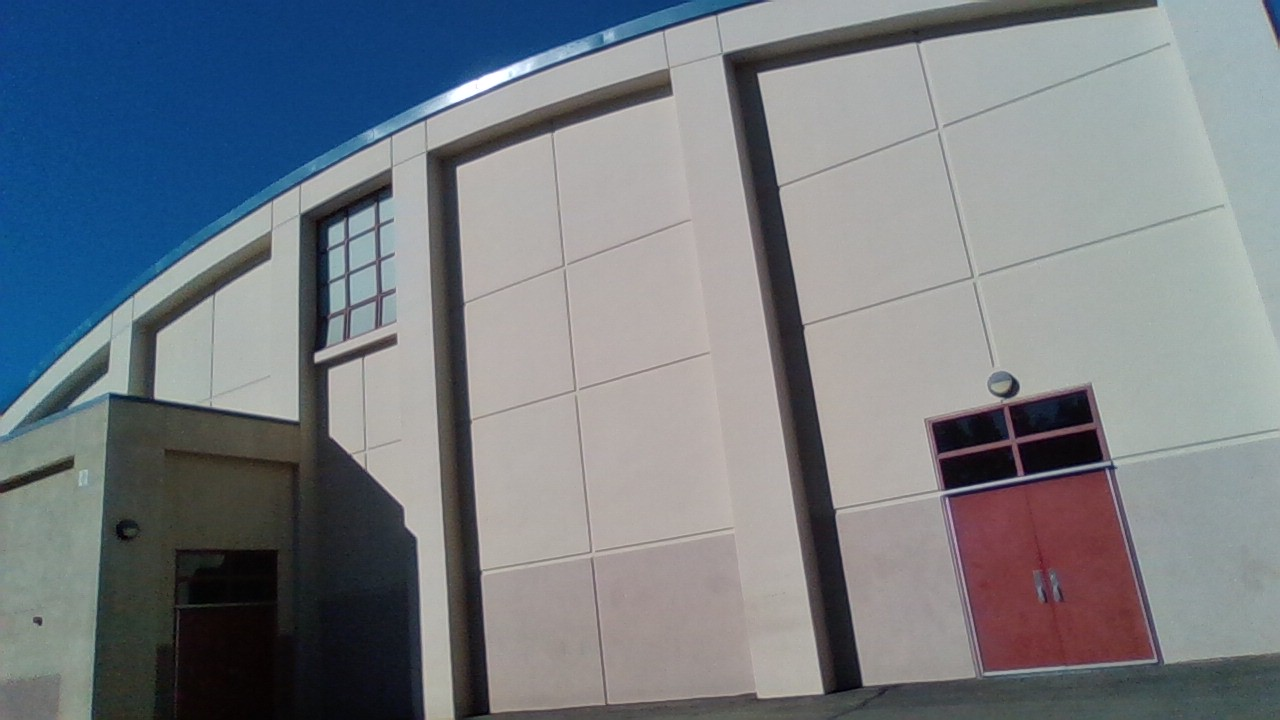
Gymnasium of Diablo Vista Middle School

- Charlotte Wood Middle School
- Diablo Vista Middle School
- Gale Ranch Middle School
- Iron Horse Middle School
- Los Cerros Middle School
- Pine Valley Middle School
- Stone Valley Middle School
- Windemere Ranch Middle School
- Los Meganos Junior High School (1971 to 1973)

=== Elementary schools ===
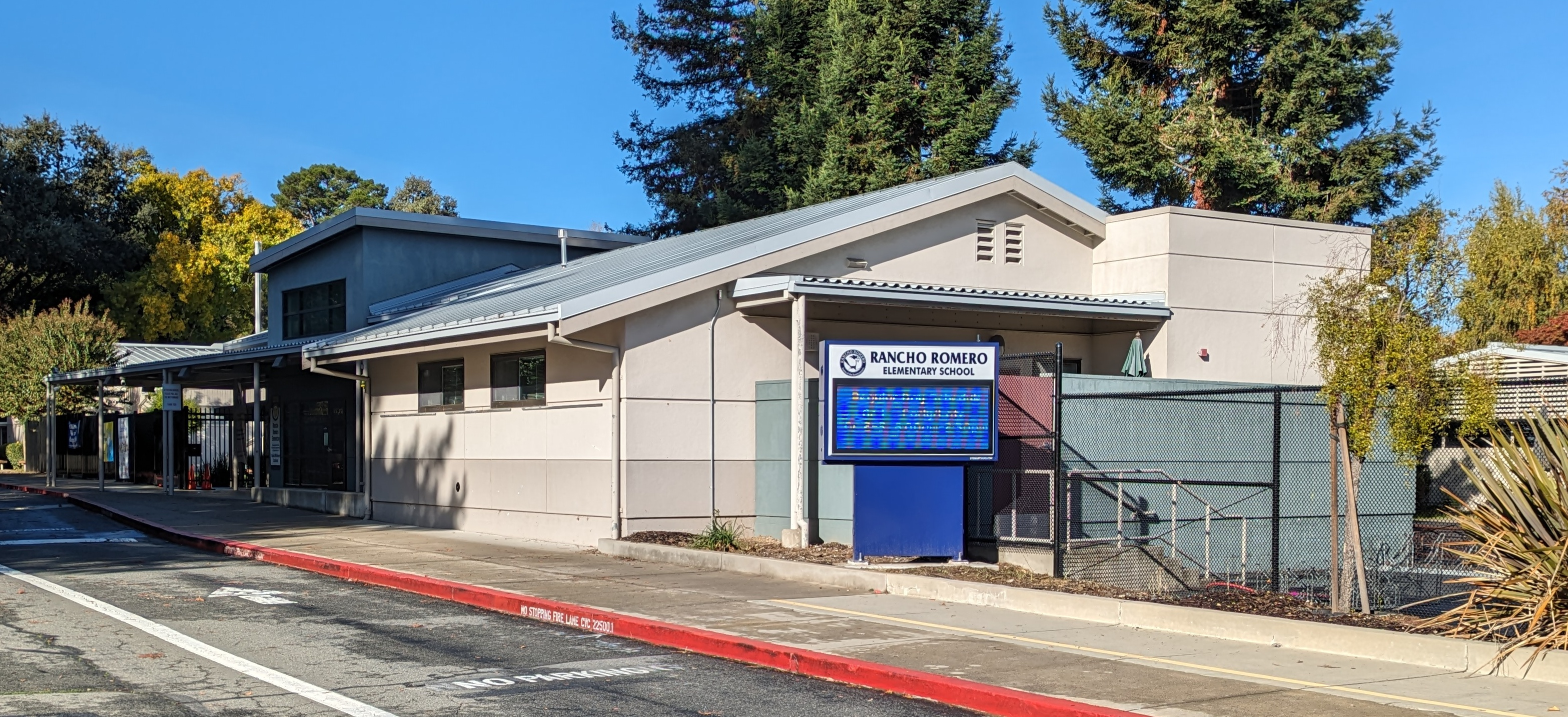
Rancho Romero Elementary School

- Alamo Elementary School
- Bella Vista Elementary School
- Bollinger Elementary School
- Country Club Elementary School
- Coyote Creek Elementary School
- Creekside Elementary School
- Golden View Elementary School
- Green Valley Elementary School
- Greenbrook Elementary School
- Hidden Hills Elementary School
- John Baldwin Elementary School
- Live Oak Elementary School
- Montair Elementary School
- Montevideo Elementary School
- Neil Armstrong Elementary School
- Quail Run Elementary School
- Rancho Romero Elementary School
- Sycamore Valley Elementary School
- Tassajara Hills Elementary School
- Twin Creeks Elementary School
- Vista Grande Elementary School
- Walt Disney Elementary School

=== Alternative schools ===
- Del Amigo Continuation High School
- Venture Independent Study School

== Awards ==
SRVUSD has been named to the annual AP District Honor Roll for eight consecutive years, one of only two school districts to achieve this milestone.

== Transportation ==
The SRVUSD currently operates a fleet with tons of Thomas Saf-T-Liner C2 special needs buses, Thomas Minotour and Blue Bird Micro Bird minibuses, along with several full-size CNG-powered Blue Bird TC/2000 RE and All American A3RE buses. Some SRVUSD schools provide home-to-school transportstion using their minibuses for students with special needs, however some high density schools of the SRVUSD use a service called TRAFFIX to rent some buses from First Student for daily home-to-school transportation, as demand and population are really high in those areas.
