= Thomas Minotour =

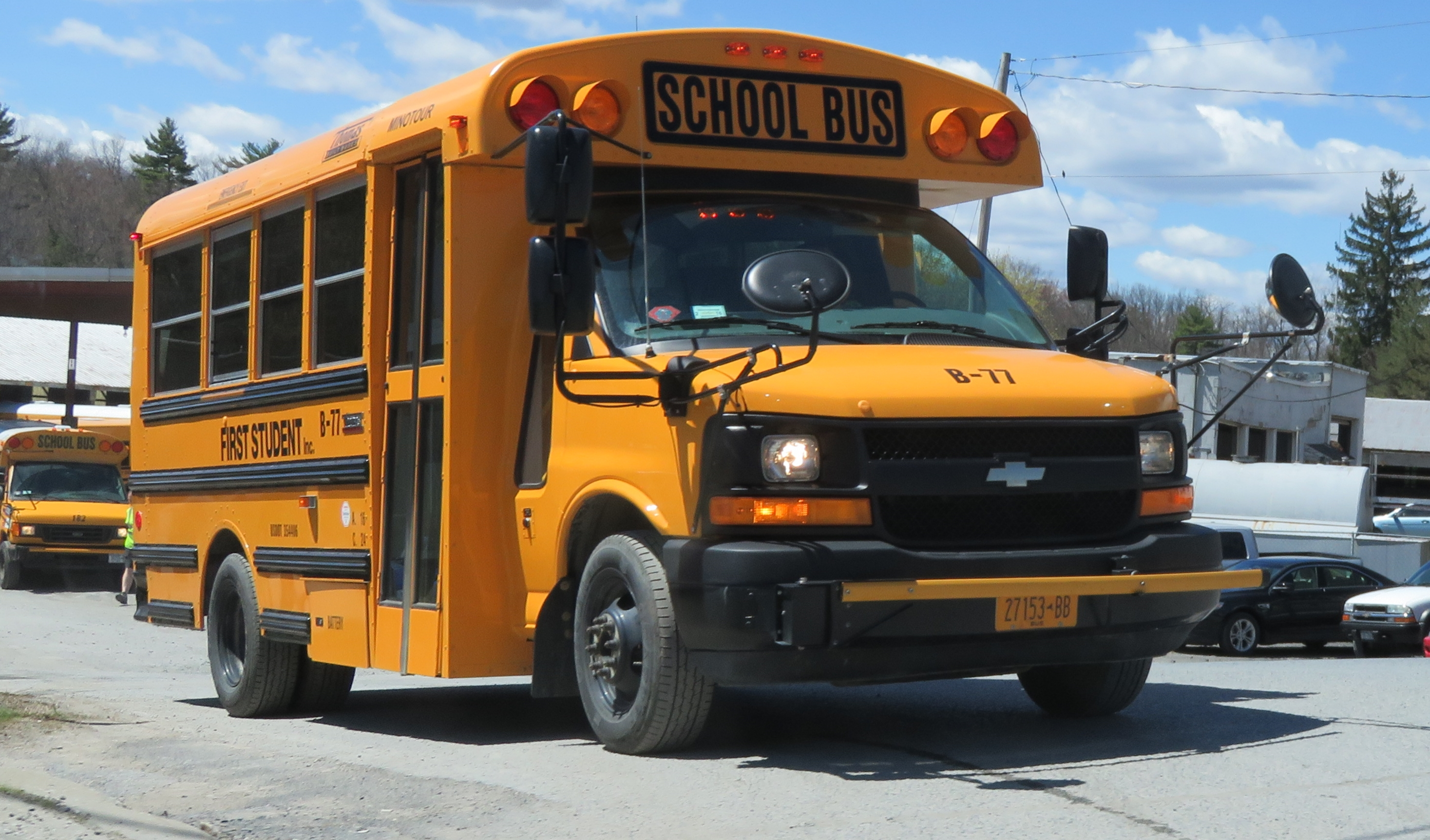

Overview
- Type: Bus
- Manufacturer: Thomas Built Buses
- Also called: Thomas MyBus MFSAB; Thomas MyBus Daycare
- Production: 1980–present
- Assembly: United States: High Point, North Carolina (Thomas High Point Plant)

Body and chassis
- Class: Type A (cutaway van)
- Body style: Cutaway van chassis: School bus; MFSAB (Activity bus)
- Platform: Ford E-Series (1980-present); Ford Transit (coming soon); Chevrolet Van/GMC Vandura (1980-1996); Chevrolet Express/GMC Savana (1997-present)
- Chassis: Cutaway van chassis (see notes)

Dimensions
- Wheelbase: Ford: 138 in (3,505.2 mm); 158 in (4,013.2 mm); General Motors: 139 in (3,530.6 mm); 159 in (4,038.6 mm)

Chronology
- Predecessor: Thomas Mighty Mite

The Thomas Minotour is a bus body manufactured by Thomas Built Buses since 1980. The smallest vehicle sold by the company, the Minotour is a bus body designed for cutaway van chassis. Primarily sold for school bus usage, the Minotour is also produced as a MFSAB (activity bus) or in specialized configurations specified by the customer.

The only current Thomas Built Buses vehicle not to use the Saf-T-Liner nameplate, the Minotour is manufactured alongside the full-size Thomas school bus line in High Point, North Carolina.

== Background ==
In the early 1970s, design of small school buses underwent a period of evolution, shifting from automotive-based vehicles to purpose-built designs. From 1968 to 1971, Ford, Dodge, and General Motors redesigned their van lines, shifting the engine configuration of all three vehicles from behind the front seats to a forward engine placement. Along with far more stable handling characteristics (from a longer wheelbase), the new vans adopted mechanical commonality with light-truck product lines (allowing for increased durability). A new type of commercial vehicle was introduced: the cutaway van chassis. In line with a chassis cab truck, the cutaway van is an incomplete vehicle upfitted by a second stage manufacturer. In the context of school bus manufacturing, cutaway van chassis allowed for school bus bodywork (and its reinforced inner structure) to be adapted to a van chassis, replacing passenger vans or full-size SUVs (such as the Chevrolet Suburban or International Travelall).

In 1973, Wayne Corporation produced the first school bus body for a cutaway van chassis, the Wayne Busette; Blue Bird introduced the Blue Bird Micro Bird in 1975. While not the first cutaway-chassis school bus, the Micro Bird introduced several features that were adapted on virtually all subsequent models; the design included an adult-height entry door, additional glass ahead of the entry door (to aid loading visibility for the driver), and an optional wheelchair lift.

In the 1970s, Thomas Built Buses introduced the Mighty Mite as its first small school bus. Initially produced as a narrow-body version of the Saf-T-Liner Conventional, the Mighty Mite was reintroduced in the mid-1970s as a bus body on Chevrolet P30 stripped chassis (Type B school bus). Produced with relatively few changes, the Mighty Mite was discontinued in 1995.

== Model overview ==
In 1980, the Thomas Minotour was introduced as a supplement to the Mighty Mite. Sharing a similar configuration as the Blue Bird Micro Bird, the Minotour has been offered on both Ford and General Motors cutaway van chassis during its entire production.

=== Body ===
The Minotour body is produced in three different versions: one for single rear-wheel chassis along with standard and extended lengths for dual rear-wheel chassis.

Since its 1980 introduction, the body of the Minotour has seen relatively few changes. During the 1990s, a floor-level rub rail was added. In the early 2000s, the front bodywork above the roof was modified to improve body aerodynamics. In 2008, the taillights were updated (to share a similar design with the Thomas Saf-T-Liner C2 and Thomas Saf-T-Liner HDX). Following various chassis redesigns, the window forward of the entry door has grown in size.

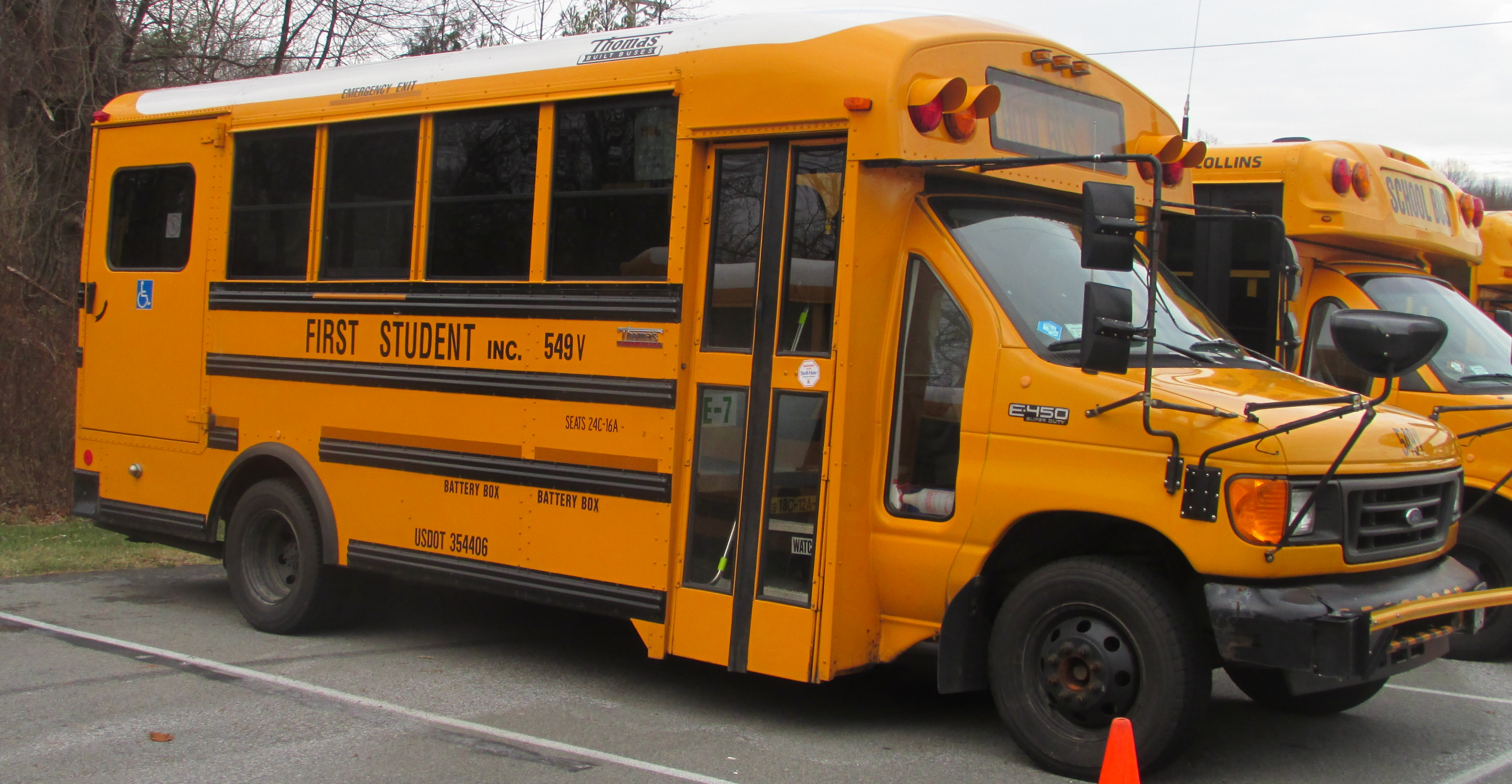
2004-2007 Minotour EL (Ford E450)

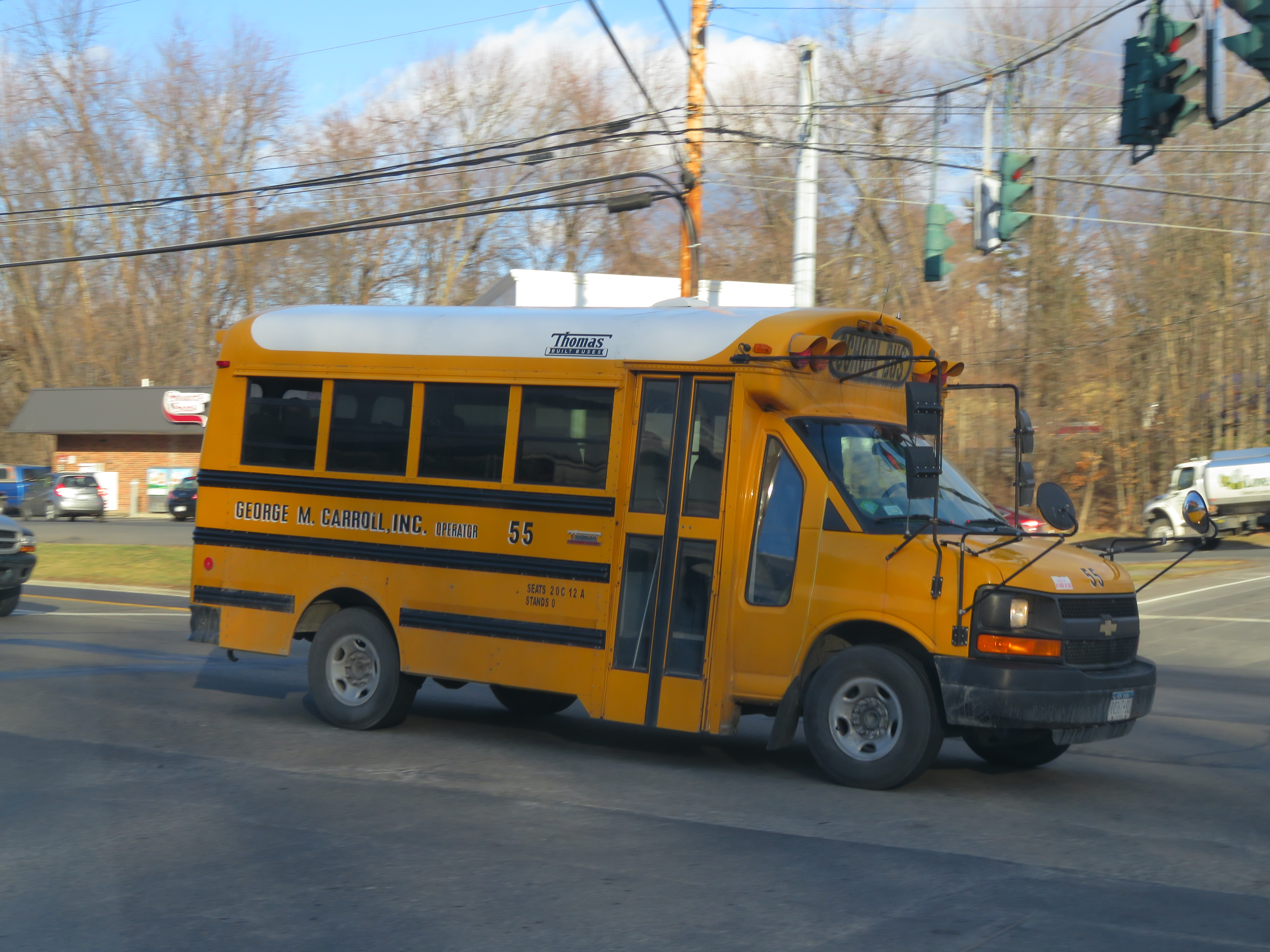
2004-2016 Minotour SRW (Chevrolet Express 3500)

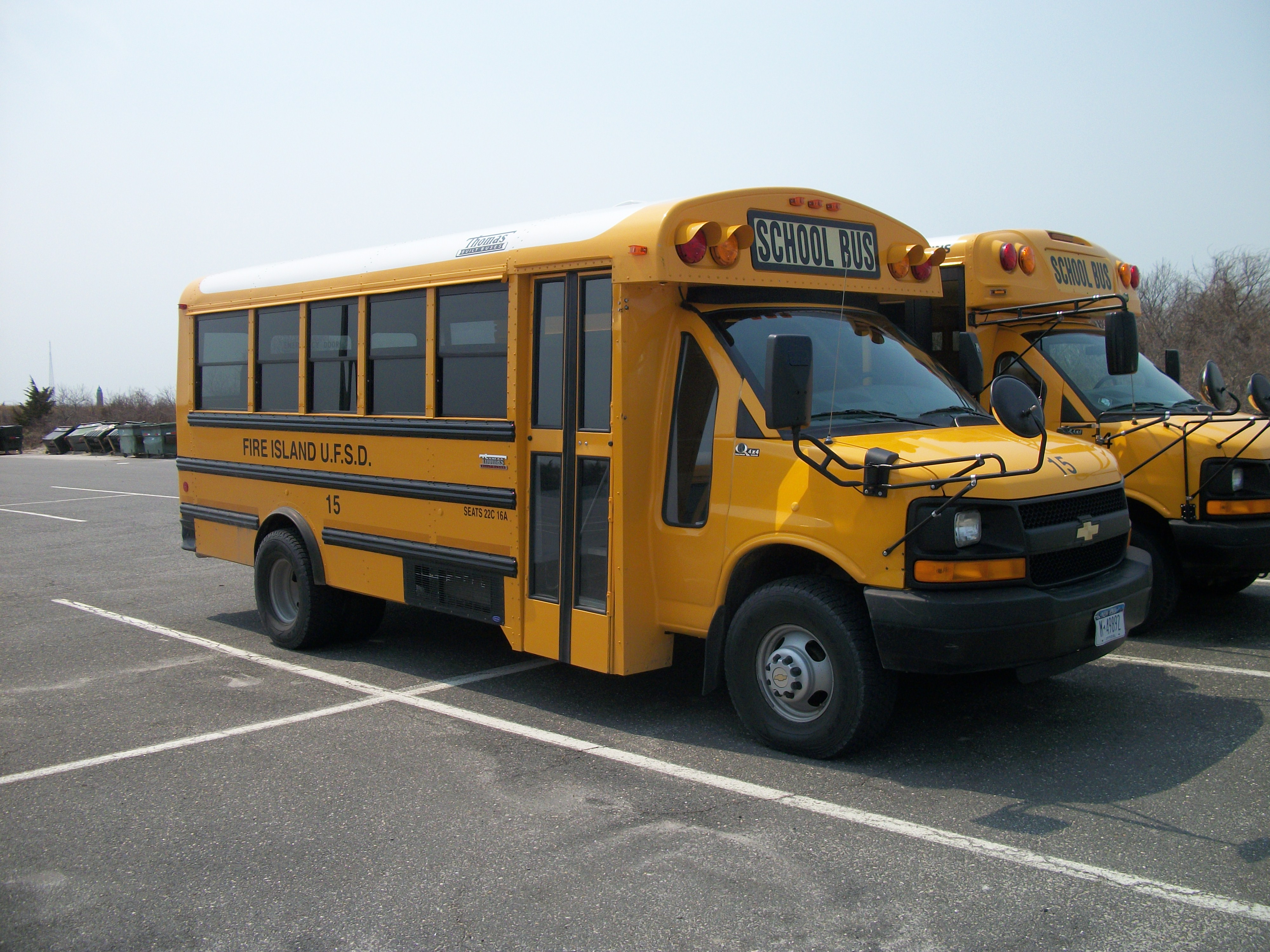
2004-2011 Minotour DRW (Chevrolet Express 4500; 4x4 conversion)

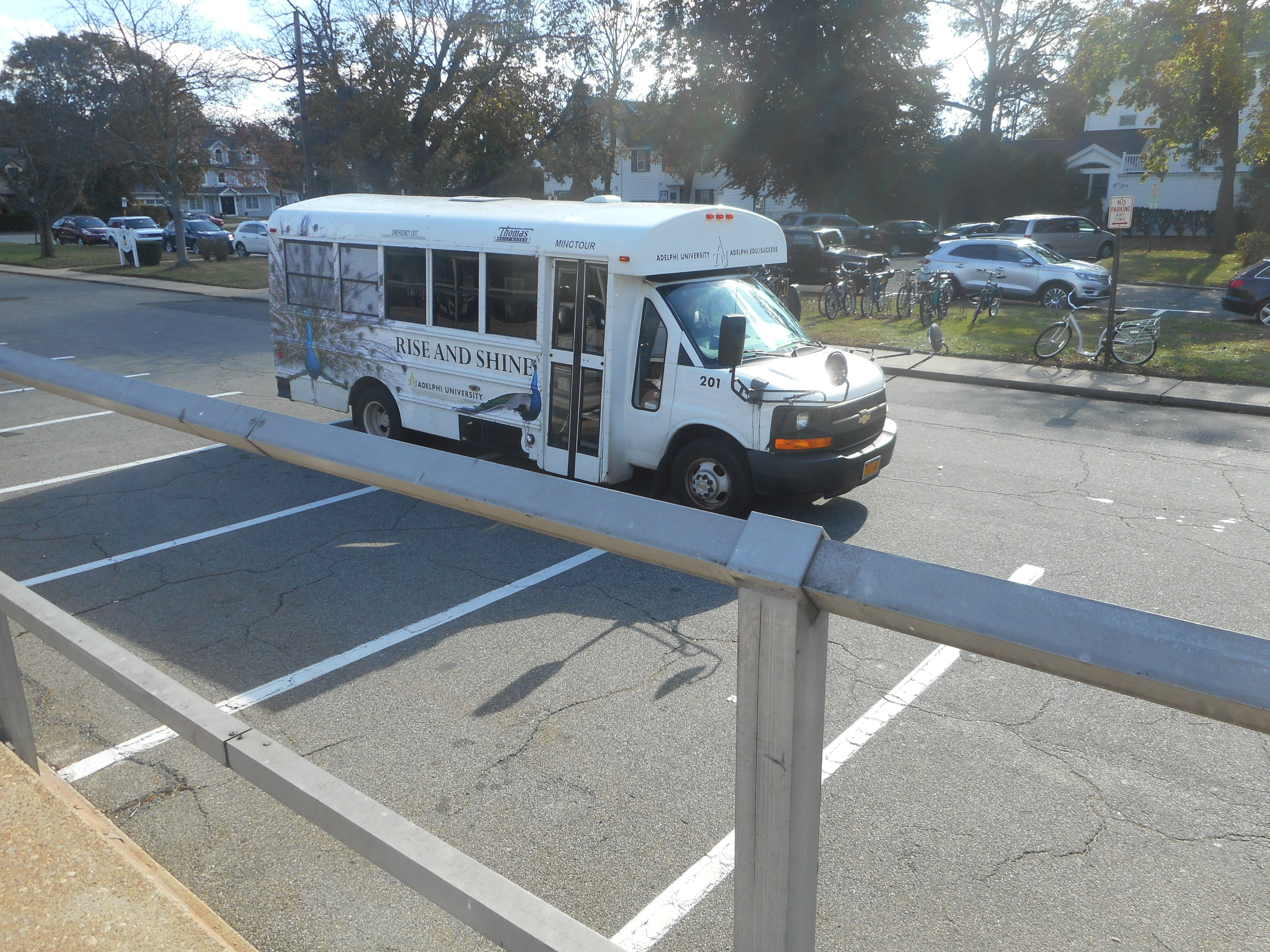
2004-2017 Minotour DRW (Chevrolet Express 4500) in use as activity bus

=== Chassis ===
Introduced on a dual rear-wheel chassis for both Ford and General Motors, the Thomas Minotour became the first cutaway-chassis developed for a single rear-wheel chassis; in the early 1980s, Thomas developed a narrow-body version of the Minotour for a single rear-wheel Ford chassis. Currently, the General Motors chassis is available with two gasoline engines and a diesel engine; the Ford chassis is available with two gasoline engines.

In addition to gasoline and diesel versions of the Minotour, Thomas offers two alternative-fuel versions. On the General Motors chassis, the Minotour can be equipped with the option of CNG (compressed natural gas) or propane-fueled powertrains.

Thomas Minotour Chassis
Chassis	Production	Configuration	Fuel
Ford Econoline 350	1980-1991	Single rear wheel; Dual rear wheel	Gasoline; Diesel
Ford Econoline 350/450	1992–present	Single rear wheel; Dual rear wheel	Gasoline; Diesel
Chevrolet G30/GMC Vandura	1980-1996	Dual rear wheel	Gasoline; Diesel
Chevrolet Express 3500/4500 GMC Savana 3500/4500	1997–present	Single rear wheel; Dual rear wheel	Gasoline; Diesel; Propane/LPG; Compressed Natural Gas (CNG)

Although Thomas Built Buses is owned by Freightliner (itself owned by Daimler AG), the Minotour has not entered production using a Sprinter chassis (under Freightliner or Mercedes-Benz badging; also offered as a Dodge prior to 2011). In addition to the Daimler-produced Sprinter being unable to directly compete with Ford and General Motors counterparts in terms of cost, engineering concerns came into play. In a 2002 mockup of a prototype, Thomas engineers discovered that the heavily reinforced body design of the Minotour far exceeded the GVWR rating for the then-current version of the cutaway-chassis Sprinter.

As of 2020 production, there are no announced plans for a Minotour derived from Ford Transit 350/350HD chassis or from the Ram ProMaster chassis. As of 2021 production, it will be produced on a Ford Transit 350/350HD chassis to join bus production.

== Variants ==
=== MyBus ===
The Thomas MyBus (marketed as MyBus by Thomas Built Buses) is a variant of the Minotour marketed as a MFSAB (Multi-Function School Activity Bus); it is a vehicle intended for entities transporting children (or other individuals) in a group setting, but are not making use of traffic-control devices; these vehicles have been required to take the place of 15-passenger vans due to the risk of rollover in the latter.

Sharing the basic body of the Minotour, the MyBus differs primarily in its more aerodynamic front and rear roof cap styling. In addition, due to its use as an MFSAB, the MyBus is not allowed to be fitted with warning lights, a stop sign, nor can it be painted school bus yellow (conversely, the Minotour is required to be painted that color if it is a school bus).

== See also ==
- Blue Bird Micro Bird
- Wayne Busette
- List of buses
