= Wayne Busette =

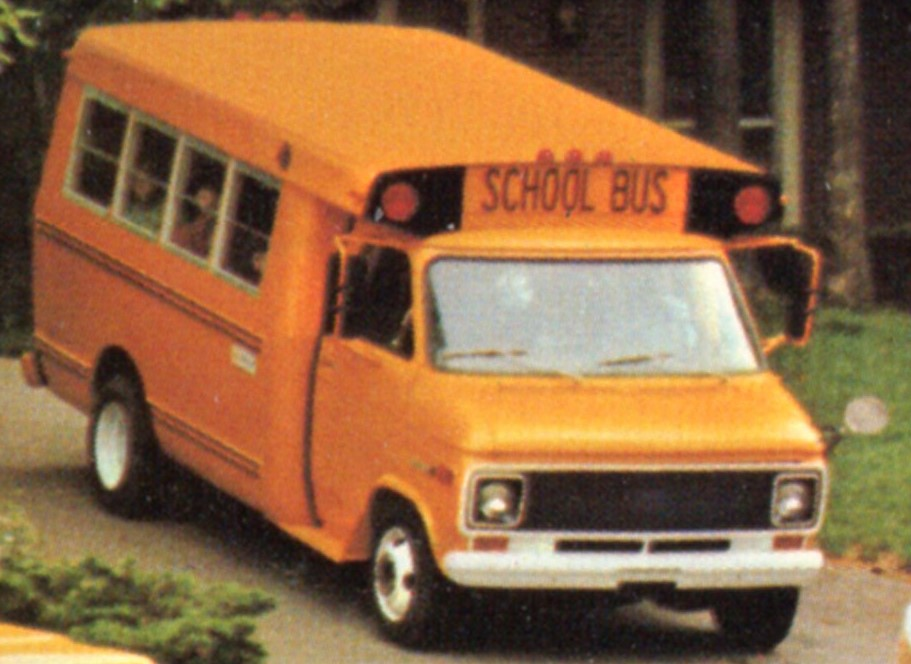
- 1976 Wayne Busette (Chevrolet G-series chassis shown)

Overview
- Manufacturer: Wayne Corporation
- Model years: 1974–1990
- Assembly: Richmond, Indiana; Windsor, Ontario, Canada
- Designer: Wayne Corporation

Body and chassis
- Class: Type A (cutaway van)
- Body style: School bus Shuttle bus
- Layout: Dual rear wheel 4x2
- Platform: Dodge Tradesman/Ram Van; Chevrolet Van/GMC Vandura; Ford Econoline

Powertrain
- Engine: Gasoline; Diesel
- Transmission: Automatic

Chronology
- Successor: Wayne Chaperone/Chaperone II; Mid Bus Guide

The Wayne Busette is a minibus that was assembled by Wayne Corporation from 1974 to 1990. One of the first small buses designed with a purpose-built body, the Busette was marketed primarily as a yellow school bus, but was also developed for multiple commercial applications. In North America, this configuration is now preferred by manufacturers for many types of minibuses (in addition to school buses).

In place of converting a van body for bus use, the model line mated its body to a cutaway van chassis. Through its production, the Busette was produced using dual rear-wheel chassis from Chevrolet, Dodge, Ford, and GMC.

The Busette was assembled by Wayne in its Richmond, Indiana facility, alongside the full-size Wayne Lifeguard and Wayne Lifestar.

== Background ==
From the 1950s to the 1960s, advances in chassis design allowed for school buses to grow in size, with the average conventional-style school bus growing to a seating capacity of 60 passengers. As certain school bus routes remained in need of smaller vehicles, operators sought smaller vehicles. To accommodate this need, some manufacturers began conversions of passenger vehicles, including the Chevrolet/GMC Suburban and International Harvester Travelall. As domestic manufacturers began production of passenger vans, Ford, General Motors, and Dodge vans were converted into small school buses. While painted school bus yellow alongside a full-size school bus, converted school buses saw few changes from those sold to retail customers.

In 1971, Chrysler introduced the Maxiwagon variant of the Dodge Sportsman and Plymouth Voyager, becoming the first 15-passenger vans sold commercially in North America. Following the introduction of the Maxiwagon, Ford and General Motors would eventually introduce their own 15-passenger vans.

=== Cutaway van chassis ===
From 1971 to 1975, all three American major automotive manufacturers ("Big Three") would completely redesign their full-size van product lines, introducing heavier-duty chassis and higher payload capacity, with all three designs moving the engine forward of the driver. The latter move drew the interest of recreational vehicle and delivery truck manufacturers, leading to a new derivative of full-size vans, the cutaway van chassis.

Intended for commercial use, the cutaway van chassis is designed similar to a chassis cab truck. With all bodywork ending behind the front seats, a cutaway van chassis is shipped to a second stage manufacturer to be completed with its final bodywork, such as a bus or truck body, motorhome, or other specialized vehicle. The van chassis drew the "cutaway" name from the missing rear bodywork, usually covered by temporary plywood or heavy cardboard material for shipment.

Until they are mated together, neither the second-stage portion (rear bodywork) nor the first-stage portion (called an incomplete motor vehicle) are fully compliant with requirements for a complete motor vehicle. Neither portion can be licensed or operated lawfully without the other.

== Design overview ==
In the early 1970s, Wayne Corporation began experimenting with prototype school bus bodies on cutaway chassis. Using a Ford Econoline 300 chassis, Wayne produced a prototype named "Busette". Similar to its GM-based Papoose, the Busette was built on a dual rear-wheel chassis, as Wayne sought to increase stability over standard passenger vehicles. The use of cutaway van chassis would also allow for easier servicing; a van-based bus could be serviced at many automobile dealers, an advantage over buses based on medium-duty trucks.

Using a cutaway chassis cab, the Busette was fitted with a purpose-built school bus body, allowing for expanded seating capacity, with a rated seating capacity of 24. The use of a purpose-built body allowed for the fitment of school bus windows and a rear emergency exit. To keep weight down, Wayne designed the Busette with 63″ of headroom (approximately 10″ lower than a full-size school bus roofline), which limited standing room for older students and adults. Initially, curbside entry was provided through a makeshift arrangement using the original-equipment van door. After the 1976 introduction of the Transette, a conventional bus door and stepwell became an option.

The initial Ford Econoline prototype was well received by potential customers, leading the company to mass-produce the Busette. The first examples were produced in 1973 on Dodge Tradesman chassis, with Wayne introducing Chevrolet G30/GMC Vandura chassis for 1974. Due to differences in cutaway floor construction of Dodge, Ford, and GM van chassis, Ford production of the Busette was deferred until 1981.

The Busette proved to be a very popular Wayne product. School bus versions were widely accepted by Head Start and special education programs. In comparison to vans and other small buses, the Busette's dual rear-wheel design was favorable to single rear wheels due to its greater stability. The Busette's low overall height made it seem smaller to drivers transitioning from passenger vans to larger buses.

Wayne Busette/Transette chassis manufacturers
Chassis	Production	Notes
Chevrolet G30/GMC Vandura	1974-1990	
Dodge Tradesman B300	1973-c.1978	
Ford Econoline 300	1972	Prototype
Ford Econoline 350	1981-1990	

== Design variants ==
=== Wayne Transette ===
In 1975, a higher headroom version for adult transportation was developed called Transette. Wayne modified the Busette to increase its headroom and include a bus-style walk-in door. Since the Transette was not bound by school bus safety standards, Wayne also added features like larger side windows, standee windows, and non-school bus seats. Also, an auxiliary air conditioning unit was made available as an option.

The Transette prototype was introduced to the dealer organization in the fall of 1975 at the annual Wayne dealer sales meeting, held that year at Richmond, Indiana. Dealers were very enthusiastic about the new Transette product. In early 1976, the prototype was introduced on a nationwide tour and orders began rolling in. One market for which the Transette proved well-suited for was airport car rental shuttles. Within a year, Wayne Transette minibuses became the primary small shuttle vehicle for all the major rental car companies: Hertz, Avis, National, Budget, and Dollar rent-a-car organizations each had purchased a number of Transettes for use at or near most of their US airport locations.

=== Wayne Chaperone ===
As Wayne produced the Busette during the 1970s, many manufacturers developed similar products of their own. During the mid-1980s, to increase its market share, Wayne introduced a second Type A product: the Chaperone. The Chaperone featured much of the same layout of the Busette, with the same dual rear wheel chassis available. However, instead of three rubrails on the side panels, the Chaperone featured four; the body was essentially the same design used for the Lifeguard built to fit a van chassis. The Chaperone was produced by Wayne Corporation and by Wayne Wheeled Vehicles until its closure.

== Legacy ==
By the mid-1980s, the five largest school bus body manufacturers in the United States would develop cutaway chassis school buses of their own, with the Blue Bird Micro Bird and Thomas Minotour becoming among the most popular. These manufacturers were also joined by several more that specialized exclusively in production of cutaway chassis school buses, including Collins, Mid Bus, US Bus, and Van Con.

After the 1990 discontinuation of the Busette, Wayne Corporation sold the tooling and product rights to Mid Bus, an Ohio manufacturer of small school buses formed from the closure of Superior Coach.

Busette and Transette minibuses both offered optional wheelchair ramps and electro-hydraulic lifts which had been developed by accessibility product pioneers Don Collins, a former Wayne dealer and founder of Collins Bus Corporation (which grew into a major manufacturer specializing in small buses), and Ralph Braun, a disabled man who started Braun Industries with products developed in his garage. The Transette became especially popular in small town transit and dial-a-ride paratransit-type services in the US.
