= Girardin Minibus =

Canadian manufacturer

- Industry: Bus manufacturing
- Founded: 1935; 91 years ago
- Founder: Lionel Girardin
- Headquarters: 3000 Girardin; Drummondville, Quebec J2E 0A1, Canada
- Area served: North America
- Products: Short buses
- Brands: Micro Bird
- Services: Bus sales (Blue Bird)
- Divisions: Micro Bird, Inc (joint venture with Blue Bird)
- Website: www.girardinbluebird.com www.microbird.com

Girardin Minibus Inc. is a Canadian short bus manufacturer. Based in Drummondville, Quebec, Canada, Girardin forms part of the Micro Bird joint venture with Blue Bird Corporation. As part of Micro Bird, Girardin is a manufacturer of cutaway van chassis-based minibuses.

While many Micro Bird buses are produced as school buses and related student transport vehicles, Girardin also produces commercial-use buses using cutaway van chassis. In Canada, the company serves as the nationwide distributor of the Blue Bird school bus and commercial bus product line.

Following the 2008 closure of Corbeil, Girardin was the lone Canadian-based manufacturer of school buses until the 2011 opening of Autobus Lion (now Compagnie Électrique Lion).

== History ==
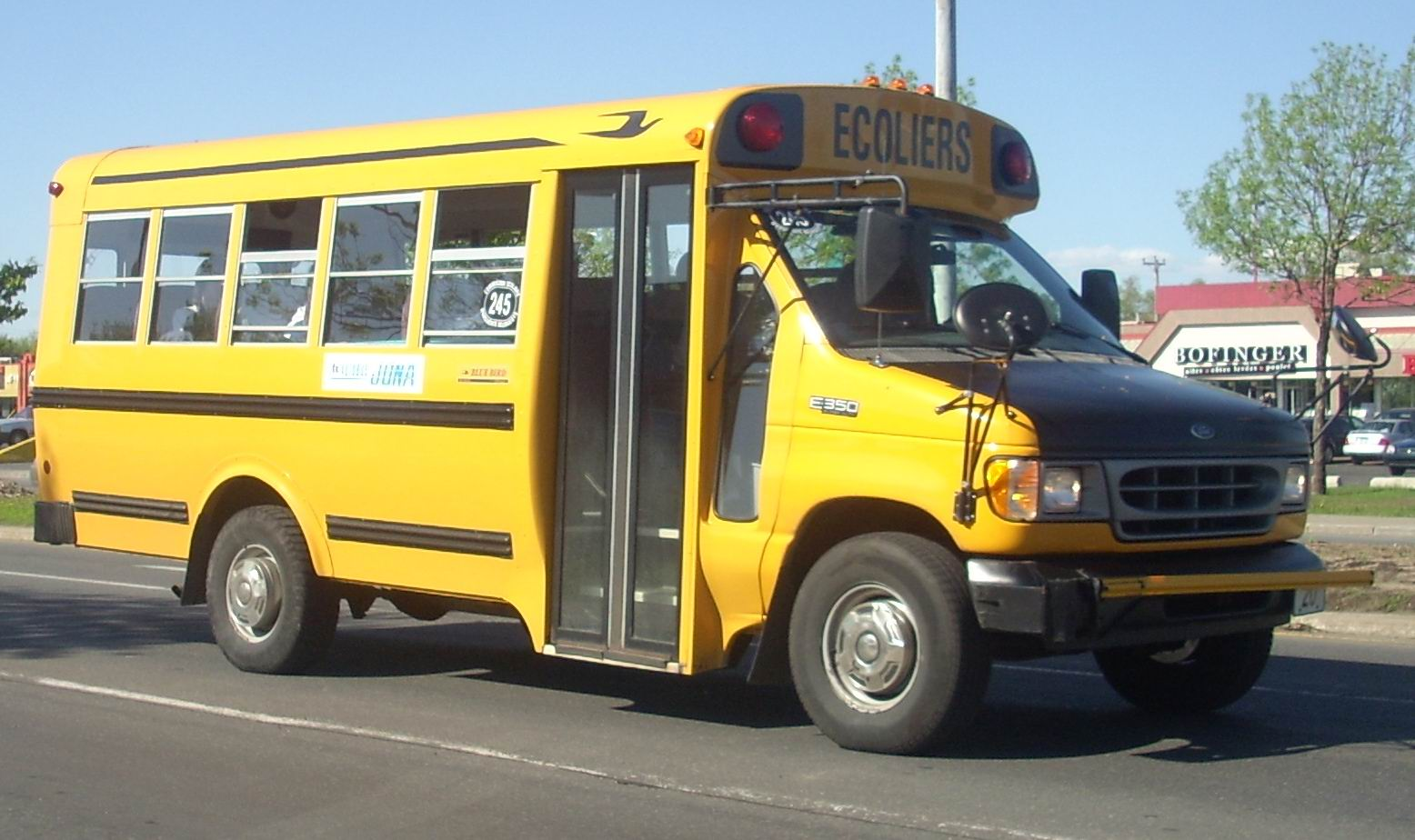
Blue Bird by Girardin MB-II

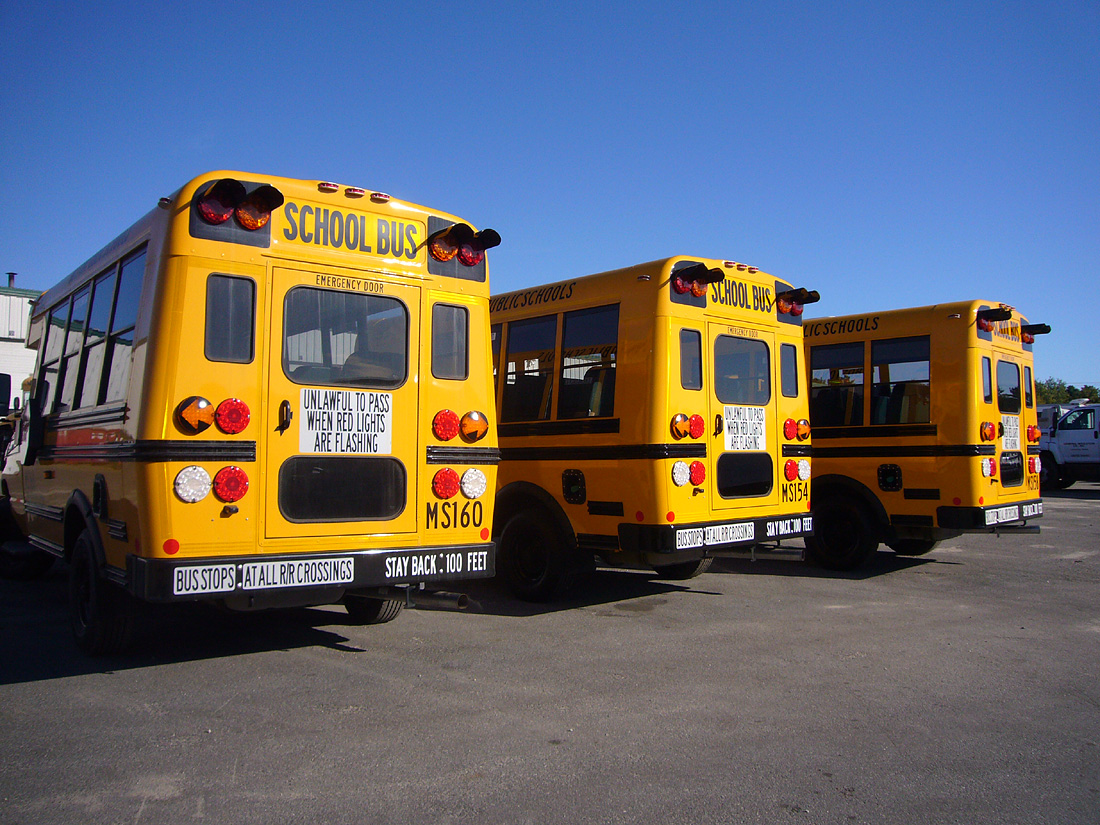
Girardin MB-II, rear view

Girardin traces its roots to 1935, when company founder Lionel Girardin opened a used-car dealership and repair shop in St-Félix-de-Kingsey, Quebec. He expanded into new-car sales in 1953 by opening a Chrysler dealership. In 1958, Girardin entered the school bus market by becoming a school bus dealership.

In 1965, Girardin opened a bus dealership in Drummondville, Quebec; along with bus sales, Girardin converted vans into minibuses (some of the first Type A school buses). In 1981, a dedicated factory was built to keep up with demand; the factory was expanded in 1991 and again in 2000.

In 1991, Girardin Minibus introduced the MB-II and MB-IV school buses; from 1992 to 1999, these were distributed throughout North America using the Blue Bird by Girardin name. In 1999, a tornado hit the 1991 factory. In 2006, the MB-IV was replaced with the G5, a redesigned dual rear-wheel Type A school bus.

In 2009, Blue Bird Corporation entered into a joint venture with Girardin to produce Type A school buses. Under the terms of the joint venture, Blue Bird's Micro Bird (in production since 1975) was phased out and replaced by Girardin-designed products built in Drummondville.

== Joint ventures ==
Girardin Minibus has twice entered into partnerships with a larger bus manufacturer; both have been with American manufacturer Blue Bird Corporation.

=== Blue Bird MB-II/MB-IV by Girardin (1992–1999) ===
From 1992 to 1999, Girardin and Blue Bird were in a partnership to sell the MB-II and MB-IV Type A school buses in North America. At the time, Girardin was little known outside of Quebec and Blue Bird's own Micro Bird was not available in the single rear-wheel configuration that the MB-II offered. After 1999, Girardin chose to market the MB school buses under its own brand name.

=== Micro Bird, Inc. (2009–present) ===
In October 2009, Girardin re-entered into a joint venture with Blue Bird. This partnership, named Micro Bird, Inc, resulted in the Micro Bird model being discontinued, as Type A school bus construction was transferred from Blue Bird's Georgia facility to Girardin's Drummondville facility. Type A school buses built by Girardin are now branded as Blue Bird Micro Bird by Girardin.

The first bus manufacturer in North America to develop a body for the Ford Transit cutaway cab chassis, Micro Bird introduced the T-Series model line in 2015, slotted between the MB-II and G5. While the Transit replaced the E-series as a passenger van, the T-Series marked the introduction of a third model line, produced with a choice of axle configurations on a single body for the first time.

In 2026, Blue Bird purchased the remaining controlling stake in Micro Bird to wholly own the company.

== Models ==
Girardin/Micro Bird Product lineup
Model Name	G5 (Micro Bird DRW)	MB-II (Micro Bird SRW)	T-Series (Micro Bird Transit)	MB-IV
Image				
Body Configuration	Dual rear wheels	Single rear wheels	Single rear wheels; Dual rear wheels	Dual rear wheels
Production	2006–present	1991–present (see notes)	2015–present	1991-2005
Versions	School Bus; Commercial Bus; Multi-Function School Activity Bus (MFSAB)			School Bus; Commercial Bus
Chassis Supplier	Chevrolet Express/GMC Savana; Ford E-350/E-450 Super Duty	Chevrolet Express/GMC Savana; Chevrolet G30/GMC Vandura 3500; Ford E-350/E-450 Super Duty; Ford Econoline 350	Ford Transit 350/350 HD	Chevrolet Express/GMC Savana; Chevrolet G30/GMC Vandura 3500; Ford E-350/E-450 Super Duty; Ford Econoline 350
Maximum Seating Capacity	30 (school bus); 25 (commercial bus)	20 (school bus); 12 (commercial bus); 14 (MFSAB)	25 (school bus/MFSAB)	
Notes	Introduced in 2005 and produced since 2006, replacing MB-IV as DRW product line; Replaced Blue Bird Micro Bird under Micro Bird joint venture; An electric version of Micro Bird G5 Built on ford E450 chassis set to commerce production for 2019.	Introduced in 1991 as first single rear-wheel bus to use a cutaway body; produced with aluminum body panels; Distributed in the United States by Blue Bird from 1992 to 1999 (Girardin from 1999 to 2009)	Produced since 2015, first bus produced on Ford Transit chassis in North America; Derived from MB-II body (rebodied to fit Ford Transit chassis)	Introduced in 1991 as dual rear-wheel version of MB-II; Sold by Blue Bird alongside Blue Bird Micro Bird from 1992 to 1999; Replaced by Girardin G5 for 2006

== See also ==
- Blue Bird Corporation - distributor of Girardin products in United States; Girardin is distributor of Blue Birds in Canada.
- Cutaway van chassis
- Les Enterprises Michel Corbeil - former Canadian competing manufacturer of small school buses
