= Blue Bird Micro Bird =

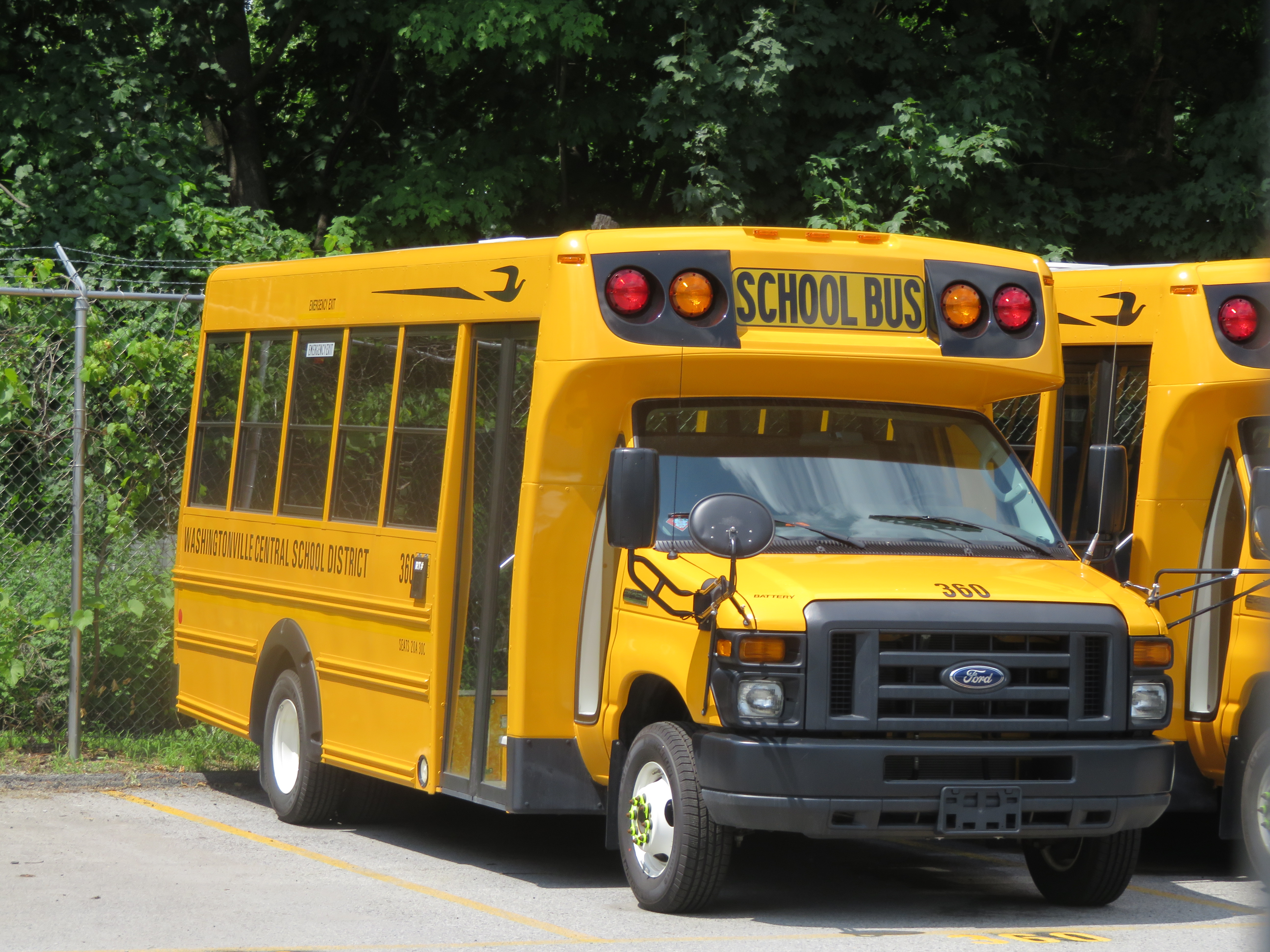
- Mid-2010s Blue Bird Micro Bird G5 (Ford E450 chassis)

Overview
- Manufacturer: Blue Bird Body Company (1975–1992); Blue Bird Corporation (1992–2010, 2026–present); Micro Bird, Inc. (Blue Bird/Girardin joint venture) (2010–2026)
- Production: 1975–present
- Assembly: see listing

Body and chassis
- Body style: School bus/MFSAB; Mini bus
- Platform: see listing

The Blue Bird Micro Bird is a bus body produced in the United States and Canada by Blue Bird Corporation. First introduced in 1975, the Micro Bird body is combined with a cutaway van chassis, with passenger capacity ranging from 10 to 30 passengers. While most examples are produced as a school bus, the Micro Bird has been sold in various configurations, including commercial-use minibuses and as a MFSAB (Multi-Function School Activity Buses). MFSABs are alternatives to 15-passenger vans; examples have come into use by child care centers and other organizations (including school systems) due to updated safety regulations.

From 2010 to 2026, the Blue Bird Micro Bird has been produced as part of a joint venture with Blue Bird and Girardin Minibus, called Micro Bird, Inc. Final assembly currently takes place at the Girardin facilities in Drummondville, Quebec, Canada and Plattsburgh, New York. In early 2026, Blue Bird entered an agreement to fully acquire Micro Bird for $200 million.

== Background ==
During the 1960s and early 1970s, small school buses in the United States and Canada were heavily derived from production vehicles. Along with full-size vans such as the Dodge A100, the Chevrolet ChevyVan/GMC Handi-Van, and the Ford Econoline, large "carryall" SUVs were also used (such as the Chevrolet Suburban/GMC Carryall and International Travelall). To increase the safety of small vehicles transporting students, bus manufacturers chose to design a bus body that mated a production vehicle chassis with a body designed with the same reinforced internal structure of a large school bus.

In 1973, Wayne Corporation introduced the Wayne Busette, the first school bus to successfully use a cutaway van chassis with a school bus body. To increase its stability over a van or an SUV, the Busette chassis (the Chevrolet/GMC G30) utilized a dual rear-wheel axle.

In 1975, Blue Bird developed the Micro Bird as a response to the Busette. To further evolve the design, the Micro Bird increased the design commonality between small buses their full-size counterparts. The Micro Bird design would inspire similar designs, including the Thomas Minotour, the Collins Bantam series, and the Wayne Chaperone.

At its launch, the intended markets for the Micro Bird were districts transporting small children or special needs students (the Micro Bird would become popular with the "Handy Bus" option, fitted with a wheelchair lift).

In 2009, Blue Bird and Girardin Minibus entered into a joint venture (Micro Bird, Inc.), transferring responsibility of small bus production to the latter company in Canada, with all vehicles sold under the Blue Bird name. Alongside yellow school buses, Micro Bird markets commercial mini buses. In 2025, Micro Bird opened a facility in Plattsburgh, New York to expand production.

In early 2026, Blue Bird entered an agreement to acquire full ownership of the Micro Bird joint venture; in exchange for nearly $200 million in cash and 2.7 million shares of Blue Bird company stock, the company acquired Girardin Minibus's share of the joint venture, completing it in April 2026. The leadership structure of Micro Bird and vehicle assembly currently remain unchanged.

== First generation (1975–2010) ==
First generation (Micro Bird)
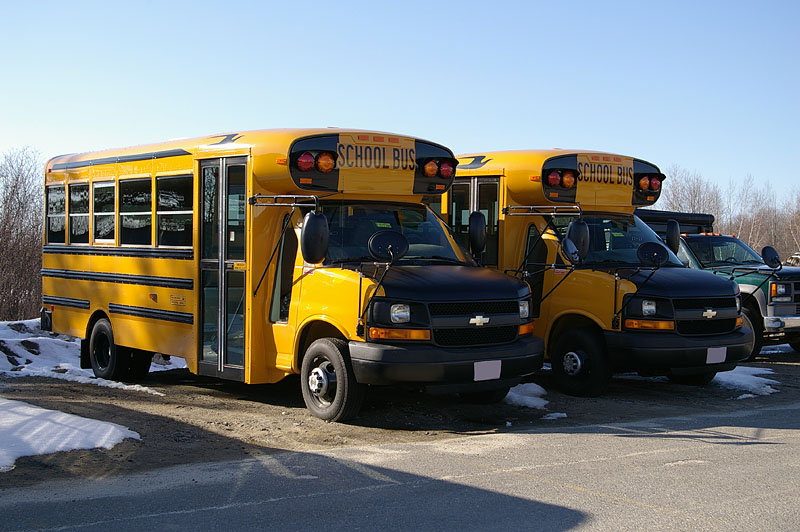
- Late 2000s Micro Bird DRW (Chevrolet Express 3500 chassis)

Overview
- Manufacturer: Blue Bird
- Also called: Micro Bird SRW; Micro Bird DRW
- Model years: 1975-2010

Body and chassis
- Class: Type A (cutaway van chassis)
- Layout: single rear wheel axle; dual rear wheel axle
- Platform: Ford Econoline 350; Ford E-350/E-450; Chevrolet G30/GMC Vandura 3500; Chevrolet Express/GMC Savana 3500/4500
- Chassis: Cutaway van chassis

In 1975, Blue Bird introduced the Micro Bird, its first product line designed to utilize a cutaway van chassis. Developed in response to the Wayne Busette, the Micro Bird introduced several new features to small bus design. In place of adapting the stock van door for loading and unloading, Blue Bird extended the bus body (on the curbside) all the way to the windshield, allowing for the creation of an entry matching the design of its full-size Conventional and All American buses (with two steps instead of three). Ahead of the entry door, Blue Bird added two windows (the stock vent window and a secondary one below it) to aid visibility for loading and unloading passengers; in various forms, this feature has been copied by nearly all types of cutaway-chassis buses ever since. While the Busette was designed with its own body from the ground up, Blue Bird adapted the body design of the Micro Bird from its full-size lines; to properly fit the van chassis, the body was narrowed in width and reduced in height.

Alongside its production on a Chevrolet/GMC dual rear-wheel chassis, the initial Micro Bird was also manufactured using a Ford Econoline 350 chassis. As a wheelchair lift was added as option, it became the designated as the "Handy Bus" sub-model.

=== Model changes ===
During the mid-1980s, Blue Bird made a visible change to the Micro Bird exterior design. To aid driver visibility, the two-piece loading-zone window was replaced with a larger single-piece window, leading for the passenger-side door to be removed (in its entirety) and replaced by a metal window frame.

The largest changes to the Micro Bird body came in the mid 1990s, coinciding with the introduction of the Chevrolet Express/GMC Savana for 1997 production. Alongside modifications necessitated to accommodate the new chassis design, Blue Bird widened the body slightly and gave it a higher (flatter) roofline (increasing interior headroom). In the interest of aerodynamics, the front and rear roofcaps were replaced by re-profiled fiberglass versions (extending over the windshield). In a change adopted from its MB-series buses, the Micro Bird switched from steel to aluminum body construction. On its Ford dual rear-wheel buses, a full-length flat floor became standard.

After Blue Bird ended its distribution agreement with Girardin in 1999, Blue Bird commenced development of its own body for a single rear-wheel cutaway chassis. Making its debut in 2001, the Micro Bird SW (single rear wheel) was produced in two variants: a lower-roofline body (similar to the MB-II, and largely intended as a MFSAB) and a version with a roofline nearly matching the dual rear-wheel Micro Bird in height. Later in the 2000s, the fiberglass roofcap of the body saw a second redesign.

Following the establishment of the Micro Bird joint venture with Girardin in late 2009, Blue Bird ended production of the first-generation Micro Bird at the end of the 2010 model year. At 35 years of production, the Micro Bird is the longest-produced model design by the company (outliving the 1957-1989 All American by three years). The 2010 Micro Bird is also the final Blue Bird model line to have its chassis production outsourced to another manufacturer.

== Second generation (MB series; 1992–1999; 2010–present) ==
Second generation (MB-series)
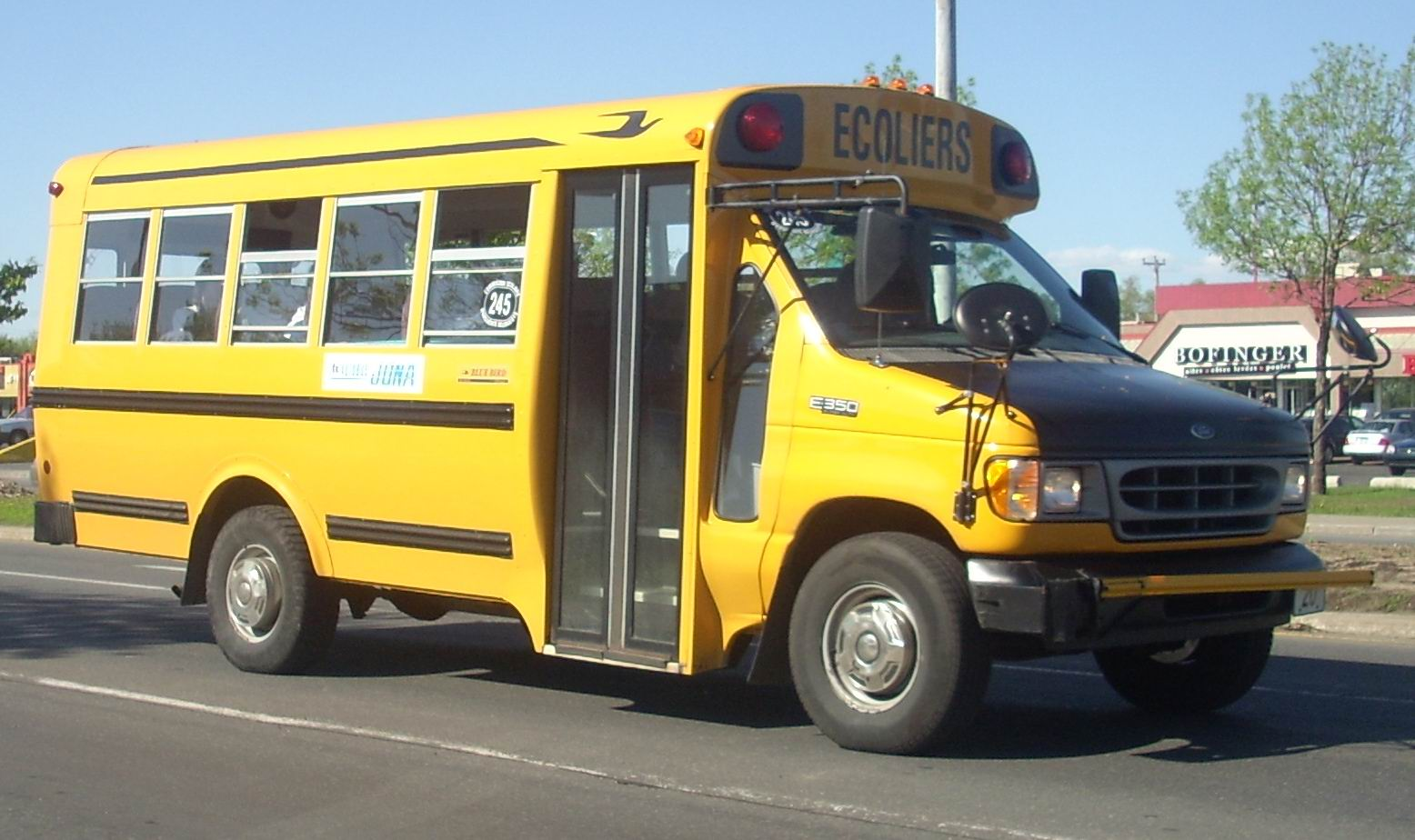
- 1997-1999 Blue Bird by Girardin MB-II (Ford E-350 chassis)

Overview
- Manufacturer: Girardin Minibus
- Model code: MB-II (SRW); MB-IV (DRW)
- Model years: 1992-1999 (MB-II, MB-IV); 2010-present (MB-II)
- Assembly: Canada: Drummondville, Quebec (Girardin Minibus)

Body and chassis
- Class: Type A (cutaway van chassis)
- Layout: single rear wheel axle; dual rear wheel axle
- Platform: Ford E-350; Chevrolet G30/GMC Vandura 3500; Chevrolet Express/GMC Savana 3500
- Chassis: Cutaway van chassis

Chronology
- Successor: Micro Bird G5 (for MB-IV); Micro Bird T-Series (for MB-II Ford E-Series)

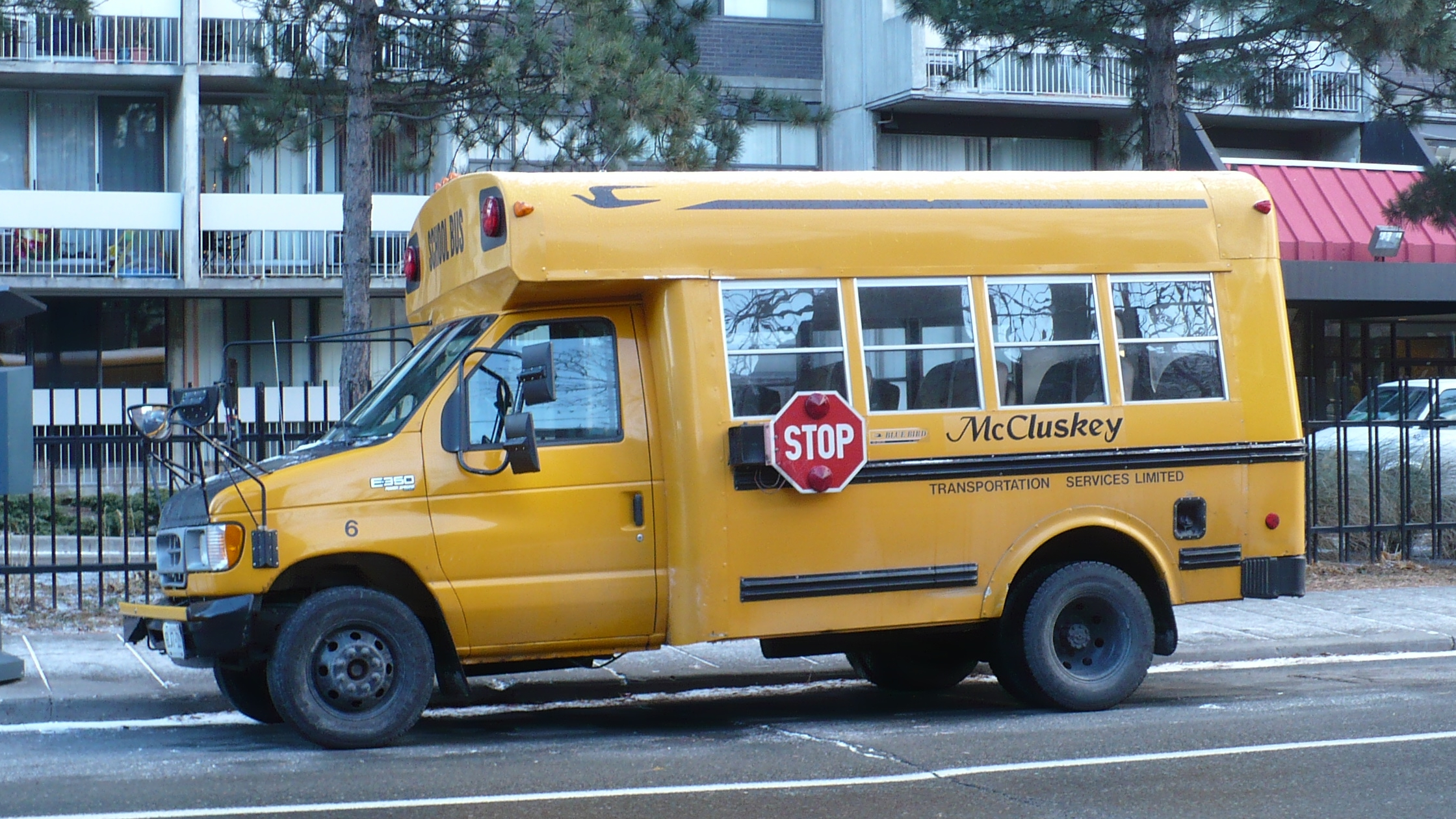
Blue Bird MB-IV by Girardin (1997-1999 Ford E350 Super Duty DRW)

2010s Blue Bird Micro Bird MB-II (Ford E350 SRW chassis)

Blue Bird and Quebec-based manufacturer Girardin Minibus have produced cutaway school bus bodies in two separate joint ventures. From 1992 to 1999, the companies organized a distribution agreement, with Blue Bird selling Girardin-produced buses in its sales network. At the time, the latter company served as the Blue Bird distributor for most of eastern Canada (an arrangement that currently remains in place).

In 2009, Girardin entered into a second joint venture with Blue Bird, named Micro Bird, Inc. Under the agreement, Blue Bird transferred responsibility of small bus production to the Girardin facilities in Quebec as it concentrated on the design and production of full-size buses.

=== 1992-1999 (Blue Bird MB by Girardin) ===
In 1992, Blue Bird introduced Girardin-produced buses to the United States, marketing them as "Blue Bird MBII/IV by Girardin". Introduced in 1991, the MB-series was an all-new design, with the MB-II offering Blue Bird its first single rear-wheel Type A bus. Breaking from established design precedents, the MB-II was not a conversion of a passenger van, but used a cutaway cab body (in line with dual rear wheel chassis); in another departure, the MB series was constructed with aluminum body panels (in place of steel). The MB-II was offered with two different door configurations: a standard bus door (standard on Ford-chassis buses) and a van-style door (standard on Chevrolet/GMC G-van prior to 1997).

Configured similar to the Micro Bird, the MB-IV was also assembled with aluminum body panels.

=== 2009-present (Micro Bird, Inc) ===
Following the launch of Micro Bird, Inc., the MB-II adopted its Blue Bird branding again, replacing the single rear-wheel Micro Bird introduced in 2001. The body was redesigned slightly, including an option for a taller roofline and windows (matching the MB-IV in height).

The MB-II currently remains in production, with most updates tied toward its chassis production.

== Third generation (G5; 2010–present) ==
Third generation (G5)
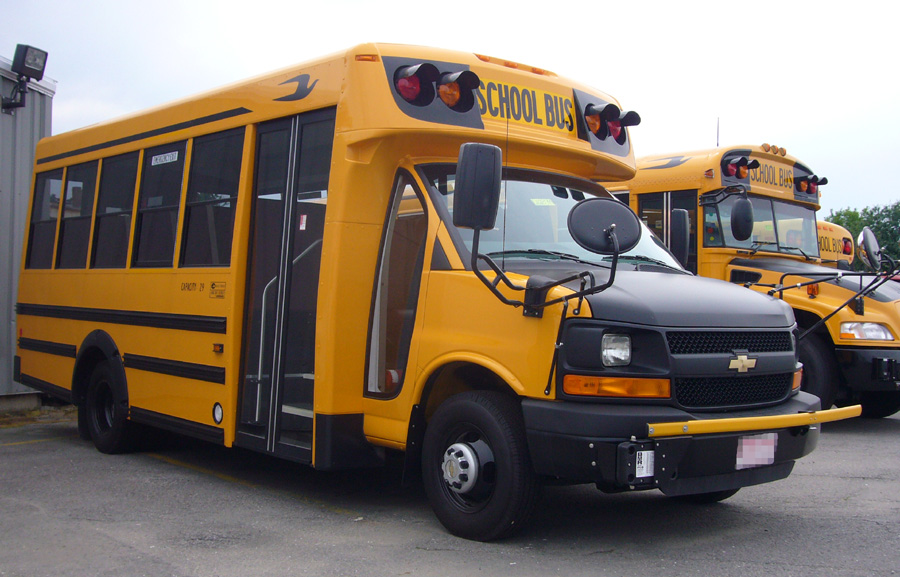
- 2011 Blue Bird Micro Bird G5 (Chevrolet Express 3500 chassis)

Overview
- Manufacturer: Girardin Minibus
- Also called: Blue Bird Micro Bird G5
- Model years: 2010-present
- Assembly: Canada: Drummondville, Quebec (Girardin Minibus)

Body and chassis
- Class: Type A (cutaway van chassis)
- Layout: dual rear wheel axle
- Platform: Ford E-350/E-450; Chevrolet Express/GMC Savana 3500/4500
- Chassis: Cutaway van chassis

Chronology
- Predecessor: Blue Bird Micro Bird DRW (first generation); Blue Bird MB-IV by Girardin

2020-2025 Blue Bird Micro Bird G5 (electric-power Ford E450 chassis); Quebec-specification bus

The third-generation Micro Bird is the Girardin-produced G5 series, replacing the 1975-2010 Micro Bird DRW. Introduced in 2005 to replaced the Girardin MB-IV, the G5 became a Blue Bird in 2010 under the Micro Bird joint venture, with changes primarily limited to its exterior branding.

Marketed alongside the MB-II, the G5 is offered solely on dual rear-wheel chassis (produced by both Ford and Chevrolet/GMC). In 2013, the Micro Bird G5 changed its roofline "streamer" from a full-length stripe to a singular design shared with the MB-II, Vision, and All American.

During 2005, Girardin Minibus introduced the G5, serving as the replacement for the MB-IV. As part of Micro Bird, Inc., the G5 became a Blue Bird in 2010, replacing the long-running first-generation Micro Bird. Distinguished by its squared-off roofline, the G5 is built solely on dual rear-wheel chassis. Starting in 2013, as with all Blue Birds, the design of the roofline "streamer" (roof stripe) was changed from a full-length design to a single-length design shared with the MB-II, Vision, and All American. An electric version of the micro bird G5 built on Ford E450 chassis is set to commerce production for 2019.

== Fourth generation (T-Series; 2015–present) ==
Fourth generation (T-Series)
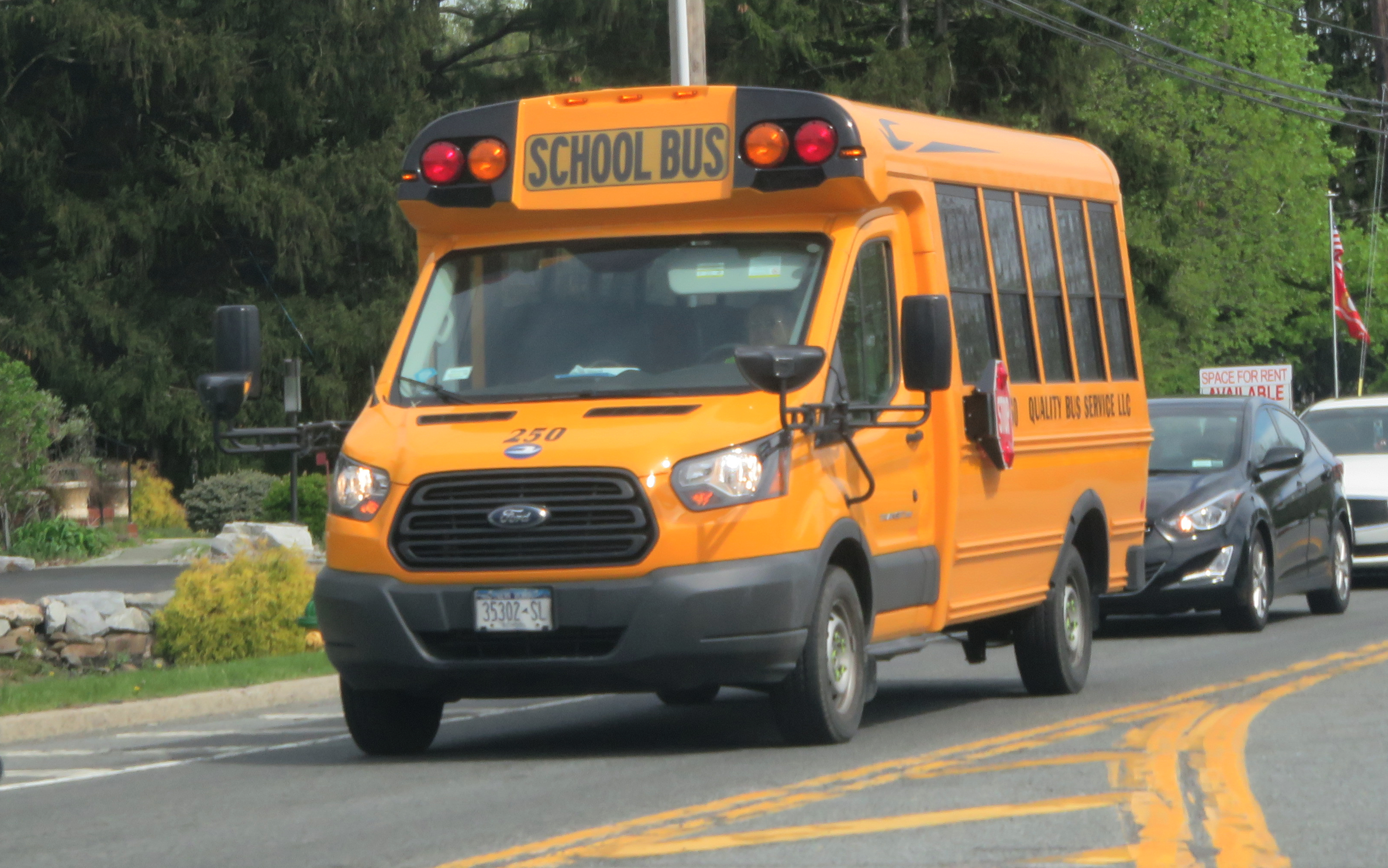
- 2016-2018 Blue Bird Micro Bird T-Series SRW (Ford Transit 350 chassis)

Overview
- Manufacturer: Girardin Minibus; Blue Bird Corporation (2026-present)
- Model years: 2010-present
- Assembly: Canada: Drummondville, Quebec (Girardin Minibus)

Body and chassis
- Class: Type A (cutaway van chassis)
- Layout: single rear wheel axle; dual rear wheel axle
- Platform: Ford Transit 350/350HD
- Chassis: Cutaway van chassis

Chronology
- Predecessor: Blue Bird MB-II by Girardin

In early 2015, the fourth-generation Micro Bird was launched: the T-Series. The first school bus body designed for the Ford Transit 350/350HD chassis, the T-Series was developed from the MB-II rather than the G5; it is fitted with an all-new roofline and a redesigned (all-glass) loading-door window.

In contrast to the MB-II and G5 produced alongside it, the T-Series is offered with either a single rear-wheel (Transit 350) or a dual rear-wheel axle configuration (Transit 350HD).

== Chassis manufacturers ==
Prior to the 1992 redesign of the Ford E-Series, the Micro Bird was produced nearly exclusively on the Chevrolet/GMC G30 dual rear-wheel cutaway van chassis.

Alongside the MB-Series, the Micro Bird expanded chassis availability to the Ford E-Series starting in 1992. From 1994 to 1996, General Motors offered a second chassis for the Micro Bird; to produce a heavier-duty version of its cutaway van, GM placed the cab of the G30 van on the higher-GVWR frame of the P30 "step-van" chassis; these versions are distinguished by an extended nose with a tilt-forward hood. The heavy-duty GM chassis was discontinued after 1996, as the company redesigned its full-size van line and the new Chevrolet Express/GMC Savana did not have bodywork designed to fit on the P30 chassis.

In 2014, Blue Bird became the first North American bus manufacturer to develop a body for the Ford Transit 350/350HD chassis that is replacing the Ford E-Series. Using a version of the Girardin MB body (Micro Bird T-Series), both single and dual rear-wheel configurations are produced.

Micro Bird Chassis Manufacturers
Chassis	Production	Fuel Type	Notes
Ford E-Series	1975-2010 (Micro Bird) 1992-1999 (MB-II/MB-IV) 2010–present (MB-II, G5)	Gasoline; Diesel; Propane (G5)	Propane-powered version of the G5 introduced in 2010
Ford Transit 350/350HD	2015 onward (T-Series)	Gasoline; Diesel	Launched as the Micro Bird T-Series, this is the first school bus adapted to the North American version of the Ford Transit cutaway cab. Produced in both single and dual rear wheel models.
Chevrolet Van/GMC Vandura	1975-1996 (Microbird); 1992-1996 (MB-II/IV)	Gasoline; Diesel	1992-1996 Chevrolet/GMC version of MB-II distinguished by use of stock van entry door
Chevrolet P30	1995-1996 (Micro Bird)	Diesel	Heavier-duty chassis with Chevrolet cutaway van bodywork; distinguished by extended tilt-forward hood
Chevrolet Express/GMC Savana	1997-2010 (Micro Bird); 1997-1999 (MB-II/MB-IV); 2010–present (MB-II, G5)	Gasoline; Diesel	

== Assembly ==
Prior to 2010, Blue Bird assembled the Micro Bird at the following manufacturing facilities:

- Blue Bird Body Company in Fort Valley, Georgia (1975–2010)
- Blue Bird Midwest in Mount Pleasant, Iowa (1975–2002)
- Blue Bird Canada in Brantford, Ontario, Canada (1975–2007)

== See also ==
- Blue Bird Corporation
- Blue Bird Mini Bird
- Wayne Busette
- Thomas Minotour
- List of buses
