= Fra Diavolo (disambiguation) =

Fra Diavolo (1771–1806) the Neapolitan guerrilla leader

Fra Diavolo can refer to:

- Fra diavolo sauce, a sauce
- Fra Diavolo (opera), an 1830 opera by Daniel Auber
- The Devil's Brother, a 1933 Laurel and Hardy film also known as Fra Diavolo
- The Adventures of Fra Diavolo, a 1942 film

== See also ==
- Diavolo (disambiguation)
