= Diavolo =

Diavolo, the Italian word for devil, may refer to:

- Diavolo Dance Theater, an American dance company
- The Devil (Papini book) (Italian: Il diavolo), a 1953 book by Giovanni Papini
- To Bed or Not to Bed (Italian: Il diavolo), a 1963 Italian film
- Il diavolo, a tarot card in the Tarocco Piemontese
- Diavolo Peak, a mountain in British Columbia

== Fictional characters ==
- Diavolo, a character in Golden Wind (1995–1999), a storyline in the Japanese manga series JoJo's Bizarre Adventure
- Diavolo Conroy, a character from the Eoin Colfer novels Iron Man: The Gauntlet (2016) and The Fowl Twins (2019)
- Nikolai Diavolo, a character from the video game James Bond 007: Everything or Nothing (2003)

== See also ==
- Diabolo (disambiguation)
- Fra Diavolo (disambiguation)
