= Diabolus in musica =

Diabolus in Musica can refer to:

== Music ==
- The musical interval of a tritone
- Diabolus in Musica (ensemble) (1992–present) a French medieval ensemble
- Diabulus in Musica, a Spanish symphonic metal band

=== Albums ===
- Diabolus in Musica, a 1998 album by Slayer
- Diabolus in Musica, Accardo interpreta Paganini, an album by Salvatore Accardo

=== Songs ===
- "Diabulus in musica", a song by Mägo de Oz on their album Gaia II: La Voz Dormida, also released as a single
