= Canyon Diablo =

Canyon Diablo may refer to:

- Canyon Diablo (canyon), originally named "Cañon Diablo", Northern Arizona, U.S.
- Canyon Diablo (meteorite), fragments found in Meteor Crater near the canyon
  - Canyon Diablo Crater, former name of Meteor Crater
- Canyon Diablo, Arizona, a ghost town near the canyon
- Canyon Diablo Bridge, an automobile bridge which crosses the canyon near the ghost town of Two Guns
- Canyon Diablo shootout, a 1905 gunfight at the canyon

== See also ==
- Diablo Canyon (disambiguation)
