= Diablo, Panama =

Coordinates: 8.970638°N 79.568446°W

Diablo was one of many residential townships in the Panama Canal Zone. It was established in 1905 by William Luke Jenkins.

It was one of the first townships to revert to Panamanian control after 1979 treaty. Moralist Panamanians attempted to rename the place "Altos de Jesus", which did not catch on. There had been an attempt to change the name decades earlier, which also failed.

== History ==
It was located directly across from the entrance to Albrook AFB, on a low hill overlooking the canal just past Balboa Harbor. Originally, Diablo Hill was much larger, with it being cut back to facilitate the relocation and rerouting of the Panama Railroad in the 1910s. It was reduced even further in the 1950s to accommodate new housing construction.

In the late 1930s through early 1940s, Diablo was the headquarters for the third locks project, it being located directly across the Canal from the Pacific side third locks and approach excavation.

The Engineering Division was headquartered here, and the Board of Local Inspectors (which investigated ship accidents) relocated here in the 1980s, using the old Diablo elementary school.

The "Diablo Clubhouse" was a center for social activity, and included a cafeteria, vending machines, a movie theater, bowling alley, barber shop, beauty shop, seamstress, tailor, a store for Boy Scout and Girl Scout uniforms and supplies, and a number of other services. When the building reverted to Panamanian control on October 1, 1979, all those services were terminated. The building later housed one of the first Panamanian stores to set up shop in the former Canal Zone, a 24-hour convenience store aptly named "24 Horas", but the building remained for the most part vacant and neglected.

In 1979, about half of the neighborhood became the property of the Republic of Panama, while the remainder continued to be held by the Panama Canal Commission (the new incarnation of the Panama Canal Company/government).

== Design ==
The streets are named after either Canal Zone governors or engineers who worked on the canal, including Alfred Nobel. They were the finest quality concrete with perfectly formed curbs and sidewalks. There were many steep and long hills for skateboards, go-carts, and bicycles. Kids could be found sliding cardboard boxes down the steep grassy hillsides on a nice day. There were many fields of grass on which one would find kids playing football, rain or shine.

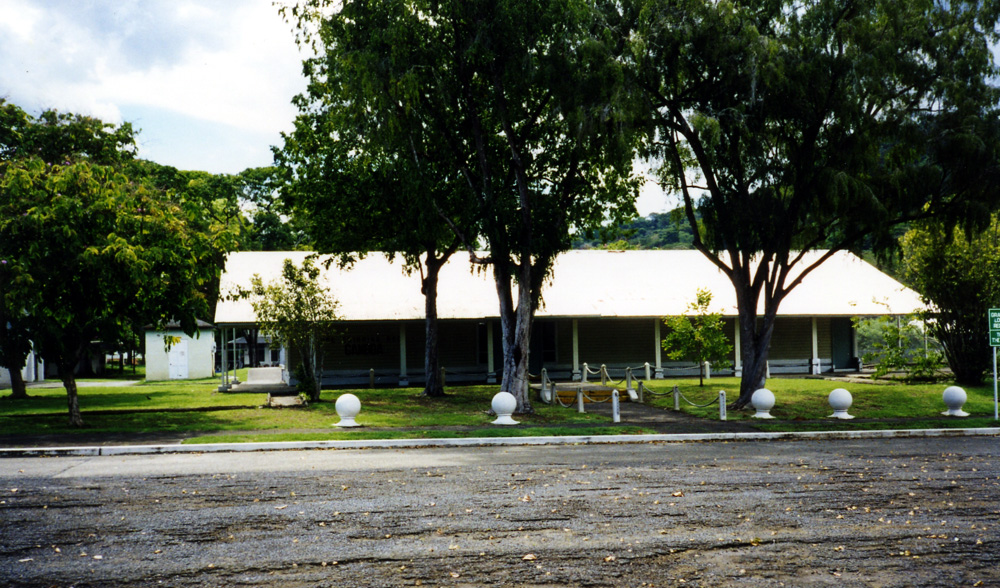
A transformer house can be seen on the left in the linked picture of Gamboa's Swimming Pool.

There were no visible phone lines or power lines, as they were all buried in the Canal Zone (with very rare exception). Small square white buildings hid the electrical transformers in the neighborhood, and one could hear them buzz when you walked by them.

There were many tropical trees, iguana, thousands of parrots. No billboards or commercial advertisements were visible anywhere. Yards were sometimes surrounded by thick hedges of hibiscus, but were never fenced.

Grass was cut everywhere to prevent disease. Therefore, it was rare that one would own a lawn mower. The houses had silver stainless steel garbage cans with lids. 55-gallon drums were spaced out along the streets, labeled "dry trash". Garbage was collected several time weekly by crews.

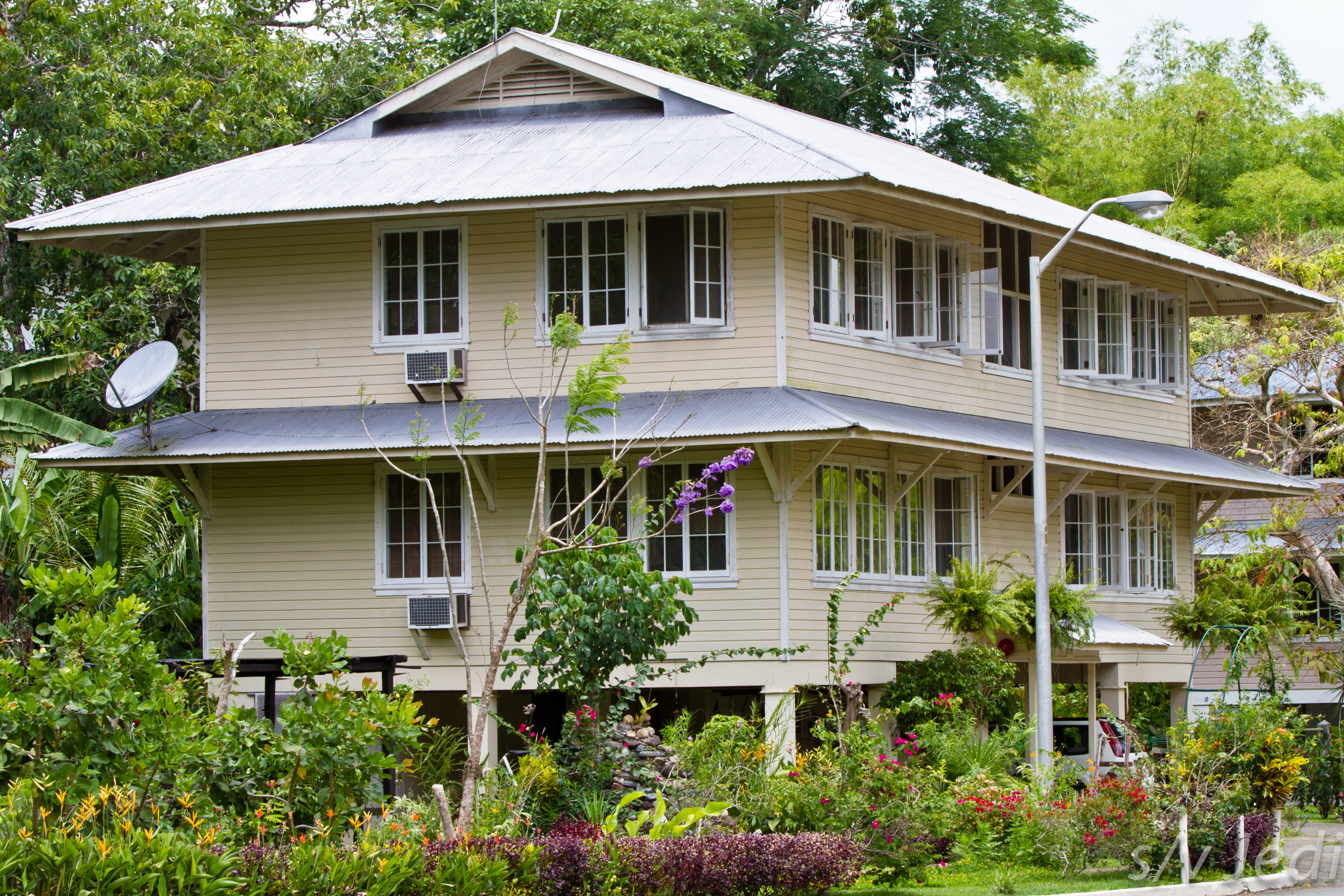
The linked picture is identical to the four-family dwellings in Diablo.

The houses were modest four-family, duplex, and single-family dwellings, of wood, concrete, or experimental steel construction. The four-family units were all three-story wooden construction built circa 1940. Of the remainder, the concrete homes were built in the 1950s when the layout of the neighborhood was changed. At that time, many multi-family dwellings (some 12-family) were removed. The remainder of the wooden construction are of the circa 1940 vintage. The experimental steel homes result from the sea-level canal project circa 1960.

All residents rented their home from the Panama Canal Company; no one owned their home. If a person did not work for the Panama Canal Company, they could not rent a home in Diablo (with occasional exceptions for U.S. military personnel and other special circumstances). The homes did not have built-in dishwashers or central air conditioning. There were no homes in the Canal Zone with swimming pools.

Also in Diablo were public tennis courts, the "Spinning Club" (a private club for fishermen and boaters), a public boat ramp, and the Diablo Picnic Area (a public area alongside the canal featuring 2 bohios, a grill, and the view of passing ships and tugboats). A large patch of mangrove swamp behind the Diablo Elementary School was home to many variety of birds and other wildlife. Almost all of the mangroves were removed to expand the Port of Balboa.
