= Diablo Mountains =

Diablo Mountains may refer to:

- Diablo Mountains (Arizona) of Arizona
- Diablo Range, in west central California
- Sierra Diablo Mountains, in west Texas
