= Diablo, California =

Diablo
- Unincorporated Community; Census Designated Place
- Location in Contra Costa County and the state of California

- Location in the United States
- Coordinates: 37°50′06″N 121°57′29″W
- Country: United States
- State: California
- County: Contra Costa

Government
  - State Senate: Tim Grayson (D)
  - State Assembly: Rebecca Bauer-Kahan (D)
  - U. S. Congress: Mark DeSaulnier (D)

Area
  - Total: 1.36 sq mi (3.53 km^{2})
  - Land: 1.36 sq mi (3.53 km^{2})
  - Water: 0 sq mi (0.00 km^{2}) 0%
- Elevation: 528 ft (161 m)

Population (2020)
  - Total: 1,255
  - Density: 920.3/sq mi (355.33/km^{2})
- Time zone: UTC-8 (PST)
  - Summer (DST): UTC-7 (PDT)
- ZIP code: 94528
- Area code: 925
- FIPS code: 06-19150
- GNIS feature IDs: 1655967, 2408668

Diablo (Spanish for "Devil") is a census-designated place (CDP) in Contra Costa County, California, United States. The population was 1,255 at the 2020 census. It is located 2.5 miles (4.0 km) east-northeast of Danville.

== Geography ==
According to the United States Census Bureau, the CDP has a total area of 1.4 square miles (3.6 km^{2}), all land.

== History ==
A post office was established at Diablo in 1916.

== Demographics ==
Historical population
Census	Pop.	Note	%±
2000	988		—
2010	1,158		17.2%
2020	1,255		8.4%
U.S. Decennial Census; 1860–1870 1880-1890; 1900 1910 1920; 1930 1940 1950; 1960 1970 1980; 1990 2000 2010

Diablo first appeared as a census designated place in the 2000 U.S. census created out of part of the Alamo CDP.

=== Racial and ethnic composition ===
Diablo CDP, California – Racial and ethnic composition Note: the US Census treats Hispanic/Latino as an ethnic category. This table excludes Latinos from the racial categories and assigns them to a separate category. Hispanics/Latinos may be of any race.
Race / Ethnicity (NH = Non-Hispanic)	Pop 2000	Pop 2010	Pop 2020	% 2000	% 2010	% 2020
White alone (NH)	909	1,035	1,001	92.00%	89.38%	79.76%
Black or African American alone (NH)	6	0	8	0.61%	0.00%	0.64%
Native American or Alaska Native alone (NH)	0	2	5	0.00%	0.17%	0.40%
Asian alone (NH)	29	55	100	2.94%	4.75%	7.97%
Native Hawaiian or Pacific Islander alone (NH)	0	0	0	0.00%	0.00%	0.00%
Other race alone (NH)	0	0	0	0.00%	0.00%	0.00%
Mixed race or Multiracial (NH)	9	27	61	0.91%	2.33%	4.86%
Hispanic or Latino (any race)	35	39	80	3.54%	3.37%	6.37%
Total	988	1,158	1,255	100.00%	100.00%	100.00%

=== 2020 census ===
As of the 2020 census, Diablo had a population of 1,255. The population density was 920.1 inhabitants per square mile (355.3/km^{2}).

The age distribution was 21.4% under the age of 18, 6.7% aged 18 to 24, 15.5% aged 25 to 44, 35.9% aged 45 to 64, and 20.6% who were 65 years of age or older. The median age was 49.8 years. For every 100 females, there were 103.7 males, and for every 100 females age 18 and over there were 106.9 males age 18 and over.

The census reported that 95.1% of the population lived in households, 4.9% lived in non-institutionalized group quarters, and no one was institutionalized. 100.0% of residents lived in urban areas, while 0.0% lived in rural areas.

There were 424 households, out of which 32.1% included children under the age of 18, 77.1% were married-couple households, 1.9% were cohabiting couple households, 13.2% had a female householder with no spouse or partner present, and 7.8% had a male householder with no spouse or partner present. 13.0% of households were one person, and 7.1% were one person aged 65 or older. The average household size was 2.81. There were 362 families (85.4% of all households).

There were 455 housing units at an average density of 333.6 units per square mile (128.8 units/km^{2}), of which 424 (93.2%) were occupied. Of these, 93.9% were owner-occupied, and 6.1% were occupied by renters. 6.8% of housing units were vacant; the homeowner vacancy rate was 0.0% and the rental vacancy rate was 16.1%.

== Education ==
Diablo is served by the San Ramon Valley Unified School District.

== See also ==
- Mount Diablo
