= Diabolo (disambiguation) =

A diabolo or diablo is a prop used in juggling.

Diabolo may also refer to:

- Diabolo (manga), a 2001 manga set in Japan
- The most common air gun pellet, design
- The Diabolo project, a railway line serving Brussels Airport
- In mathematics, the second polyabolo
- Diabolos or Diabolus, the devil
- Diabolo (drink), a non-alcoholic mixed drink, popular in France, consisting of a lemonade mixed with a syrup.
- Tritone, a musical interval referred to as diabolo
- Diabolo, a genus of moths
- Diabolo (film), a 1992 Ghanaian film
- Ron "Diabolo" Weasley, a character from the Harry Potter-based fan fiction My Immortal

== See also ==
- Devil sticks, a similar juggling prop to the diabolo
- Diablo (disambiguation)
- Diavolo (disambiguation)
