= Diablo Canyon =

Diablo Canyon may refer to:

- Diablo Canyon (album), by Outlaws
- Diablo Canyon Power Plant, California, U.S.
- Diablo Canyon, a feature of Caja del Rio in New Mexico, U.S.
- Diablo Canyon, site of Diablo Dam, in Washington, U.S.

== See also ==
- Canyon Diablo (disambiguation)
