= Second stage manufacturer =

A second stage manufacturer, known in the industry as "bodybuilder," builds such products as bus and truck bodies, ambulances, motor homes, and other specialized vehicles. Such a manufacturer usually takes an incomplete structure from a first-stage manufacturer, and installs additional equipment to render it suitable for delivery to a buyer for use.

Neither their product, nor the first stage portion, called an incomplete motor vehicle, are fully compliant with all of the requirements for a complete motor vehicle without the other.

Cutaway van chassis are one of the more popular incomplete motor vehicles for second stage manufacturers to use as a platform for their products. A large portion of small school buses, minibuses, and recreational vehicles are based upon cutaway van chassis.
