= Chassis cab =

Truck type

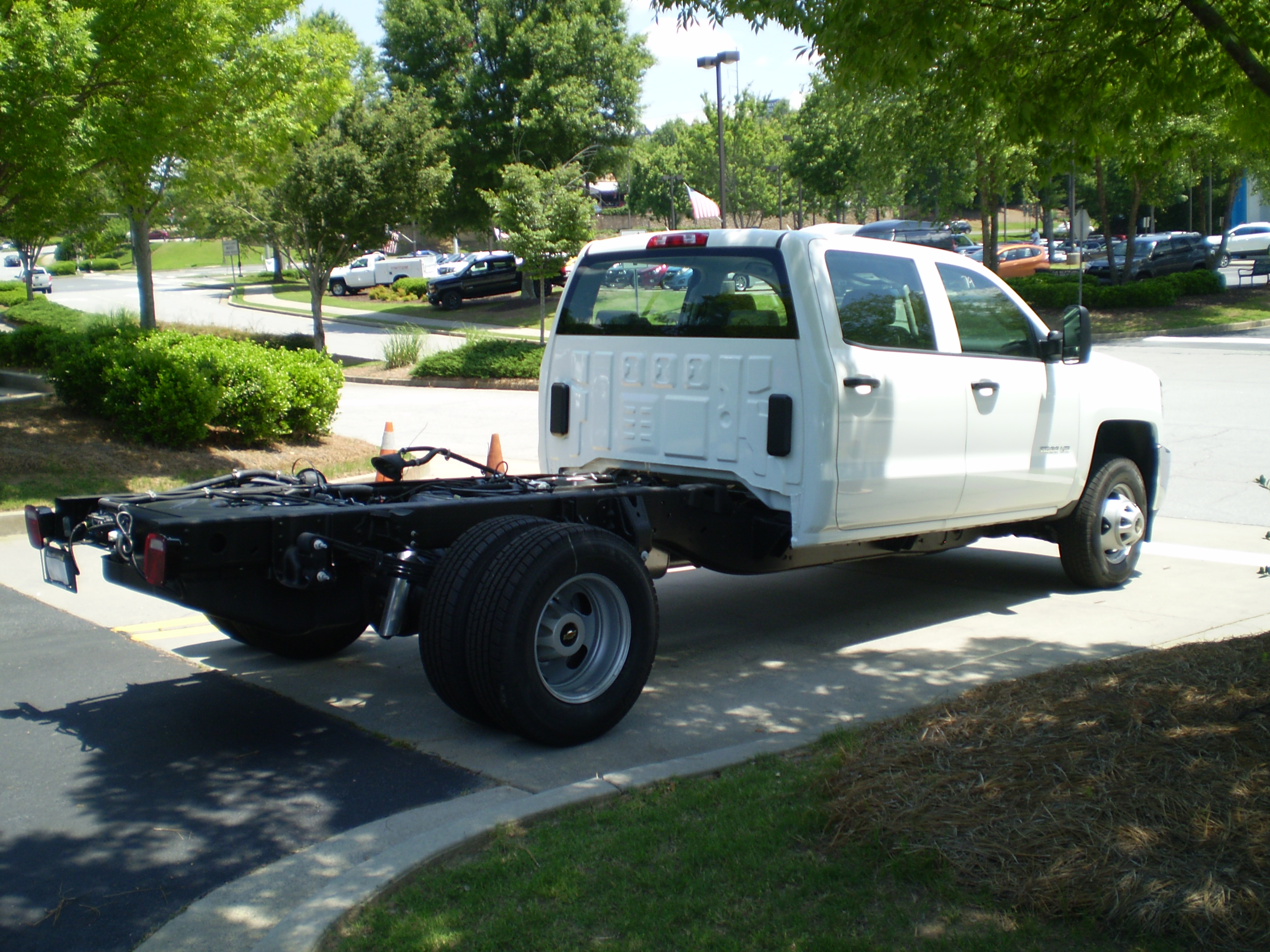
Chevrolet Silverado chassis cab

A chassis cab, also called a cab chassis or half truck, is a type of vehicle construction, often found in medium duty truck commercial vehicles.

Instead of supplying the customer with a factory pre-assembled flatbed, cargo container, or other equipment, the customer is given the vehicle with just chassis rails and a cab. This allows the customer to add any desired aftermarket equipment, such as fire apparatus, ambulance, or a recreational vehicle conversion package, which can be customized for the specific needs of the customer.

Cutaway van chassis are similar, but lack specific components at the such as the cabin's rear wall and sometimes the cabin roof.

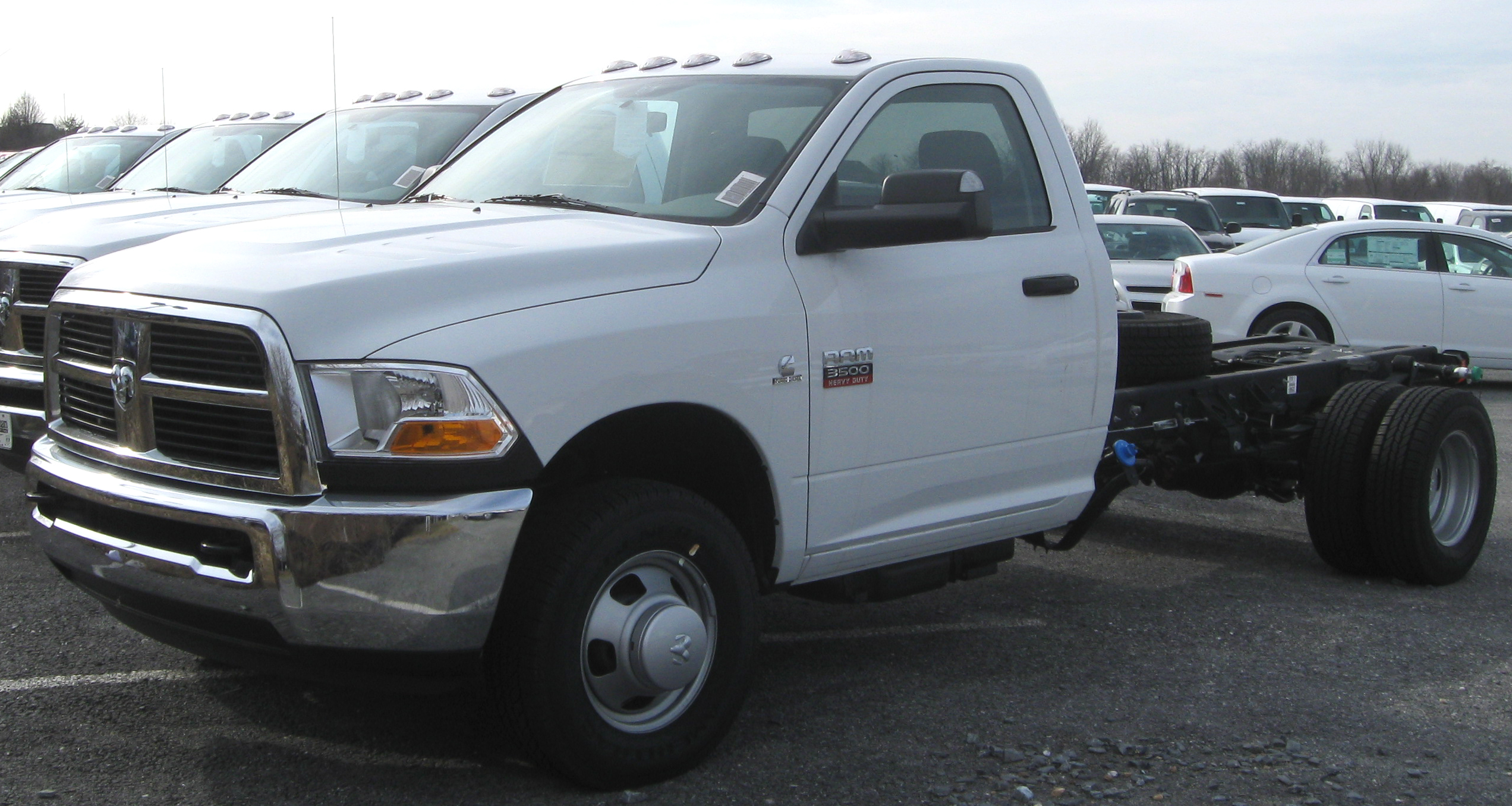
2011 Ram 3500 chassis cab

Vehicles of this type are produced by Ford, Chevrolet/GMC, and Ram Trucks.

== History ==
A number of 1950s cars were supplied as chassis cabs for coachbuilders to convert into hearses, ambulances, shooting brakes. Austin Motors produced the Austin Sheerline and Austin Princess model in chassis cab configuration.
