= Cutaway van chassis =

Incomplete vehicle for further assembly

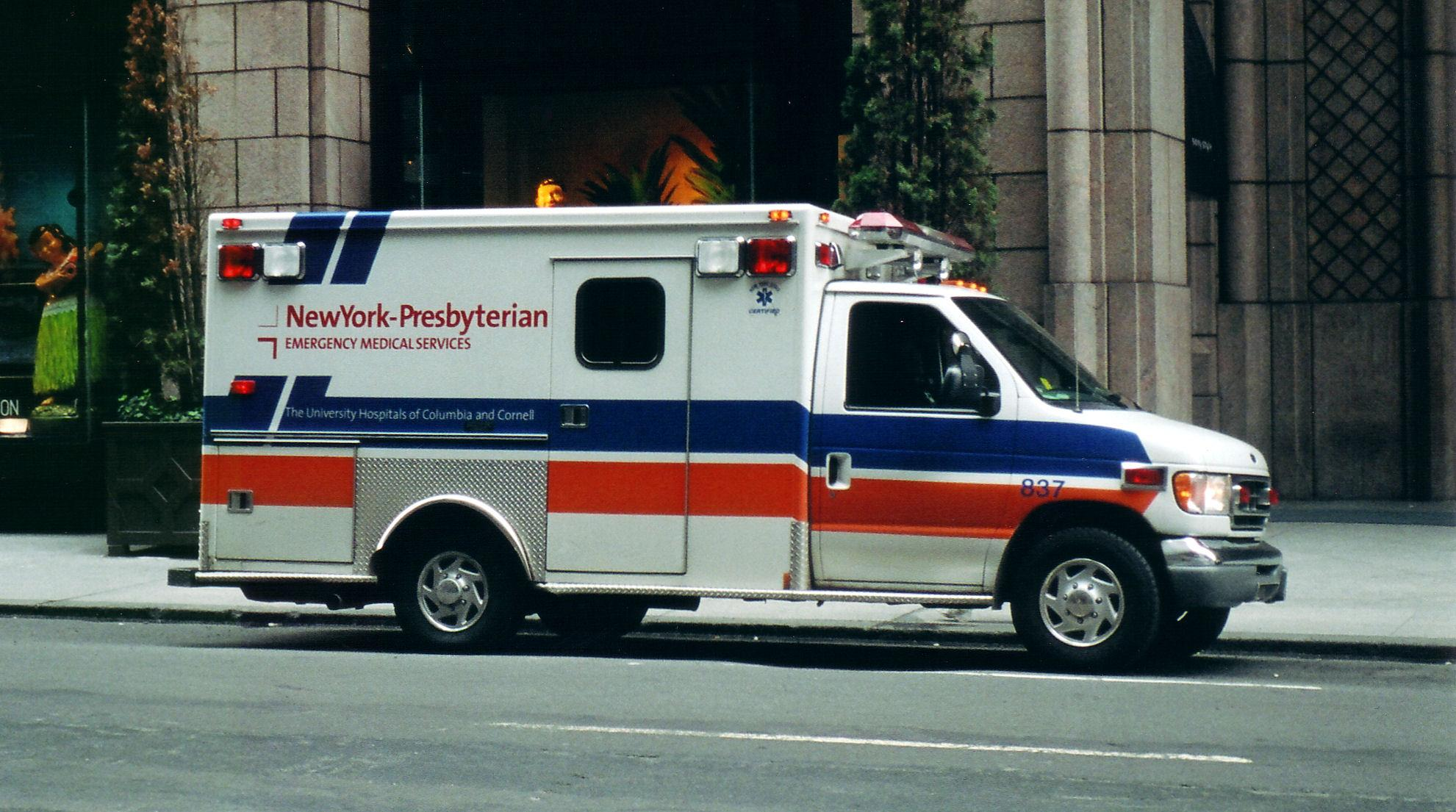
This Type III ambulance photographed in New York City is based upon a Ford cutaway van chassis with a modular body. The dual rear wheels add stability and weight capacity and the cutaway feature facilitates access between the cab and the patient care areas.

Cutaway chassis is a type of chassis cab where the van or truck cab is manufactured incomplete, usually without a back wall, and sometimes without a roof and doors, thus allowing second stage manufacturers to add modules or bodies to complete a wide range of motor vehicles. This also allows access and/or passage to and from the cab into and out of the added body. Cutaways are popular in the North America, where they are made by manufacturers including FCA US, Ford, and General Motors (to name a few), and are generally equipped with heavier-duty components than most of their complete products. Common applications of this type of vehicle design and manufacturing include small trucks, school buses, recreational vehicles, minibuses, and ambulances. The term "cutaway" can be somewhat of a misnomer in most of the vehicle's context since it refers to truck bodies for heavy-duty commercial-grade applications sharing a common truck chassis.

== Design history ==
Following the initial popularity of Volkswagen's imported minibuses such as Volkswagen Type 2 (T1) and Volkswagen Type 2 (T2), vans made by the domestic manufacturers were developed and became popular in the United States in the 1960s. By the early 1970s, Chrysler Corporation, Ford Motor Company, and General Motors were all manufacturing many models of passenger and utility vans. The Dodge passenger vans of Chrysler had a maximum seating capacity of 14 persons plus the driver and came to be commonly known as 15-passenger vans, joined by similar-sized models by the other manufacturers years later.

Conversions for personal motor homes became very popular, drawing the interest of recreational vehicle manufacturers. Based upon that, cutaway van chassis were developed in the early 1970s to accommodate demand for conversions which were heavier and wider than the standard production vans completed by the major auto and truck manufacturers (i.e. Chevrolet-GM, Dodge, and Ford). As they began working on bigger models of their popular light-duty van products, they developed cutaway van chassis solely for use by second stage manufacturers.

=== Busette: first of the cutaway school buses ===
Busette, developed by Wayne Corporation in 1972, was the first successful small school bus to be based on a cutaway van chassis with dual rear wheels. With a low center of gravity and the dual rear wheels, Busette provided a combination of increased seating capacity and handling stability over conventional vans and van conversions.

By the early 1980s, all five of the major school bus body companies in the United States had developed competing products built on the cutaway van chassis. These manufacturers were joined by several others which specialized in small school buses. In the early 1990s, Mid Bus, an Ohio manufacturer specializing in small school buses, purchased the tooling and product rights to build the Busette from Wayne Corporation, and produced Busettes for a few more years. In modern times, more small school buses are based upon cutaway van chassis than any other type.

Most school bus body builders also produce models for non-school use, often called a "commercial minibus".

== Manufacture ==
As produced by the first stage (van) manufacturers, a cutaway van chassis generally features a van front end and partial cab design. The body ends immediately behind the driver, and sometime lacks a roof, and front passenger seats, and is usually covered by temporary plywood or heavy cardboard material for shipment to the various second stage manufacturers. It was soon known by the name "cutaway van chassis" in recognition of this feature. Higher-GVWR vehicles are derived from medium-duty truck chassis.

Second stage manufacturers, known in the industry as "body-builders," build such products as bus and truck bodies, motor homes, and other specialized vehicles. Neither their product nor the first stage portion, legally defined as an "incomplete motor vehicle" under the Federal Motor Vehicle Safety Standards (FMVSS) in the US, are fully compliant with requirements for a complete motor vehicle. Neither portion can be licensed or operated lawfully without the other. Many cutaway chassis are equipped with dual rear wheels and can handle greater weight loads than the basic vans upon which they were based.

== Design overview ==
=== Ambulances ===
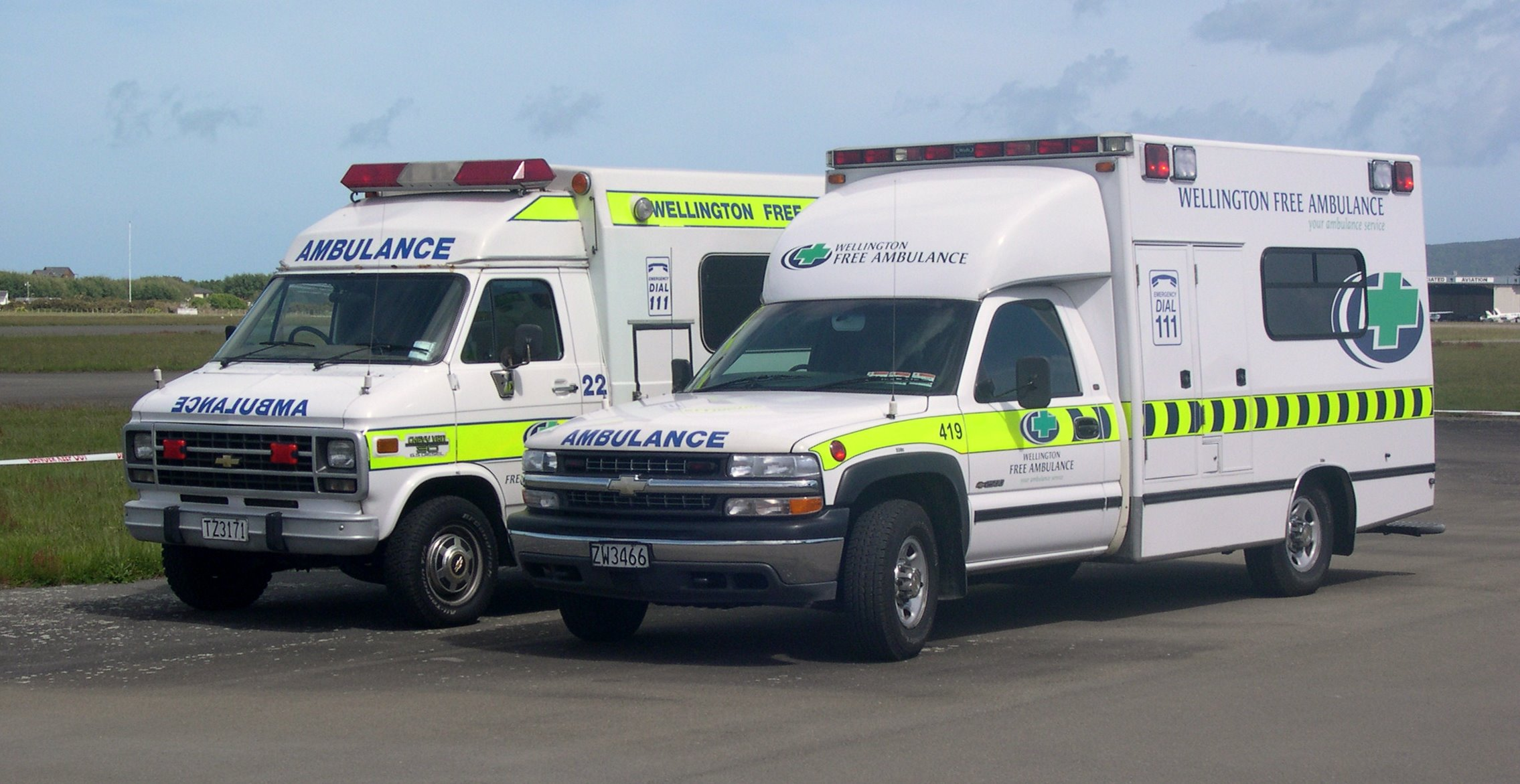
Chevrolet G30 and Silverado cutaway-chassis ambulances (New Zealand)

In the United States, the 1973 National EMS Systems Act, which was passed by Congress in 1974, and implemented four years later (in 1978), required that communities receiving federal funds for their programs have ambulances that met new federal specifications. The regulations included minimum width and other requirements which virtually eliminated car-based vehicles. The last American-made car-based ambulance was built in 1978.

The United States General Services Administration has published a standard for ambulance construction, KKK-A-1822F, which has been adopted by many states and localities, including Nebraska, Illinois, Mississippi, Oregon, and Decatur County, Indiana. Designs based upon the cutaway van chassis with modular bodies are defined as Type III. (Type I uses a pickup truck chassis, and Type II is a straight conversion of a van with a raised roof rather than a modular body.) This standard is due to be withdrawn in 2015 in favor of NFPA 1917.

Many of these models have access between the driver and the patient care area, which, for some applications, is a favorable feature over a full cab chassis with a modular box.

The same standards are practiced in Canada, but the legislation defining the types are provincially determined.

=== Commercial minibuses ===
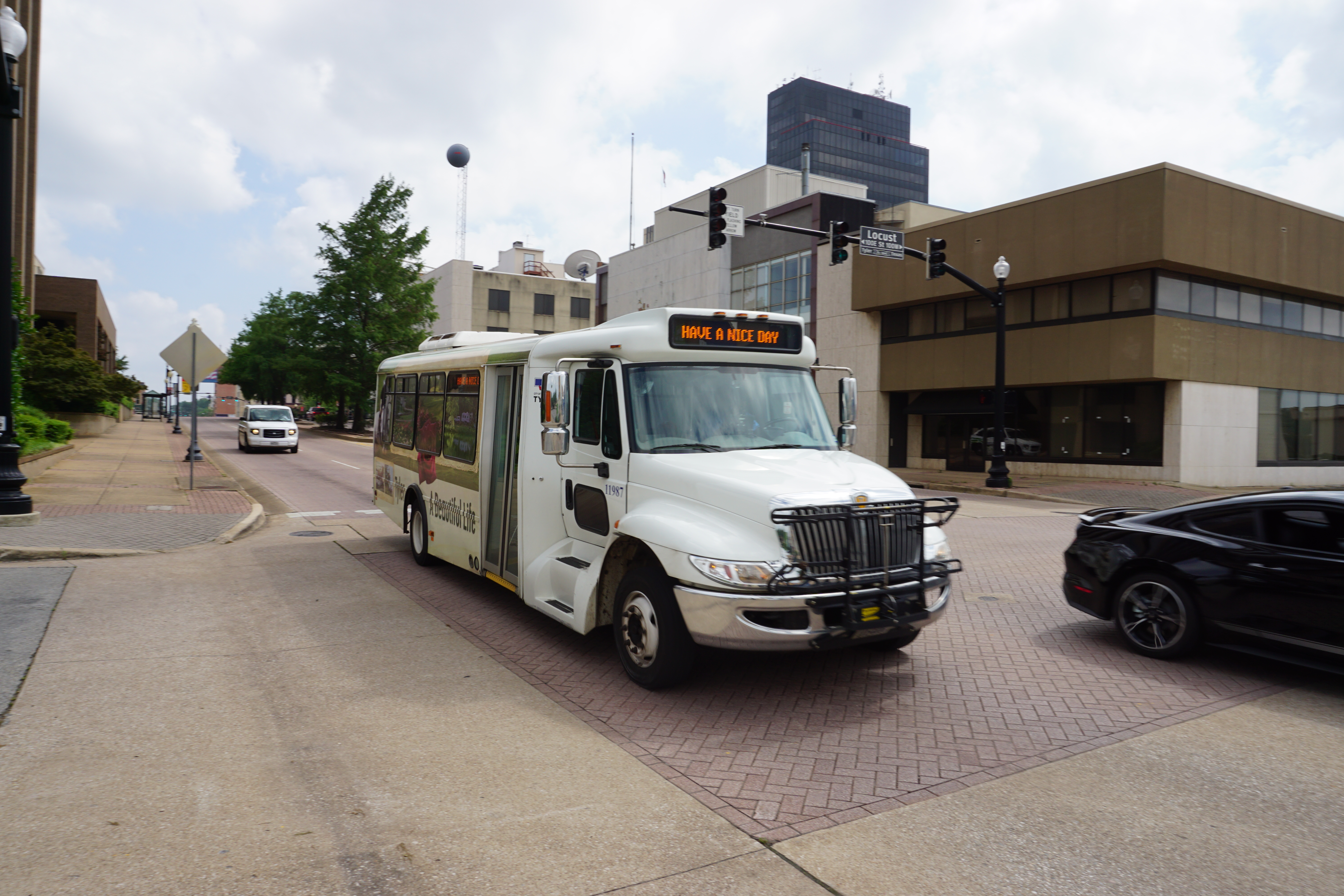
This International Durastar cutaway chassis has a low-floor minibus body produced by second-stage manufacturer IC Bus.

Seeking to expand product offerings, several recreational vehicle manufacturers, notably Champion, ElDorado National, Turtletop, and others, also developed minibus models using cutaway van chassis and body construction similar to their motorhomes. With their products, they joined the school bus body companies in seeking and expanding markets.

Minibuses customarily have a seating capacity of between 8 and 30 seats. They are used in a wide variety of applications. In a public transport role, they can be used as fixed-route transit buses, airport buses, flexible demand-responsive transport vehicles, share taxis or large taxicabs. Wheelchair accessible minibuses can also be used for paratransit-type services by local authorities, transit operators, hospitals or charities. Private uses of minibuses can include corporate transport, charter buses, tour buses, and for non-profit organizations such as churches.

=== Delivery trucks ===
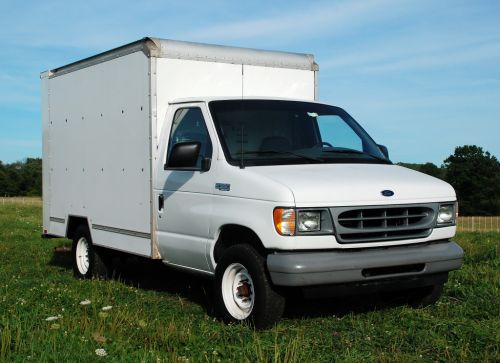
This Ford E350 SRW cutaway van chassis has a delivery truck body typical of that used in truck rental fleets.

Cutaway van chassis also became a popular platform for delivery vehicles and light trucks. Their size and payload capacity made them well-suited for commercial applications. Box trucks built on single rear wheel cutaway van chassis were comparable in size and carrying capacity to earlier single rear wheel step vans, while box trucks built on dual rear wheel cutaway van chassis were similar to earlier dual rear wheel step vans. Unlike traditional step vans, however, cutaway vans featured a more automobile-style cab design, offering improved driver comfort and visibility.

With easier adjustment of drivers accustomed to operating automobiles than most types of small trucks, they found especially strong acceptance in rental truck fleets. Usually, the entrance is via a large door in the rear which opens almost the full width of the body. Some models such as those offered by U-Haul use small dual rear wheels to provide the least amount of intrusion of the rear wheel wells into the cargo area.

=== Recreational vehicles (motor homes) ===
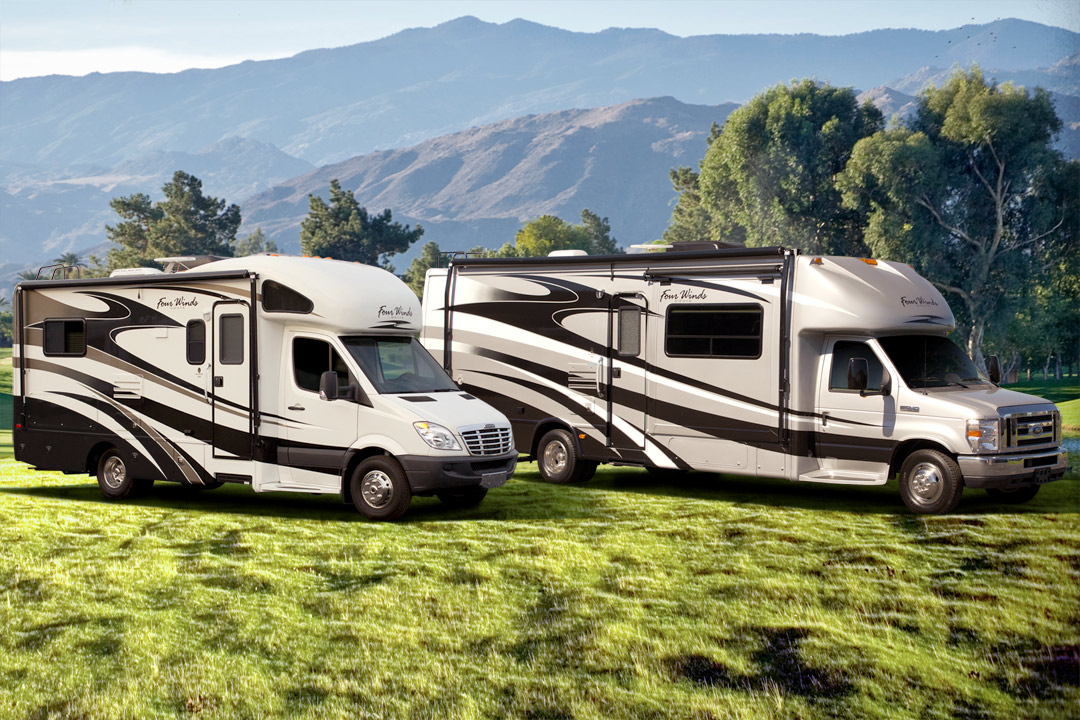
Two Class C motor homes bodied by Thor Motor Coach: a Freightliner Sprinter (left) and a Ford E450 chassis

A recreational vehicle (or "RV") is a motor vehicle dually used as both a vehicle and a temporary travel home. They are also called "motor homes" and are very popular in North America. By the mid-1970s, recreational vehicle builders were building models based upon cutaway van chassis.

Within the industry, a motor home based upon a cutaway van chassis is a Class C motor home. It is built on a truck chassis with an attached cab section, which is usually cutaway van chassis based (but may also be pickup truck based or even large truck based). They are often (but not necessarily) characterized by a distinctive "cab-over" profile, the portion of the coach over the cab containing a bed or an "entertainment" section.

== See also ==
- Ambulance
- Bus manufacturing
- Conversion van
- Delivery (commerce)
- Minibus
- Multi-stop truck
- Pickup truck
- Recreational vehicle
