= Blue Bird TC/2000 =

School bus model

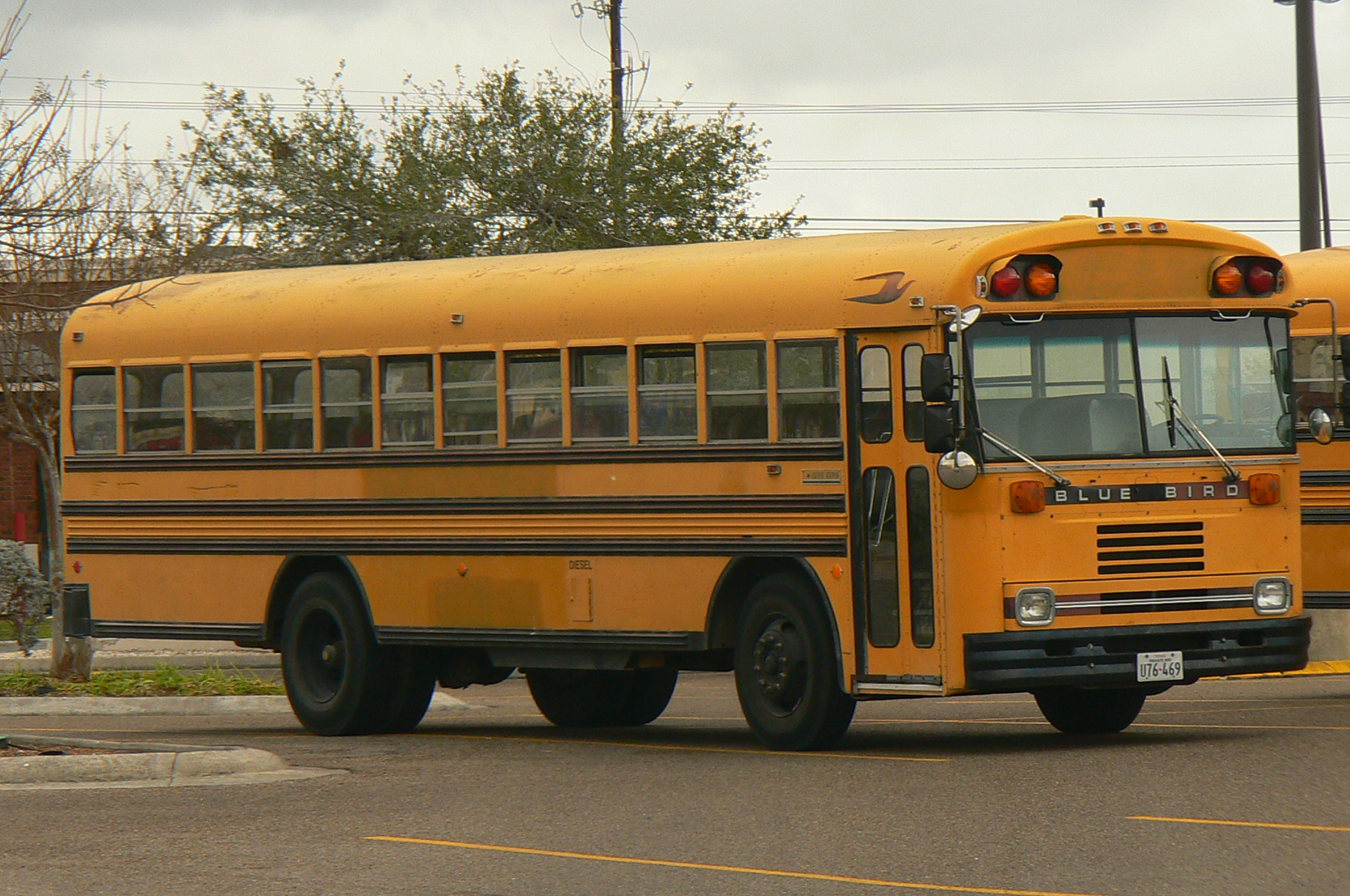

Overview
- Manufacturer: Blue Bird Corporation
- Also called: Blue Bird APC 2000
- Production: 1987-2003
- Assembly: Fort Valley, Georgia (Blue Bird Body Company); LaFayette, Georgia (Blue Bird North Georgia); Mount Pleasant, Iowa (Blue Bird Midwest); Buena Vista, Virginia (Blue Bird East); Brantford, Ontario, Canada (Blue Bird Canada)
- Designer: Blue Bird Corporation

Body and chassis
- Class: Type D (transit-style)
- Body style: Integral chassis: School bus; Commercial bus (APC2000)
- Layout: Front-engine 4x2 (1987-2003); Rear-engine 4x2 (1991-1999)
- Platform: Blue Bird
- Related: Blue Bird CS; Blue Bird TC/1000

Chronology
- Predecessor: Blue Bird All American (1957-1989)
- Successor: Blue Bird All American (A3)

The Blue Bird TC/2000 is a product line of buses that was produced by the American manufacturer Blue Bird Corporation (then Blue Bird Body Company) from 1987 to 2003. Introduced as a second transit-style product range alongside the Blue Bird All American, the TC/2000 was produced in front-engine and rear-engine layouts. While produced primarily as a yellow school bus, Blue Bird offered the TC/2000 in commercial configurations and numerous custom-built variants. For commercial use, Blue Bird badged the model line as the TC/2000 or the APC 2000 (All Purpose Coach).

In 2003, Blue Bird ended production of the TC/2000 (after a short run of 2004 models), consolidating its transit-style product range with the All American. During its production, Blue Bird assembled the TC/2000 at five assembly facilities, including: Blue Bird Body Company (Fort Valley, Georgia), Blue Bird North Georgia (LaFayette, Georgia; closed 2010), Blue Bird Midwest (Mount Pleasant, Iowa; closed 2002), Blue Bird East (Buena Vista, Virginia; closed 1992), and Blue Bird Canada (Brantford, Ontario; closed 2007).

== Background ==
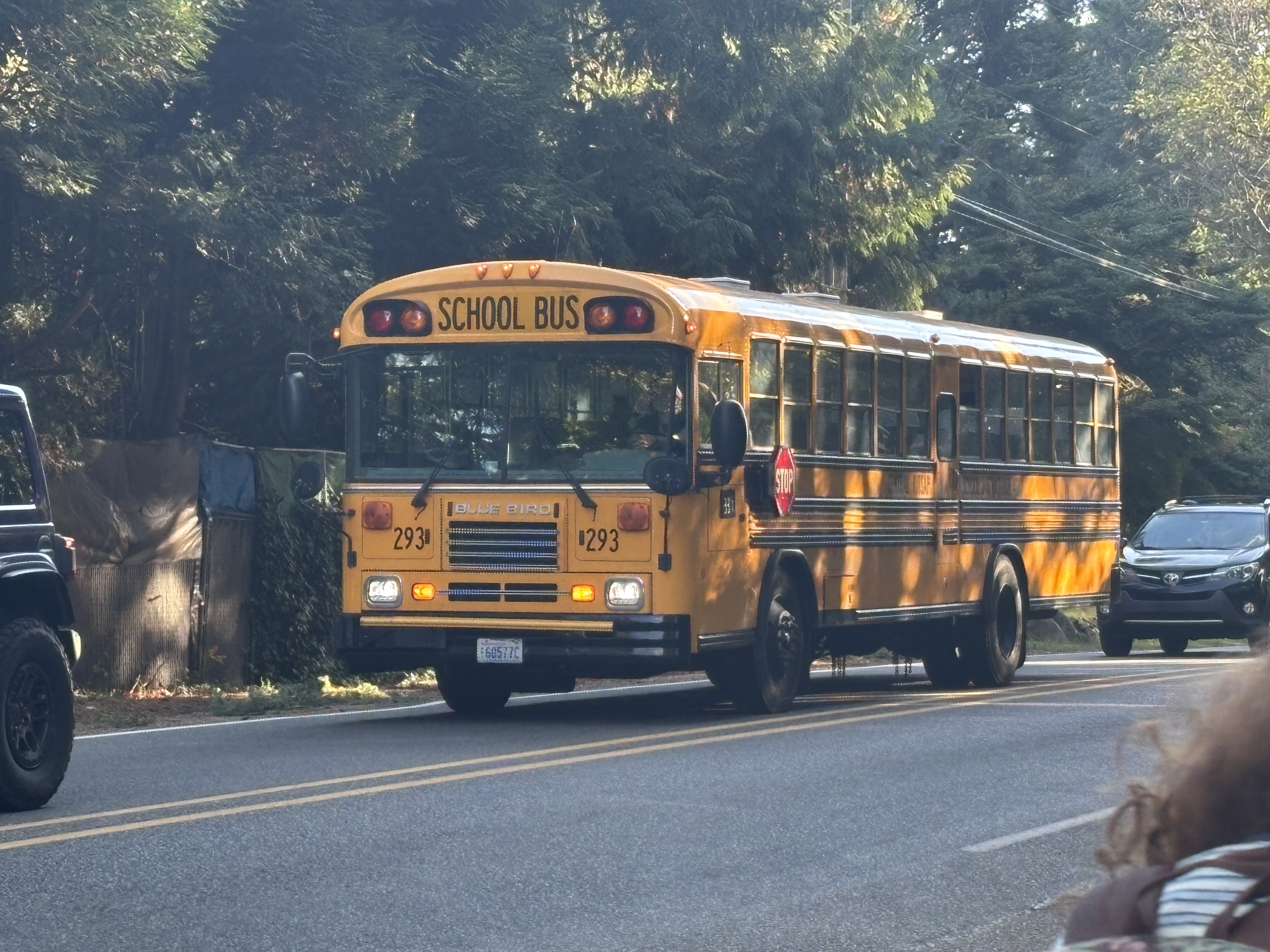
2002 TC-2000 #293 in active service with Central Kitsap School District

In the 1930s, transit-style (flat-front) school buses made their first appearance as manufacturers sought to develop school buses with higher capacity and greater maneuverability. Before World War II, California-based manufacturers Crown Coach, Gillig and Seattle-based Kenworth-Pacific had put various versions of the type into production; the most common was the forward-control bus, with the engine positioned next to the driver.

After World War II, Blue Bird company founder Albert Luce developed the first Blue Bird All American; similar to a bus he viewed at the 1948 Paris Auto Show, it was also of a forward-control design. Unable to secure a supply of GMC chassis, Luce produced the initial All Americans on conversions of conventional truck chassis, as was the practice of the time. In 1952, the company would make a decision that would forever affect the production of the All American, and potentially all school buses in the United States. Starting that year, Blue Bird started chassis production for the All American; aside from the powertrain, the company now was able to control nearly the entire design of the vehicle. Following a major redesign for 1957, Blue Bird would only make gradual detail changes to the All American for the following 32 years.

As the highest-capacity vehicles (84 to 90 passengers vs. 60 to 72 passengers) produced in the United States, transit-style school buses had become marketed as the flagship vehicles of their respective manufacturers (the All American also had the distinction of being the donor vehicle of the costly Blue Bird Wanderlodge motorhome). However, as the 1970s became the 1980s, school bus demand declined sharply. Declining student populations coupled with the overall recession magnified the overall importance of securing orders by contractors and large school districts. While higher-capacity buses could potentially lower operating costs across a large fleet, higher purchase prices were an increasingly hard sell to customers.

In 1986, the first low-price transit school bus was introduced. Wayne Corporation debuted the Lifestar; its high degree of parts commonality allowed it to be priced nearly the same as the Wayne Lifeguard conventional. However, chassis supply for the Lifestar would be plagued for much of its production run, which would render it non-competitive.

During the late 1980s, along with a low-priced bus such as the Lifestar, Blue Bird was faced with having to compete with the All American; aside from powertrain updates, it had gone nearly unchanged since the early 1960s. To solve both problems, the TC/2000 was introduced in 1987. While much of the same body (the passenger compartment, also shared with the Conventional and Mini Bird) was shared along with the chassis, major changes were done to the forward body in the interest of lowering production costs. Chrome trim was virtually eliminated and the grille was changed from 14 slots to 4. The quad headlights of the All American were replaced with dual rectangular units on the TC/2000; when the All American was redesigned in 1989, the headlight count became the easiest way to tell the two buses apart.

Inside, in the interest of lowering production costs and introducing an updated design, the TC/2000 was given its own drivers' compartment. The All American's wood-panel dashboard was replaced with a black fiberboard design with the instruments positioned closer to the driver (who was greeted with a smaller steering wheel). An all-new side control console made its way into the All American in its 1989 redesign. As in the All American Forward Engine, student seating capacity ranged from 54 to 90.

Mechanically, the TC/2000 continued the same theme of lowering production costs; Blue Bird developed relatively few combinations that could be built. At its 1987 launch, only a front-engine version was produced. Although the All American was produced with several available transmissions, a gasoline engine, and at least 3 diesel engines options, the TC/2000 was produced only with the Chevrolet 7.0L gasoline V8 as standard with the Cummins 5.9L diesel inline-6 as an option; nearly all were produced with the Cummins. A 5-speed manual was standard, with the Allison AT545 as an option, but nearly all customers specified the automatic. Later in 1991, compressed natural gas (CNG) became an alternative fuel option on the RE variant, with an 8.1L John Deere engine. It was the first ever school bus to be offered with CNG as an alternative fuel.

== Design timeline ==
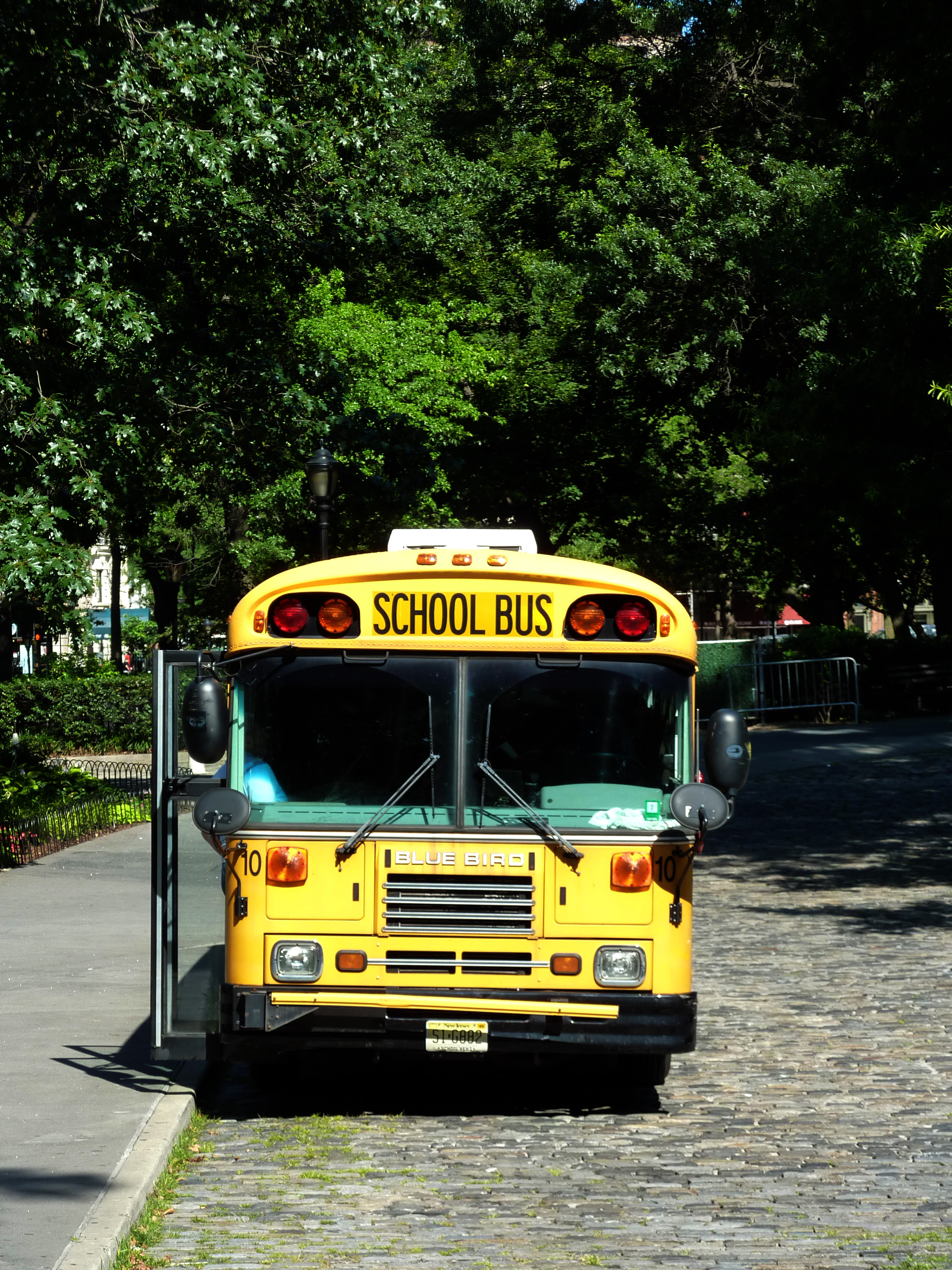
1998-2003 TC/2000 Front Engine

- 1988: Late 1987 entry into production;; produced only with front-engine configuration. Gasoline (Chevrolet 7.0L) and diesel (Cummins 5.9L) engine offerings.
- 1989: Minor update to front lights: rectangular reflectors from All American replaced by square units in between headlights.
- 1990: Largely unchanged from 1988–1989
- 1991: As a running change, TC/2000 Front Engine is redesigned with a flip-up exterior access panel, improving access and serviceability for drivers and mechanics; the grille is redesigned for improved ventilation. Inside, the engine cover is redesigned to take up less space in the driver compartment. TC/2000 Rear Engine introduced (to attract operators who use the configuration). 8.1L John Deere engine introduced as a Rear Engine option, becoming the first-ever factory-produced school bus to use compressed natural gas (CNG).
- 1992: Front bodywork redesigned on both front and rear-engine bodies, with the base of the windshield lowered several inches. Both versions adopt three hinged panels to allow access for service points and the engine radiator (replacing the previous flip-up panel).
- 1993: Following changes to the Cummins engine, the interior engine cover was given a lower profile. In a functional change, the automatic transmission shifter was relocated from the left side of the instrument panel to the right.
- 1994: To lower production costs, the TC/2000 adopted several components from the General Motors medium-duty truck line (the chassis used by the Blue Bird CV200), including its instrument panel.
- 1995: The Chevrolet 7.0L V8 is discontinued as an engine offering.
- 1996: Carryover from 1995
- 1997: TC/1000 introduced (see notes) as a smaller-capacity variant of the TC/2000 Front Engine.
- 1998: Carryover from 1997
- 1999: TC/2000 Rear Engine discontinued, replaced by All American A3RE. GM-sourced instrument cluster replaced by electronically-controlled design with digital odometer and supplementary gauges. Outside, the headlight bar becomes all-yellow.
- 2000: Carryover from 1999; TC/1000 discontinued
- 2001: Electronic instrument panel replaced by larger analog-style instrument panel shared with All American (with slight visible differences between the two)
- 2002: Side control panel (in use since 1987) replaced by newer version sourced from redesigned All American. Last known year for fitment of a 5-speed manual transmission.
- 2003: Carryover from 2002. Final vehicles built before end of year, concluding a short run of 2004-production vehicles.

=== Discontinuation ===
With the 1997 introduction of the TC/1000, Blue Bird produced a total of five distinct transit-style school buses. Consequently, the variety would lead to some model overlap. In 1999, Blue Bird discontinued the rear-engine version of the TC/2000; it was indirectly replaced by the new-for-1999 All American RE. Blue Bird's financial problems of the early 2000s (decade) led to the discontinuation of the TC/2000 FE at the end of 2003 in an effort to consolidate its Type D school bus lineup.

== Powertrain ==
To keep the price down, Blue Bird simplified the powertrain lineup with a single gasoline engine (a Chevrolet 427 cubic-inch V8) and a single diesel engine (a Cummins 6BTA5.9/ISB inline-6). Theoretically, a manual transmission was available, but almost all TC/2000s were supplied with an Allison AT-545 automatic transmission. When the TC/2000 RE was added in 1991, the Cummins C 8.3/ISC 8.3, John Deere CNG, and Allison MT-643 were added to the lineup; however, these were exclusive to the RE. After 1995, the gasoline engine choice was dropped due to the popularity of diesel engines in Type D school buses.

Engine Name	Chevrolet 427 cubic-inch V8	Cummins 6BTA5.9/ISB	Cummins C 8.3/ ISC 8.3	Caterpillar 3116	John Deere 6068H/6081H	Cummins B5.9G
Fuel type	Gasoline	Diesel	Diesel	Diesel	Compressed Natural Gas (CNG)	Compressed Natural Gas (CNG)
Years Available	1987-1995	1987-2003	1991-1999	1991-1999	Unknown-2003	1991-Unknown
Usage	TC/2000 FE only	TC/2000 FE; TC/2000 RE	TC/2000 RE only	TC/2000 RE only	TC/2000 RE only	TC/2000 RE only
Notes	Standard equipment on TC/2000 FE; Dropped after 1995 due to low demand	Option on TC/2000 FE from 1987 to 1995.; Only engine on TC/2000 FE after Chevrolet V8 dropped.; Standard engine on TC/2000 RE	Only available on TC/2000 RE (as option).	Only available on TC/2000 RE (as option).	Only available on TC/2000 RE (as option).	Only available on TC/2000 RE (as option).

== Manufacturing ==
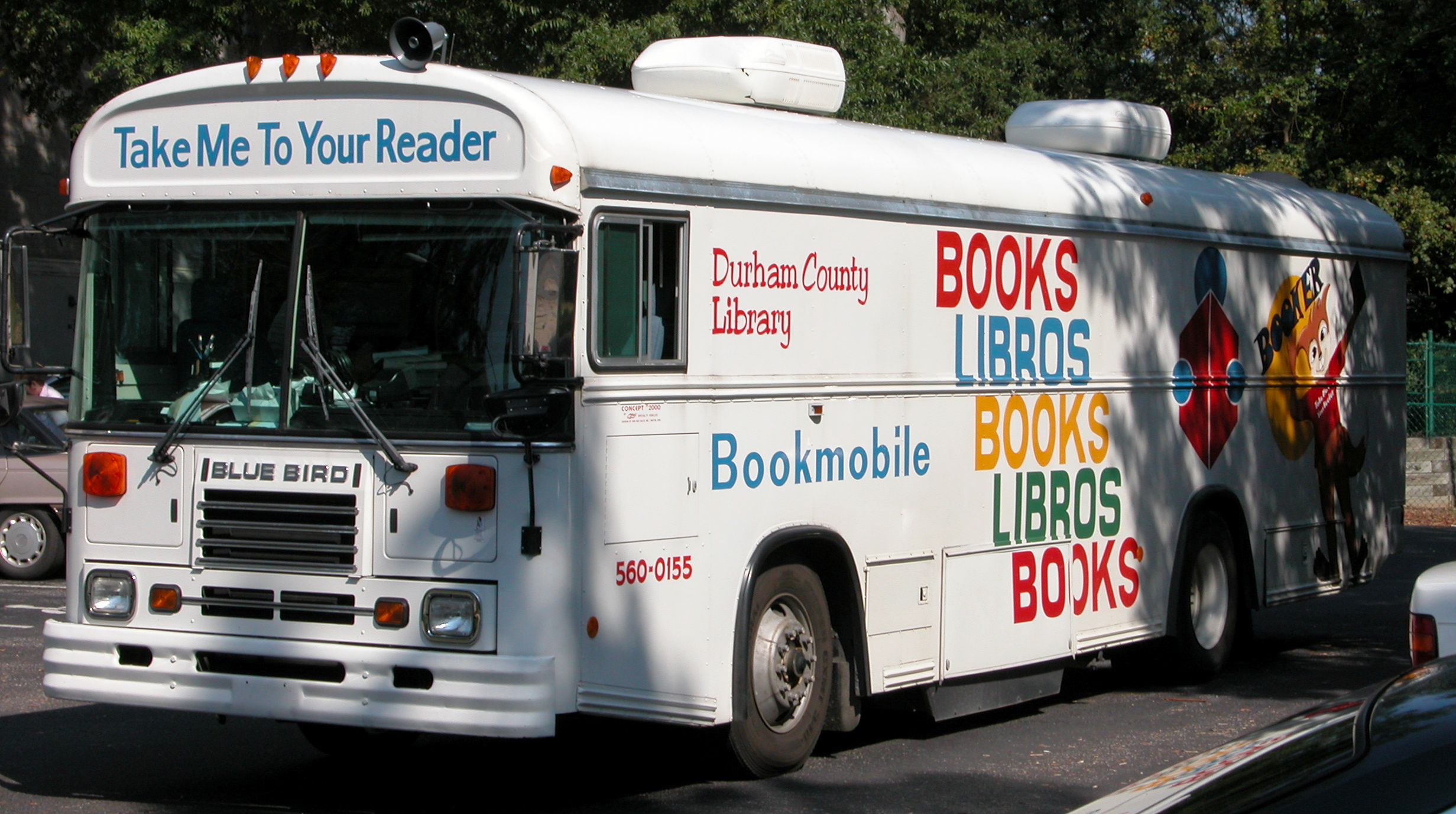
A 1998-2003 TC/2000 in use as a bookmobile.

Over its lifetime, the TC/2000 was assembled in five of Blue Bird's manufacturing facilities.

- Blue Bird Body Company (Fort Valley, Georgia)
- Blue Bird North Georgia (LaFayette, Georgia); closed 2010
- Blue Bird Midwest (Mount Pleasant, Iowa); closed in 2002.
- Blue Bird Canada (Brantford, Ontario); closed in 2007
- Blue Bird East (Buena Vista, Virginia); closed in 1992

== Variants ==
=== Blue Bird TC/1000 ===
The TC/1000 was a variant of the TC/2000 FE intended primarily for buyers who transported special-needs students. The vehicle was designed with a completely flat interior floor (to match the wheelchair capacity of a much larger bus). Shortened to a 132-inch wheelbase, the front-engine TC/1000 shares a nearly identical chassis configuration as the larger TC/2000. To eliminate wheel intrusion into the interior, the bus chassis used lower-profile 19.5-inch wheels. After 1998, Blue Bird revised the body of the TC/1000, squaring off the corners of the roofline.

The TC/1000 was not a large success, competing against less-expensive school buses derived from van chassis; the model line was phased out after 1999 production. While Blue Bird has not produced a successor model line, the squared-off roofline returned in the design of the 2010-2013 All American.

=== Commercial derivatives ===
Alongside the All American, the TC/2000 (and TC/1000) served as the donor platform for several Blue Bird commercial buses during the 1990s. Using the same body as the school bus, the APC 2000 was designed with a variety of different seating types as well as interior luggage storage. Geared more towards transit and shuttle use (in line with the Q-Bus), the CS featured a number of exterior modifications to the body; a TransShuttle version based on the TC/1000 was designed with an optional central-mounted door. In addition to fully built buses, Blue Bird produced the CS as a "shell vehicle"; it was a bare body without windows or an interior intended for purchase to be converted into various types of specialty vehicles.

In addition to transit-oriented buses, Blue Bird also produced the CS/APC and TC/2000 for use in law enforcement. While typically utilized as prisoner transports, some variants were also outfitted as mobile command centers.

== See also ==
- Blue Bird All American
- AmTran RE
- Thomas Saf-T-Liner MVP
- Wayne Lifestar
- Ward Senator (AmTran Genesis)
