= Blue Bird Mini Bird =

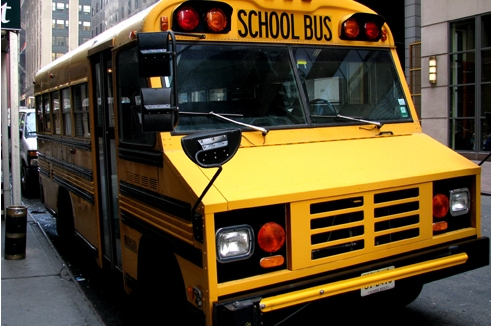

Overview
- Manufacturer: Blue Bird Corporation
- Production: 1977-2002
- Designer: Blue Bird

Body and chassis
- Class: Type B (integrated)
- Body style: Stripped chassis: School bus; Commercial bus
- Layout: 4x2
- Platform: Chevrolet P30 Step Van

Powertrain
- Engine: Gasoline; Diesel

The Blue Bird Mini Bird is a Type B school bus built by Blue Bird Corporation, introduced in 1977 and based on the Chevrolet Step Van. It was discontinued in 2002 as market tastes shifted away from Type B school buses.

== Overview ==
In 1977, Blue Bird introduced the Mini Bird as a Type B school bus. It was designed with a maximum capacity of 38 students, higher than the Type A cutaway vans of the time. In the manner of larger Type C and Type D buses, the Mini Bird was designed with a 96" (243 cm) wide body and 77" (195 cm) headroom. The Mini Bird's large interior dimensions proved popular with operators that carried special-needs students, which was the primary market for the Mini Bird.

Over its production life, the Mini Bird changed very little from its introduction. Aside from powertrain changes, the most significant changes amounted to a change of the instrument panel in the early 1990s, when the GM-van sourced instruments were replaced with a larger instrument cluster sourced from GM medium-duty trucks (similar to changes also made in the TC/2000). In 1995, the round headlights were replaced with square versions.

== Mechanical Details ==
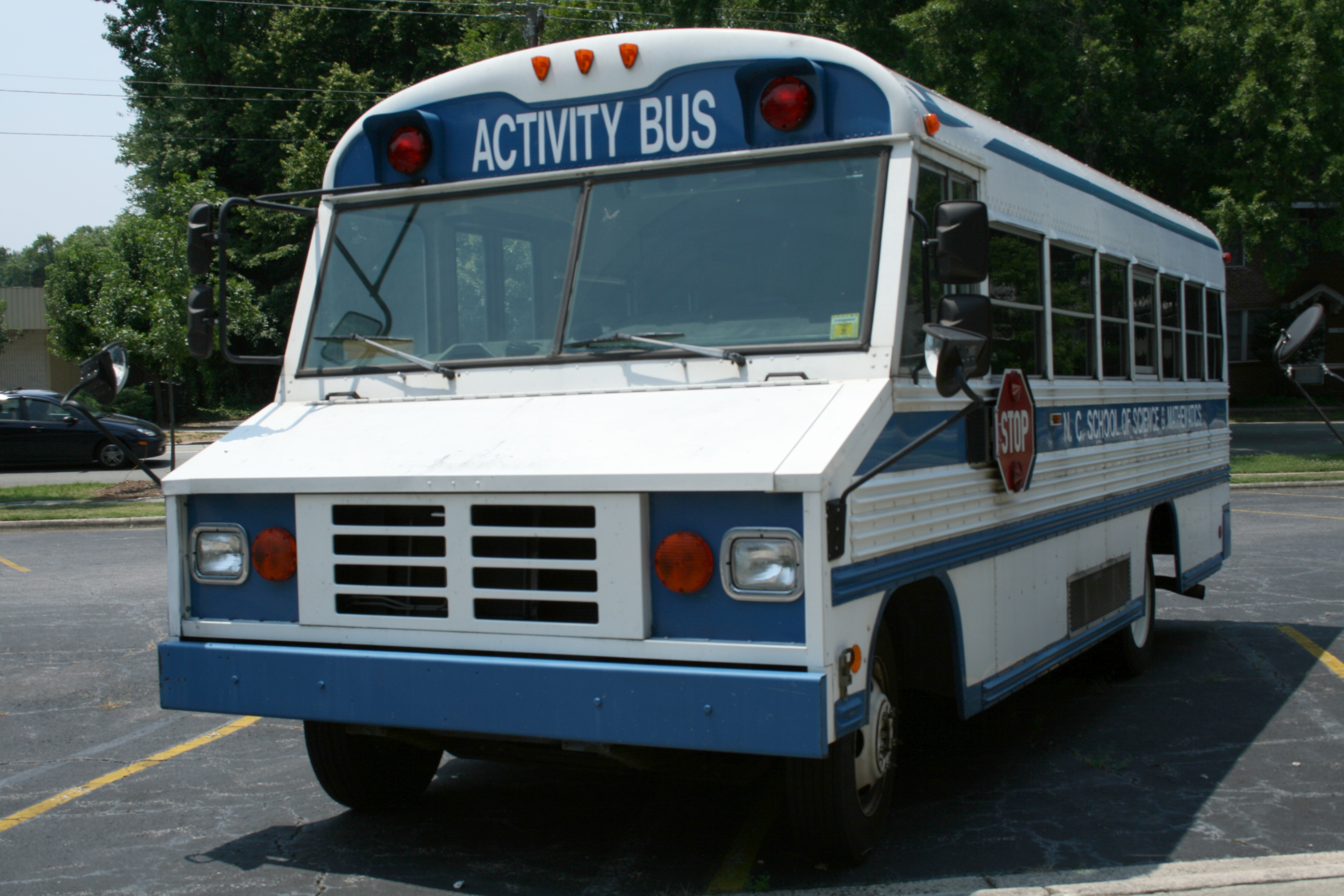
1995-2000 Blue Bird Mini Bird activity bus

The Mini Bird was based on Chevrolet's P30 step-van chassis and was initially available only with a gasoline engine. In the 1980s, diesel engines (the Chevrolet 6.2L) became an option. In the 1990s, the 6.2L diesel V8 was replaced with a more powerful 6.5L diesel.

== Manufacturing ==
Unlike other models in the Blue Bird lineup, the Mini Bird was not assembled in Fort Valley, Georgia. Assembly of the Mini Bird took place in Buena Vista, Virginia (Blue Bird East; which closed in 1992) and in Mount Pleasant, Iowa (Blue Bird Midwest, which closed in 2002). Following the closure of Blue Bird Midwest in 2002, Blue Bird ended production of the Mini Bird.

== See also ==
- List of buses
