= Blue Bird Corporation =

American bus manufacturer

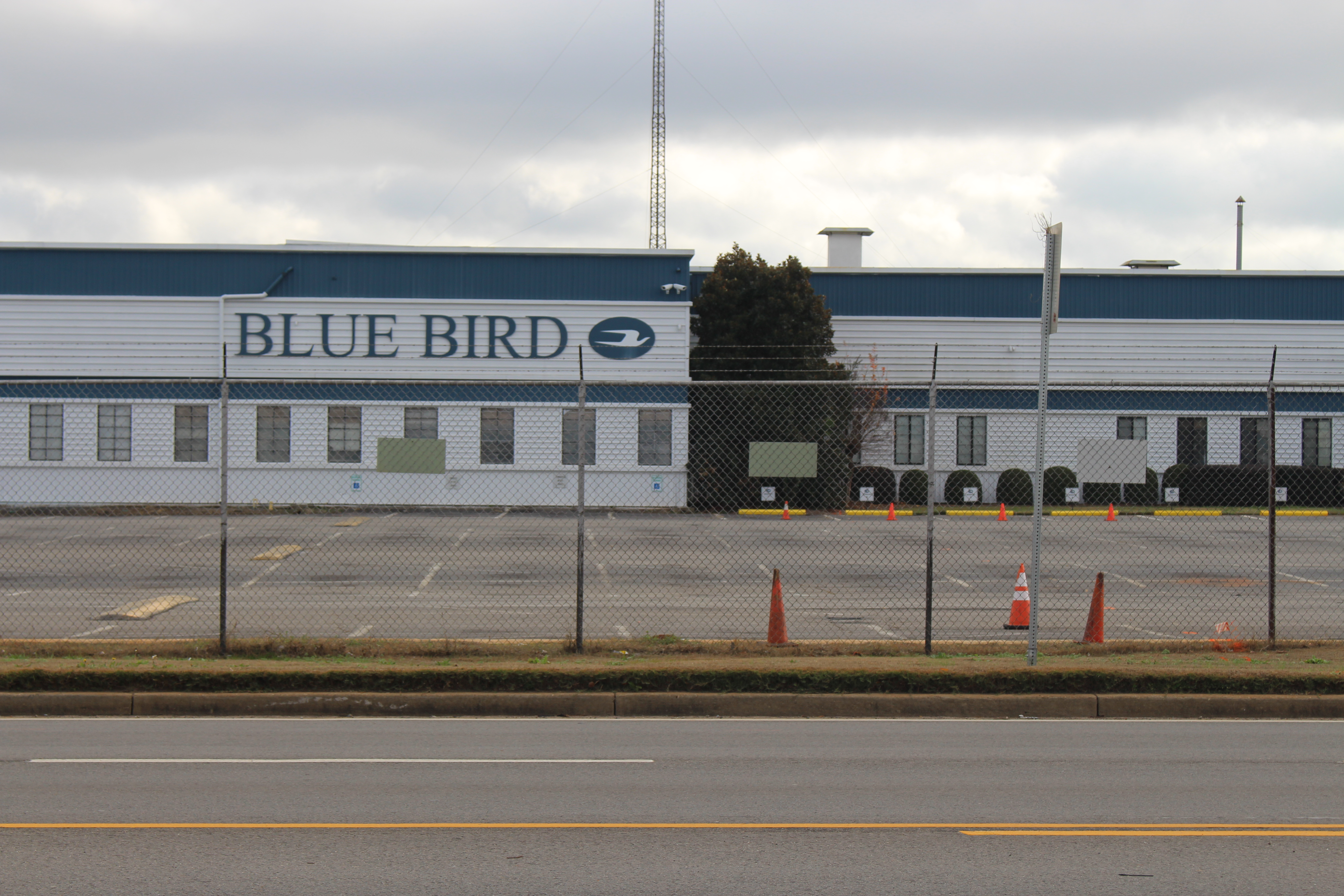
- Blue Bird Corporation, Fort Valley, Georgia
- Type: Public
- Traded as: Nasdaq: BLBD; Russell 2000 Component
- Industry: Bus manufacturing
- Founded: 1932; 94 years ago, in Fort Valley, Georgia, U.S.
- Founder: Albert L. Luce, Sr.
- Headquarters: Fort Valley, Georgia, U.S.
- Area served: 60+ countries
- Key people: John Wyskiel (president and CEO)
- Products: School buses; School pupil activity buses
- Revenue: ▲US1.13 billion (2023)
- Net income: ▲US$24 million (2023)
- Owner: Merrill Lynch Capital Partners (1992–1999); Cerberus Capital Management (2006–2014, still owns 58% of shares)
- Number of employees: 1,830 (2023)
- Parent: Henlys plc (1999–2004)
- Website: www.blue-bird.com

The Blue Bird Corporation (originally known as the Blue Bird Body Company) is an American bus manufacturer. Headquartered in Fort Valley, Georgia, the company was best known for its production of school buses. The company has also manufactured a wide variety of other bus types, including transit buses, motorhomes, and specialty vehicles such as mobile libraries and mobile police command centers.

Since the 1990s, the company has concentrated on the development of alternative-fuel vehicles in the segment. Along with the production of propane, natural gas, and gasoline-fuel buses, Blue Bird has expanded the development of zero-emissions vehicles, introducing electric-powered versions of each of its product lines.

After producing his first bus in 1927 as a side project, A.L. Luce founded Blue Bird Body Company in Fort Valley, Georgia in 1932. Remaining under family control into the early 1990s, Blue Bird changed hands several times in the 2000s, with the company becoming publicly owned in February 2015 (with previous owner Cerberus Capital Management holding a 58% share). The company currently assembles vehicles in its Fort Valley, Georgia facility, its headquarters since 1946. Currently, Blue Bird is the only American full-line school bus manufacturer under American ownership, and concentrates its product lineup on school buses, school pupil activity buses, and specialty vehicle derivatives.

== History ==
=== 1927–1930s ===
As the second quarter of the 20th century began, Albert Luce Sr. was an entrepreneur who developed some of the earliest purpose-built school buses, transitioned from wagons. What is now Blue Bird Corporation began life as a side project in a Ford Motor Company dealership in Perry, Georgia. Along with the dealership in Perry, Luce owned the Ford franchise in Fort Valley, Georgia, a rural farming community south of Macon.

In 1925, Luce sold a customer a Ford Model T with a wooden bus body; the customer sought to use the bus to transport his workers. Due to a combination of unsatisfactory construction quality of the bus body and the rough conditions of the rural Georgia roads, the wooden bus body started to disintegrate before the customer had finished paying for the vehicle. Driven to produce an improved design to sell to his customers, Luce sought input to develop a stronger bus body capable of surviving unimproved roads. In place of wood, Luce constructed his bus body from steel and sheet metal; wood was used as a secondary material. Completed in 1927, the bus was put into use as a school bus.

While buses would initially remain a side project for Luce (with only nine bus bodies produced between 1929 and 1931), the onset of the Great Depression would change his company forever. Following a 95% decline in car sales in 1931, Luce sold both of his Ford dealerships, using the $12,000 proceeds from the sale to begin his own company, concentrating solely on bus production. Inspired to begin production in order to support the local economy, Luce also felt school buses would be a necessary resource as part of the shift towards consolidated schools.

The early use of farm wagons on a part-time basis soon evolved into purpose-built school bus products, each with economy and function as major priorities. In 1937, the company began production of full-steel bus bodies, an innovation which soon replaced the wooden bodies which were then in common use around the United States.

In a 1939 industry conference, Blue Bird engineers contributed to the selection of school bus yellow, still in use today.

==== Blue Bird Number One ====
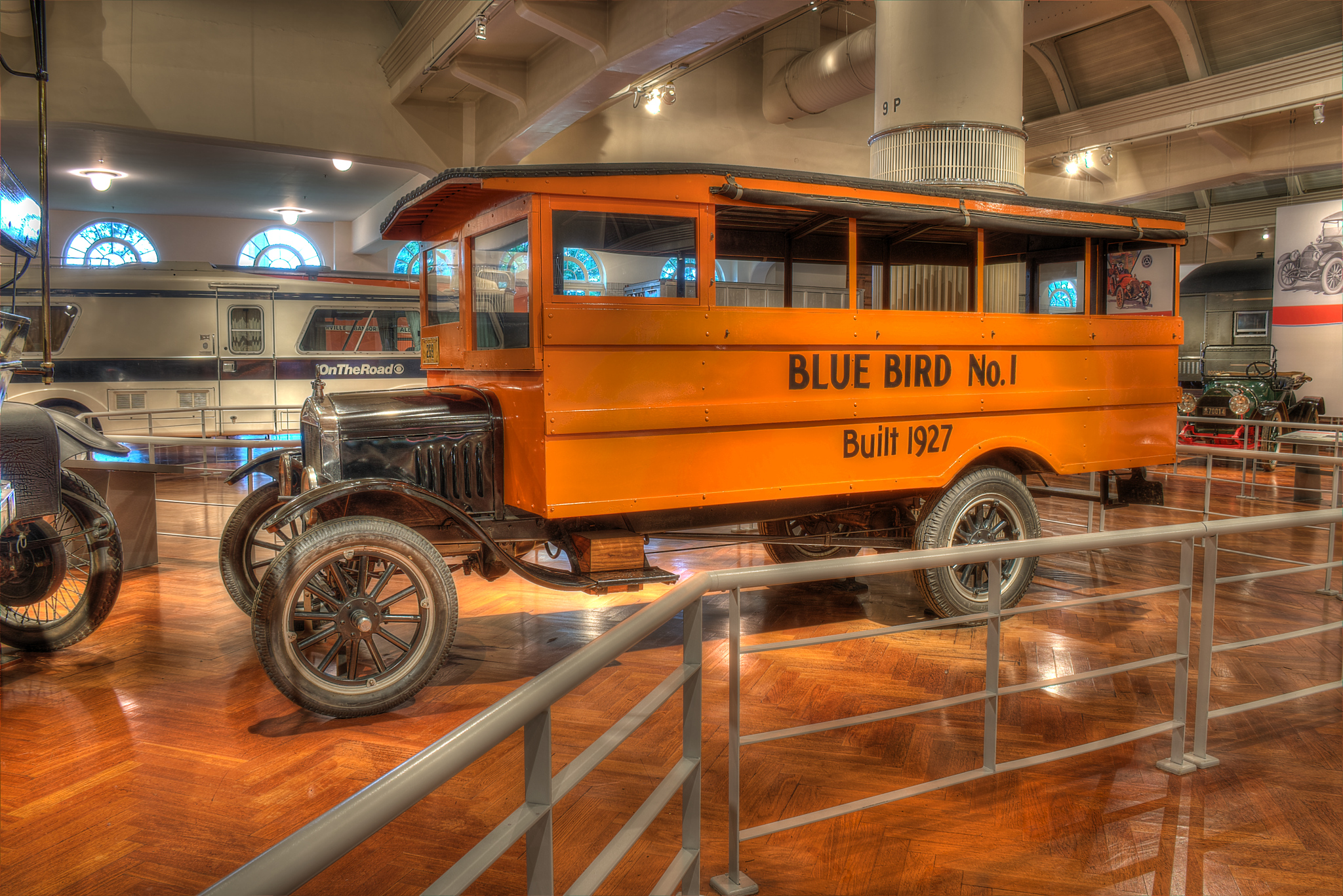
"Blue Bird Number 1", built on a 1927 Ford Model TT chassis. Donated to The Henry Ford Museum in 2008.

Completed in 1927, the first bus completed by A.L. Luce was sold to a customer and put into use as a school bus. Following the establishment of Blue Bird Body Company in 1932, the bus became retroactively known as Blue Bird "Number One". In 1946, the bus was reacquired by the Luce family; as part of the restoration, the body was placed on a Ford Model TT chassis, undergoing a second restoration in the 1970s.

In 2008, Blue Bird "Number One" was donated to the Henry Ford Museum, marking the 100th anniversary of the Model T Ford and the 80th anniversary of its construction.

Alongside the 1948 Blue Bird All American, a replica of Blue Bird Number One sits on the Blue Bird factory floor in Fort Valley.

=== 1940s ===
By the 1940s, the demand for school buses expanded the presence of Blue Bird from rural Georgia to multiple states across the Southern United States. Following World War II, several changes across the country further created a need for school buses. In all but the most remote rural communities, centralized schools (with the graded class structure of urban schools) had succeeded one-room schoolhouses. In metropolitan areas, urban populations began to move into suburbs. Depending on location, the practice of walking to school had become increasingly impractical (particularly as students progressed into high school). At the end of the decade, the baby-boom generation began their education, having an impact across the education system for the next 30 years.

Near the end of 1945, the company suffered a major setback, as its Fort Valley factory was destroyed by fire (nearly claiming the life of A.L. Luce). While the factory building was burned to the ground, a significant amount of equipment was salvaged along with a number of buses on the assembly line. Production was restarted on a makeshift assembly line on other company property, with some work completed under tents. The Fort Valley factory was rebuilt by the spring of 1946, following several challenges; while building materials themselves were no longer rationed, the ability to secure large quantities of beams, trusses, and sheetmetal remained a formidable task.

Following a 1946 heart attack, A.L. Luce began to hand over day-to-day operations of Blue Bird to his three sons. By the end of the decade, the company became the seventh-largest school bus manufacturer in the United States.

==== World War II production ====
Following the outbreak of World War II, school bus production went on hiatus; Blue Bird produced buses for the U.S. Navy. As steel was heavily rationed, company engineers were required to re-engineer the body designs, using wood as part of the body structure.

Alongside its buses for the Navy, Blue Bird also produced ambulance buses. Intended for mass evacuations, the vehicles were fitted with four stretchers.

==== All American ====
In 1948, on a trip to Europe, A.L. Luce and his son George attended the 1948 Paris Auto Show. After viewing a GM-chassis forward-control bus on display, Luce sought to buy a similar bus chassis to produce with a Blue Bird body. Unable to secure a chassis, Luce instead purchased the display vehicle, importing it to the United States.

After reverse-engineering the chassis design (to modify American-produced vehicles), Blue Bird completed its first forward-control prototype in 1949, naming it the All American. In 1950, the All American entered full-scale production. For 1952, Blue Bird became the first school bus manufacturer to produce its own chassis (rather than from outside suppliers). With the exception of the van-based Micro Bird, Blue Bird builds the chassis of each bus its produces.

Currently in its sixth generation, the Blue Bird All American is the longest-running bus model line. While not the first forward-control school bus (the Crown Supercoach was introduced in 1932), the All American would become one of the designs to widely expand its use, leading its wider use by school districts and school bus operators throughout the United States and Canada. Along with the Blue Bird Conventional (and the later Blue Bird Vision), many Blue Bird body designs would share design elements with the All American, including the TC/2000, TC/1000, APC and CS commercial buses, and Wanderlodge recreational vehicle.

=== 1950s ===
In 1950, A.L. Luce retired from daily operations of Blue Bird, with operations of the company handled by his three sons; A.L. "Buddy" Luce Jr. became company president and general manager; George Luce oversaw engineering and Joseph Luce overseeing production and assembly. The same year, the company began assembly of a second product line, as the All American entered full-scale production. In an effort to guarantee year-round demand, Blue Bird turned to exports for its buses, entering Central America and South America.

During the late 1950s, several changes were made to the body design of Blue Bird buses. In 1957, the body underwent a complete redesign, including a higher roofline and flatter body sides; with several revisions, the current Blue Bird Vision and All American continue to use this body. As an option, a "high-headroom" body was introduced, raising interior height to 77 inches.

=== 1960s ===
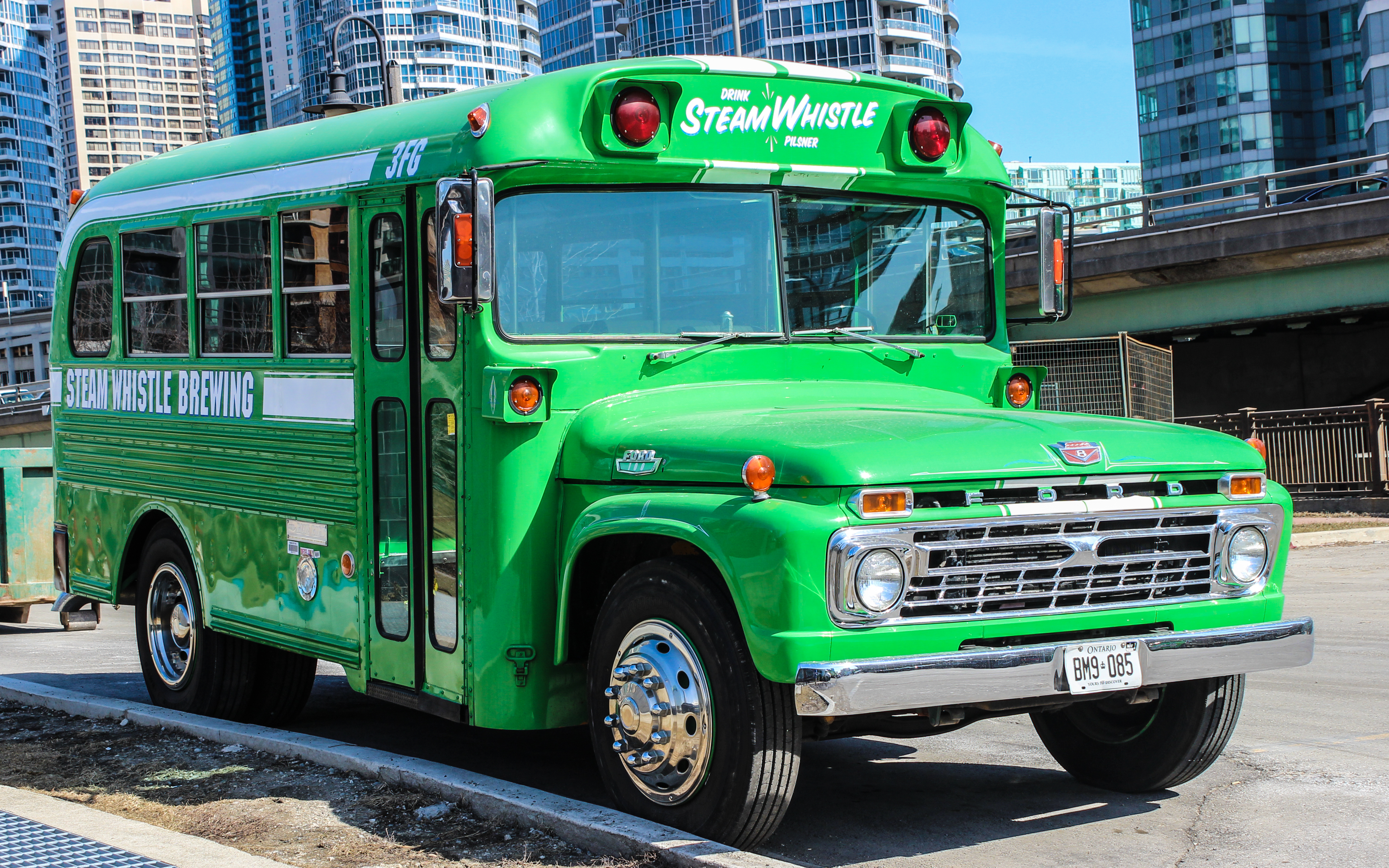
Early 1960s Blue Bird/Ford B500 school bus (converted to a party bus by Steam Whistle Brewing)

At the beginning of the 1960s, Blue Bird stood as the fourth-largest manufacturer of school buses in the United States. To accommodate the added demand, the Luce brothers added several production facilities to supplement the Fort Valley, Georgia plant. In 1958, Blue Bird Canada was opened in Brantford, Ontario. In 1962, Blue Bird Midwest was opened in Mount Pleasant, Iowa.

At the beginning of the decade, Blue Bird introduced its roofline brand emblem, becoming the first bus manufacturer to do so. In 1962, Blue Bird introduced a panoramic windshield design, used on the All American through 2013 (and still on use on the Vision). In the early 1960s, Blue Bird introduced its long-running company slogan: "Your Children's Safety is Our Business", appearing in company advertising (and inside bus bodies) into the 1990s.

Company founder A.L. Luce died in 1962. Shortly after, the three Luce sons sought to diversify the company product line, fearing that demand for school bus production would eventually recede; while the baby boom generation affected student populations, the generation (as a whole) would complete high school shortly after 1980.

In 1965, the company launched bus assembly outside of North America for the first time, opening Blue Bird Central America in Guatemala. While assembling the bodies of the Conventional and All American, Blue Bird Central America lowered production and maintenance costs by using locally sourced chassis (from Mercedes-Benz, Hino, Nissan Diesel, and Toyota) in place of sharing components from the United States.

==== Wanderlodge ====
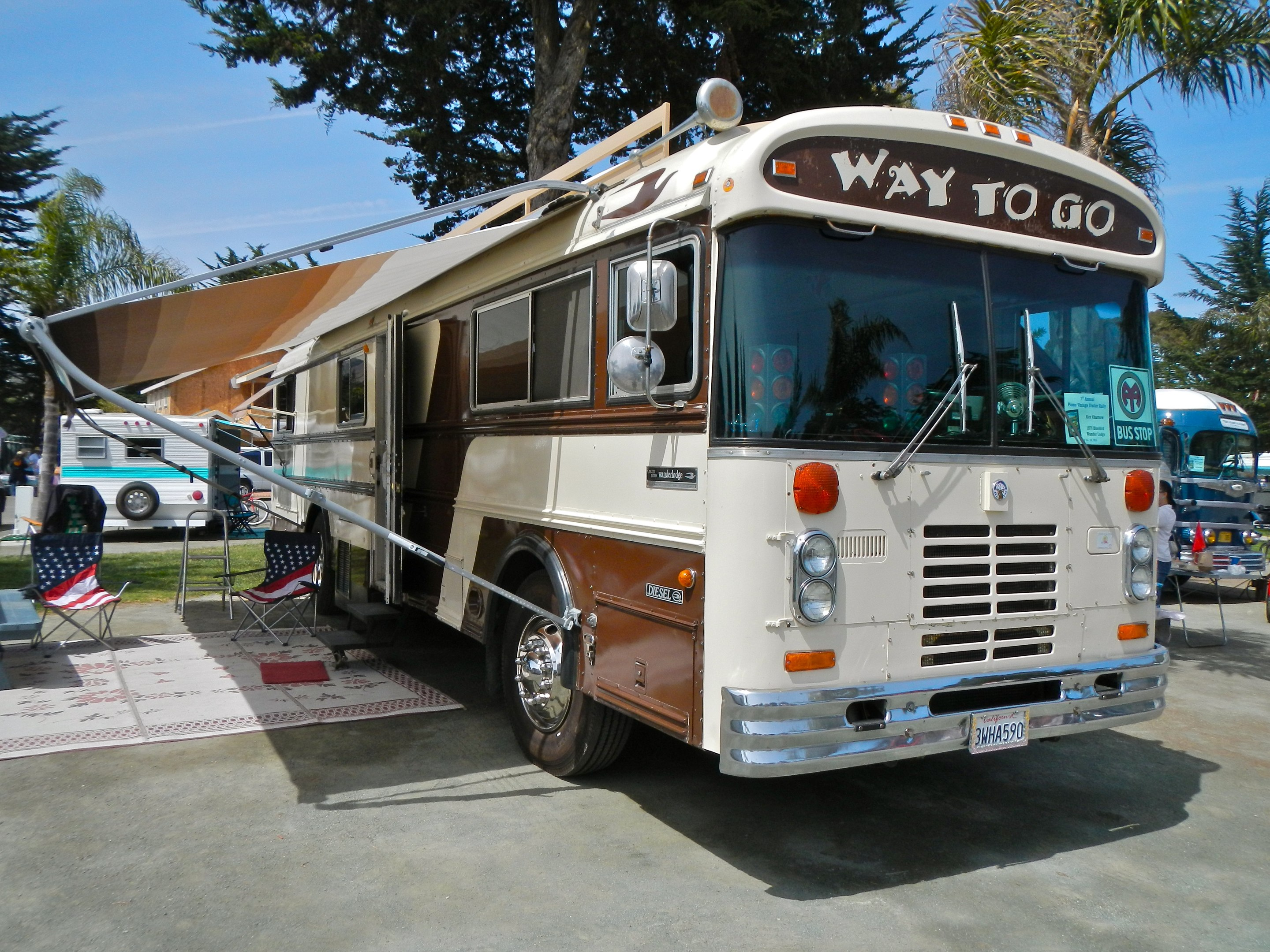
1979 Blue Bird Wanderlodge

In 1963, the first major Blue Bird venture outside of school buses made its debut. Named the Blue Bird Transit Home (re-branded as Wanderlodge in 1968), it was a $12,000 luxury recreational vehicle based on the All American type. Using the heavy-duty frame and all-steel body to its advantage, the vehicle was marketed as higher-quality than other RVs of the time; the interior was largely built to order. For over 25 years of production, the Wanderlodge developed a loyal customer base, including celebrities and heads of state among their owners.

=== 1970s ===
In the 1970s, Blue Bird further diversified its product line, entering the transit bus segment. In 1976, the City Bird was introduced as a rear-engine variant of the All American developed for smaller mass-transit routes.

During the decade, the design of small school buses evolved into a dedicated vehicle (away from adaptations of automobiles). While designs based on cutaway vans were not invented by the company, the 1975 Micro Bird introduced several key features retained by van-based buses today. Along with a full-height entry door, the Micro Bird added windows forward of the entry door (to aid loading-zone visibility). The 1977 Mini Bird used the chassis of the GM P30 stepvan; slightly larger than the Micro Bird, the model line shared the body width of the full-size Conventional and All American.

During the 1970s, Blue Bird introduced the "Handy Bus" option package. Available on any model line from the Micro Bird to the All American, the Handy Bus option featured a wheelchair lift and side door and onboard wheelchair accommodations.

=== 1980s ===
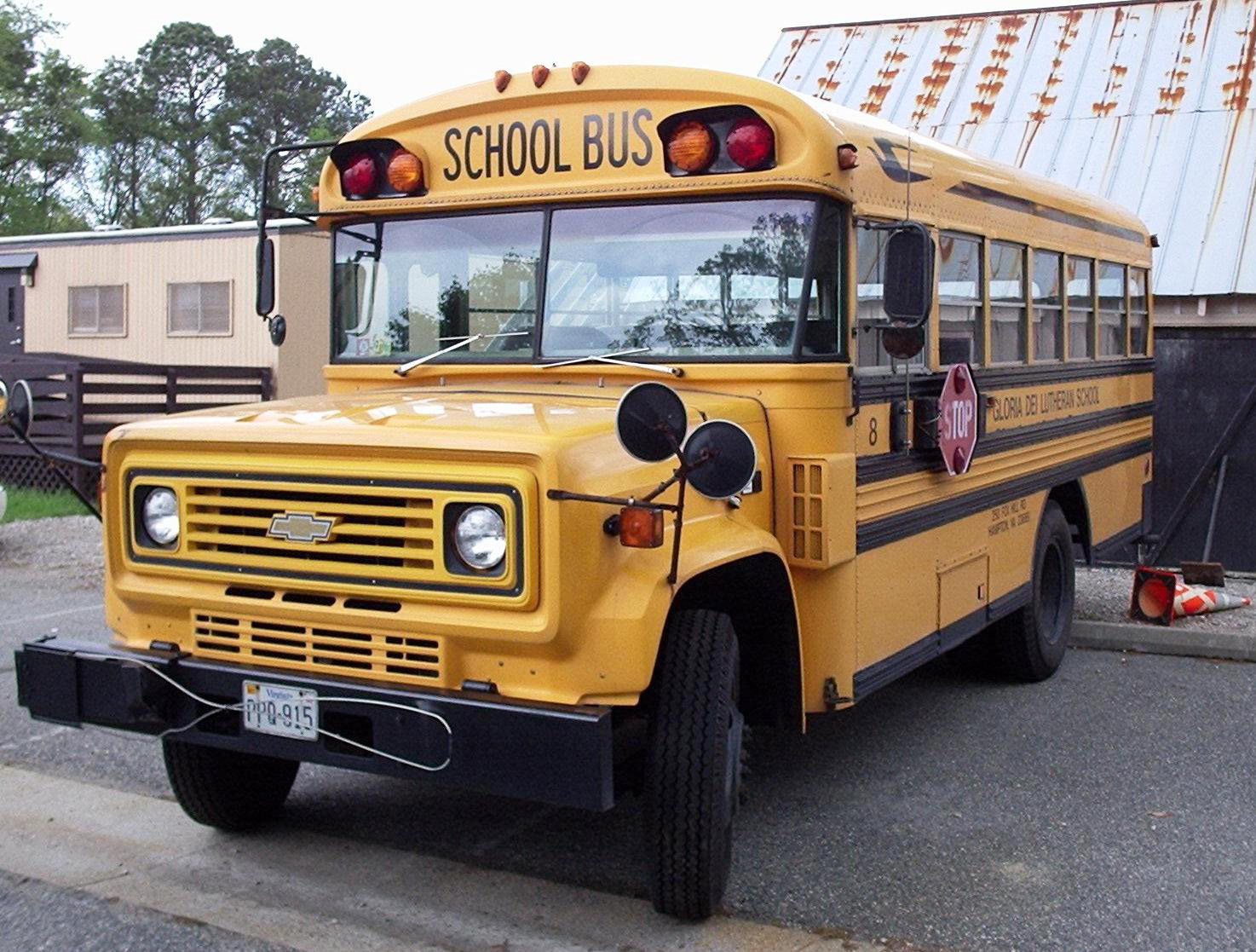
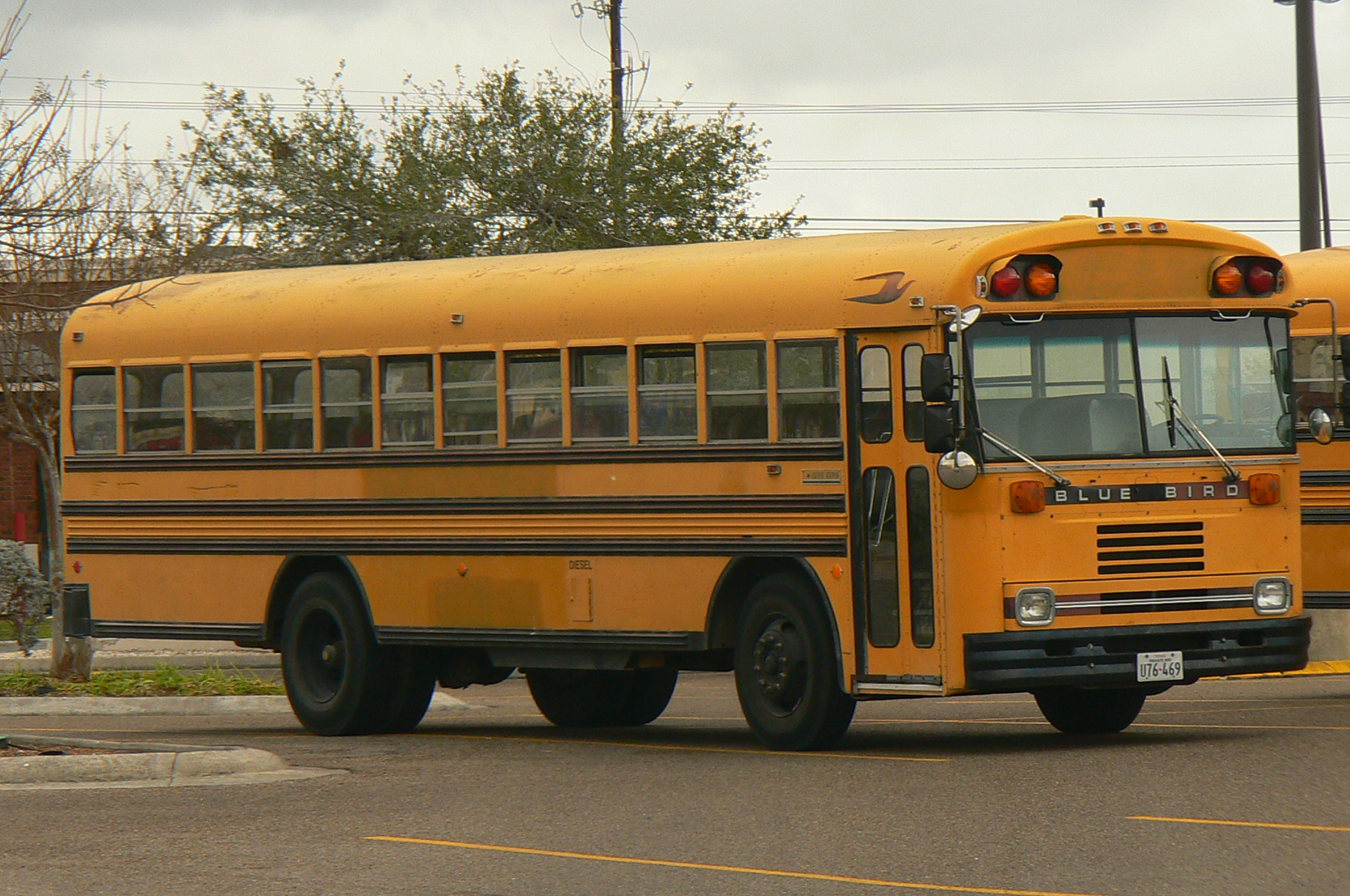
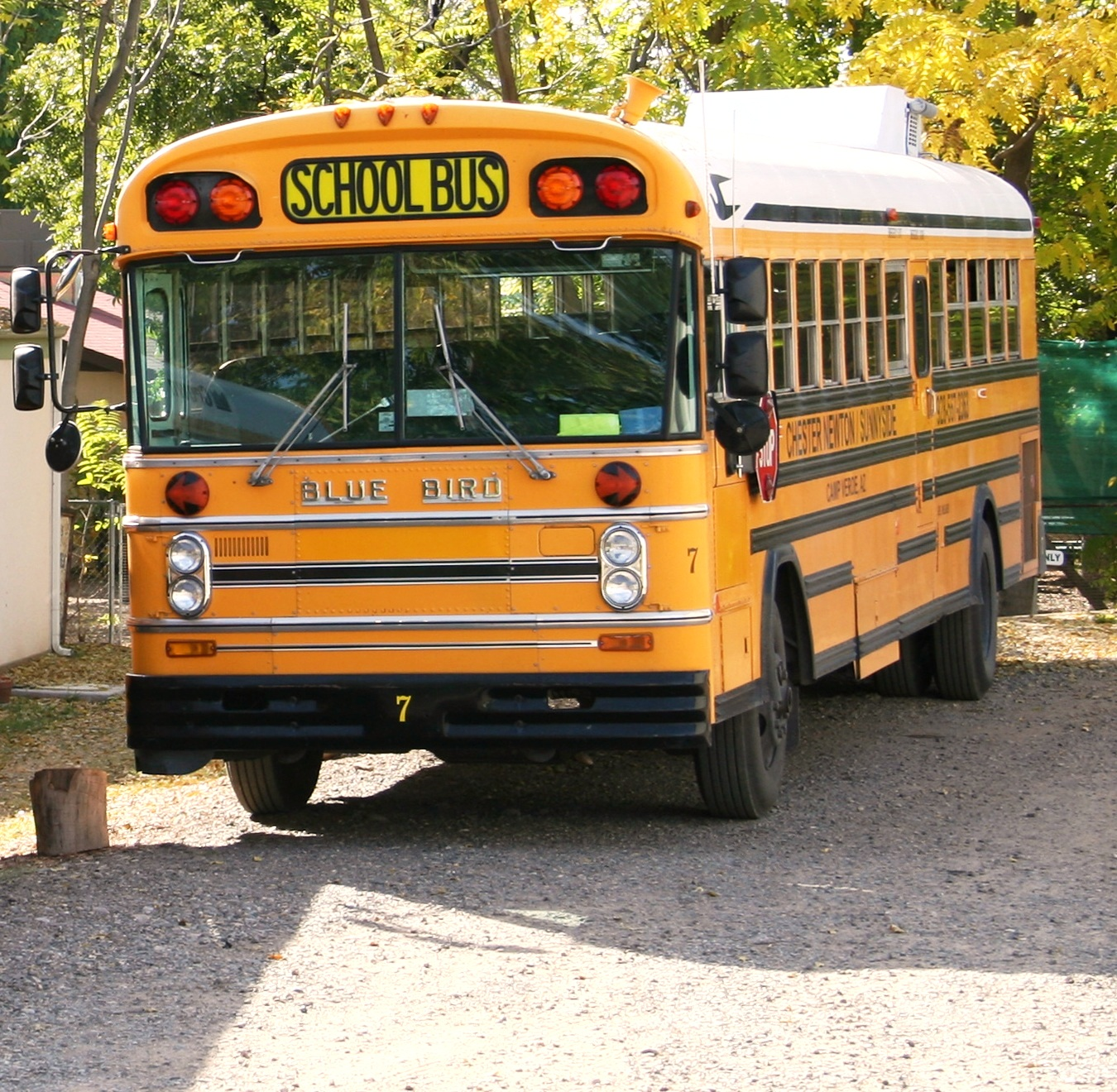
Clockwise from top left: late 1980s Blue Bird/Chevrolet, mid-1980s Blue Bird/International, late 1980s Blue Bird All American RE, 1988-1989 Blue Bird TC/2000

By 1980, Blue Bird would become the highest-volume school bus manufacturer in the United States, with over 20 times the yearly sales of only two decades prior. Despite the added presence of the company, as an entire industry, school bus manufacturing was in turmoil due to several factors. While the volatile economy of the time was impossible to foresee, many of the early 1960s predictions of the Luce brothers had largely come true. By the early 1980s, the baby-boom generation had completed its secondary education, leveling off student population growth. No longer provided with a supplemental source of demand, the manufacturing segment was becoming saturated by the end of the 1970s. From 1979 to 1982, three of the six largest school bus manufacturers—Carpenter, Superior, and Ward—would file for bankruptcy.

To preserve sales, Blue Bird began the use of financing for bus acquisitions in 1984. The unprecedented strategy proved successful, with sales increasing further in the mid-1980s; as the highest-selling bus manufacturer, nearly one out of every three new school buses was a Blue Bird.

While the 1980s would prove successful for Blue Bird in school bus production, the company saw mixed results in other segments. After 10 years of weak sales, the Blue Bird City Bird was discontinued in 1986. Despite volatile sales in recreational vehicles, the Wanderlodge remained successful, accounting for nearly one in five Blue Bird vehicles sold. To better compete with more modern designs, Blue Bird began to differentiate the Wanderlodge from the All American school bus with several exterior restylings in the late 1980s. In 1988 a 102 inches (259.1 centimeters) wide version of the Wanderlodge was introduced—wider than the school bus bodies. The final Wanderlodge to share a body and chassis with the All American was produced in 1990.

During the end of the 1980s, the Blue Bird product line saw several changes. While the All American had been offered in a rear-engine configuration since 1961, a version with a company-sourced chassis was first introduced in 1988. Introduced in late 1987, the TC/2000 (see below) became the first new full-size Blue Bird bus in nearly 30 years. As a running change during 1989 production, Blue Bird introduced a new generation of the All American (redesigned for the first time since 1957). Alongside a redesigned drivers' compartment, the All American received a new set of engine offerings.

==== Management changes ====
From its founding in 1932 until the middle of the 1980s, the operations of Blue Bird were overseen either by A.L. Luce or his three sons. In 1984, the board of directors was expanded outside of the family for the first time; in 1986, the company hired Paul Glaske, president of Marathon LeTourneau (a Texas-based heavy equipment manufacturer). Glaske oversaw day-to-day operations of the company, while the sons of Buddy and Joseph Luce worked elsewhere in company management.

==== TC/2000 ====
In 1987, Blue Bird introduced the TC/2000, adding a second transit-style school bus product line. Developed as a competitor to the Wayne Lifestar, the model was marketed to secure purchases from operators of large bus fleets, priced closely to conventional-style buses.

In line with the Blue Bird All American, the TC/2000 was manufactured with a Blue Bird-produced chassis; initially produced only as a front-engine bus, a rear-engine configuration was introduced in 1991. To reduce manufacturing costs, the model line was offered with a single diesel engine and automatic transmission configuration and a simplified drivers' compartment.

The TC/2000 achieved success in its market segment; by 1990, nearly one in ten new school buses sold in the United States was a TC/2000.

=== 1990s ===
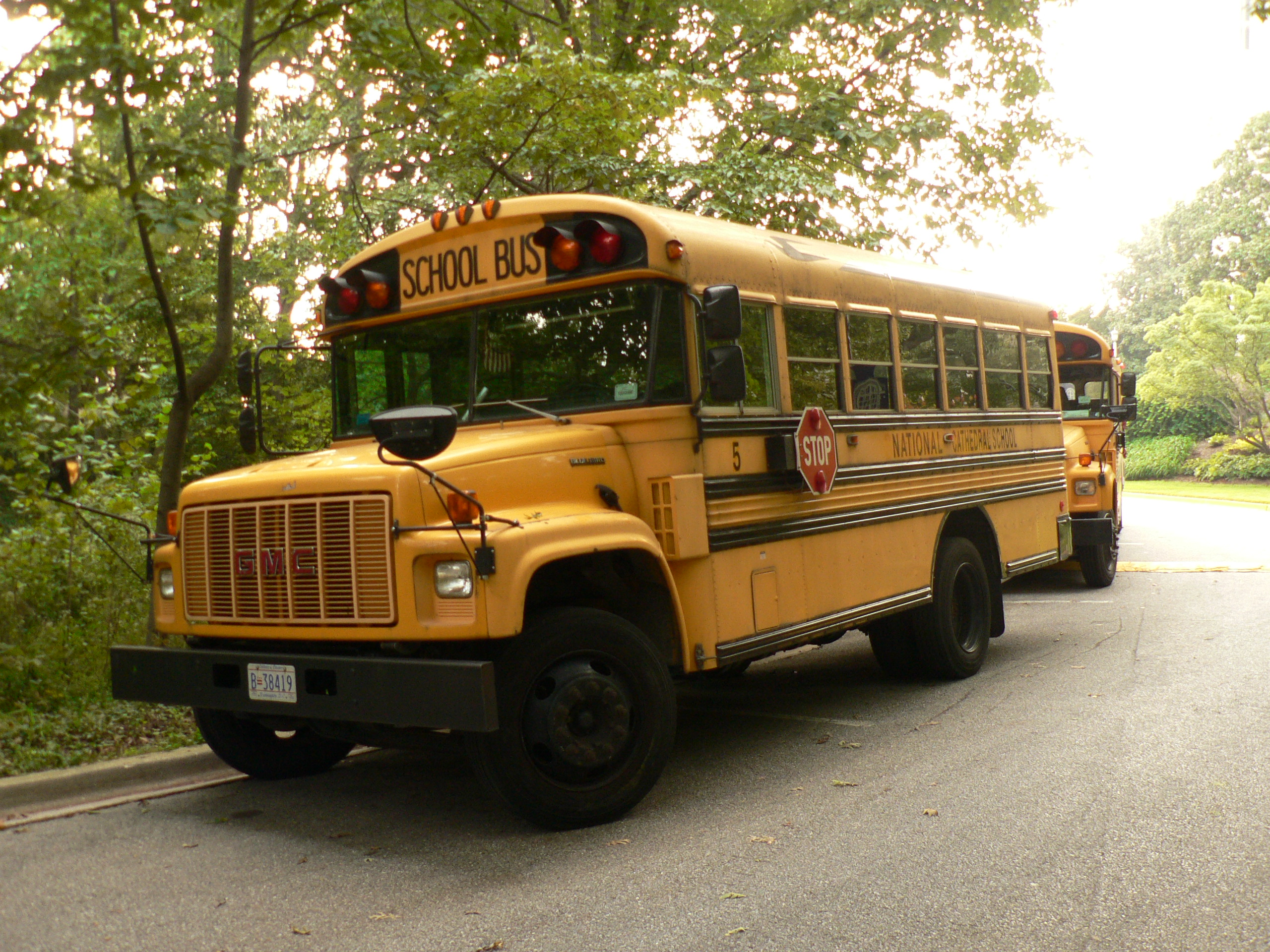
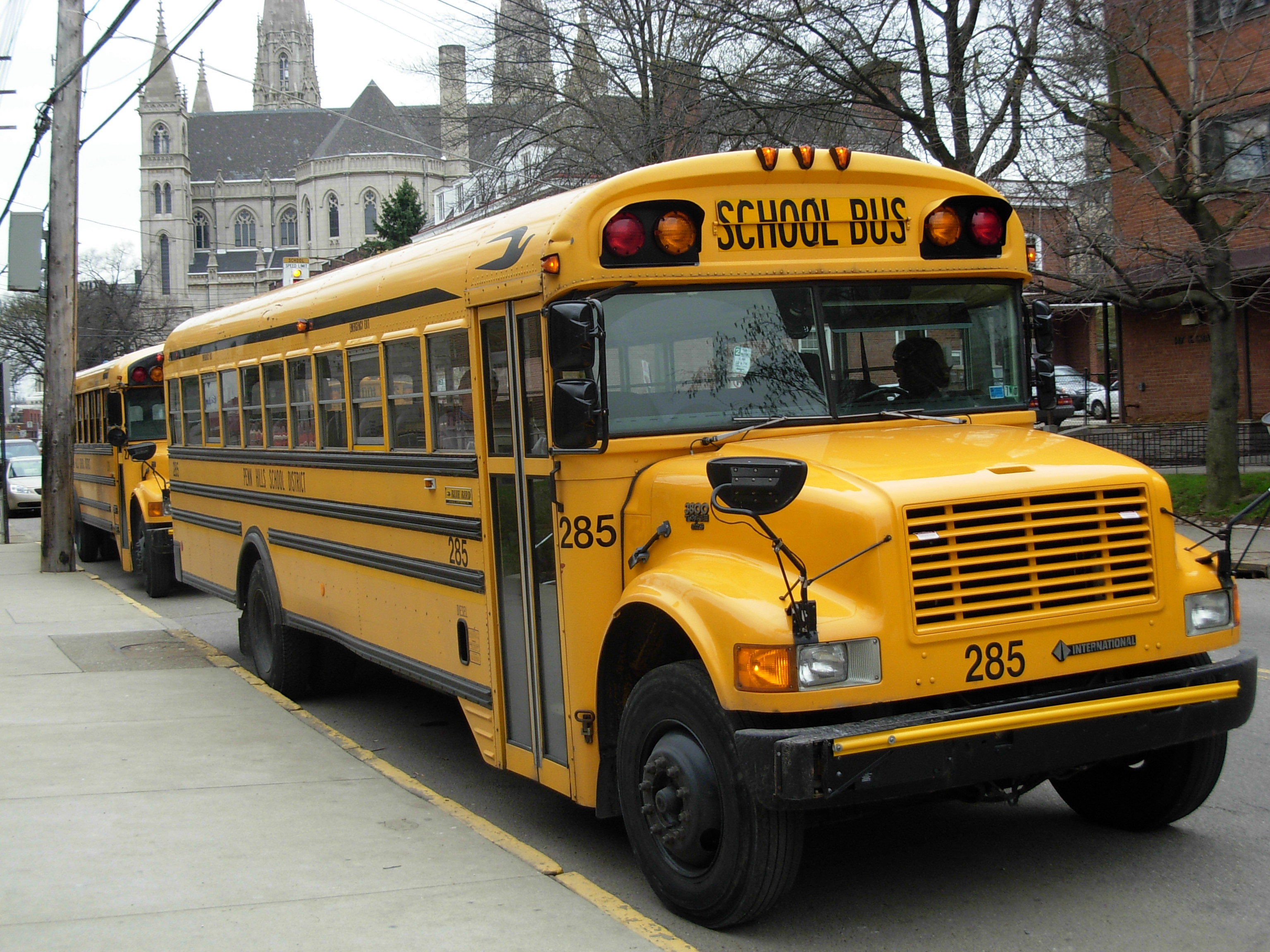
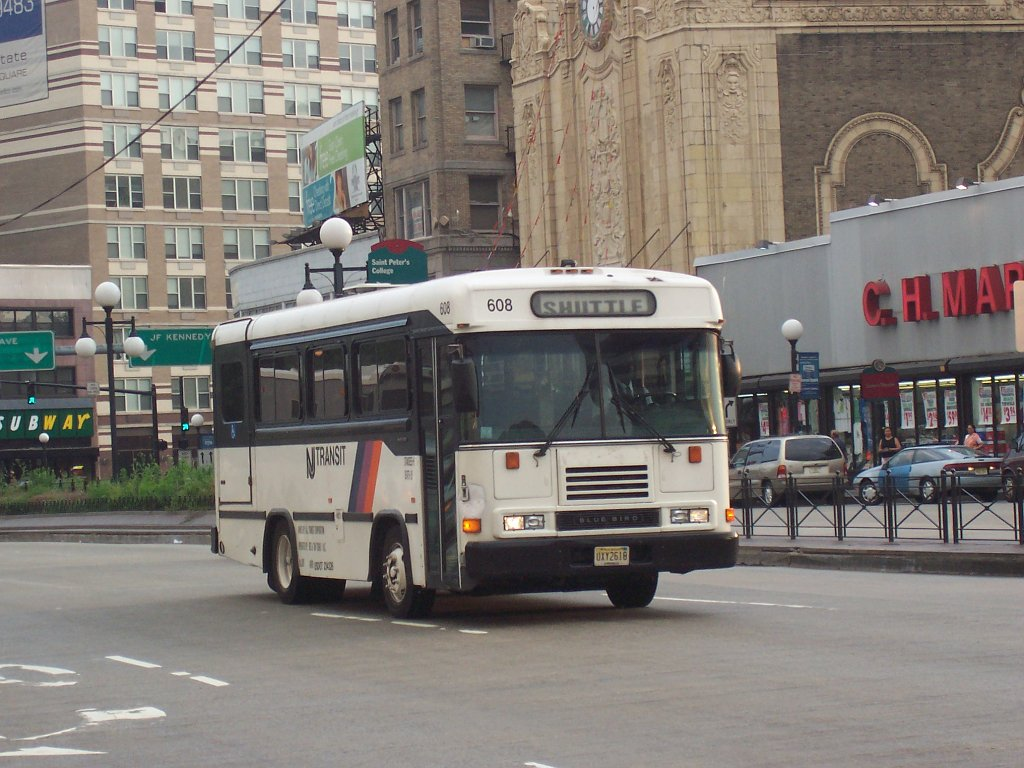
Clockwise from left: Blue Bird/GMC CV200, Blue Bird/International, Blue Bird/Freightliner, Blue Bird TC/2000 RE, Blue Bird CSFE3000, Blue Bird Micro Bird/GMC, Blue Bird All American RE

At the beginning of the 1990s, Blue Bird had secured its position as the highest-volume school bus manufacturer; following the launch of the TC/2000, the company held nearly a 50% market share. After nearly six decades as a family-run company, in 1991, the Luce family decided to put Blue Bird Body Company up for sale. After showing the company to potential buyers through much of 1991, six buyers offered bids. For $397 million, Merrill Lynch Capital Partners purchased an 82% share of Blue Bird in November 1991, changing the name from Blue Bird Body Company to Blue Bird Corporation. Under the terms of the sale, the remaining 18% of the company was equally distributed between Paul Glaske and 14 management employees selected by the Luce family; Buddy and Joseph Luce retired while the rest of the management team was retained.

During the early 1990s, following the success of its school bus product lines, Blue Bird commenced efforts to further diversify its product lines. As a replacement for the City Bird, in 1992, Blue Bird launched the Blue Bird Q-Bus, designed for mass-transit and charter applications. In contrast to the City Bird, the Q-Bus shared no design commonality with a Blue Bird school bus. In addition to the Q-Bus, the APC (All-Purpose Coach) and CS (Commercial Series) were introduced, as commercial buses based on the bodies of the All American and TC/2000; a "shell" version was sold for upfitters as well.

To better compete with more modern designs of luxury recreational vehicles, Blue Bird began to update the design of the Wanderlodge. Following the 1988 introduction of the 102" wide body, the Wanderlodge line was redesigned entirely for 1991 (effectively sharing only Blue Bird emblems with the All American). In 1994, a second version of the Wanderlodge was introduced, as the Wanderlodge BMC debuted. To expand its availability, the Wanderlodge BMC was produced using a chassis from Spartan Motors; a Blue Bird QMC commercial variant was introduced, designed as a mobile workstation. In 1997, Blue Bird expanded into the passenger motorcoach segment, introducing the LTC-40 (Luxury Touring Coach); for 1998, the Wanderlodge LX/LXi were introduced, adapting the LTC body.

In an effort to match demand for its product lines, Blue Bird made several changes to its production facilities, closing Blue Bird East in (in Virginia) in 1992 and opening Blue Bird de Mexico (in Monterrey, Nuevo León) in 1995.

After few major changes to its school bus product lines through the 1990s, in 1999, the Blue Bird All American underwent its second redesign in 10 years. In order to increase forward visibility, the All American was given an all-new chassis (positioning the engine lower), adopting the larger windshield of the TC/2000, and redesigned dashboard and control panels (later used in the TC/2000).

During the late 1990s, Blue Bird Corporation would undergo the first of several ownership changes. After increasing sales each year throughout the second half of the 1990s, Blue Bird was acquired from Merrill Lynch Capital Partners by Henlys Group PLC for $428 million (with Henlys also paying $237 million of Blue Bird company debt). At the time, Henlys sought to expand its operations in North America, with 10% of the company owned by Volvo Group.

==== Joint ventures ====
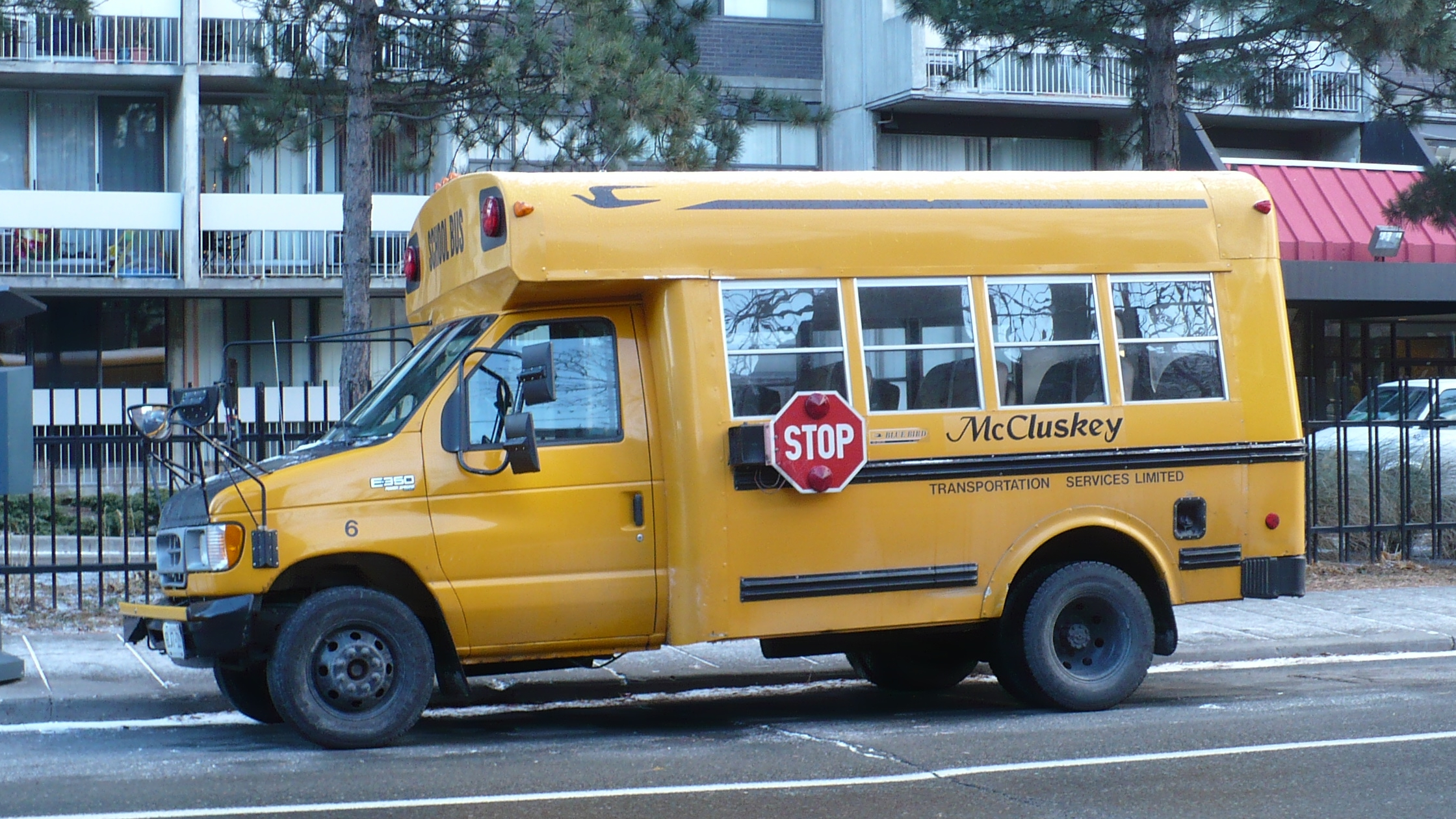
Blue Bird/ MB-IV – a Girardin body on a Ford E-350 DRW chassis

During the 1990s, Blue Bird would enter into several joint ventures as part of its school bus production, for both small and full-size school buses.

In an effort to supplement the Blue Bird Micro Bird, in 1992, Blue Bird entered into a supply agreement with Quebec-based bus manufacturer Girardin Minibus to supply Blue Birds with Girardin-produced MB-II/MB-IV school buses (branded as Blue Birds) on cutaway van chassis. While configured similar to the Micro Bird, the Blue Bird MB-II/IV by Girardin allowed Blue Bird to offer an updated body design; at the time, Girardin was the sole manufacturer to produce a full cutaway body for single rear-wheel van chassis. The MB-II and MB-IV were sold by Blue Bird until 1999, when they adopted the Girardin branding.

Coinciding with the 1991 redesign of the General Motors medium-duty truck line, General Motors entered into a 10-year supply agreement with Blue Bird, starting early in 1992, as a 1993 model. Under the agreement, the Chevrolet/GMC B7 would only be sold to Blue Bird. Blue Bird offered a choice of other cowled chassis (Ford B700/B800, International 3700, 3800, and later Freightliner FS-65). The CV200 was produced through 2002. The 2002s were considered 2003 models.

==== Environmentally friendly buses ====
In place of bringing all-new product lines to production, during the 1990s, Blue Bird explored several methods of reducing the environmental impact of school buses, with several methods reaching production. In 1991, Blue Bird developed the first school bus powered by compressed natural gas (CNG), an All American Rear Engine. In 1995, Blue Bird began a collaboration with John Deere to produce school buses with CNG engines, lasting into the 2000s; along with the All American, CNG engines were produced for the TC/2000.

In 1996, Blue Bird debuted the Envirobus 2000 concept school bus. Derived loosely from the Q-Bus, the Envirobus served loosely as a testbed for safety-related technology along with the viability of CNG-powered school buses.

Along with alternative-fuel buses, Blue Bird became the first school bus manufacturer to develop fully electric school buses; during the 1990s, technology limited its development to the prototype stage. In 1994, the company developed a battery-powered school bus in an effort with Westinghouse Electronic Systems for a school district in California. In 1996, Blue Bird collaborated with Electrosource, Inc in an effort to design a battery system intended for buses.

=== 2000s ===
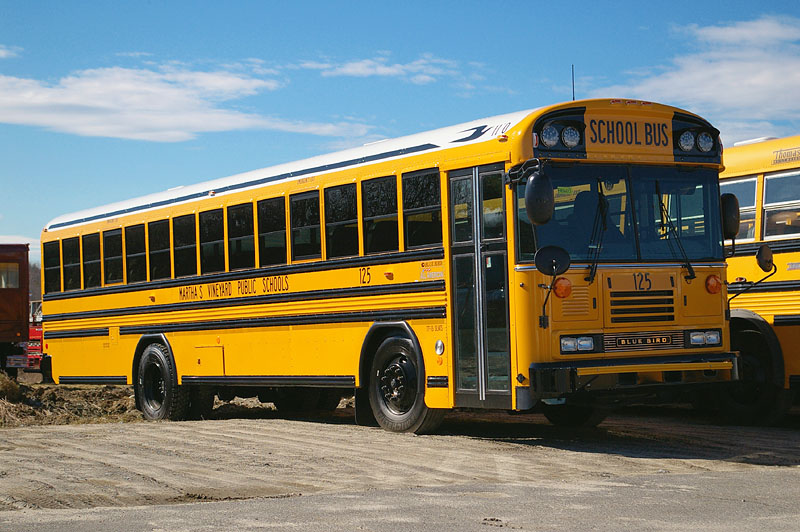
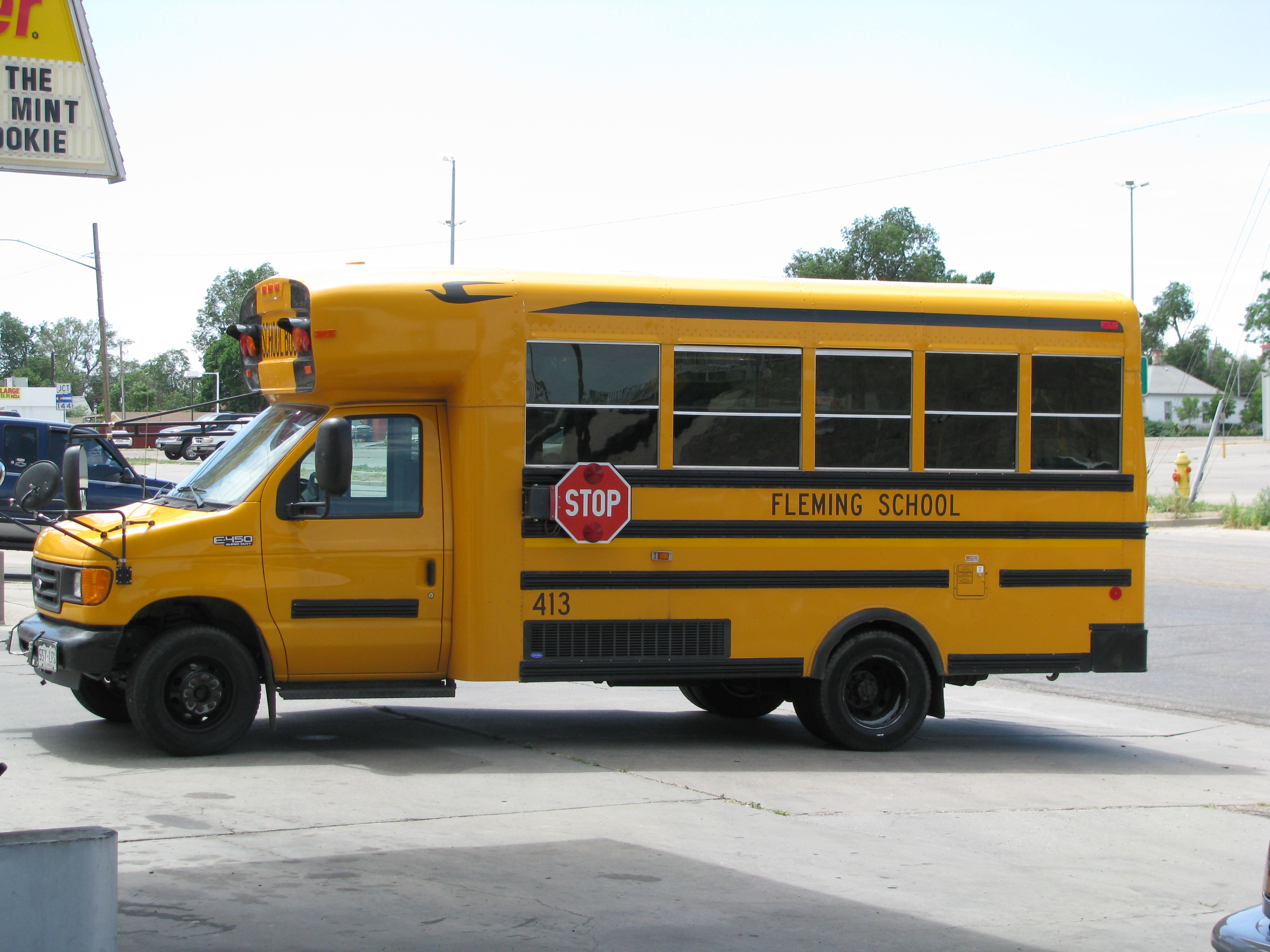
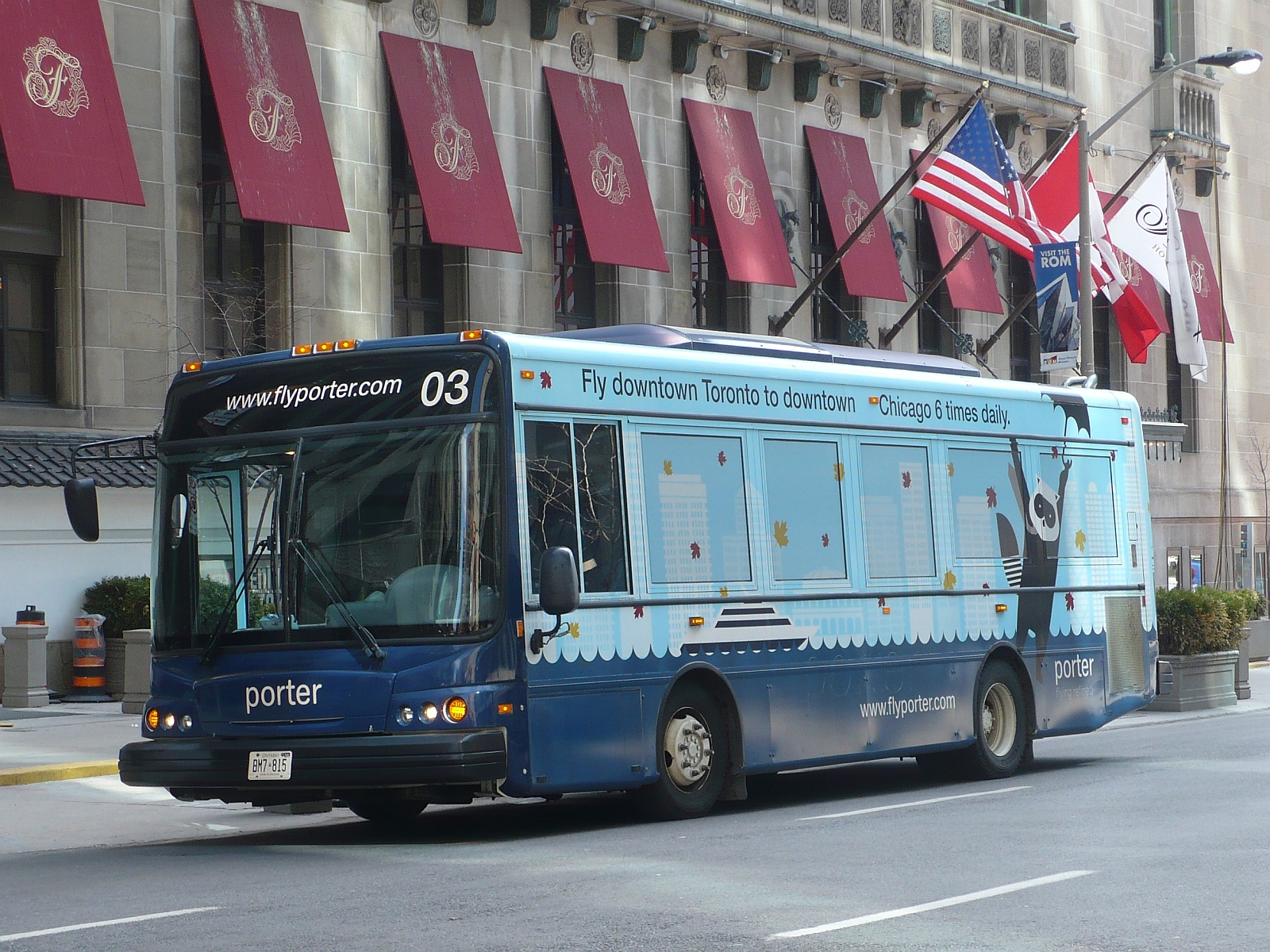
Clockwise from left: Blue Bird SBCV, Blue Bird Vision, Blue Bird All American FE, Blue Bird UltraLF, Blue Bird Micro Bird/Ford E450, Blue Bird All American RE

While the late 1990s were calmer than the late 1970s for the school bus industry, it still remained a time of relative turmoil for school bus manufacturers; this would carry into the 2000s. Several school bus manufacturers underwent acquisition or changed hands (AmTran and Thomas Built Buses); by 2001, several others (Crown Coach, Carpenter, Gillig, Wayne) would end school bus production forever. Instead of being family-run companies, school bus manufacturers were now owned by larger companies with ties to truck manufacturing. For Blue Bird, a large stake of the company was owned by the Volvo Group, the largest bus manufacturer in the world. However, during the early 2000s, due to financial difficulties of its other parent company, Blue Bird was sold from Henlys in 2004. In 2006, Blue Bird was acquired through a bankruptcy filing by Cerberus Capital Management. Looking to develop its entries in the transportation sector, Blue Bird was paired with North American Bus Industries (NABI) and Optima Bus Corporation by Cerberus.

At the beginning of the 2000s, Blue Bird sought to modernize its aging transit bus line; the Q-Bus was nearly a decade old and the CS and APC coaches were essentially commercial versions of the All American and TC/2000 school buses. For 2002, the 96-inch wide Q-Bus was replaced by the 102-inch wide Xcel102 and the CS and APC lines were retired. In 2003, the company entered the low-floor segment with the introduction of the UltraLF and UltraLMB.

As the number of full-size school bus manufacturers had been cut from seven to three from 1990 to 2000, Blue Bird began on making its school bus products more competitive during the early part of the decade. Following the substantial update of the All American in 1999, Blue Bird discontinued the slow-selling TC/1000 in 1999 and consolidated the TC/2000 with the All American early in 2004.

However, the largest change came in 2003, as Blue Bird sought to replace the CV200. While initially developed to use the Ford F-650 Super Duty chassis, the Vision underwent a major change before its release. In a major break from precedent, Blue Bird did not use an existing truck manufacturer for the chassis, instead developing its own version from the ground up. While the Vision used the same bus body as the long-running Conventional, engineering changes were made to optimize forward visibility.

As part of its acquisition by Cerberus, Blue Bird gradually saw itself positioned exclusively into yellow school bus production, its largest market. In 2007, the Xcel102 was discontinued and the low-floor UltraLF/LMB product lines were added to NABI. In a controversial move, the rights to the Wanderlodge luxury motorhome were sold to Complete Coach Works; production ended in 2009.

In commemoration of the 80th anniversary of the construction the first Blue Bird bus and the centennial of the Model T Ford, the Luce family donated the restored vehicle to The Henry Ford Museum in 2008. Dubbed "Blue Bird #1", it is the oldest known surviving school bus in the United States.

With resources dedicated solely towards school bus production, the Vision saw a major update for 2008. In addition to a new dashboard, it received a new cowl with larger headlights and grille. For 2009, the company expanded alternative-fuel options as it introduced a propane-fuel variant of the Vision; it was powered by a General Motors 8.1L V8. For 2010, the All American was given a complete update, marking some of the largest changes to the Blue Bird body design in over 50 years; along with a complete redesign of the roof, windshield, and rear entry, the interior received a ground-up redesign.

With the streamlining of bus production, the number of production facilities utilized by the company has been reduced. Blue Bird de Mexico was closed in 2001 and Blue Bird Midwest in Mount Pleasant, Iowa was closed in 2002. In 2010, Blue Bird North Georgia was closed, consolidating all bus production back to company headquarters in Fort Valley.

In October 2009, Blue Bird further streamlined its bus production as it entered into a second joint venture with Canadian school bus manufacturer Girardin Minibus. Dubbed "Micro Bird, Inc.", all small bus production was consolidated at the Girardin facilities in Quebec, Canada; consequently, all Blue Bird production is now limited to full-size conventional and transit buses. The 2010 Micro Bird was the last Blue Bird bus to use a non-Blue Bird chassis.

=== 2010s ===
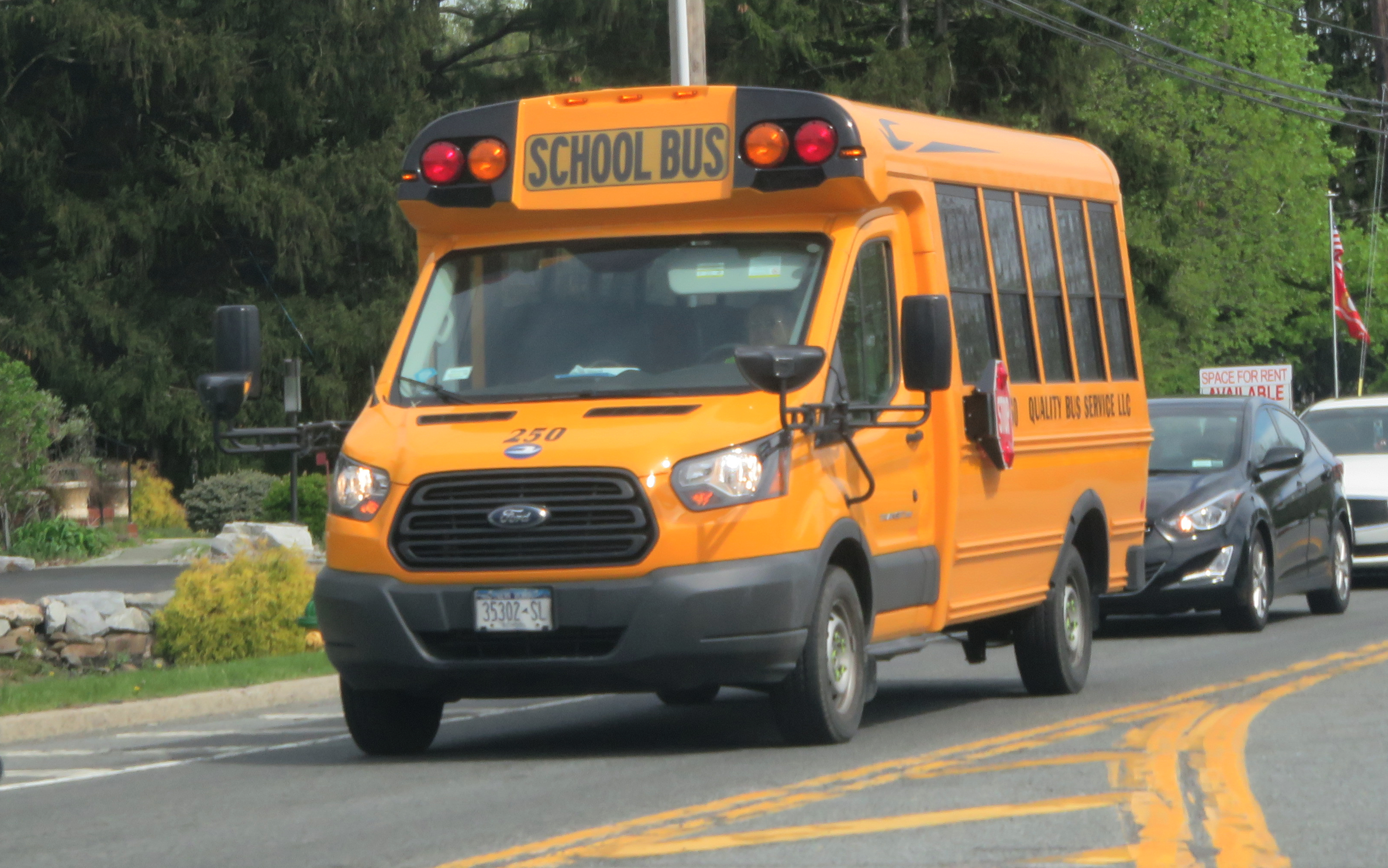
Top to bottom: Blue Bird Vision (first facelift), Blue Bird All American FE (D3), Blue Bird Micro Bird MB-II/Ford, Blue Bird Micro Bird T-Series (Ford Transit 350)

Following the consolidation of Blue Bird production to the Vision and All American school buses (and vehicles derived from them), during the 2010s, a number of changes were phased in. In following with the popularity with the LPG/propane autogas version of the Blue Bird Vision bus, a version powered by a Ford V10 and equipped with a ROUSH CleanTech propane autogas fuel system was introduced in 2011 (as the original General Motors V8 engines were no longer in production); in addition, the Vision received a dashboard and steering column shared with the All American.

In late 2012, Blue Bird unveiled a redesigned 2014 All American series (code-named the T3 Series), which would replace versions introduced in 1999 and 2008 produced concurrently. Distinguished by a redesigned (rounder) roof, the new All American has increased parts commonality with the Vision. In October 2013, the 2015 Vision was introduced. Along with clear-lens headlights and a new grille, propane-fueled versions gained the option of an extended-range 98-gallon fuel tank. Company owner Cerberus Capital sold off the majority of its transportation holdings, including NABI and Optima to Canadian bus builder New Flyer; Blue Bird remained under Cerberus ownership.

In late 2013, Blue Bird entered a different segment of school transportation as it introduced Blue Bird Connect™, a GPS-based fleet management software system co-developed with Synovia Solutions. While designed as an integrated system as an option for any Blue Blue school bus, Blue Bird Connect™ was also intended for retrofit to existing fleets of school buses as well, regardless of brand.

Though produced by Girardin under the Micro Bird joint venture, in late 2014, the company introduced the Micro Bird T-Series, a Girardin-bodied Type A school bus; it is the first school bus body ever produced for the Ford Transit in North America. Largely due to the Ford-derived chassis design, Blue Bird predicts a 20% fuel economy increase over its E-Series MB/G5 counterpart. In 2014, Blue Bird introduced the Sigma, an all-new transit bus. While developed solely for export, the Sigma derived its chassis configuration and drivetrain from the All American.

In September 2014, the ownership of Blue Bird underwent another transition. Texas-based venture capital firm Hennessy Capital Acquisition Corporation purchased a $255 million stake of the company from Cerberus affiliate The Traxis Group. As part of the acquisition, Cerberus/Traxis would retain majority ownership; the Blue Bird leadership team remained in place. Although Cerberus remains the majority owner of Blue Bird with a 58% share of the company, in late February 2015, Blue Bird became the first stand-alone school bus manufacturer to become publicly traded on NASDAQ.

By 2015, Blue Bird ranked as the leading provider of propane autogas powered school buses through a partnership with ROUSH CleanTech, which provides propane autogas fuel systems for the buses. At this time, the Propane Education & Research Council (PERC) estimated that between school districts and private fleets, 11,000 propane school buses had been purchased in the United States.

In September 2015, Blue Bird further expanded its non-diesel fuel offerings as the company introduced a gasoline-fueled variant of the Vision, starting with 2016 production The first gasoline-fueled full-size school bus since the discontinuation of the 2002 Blue Bird CV200, it is powered by the same Ford V10 used by the propane-fueled variant of the Vision. At the end of 2018, Blue Bird produced the 5,000th gasoline-powered version of the Vision.

In January 2017, Blue Bird announced it would begin development of a Zero Emission Vehicle (ZEV) school bus with the Vehicle-to-Grid (V2G) technology. This development work is being supported by a $4.4 million grant from the U.S. Department of Energy, as well as additional support from other entities, bringing together just over $9 million in funds. The project will result in eight ZEV V2G school buses being deployed in California. After unveiling fully electric versions of the Micro Bird G5 and All American in late 2017, Blue Bird delivered its first production electric school buses in September 2018.

=== 2020s ===
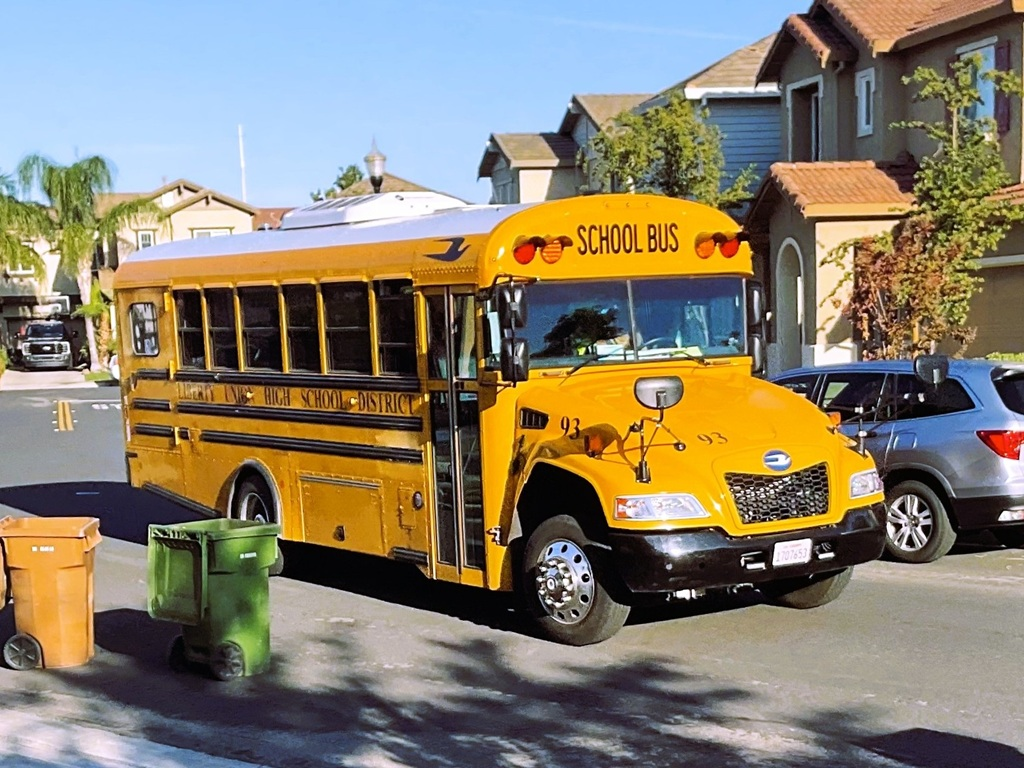
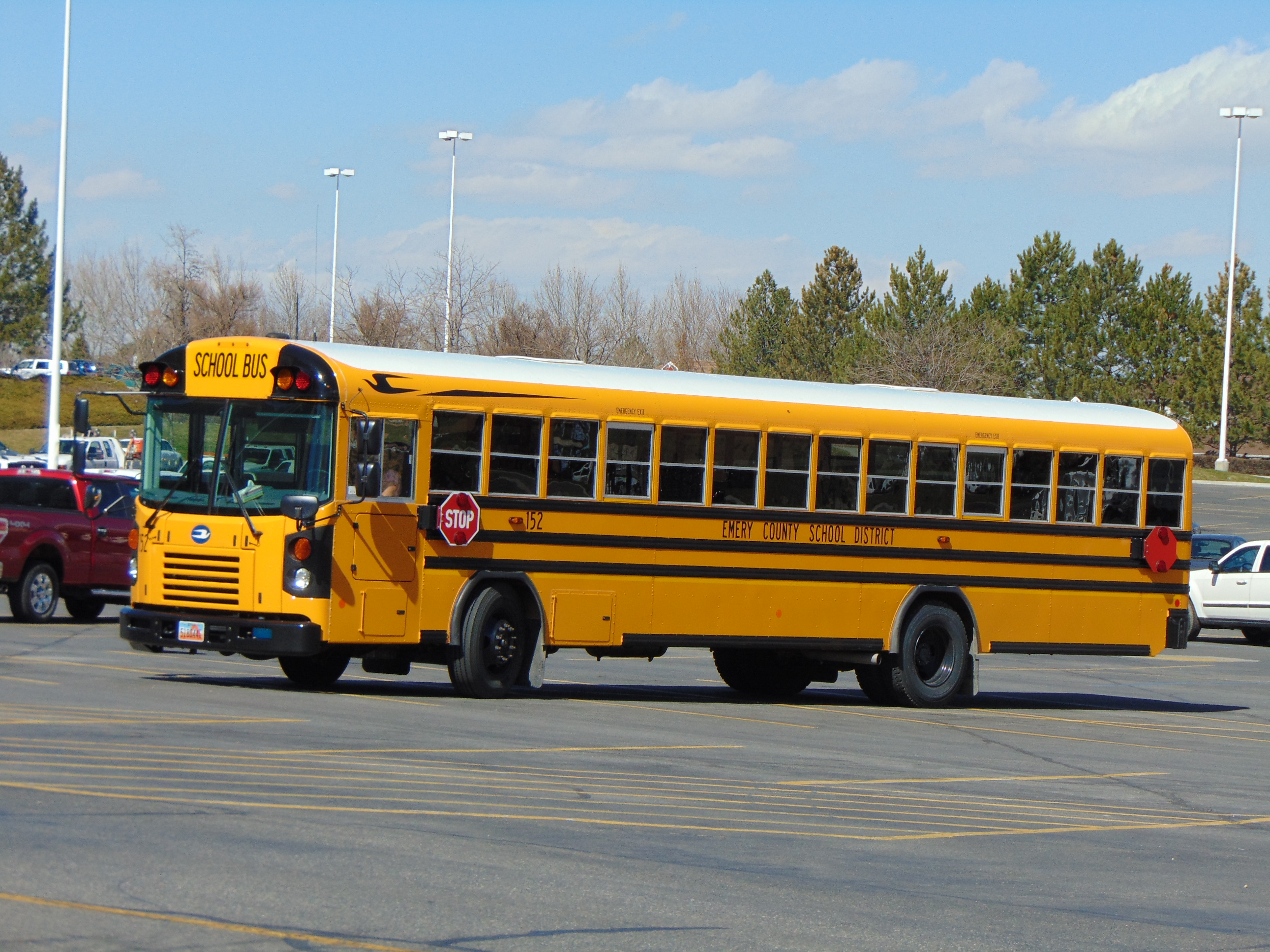
Clockwise from top left: Blue Bird Micro Bird D-Series (commercial bus), Blue Bird Vision (third facelift "Gen 4"), Blue Bird Vision (fourth facelift "Gen 5"), Blue Bird All American RE (T3), Blue Bird All American FE (T3).

In 2022, Blue Bird announced its entry into the commercial vehicle market, debuting a concept for an Class 5-6 EV commercial truck platform. While largely intended for the delivery vehicle market, the chassis was also developed for specialty uses. In 2024, a working prototype was shown, bodied as a delivery van. In 2025, the production-ready EV was shown, with Blue Bird also unveiling a low-emissions variant powered by a propane-fueled 7.3L V8 (sharing its drivetrain with the propane Vision school bus). Currently, the Blue Bird commercial chassis is intended for a mid-2026 release.

In May 2023, workers at Blue Bird's main Fort Valley factory voted in favor of a unionization drive by the United Steelworkers by a 697–435 margin.

In the summer of 2024, the company secured $80 million in matching funds, as the company intends to redevelop the former Wanderlodge manufacturing site in Fort Valley into an all-new facility for electric vehicle manufacturing.

After standardizing 3-point seatbelts across its entire product line in 2024, Blue Bird became the first manufacturer to produce full-size school buses with a steering-wheel airbag, making it standard equipment in the Vision in late 2025.

Early in 2026, the terms of the Micro Bird joint venture underwent major changes, as Blue Bird bought out the 50% share held by Girardin. The $200 million transaction (30% cash, 70% Blue Bird company stock) does not directly affect the current production of the Micro Bird product line.

In August 2026, Blue Bird entered into an agreement with Ford Motor Company to develop and manufacture the successor of the Ford F-53/Ford F-59 stripped chassis (starting in 2028). Under the agreement, the new chassis will be designed and assembled by Blue Bird, with Ford responsible for powertrain development and supply.

== Products ==
In addition to school, activity, and commercial applications, Blue Bird buses have been custom-built for unique applications such as bloodmobiles, mobile libraries, and public safety command centers.

=== School buses ===
Current product line
Model name	Micro Bird by Girardin	Vision	All American (T3)
Photo	A 2011 Blue Bird Micro Bird by Girardin.	2008 Blue Bird Vision	Blue Bird All American T3RE
Year introduced	2010	2003 (Gen 6: 2026)	1948 (T3: 2014)
Assembly	Drummondville, Quebec; Plattsburgh, New York	Fort Valley, Georgia	
Configuration	Type A (cutaway): MB-II: single rear wheel; G5: dual rear wheel; T-Series: single/dual rear wheel	Type C (conventional)	Type D (transit-style): front engine; rear engine
Chassis manufacturer	Ford E-350/E-450 (2010–present); Ford Transit 350/350HD (2015-present); Chevrolet Express/GMC Savana 3500/4500 (2010–present)	Blue Bird cowled chassis (2003-present)	Blue Bird front-engine stripped chassis (T3FE; 2014-present) rear-engine stripped chassis (T3RE; 2014-present)
Fuel type(s)	Gasoline, diesel, propane (LPG), electric	Gasoline, diesel, propane (LPG), Compressed Natural Gas (CNG), electric	Diesel, Compressed Natural Gas (CNG) (discontinued 2024), electric (RE only)
Passenger capacity	10-30	36-77	54-90
Other notes	Introduced for 2011 model year as part of Micro Bird, Inc. joint venture with Girardin.; Replaces Micro Bird; 2015 Micro Bird T-Series is the first Type A school bus based on the Ford Transit cutaway chassis in North America.; Electric Micro Bird G5 on Ford E450 chassis in production since summer 2018	Vision was introduced for the 2004 model year and is currently in its fifth generation (introduced for the 2024 model year).; Vision uses an in-house chassis from Blue Bird.; Vision underwent further upgrades for 2015, 2022, and 2024.; Electric version introduced 2019	Blue Bird has produced the chassis for front-engine versions since 1952, rear engine versions since 1988.; Current version (internally known as T3) introduced for 2014.; Electric version of model line (based on T3RE) in production since 2018.; Known in export markets as the Blue Bird TX3; formerly known as the TC/3000 and All Canadian.; Basis for Blue Bird Sigma (export bus chassis); All-American A3RE was produced up until 2014(A3FE in 2013), it was replaced alongside the D3 with the T3.; CNG variants discontinued in 2024 to focus more on BEV technology

Former product lines
Model name	Production	Vehicle type	Chassis	Notes
Micro Bird	1975–2010	Type A (cutaway)	Ford Motor Company: Ford Econoline/E-Series (1992–2010); General Motors: Chevrolet G-30/GMC Vandura (1975–1996); Chevrolet Express (1997–2010); Chevrolet P-30 (1995–1996)	Replaced with products from Micro Bird, Inc. joint venture with Girardin.; From 1992 to 1999, the Micro Bird was sold alongside Girardin-produced Blue Bird MB-II/MB-IV models.; From 1995 to 1996, a heavy-duty model using the Chevrolet P30 chassis was produced using modified Chevrolet G30 front bodywork.
MB-II/MB-IV	1992–1999	Type A (cutaway): MB-II: single rear wheel; MB-IV: dual rear wheel	Ford Motor Company: Ford Econoline/E-Series (1992–1999); General Motors: Chevrolet G-30/GMC Vandura (1992–1996); Chevrolet Express/GMC Savana (1997–1999)	Introduced in Canada in 1991.; Produced by Canada's Girardin Minibus and distributed in the United States as Blue Bird-brand products; MB-II continues in production and is now sold again as a Blue Bird (Micro Bird by Girardin)
Mini Bird	1977–2002	Type B (integrated)	General Motors: Chevrolet P30	Mini Bird was the first Blue Bird marketed with special-needs customers in mind.; Featured the same body width 96 inches (2.4 m) as full-size Blue Birds.
Conventional	c.1957–2004	Type C (conventional)	Chrysler Corporation: Dodge D-300 (to 1977); DaimlerChrysler Corporation: Freightliner FS-65 (1997–2002); Ford Motor Company: Ford B600/B700/B800/B8000 (to 1998); General Motors: Chevrolet/GMC B-Series (1966–1991); International Harvester; Navistar International: Loadstar 1703 (1962–1978); S-1700/S1800 (1979–1989); International 3800 (1989–2004)	The Conventional uses a cowled-chassis version of the body used by the All American (except for the D3 Series) and the TC/2000. Available on a wide variety of commercially produced chassis, discontinued with the end of International 3800 production in 2004.; Replaced by Blue Bird Vision.; In export markets, the Conventional was often produced using locally sourced chassis.
Chevrolet/GMC CV200	1992–2002	Type C (conventional)	General Motors: Chevrolet/GMC B7	Produced under a supply agreement between Blue Bird and General Motors; the Chevrolet/GMC chassis was used exclusively by the company. Ford, Freightliner, Navistar versions of the Conventionals were produced as options.; The 2003 CV200 was the last full-sized C school bus (prior to 2016) available with a gasoline engine.; CV200 was replaced by the Vision.
SBCV	2004–2007	Type C (conventional)	Navistar International: International 3300	The SBCV was the replacement for the Conventional based on the International 3800; Blue Bird is the only body manufacturer to use this chassis besides IC Bus.; Produced alongside Vision until its 2007 discontinuation.
TC/1000	1997–1999	Type D (transit-style): front engine	Blue Bird Corporation	Marketed primarily for special-needs customers; Front-engine version only; smaller than TC/2000; Flat-floor interior configuration; Had a similar roof style to the All American D3, looking more boxy than the standard rounded roof look of the AA series and the TC2000, though some may have a more standard roof depending on the year
TC/2000	1987–2003	Type D (transit-style): front engine; rear engine	Blue Bird Corporation	Lighter duty chassis than All American; Lower price meant to attract larger fleet buyers.

=== Other vehicles ===
Other product lines
Model	Production	Configuration	Type	Notes
City Bird	1976–1986	Rear engine High floor	Transit bus	Short-wheelbase adaptation of All American for the mass-transit market
CS-Series APC-Series	1990s-2002	Front-engine Rear-engine High floor	Commercial bus Transit bus Shuttle bus Specialty use || Various derivatives of the All American and TC/2000 product lines developed for commercial use. CS=Commercial Series APC=All Purpose Coach The CS-Series was marketed towards transit and shuttle use while the APC was marketed towards various commercial buyers. Both versions were sold as an incomplete vehicle (shell) for conversion to multiple types of specialty uses.	
Q-Bus	1992–2001	Rear engine High floor	Transit bus	Introduced in 1992 as the replacement for the City Bird. First Blue Bird transit bus not derived from the All American or TC/2000.
Xcel102	2002–2007	Rear engine High floor	Transit bus	Replacement for the Q-Bus product line, built with a 102-inch wide body
Blue Bird/NABI Ultra LF/Ultra LMB	2003–2010	Rear engine Low floor	Transit bus	Both buses developed by Blue Bird during its ownership by Henlys Ultra LF=low-floor Ultra LMB=low-mass bus Built by NABI in Anniston, Alabama, from 2007 to 2010.
LTC-40	1997–2003	Rear engine	Motorcoach	The LTC-40 was the first motorcoach designed by Blue Bird. LTC=Luxury Touring Coach From 1998 onwards, the LTC formed the basis for the Wanderlodge motorhome.
Wanderlodge	1963–2009	Front-engine Rear-engine	Luxury recreational vehicle	The Wanderlodge was product line of luxury recreational vehicles produced across three generations. Interiors were hand-assembled to buyer specification, with several interior configurations available. Derived from the All American school bus from 1963 to 1989; derived from LTC motorcoach from 1997 to 2009. Rights to Wanderlodge sold to Complete Coach Works in 2007; production ceased in 2009.
Blue Bird Sigma	2014–present	Front-engine Rear-engine High floor	Transit bus	The Sigma is a transit bus product line produced entirely for export markets. It is a high-floor bus derived from the T3FE/T3RE chassis.

==== Exports ====
Blue Bird have also built a number of buses for the United Kingdom market, with 62 Blue Bird buses being exported to the UK between 1992 and 2007. Most of the vehicles exported were right hand drive variants of the Blue Bird All American and the Blue Bird Q-Bus. Various local councils, such as Staffordshire County Council and West Sussex County Council, imported a large number of Blue Bird school buses for their own school routes; FirstGroup were the largest private customer in the United Kingdom, ordering eighteen All Americans in 2002.

In addition to school buses, a single low-floor city bus, known as the Blue Bird LFCC9, was built in late 2003. The 29-seater midibus, registered NK53TJV, received the then-popular Plaxton Pointer 2 bodywork and entered service with Arriva North East.

=== Prototypes ===
Model	Year	Chassis (configuration)	Notes
Envirobus 2000	1996	Blue Bird Q-Bus (rear-engine)	Loosely based on the Q-Bus, the Envirobus 2000 served as a testbed for the viability for compressed natural gas (CNG) in large-scale production for school buses. A number of advanced safety features were integrated as part of the design. The Envirobus was not intended for production in its prototype form.
Blue Bird/Ford Conventional	2002	Ford F-750 Super Duty (conventional, cowled chassis)	As Blue Bird sought to replace the General Motors-chassis CV200 after 2003, several Blue Bird Conventional bodies were fitted on F-750 Super Duty chassis as a potential replacement. As Ford never completed a supply agreement with Blue Bird, these would become the very last Ford-chassis school buses ever built. Several features of these prototypes were integrated into the Vision introduced in 2003.
EC-72	2006	Blue Bird Vision (conventional, cowled chassis)	Using the chassis of the Vision, the EC-72 was a limited-production series of conventional prototypes intended for testing new production designs; the EC-72 used the hood later seen on the 2008–2014 Vision along with a new roof and window design. Approximately 50 were produced in total.

=== Company timeline ===
Blue Bird Corporation timeline, 1970–present
1970s	1980s	1990s	2000s	2010s	2020s
'70	'71	'72	'73	'74	'75	'76	'77	'78	'79	'80	'81	'82	'83	'84	'85	'86	'87	'88	'89	'90	'91	'92	'93	'94	'95	'96	'97	'98	'99	'00	'01	'02	'03	'04	'05	'06	'07	'08	'09	'10	'11	'12	'13	'14	'15	'16	'17	'18	'19	'20	'21	'22	'23	'24	'25
Company ownership	A.L. Luce family	Merrill Lynch Capital	Henlys plc	Peach; County; Holdings	Cerberus Capital	Publicly traded _{(Cerberus Majority owner)}
Buses (by configuration)	Blue Bird school buses
Type A	Single rear-wheel	MB-II by Girardin	Micro Bird SRW	Micro Bird MB-II
Micro Bird T-Series
Dual rear-wheel	Micro Bird (DRW)	Micro Bird T-Series DRW
MB-IV by Girardin	Micro Bird G5
Type B	Mini Bird
Type C	Conventional (various chassis)	SBCV (Navistar 3300)
CV200 (GM B7)	Vision	Vision	Vision
Type D	All American series	All American Forward Engine (1957)	All American Forward Engine (1989)	All American (A3FE)	All American (T3FE/T3RE)
All American Rear Engine (various chassis)	AARE (Blue Bird)	All American Rear Engine (1989)	All American (A3RE)	All American (D3RE/D3FE)
Transit Coach series: TC/2000; TC/1000	TC/2000 _{Forward Engine}	TC/2000 _{Forward Engine}	TC/2000; Forward Engine
TC/2000 _{Rear Engine}	TC/2000 _{Rear Engine}
TC/1000
Buses (by type)	Blue Bird non-school buses
Transit Buses	City Bird	Q-Bus	Xcel102
CS-Series	Sigma (export only)
Ultra LF/Ultra LMB
Coaches/recreational vehicles	LTC-40
Wanderlodge (96" body)	Wanderlodge (102" body)	Wanderlodge LX/LXi/M380

== Manufacturing and assembly ==
Traditionally, school buses such as those produced by Blue Bird consist of components purchased from various outside suppliers and parts which are manufactured in-house to the company's specifications. These two categories of parts are then typically assembled into bodies which can be mounted onto chassis which have often been variations of those used in a myriad of truck applications. Alongside its role of vehicle assembly, the Blue Bird facility in Fort Valley, Georgia, also manufactured parts used for all company facilities to produce vehicles. Blue Bird Wanderlodges were manufactured in an adjacent facility in Fort Valley, including Wanderlodge Wayside Park, a tree-shaded motor home park to accommodate Wanderlodges visiting for service.

Blue Bird currently operates its Fort Valley manufacturing facility as its sole point of assembly; Micro Birds are assembled in the Girardin factory in Drummondville, Quebec, Canada. In the past, the company held four factories (and the Wanderlodge factory) in the United States, two facilities in Canada (separate from Girardin), one in Mexico, and one in Guatemala. In the 1980s, Blue Bird exited production in Central America; during the 2000s, the company gradually wound down its number of factories as the company centralized production and consolidated its model lines to school buses and their derivatives. In 2010, Blue Bird North Georgia (LaFayette, Georgia) was closed.

Blue Bird Corporation manufacturing facilities
Name	Location	Product lines	Year opened	Year closed	Notes
United States
Blue Bird Body Company	Fort Valley, Georgia	All American; TC/2000; Vision; Q-Bus; CS; parts	See Notes		The first Fort Valley facility was opened in 1935; It was destroyed by fire in 1945.; The present-day Fort Valley facility was opened in 1946.
Micro Bird USA	Plattsburgh, New York	Micro Bird (commercial)	2025		Opened in 2008 as United States production facility for Nova Bus, purchased by Blue Bird at the end of 2024. Specializes in commercial bus production and improving the BAA compliance of its product line.
Blue Bird North Georgia	LaFayette, Georgia	Vision; Conventional; TC/2000	1988	2010	Closed August 30, 2010.
Blue Bird Midwest	Mount Pleasant, Iowa	TC/2000; Conventional; Mini Bird; Micro Bird	1962	2002	In August 2002, Blue Bird announced that it will shut down the Blue Bird Midwest manufacturing plant. Approximately 350 employees were laid off, along with 70 job losses at Celestica in the same month, resulted in the loss of about 10% of the town's jobs.
Blue Bird East	Buena Vista, Virginia	Conventional; Mini Bird; TC/2000	1972	1992	
Blue Bird Wanderlodge	Fort Valley, Georgia	Wanderlodge; parts	1963	2007	Originally opened as Cardinal Manufacturing
Canada
Canadian Blue Bird	Brantford, Ontario	TC/2000; Conventional; Micro Bird; parts	1958	2007	
Blue Bird Québec	Saint-Lin-Laurentides, Quebec (Note: Manufacturer plates listed the town as "Ville des Laurentides, Québec".)	Conventional	1975	1982	Acquired J.H. Corbeil assets, and converted the assembly line for its products. Factory bought back by the Corbeil family and local businessmen in 1985, becoming Les Enterprises Michel Corbeil, until its acquisition by Collins Bus Corporation in 2007, shutting down manufacturing for good.
Micro Bird, Inc.	Drummondville, Quebec	Micro Bird (MB-II, G5)	1981		Girardin Minibus production facility
Worldwide facilities
Blue Bird de Mexico	Monterrey, Nuevo León	Conventional	1995	2001	
Blue Bird Central America	Guatemala City, Guatemala	See Notes	1965	1980s	Produced All American and Conventional bodies on locally available chassis.

== Branding ==
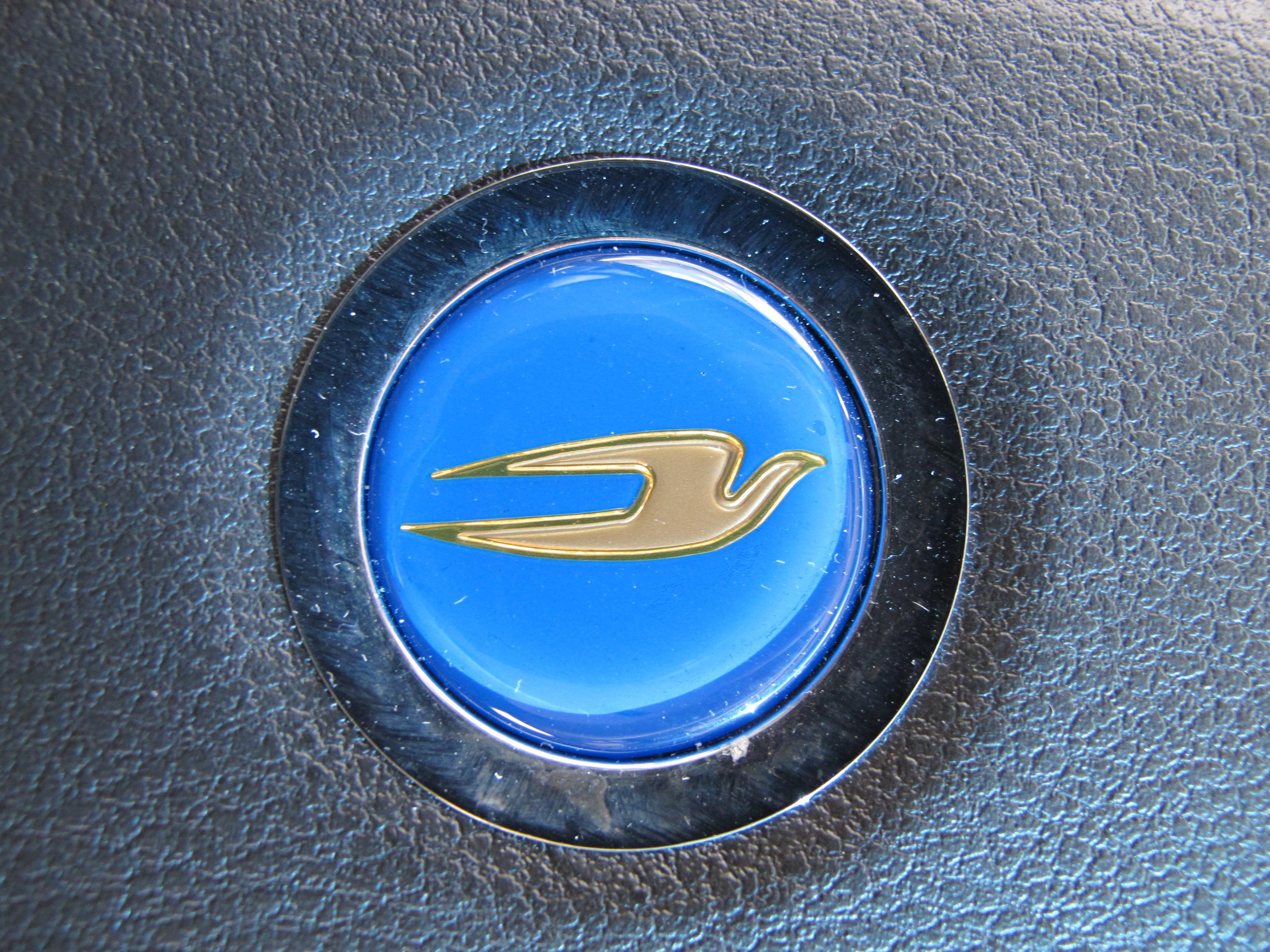
Blue Bird company logo in steering wheel

=== Company name ===
The exact origin of the Blue Bird company name is unknown; several theories are known to exist. Most commonly, A.L. Luce was perceived to have been hesitant about using the family surname for the company out of fears of mispronunciation (i.e., a Luce bus = "loose bus").

In another version, when showing a blue and yellow demonstrator unit to school officials, Luce overheard the positive reception of school children who had seen the bus, who nicknamed it "a pretty blue bird", and the name was chosen for the company. Conversely, since the end of the 1930s, yellow would become the exterior color associated with American-manufactured school buses.

=== Roof emblem ===
The Blue Bird company emblem is a silhouette profile of the company namesake bluebird; the design has been painted on the roof on many of its buses since the beginning of the 1960s. Later in the decade, the company began to combine the emblem with a stripe painted on the roof of the bus, known as a "streamer". On school buses, the emblem and streamers are black (if specifications allow for their use); the streamer is also offered as an option. On non-school buses, the emblem and streamer are also offered in various colors, coordinated to the design of the bus.

The combination of roof emblems and streamers would come into use by other school manufacturers as a design feature; the latter would become most closely associated with Blue Bird and its roof emblem.

In 2013, the roof streamer was redesigned for the first time. To simplify manufacturing, the roof-length streamer was replaced by a single design shared across Blue Bird and Micro Bird buses (introduced for 2014 production), with three versions, distinguished by fuel type. Diesel-fuel buses retained the previous black design, with propane-fuel vehicles receiving a green emblem and streamer; the gasoline-fuel Vision received a blue-colored design.

For 2019 production, Blue Bird retired the roof streamer design. As the company introduced electric-powered buses for 2020, an electric cord-style streamer was introduced with a green Blue Bird emblem (distinguishing it from propane-fuel buses).

== See also ==
- School bus
- North American Bus Industries
- List of school bus manufacturers
