= Albert Luce =

Albert Laurence Luce
- Born: June 26, 1888; La Grange, Illinois, US
- Died: October 16, 1962 (aged 74); San Francisco, California, US
- Education: Northwestern University
- Occupations: industrialist, entrepreneur, bus designer
- Years active: 1915–1950
- Known for: Founder of Blue Bird

Albert Laurence Luce (June 26, 1888 – October 16, 1962) was an American industrialist, entrepreneur, bus designer, and business owner. He is best known for founding the Blue Bird Body Company, a bus and recreational vehicle manufacturer now known as Blue Bird Corporation.

== Biography ==
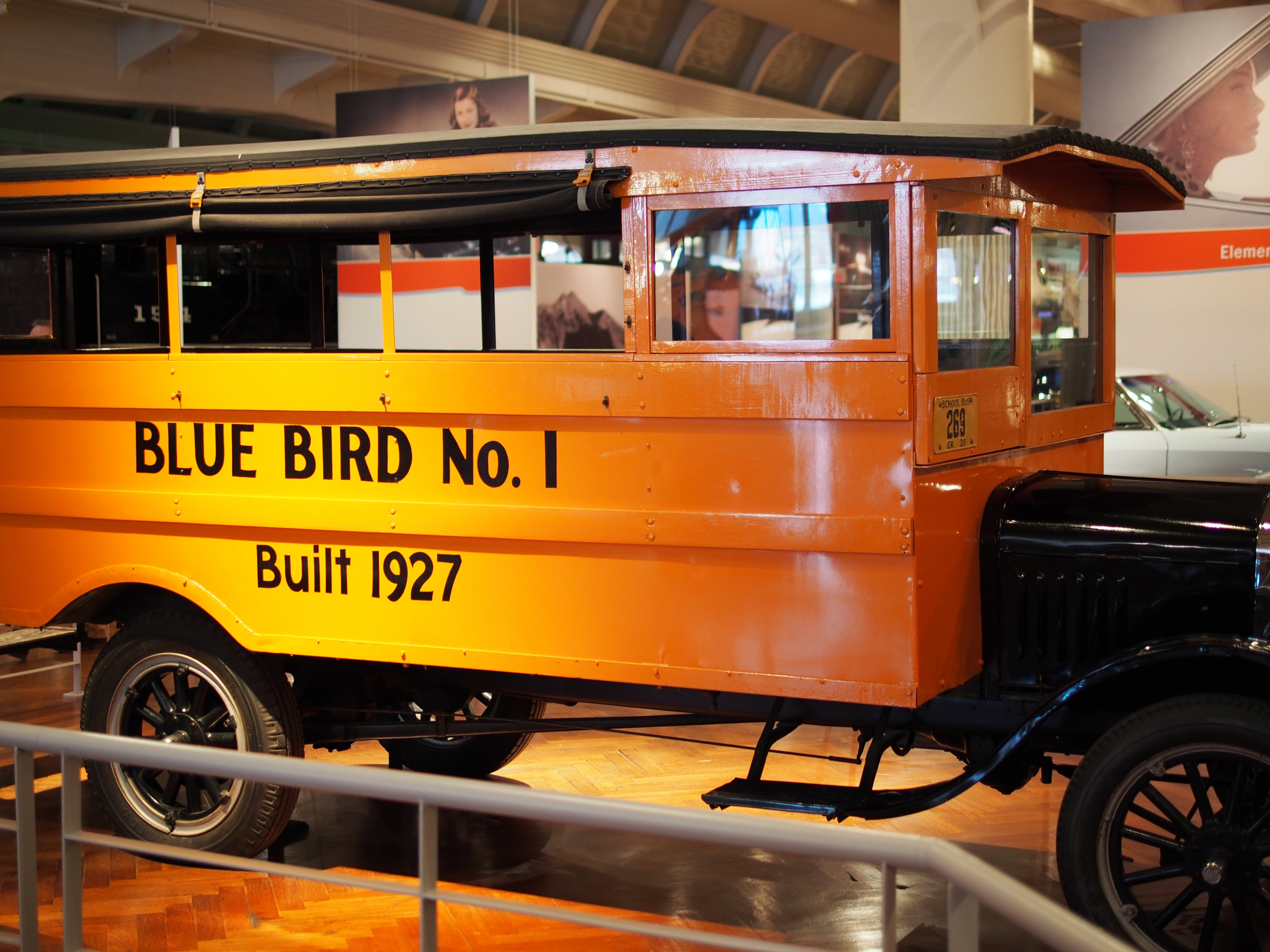
"Blue Bird Number 1", the first bus constructed by A.L. Luce in 1927. It was donated to The Henry Ford Museum in 2008.

=== Early life ===
Albert Laurence Luce was born on June 26, 1888, in La Grange, Illinois, a village in Cook County, Illinois. His parents were George P. Luce and Jennie Squire Luce. His father managed a lumber yard in La Grange. After completing high school in La Grange, Luce attended Northwestern University, studying science.

Luce moved to El Centro, California in 1913 to become a distributor for Maxwell automobiles (a forerunner of Chrysler). Luce enlisted in the U.S. Army in 1917. He fought in France in 1918, and was returned to the U.S. in 1919. He purchased a Ford franchise in Fort Valley, Georgia; which would become his home for the rest of his life. In 1920, he married Helen Mathews (April 10, 1890 – July 2, 1976), a daughter of a local minister.

=== 1920s: First bus designs ===
As his business grew, Luce purchased a second Ford franchise in Perry, Georgia, which he named Houston County Motor Company. In 1925, the dealership received an order from a local cement company manufacturer for a Model TT fitted with a bus body to transport company workers. The wooden bus body, supplied from a North Carolina millyard, seemed to Luce not sufficiently durable for the rough Georgia roads; he was concerned the bus would have to be replaced before the owner finished paying for it. To develop a stronger body, he and a blacksmith in his Perry dealership fabricated a steel body.

=== 1930s: Founding of Blue Bird ===
The Great Depression nearly halted car sales at Luce's outlets. In 1930–1931, sales fell over 95%; while only 7 buses were sold, they constituted the majority of sales for his operations. Luce closed the Fort Valley dealership in late 1931 and sold the Houston County Motor Company in 1932, then started a company specializing in school bus bodies. First using rented facilities, in 1935 he built a 27,000 ft² factory in Fort Valley.

=== 1940s ===
During World War II, Blue Bird existed as a military supplier, building bus and ambulance bodies for the armed forces.

In 1945, a fire that burned down the Blue Bird factory in Fort Valley nearly killed Luce, as he had become trapped trying to fight the fire with a fire extinguisher, but was rescued by a factory worker shortly before the factory exploded. By mid-1946, a new, larger factory was built in Fort Valley, however, Luce nearly died from a heart attack at the factory shortly after its opening.

Luce and his son George traveled to Europe in 1948. At the 1948 Paris Auto Salon they saw an all-new forward-control bus. Highly interested in its General Motors/Opel chassis, Luce unsuccessfully tried to secure a supply arrangement with GM. After buying the bus outright and importing it into the United States, the chassis was modified and developed for use with a school bus body, becoming the first Blue Bird All American. In production since 1949, the All American is the longest-produced model of school bus in North America.

=== Later life ===
Luce retired from Blue Bird in 1950. During a trip to California in October 1962, Luce had a second heart attack, and he died from pneumonia in San Francisco. He was buried in Oaklawn Cemetery, Fort Valley, Georgia.

== Pioneers of the yellow school bus industry ==
Luce is among the early school bus industry pioneers including Perley A. Thomas, who founded Thomas Built Buses, D.H. "Dave" Ward, founder of Ward Body Works (now IC Bus), and the educator Dr. Frank W. Cyr, who, for his persistent work since 1939 to develop school bus safety standards across the country, is widely considered the father of the yellow school bus.
