= The Rightly So =

Americana duo

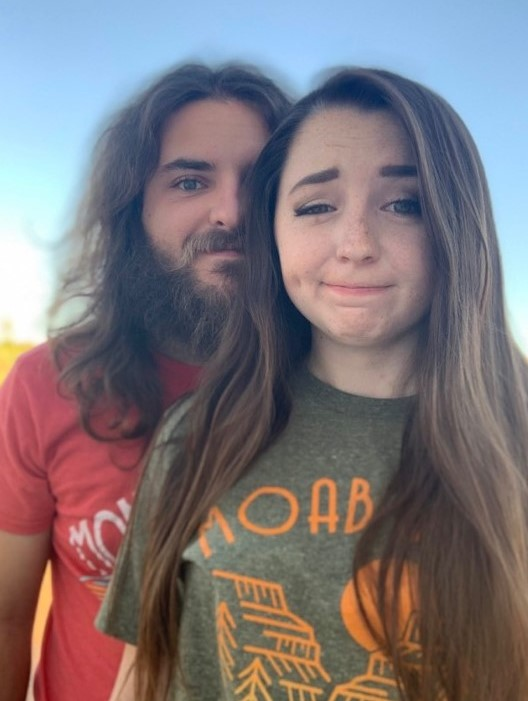
- Jess Chizuk and Greg Zeis - The Rightly So

Background information
- Born: Rochester, NY Buffalo, NY United States
- Origin: Buffalo, NY
- Genres: Folk, Americana, rock
- Occupations: Musicians, singers, songwriters
- Instruments: Vocals, acoustic guitar, electric guitar
- Years active: 2013–present
- Website: www.therightlyso.com

The Rightly So, from Buffalo, NY, is an Americana duo composed of Jess Chizuk and Greg Zeis. Chizuk and Zeis began playing together in 2013. They have released two albums: The Rightly So in 2017 and Vandura in 2019.

== Early history ==
With success at an early age, Chizuk received multiple songwriting and singing accolades before joining the duo, including first place in the Folk category at the 2015 Smoky Mountain Songwriter's Festival. She was selected as a finalist in the 2015 Songwriter Serenade competition and was awarded the 2014 Lucille & Jack Yellen Songwriter's Scholarship.

Before his collaboration with Chizuk, Zeis headed up the band Zeis and the Muckrakers who won the 2014 Best New Band from the All WNY Music Awards.

== Touring ==
The Rightly So began touring nationally in early 2018, and has performed upwards of one hundred shows a year since 2014. The duo has toured in 20 different states including Texas, California, New Mexico, Louisiana, and New York. The Rightly So has also performed with Corey Brannan and the Vandoliers while on tour in Oregon.

== Discography ==
The Rightly So (2017)

Their first album, The Rightly So, was mainly an acoustic effort with 8 songs. Seven of the eight tracks were co-written by Chizuk and Zeis with the 8th, "Wine and Shine", was written by Josh Geercken.

Vandura (2019)

The latest album Vandura, with 11 tracks, has been described as a more folk and country album, but some commentators have noted the harder-edged vocals, a strong electric presence, and a Hammond organ. The duo has spent the last 2 year on the road, playing venues across the country in over 20 states in their homemade RV. This album is a reflection of time spent on the road.

== Van life ==
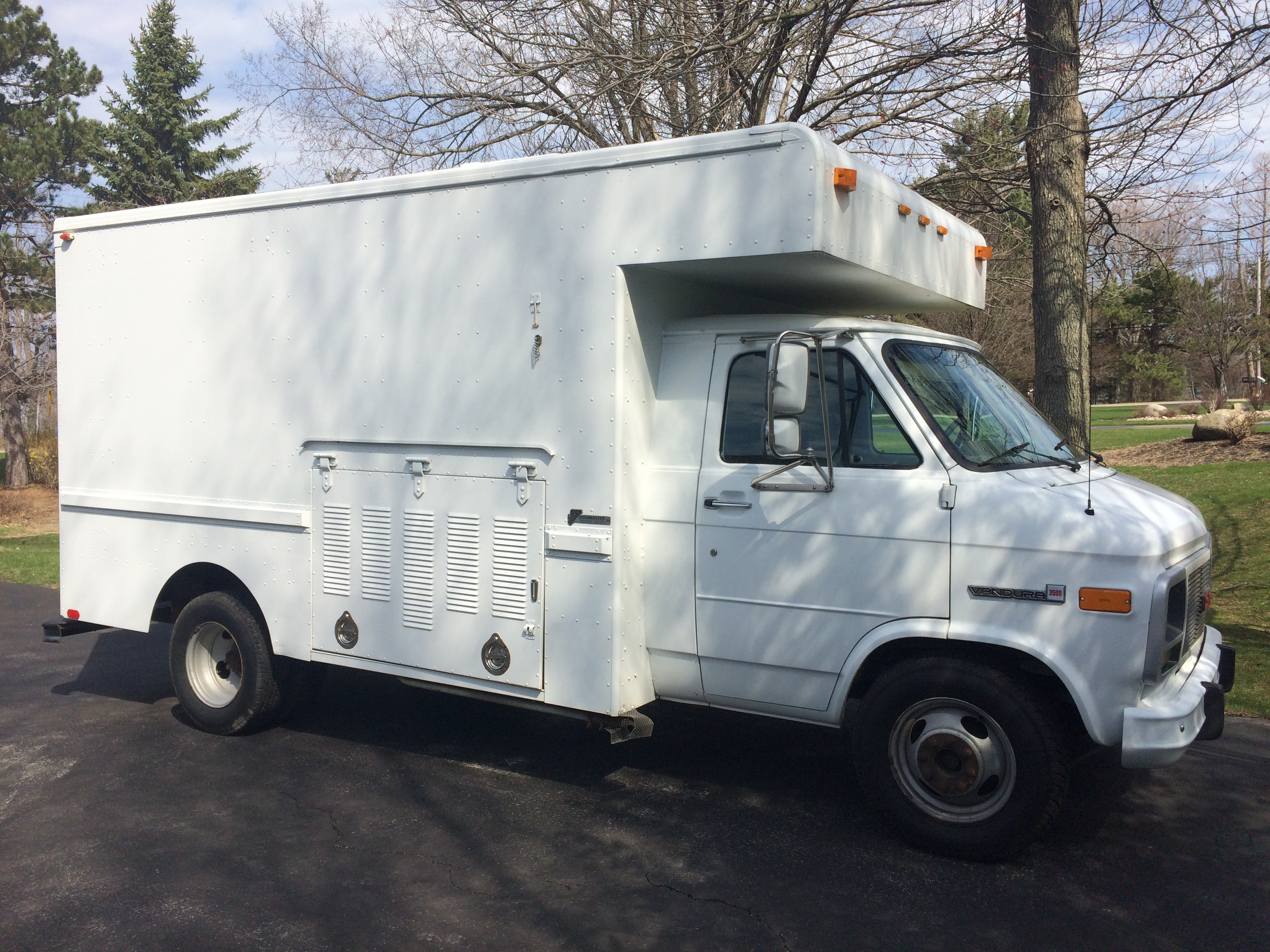
Homemade RV of The Rightly So

The Rightly So has been touring the country since early 2018 in a 1995 GMC Vandura box truck converted to an RV. Jess Chizuk maintains a blog on her personal web page chronicling the duos trials and tribulations while living in the tiny space.
