= Conversion van =

Vehicle for road trips and camping

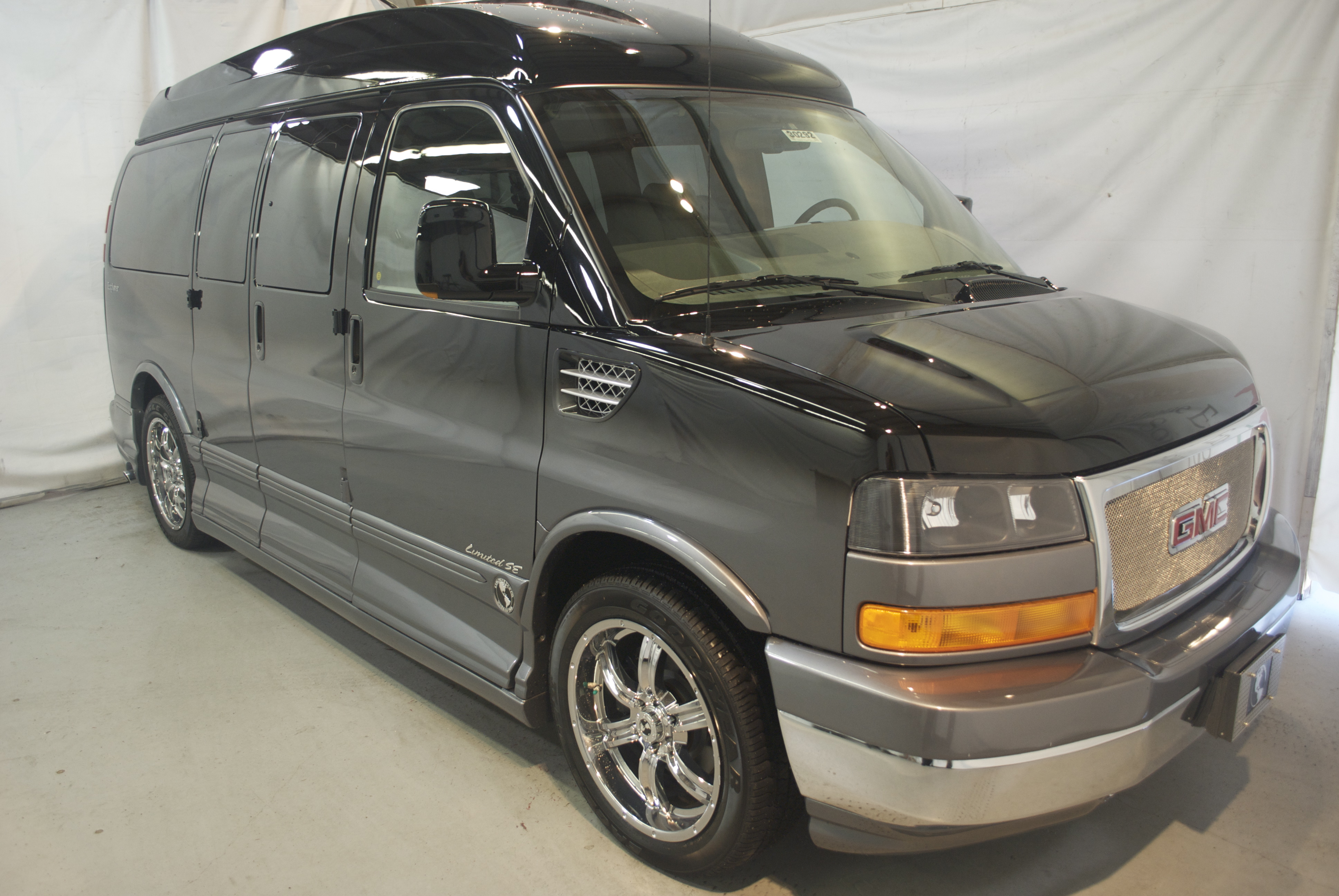
Converted 2009 GMC Savana

A conversion van is a full-sized cargo panel van that is sent to third-party companies to be outfitted with various luxuries for road trips and camping. It can also mean a full-size passenger van in which the rear seating have been rearranged for taxis, school buses, shuttle buses, and limo purposes in place of a family van. Other conversions include bespoke fitting services to be undertaken to make the load area of light commercial vehicles suitable for industrial work. This includes various things such as racking systems for the storage of tools and goods so they can be kept safe and utilise the full storage capability of the vehicle.

== History ==
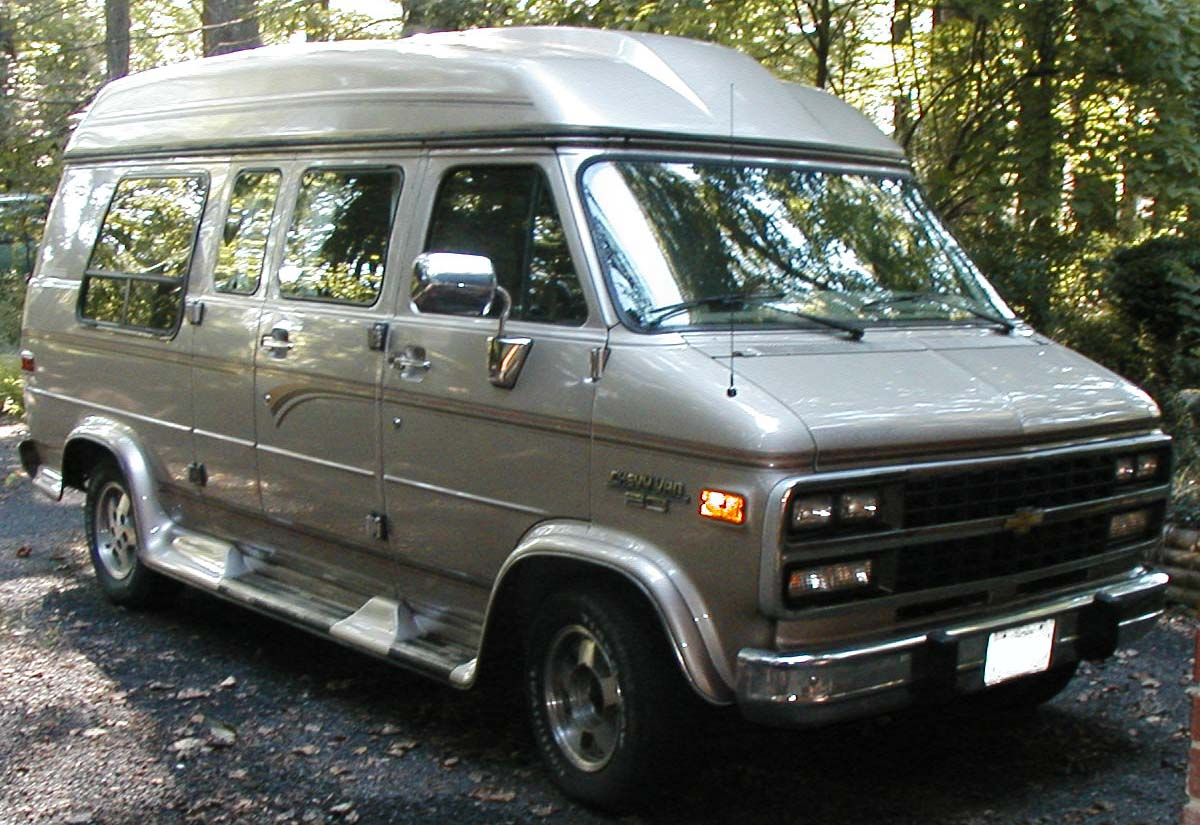
Converted 1992–1996 Chevrolet G20 Van

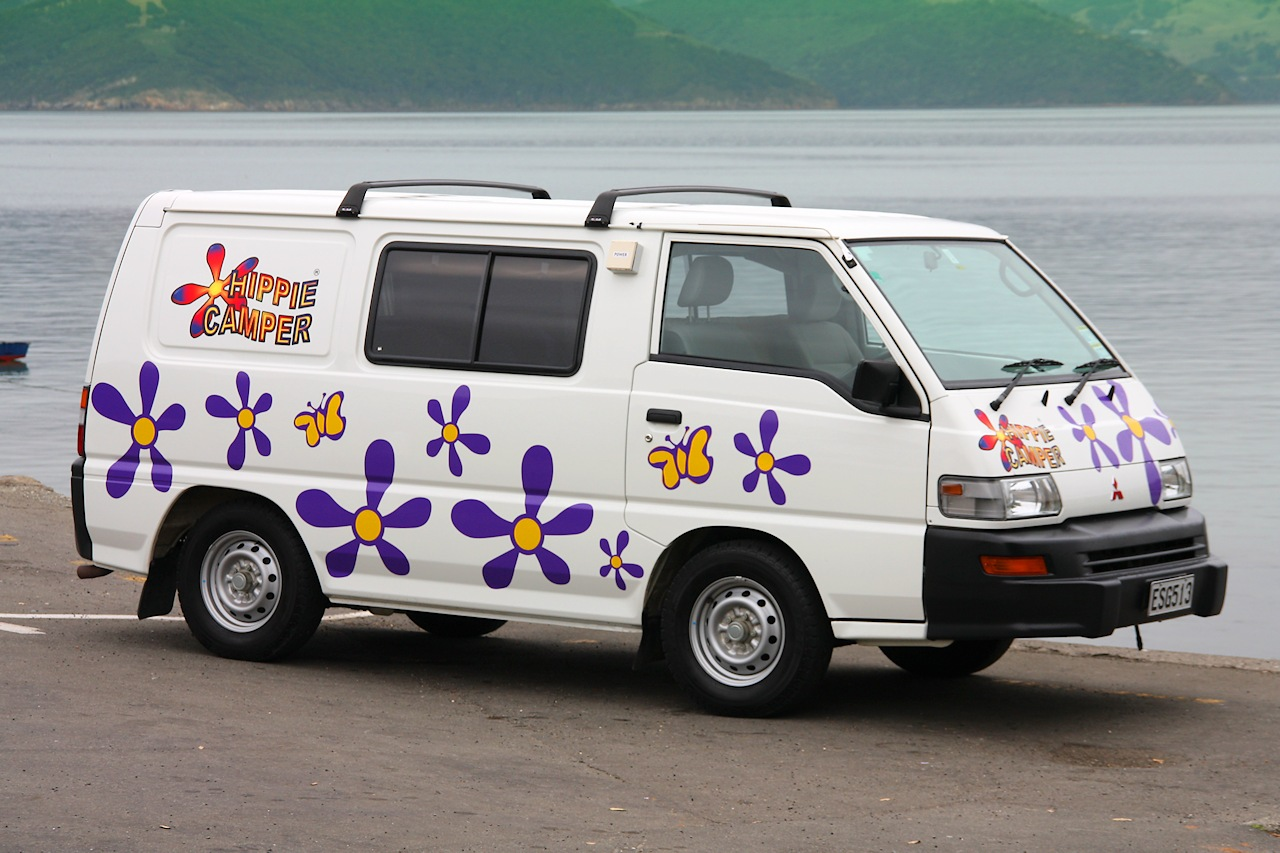
Converted Mitsubishi L300 in New Zealand

Conversion vans came into style during the 1960s. Early conversions were considered camping vans, some having pop tops or fixed fiberglass bubble tops. They sported gas stoves, places to sleep, tables, carpet, lights etc. Later in the 70's often with murals painted along the sides, portal and other shaped windows.

After the mid 80s, luxurious interiors featuring thickly padded seats, wood trim and luxury lighting began to appear. At the same time, both the U.S. federal government and vehicle manufacturers began efforts to exert some degree of control on the van conversion industry, demanding that certain safety guidelines be adhered to. The price of conversion vans also started to increase as things such as sleeping accommodations, cooking utilities, televisions and other items were added to the conversion vans. The higher pricing and smaller market segment meant a resulting decrease in sales. Also, DVD and flat screen technology meant that many automobiles now have features once exclusive to conversion vans. At the same time, the price of gas was also increasing, leading still more people away from these large cargo vans, whose V-8 engines and poor aerodynamics resulted in poor gas mileage. Finally, the growing demand for minivans and SUVs siphoned off even more potential customers. Despite these setbacks though, as the economy boomed in the 1990s, conversion vans sales began to improve, with almost 200,000 units sold in 1994 alone. As of 2007, about 20,000 conversion vans are being sold each year, with most being sold for family transport.

== Top types ==
The most basic difference in conversion vans is the type of "top".

Low Tops- Low top vans retain the factory roof on the van. These vans are more aerodynamic, but have less interior space. During the '80s, these vans became less common because TVs, VCRs, and video games that became very popular were also very bulky. With the development of integrated DVDs and flat screen monitors, these vans have recovered somewhat, but they continue to run a distant second to high-topped vans.

High Tops- These vans have a portion of the original factory roof cut away and a fiberglass "high top", "elk roof" or "high-raised roof" added. This has become the signature feature of a conversion van. A high top allows occupants to stand in the van without bending over. For structural purposes, a section of the roof is often left at the front and back of the van. Modern vans, which have heavier frames, use less roof section than older vans. These fore and aft sections often have lights, storage shelves, stereo components, and, on older models, TVs and VCRs, much of which sits on the original roof section. The high top is a signature inclusion on disability vans because a wheelchair occupant can be lifted into the van without ducking. It has also become a requirement on campervans. The high top also allows for vastly more storage. Also, the early TVs and VCRs could be mounted in the ceiling, so they did not inhibit movement and leg room in the van. The first high tops started not much higher than the factory roof, then raised aft of the driver's seat with two skylights mounted in this section, typically flanking a TV antenna. This soon fell out of favor due to leaking and light hitting the occupants. High tops began to rise at a gentle angle with a steeply raked center spine section. The center section housed an internally mounted antenna and allowed for larger 13" TVs. With the advent of flat panel TVs and small DVD players replacing VCRs, the need for high tops has been reduced. However, the increased space is highly desired by customers, especially since conversion vans have moved toward the luxury end of the automotive spectrum, and the majority of conversion vans are still produced with a high top.

== Conversion types ==
There are several different types of conversions aside of the usual passenger-van-like conversion:

1. Travel van/family van- These are the standard conversion vans and the only ones offered with low tops as well as high tops. A typical travel van will accommodate seven passengers on one rear bench and four captain's chairs. Often, the rear bench electrically folds flat into a bed. These vans normally have large windows with shades, storage cabinets, and a TV. Originally, TVs were small DC conversion models with antennas. These TVs were bulky (especially in low tops where they had to be mounted on the floor) and not very useful due to poor signal. In the '80s, VCRs and later DVD players were added greatly improving the usefulness of the TV. Finally, flat screen monitors have eliminated the need for special cabinetry to hold the TV. High-end stereo systems and other electronics have become typical. Most accommodate multiple game systems.

2. Disability vans/wheelchair bus - The van has any or all of the following structural modifications that enable a person in a wheelchair to use the van: raised roof to allow proper clearance through the door, raised roof to allow adequate head clearance, lowered or dropped floor to allow adequate head clearance. These changes are made necessary because a person sitting in a wheelchair will almost always sit higher than a person sitting in the van's OEM seats. In all cases a platform lift is added to either the rear doors or passenger side doors to enable the person in a wheelchair to enter/exit the van. A lowered floor modification can be done just in the cargo area to save money whereas a full lowered floor is one in which both the cargo area and driver/passenger area are lowered. Standard lowered floor conversions are 150 mm and 230 mm (6" and 9").

3. Office vans - These vans are built like a small office in the back, with a desk and chair bolted to the floor, an electrical outlet in the office area (for computer, etc.), and usually one or two seats in the back for passengers. These are most popular for traveling salesmen and TV camera crews.

4. Motorhomes "Class B" campervan are built on a full size cargo van and are sometimes lengthened a couple of feet (0.5–1 m). Lengths range from 17–20 ft (5–6 m). "Class C" mini motorhomes have the back completely taken out of the van (known as a cutaway), and have it replaced with a larger back that offers more space than Class Bs. Lengths range from 18–30 ft (5–9 m). These vans have more features that enable camping, such as a toilet, fridge, portable microwave, sink, side sofa, popup canvas top that allows standing up, and sometimes a stove.

5. Shuttle vans - Shuttle vans are very similar to traveling vans, but with a different purpose and with a different seat configuration. While traveling vans are used by families, shuttle vans are usually used by businesses. These vans are traditionally used for taxis, school buses, limousines, airport buses, and for law enforcement.

6. Commercial vans - Commercial Vans have custom built interiors fitted with racking to meet the customers storage needs to improve efficiency and utilise dead space. Other work is also taken out on the vehicle to make it as user friendly as possible this includes lighting, onboard power systems, ventilation, heaters and corporate liveries.

7. Adventure vans - These are often custom made by small van conversion outfitters. They share a common theme in that they help people get off the beaten track for camping and exploring. Some of these converted vans have four-wheel drive drivetrains, suspension lifts and roof racks for carrying additional gear. Adventure vans typically include seating and sleeping arrangements for two to five people. Other amenities vary greatly; some adventure vans might have small kitchens and even indoor showers, where others may only have sleeping areas and perhaps a cooler or refrigerator.

== Vans used in conversions ==
=== Current ===
Conversion vans are originally bare, windowless full-size 1/2 tonne or 3/4 tonne payload cargo vans such as the Chevrolet Express/GMC Savana, the Mercedes-Benz Sprinter, Ram ProMaster Van, and the full-size Ford Transit. Recently, the Ford Transit Connect has been the subject of conversions. The microvan offers a vehicle with improved gas mileage and marks the first time since companies ceased conversions of Chrysler minivans that a car-based van has been used in conversions. The Conversion Van Marketing Association (CVMA) was a partnership between General Motors and seven conversion van manufacturers. Exclusive partnership meant members of the CVMA were the only manufacturers authorized by GM to build Chevrolet or GMC conversion vans, but this group dissolved at the end of 2016. The market for conversion products continues to experience consolidation.

=== Former ===
Vans used for conversions in the past that are no longer in production are the Chevrolet Van/GMC Vandura (1970–1996), the Chevrolet Astro/GMC Safari (1985–2005), the Dodge Ram Van (1981–2003), Chrysler minivans, Ford E-Series (1961–2014 in North America), the Volkswagen Bus and the Volkswagen Eurovan (1992–2003).

== Conversion minivans ==
- Chevrolet Astro (Discontinued after model year 2005)
- Chrysler Town & Country (discontinued)
- Chrysler Voyager
- Dodge Caravan (Discontinued)
- Ford Aerostar (Discontinued)
- Ford Transit Connect (Discontinued in the US after model year 2023)
- Ford Windstar (Discontinued)
- GMC Safari (Discontinued)
- Plymouth Voyager (Discontinued)
- Volkswagen Eurovan (Not imported to the US after model year 2003)

== Conversion full-size vans ==
- Chevrolet Express
- Chevrolet Van (Discontinued)
- Dodge Ram Van (Discontinued)
- Ford E-Series (Discontinued except for cutaway version)
- Ford Transit
- GMC Savana
- GMC Vandura (Discontinued)
- Mercedes-Benz Sprinter
- Nissan NV
- Ram ProMaster

== See also ==
- Campervan
- Cutaway van chassis
- Delivery (commerce)
- Free Wheelin' (1976)
