= Scarborough Van Assembly =

- Built: 1952
- Operated: 1974 - 1993
- Location: Scarborough, Ontario, Canada
- Coordinates: 43.7267°N 79.2919°W
- Industry: Automotive
- Products: Vans
- Owner: General Motors Canada
- Defunct: 1993

Scarborough Van Assembly was a vehicle manufacturing plant owned by General Motors Canada in Scarborough, Ontario, Canada, which opened in 1952 to build Frigidaire refrigerators. Vehicle production began in 1974. It was located in Golden Mile, between Victoria Park Avenue and Warden Avenue. The plant employed 2,800 workers before closing in 1993. The site is now a retail shopping mall, known as Eglinton Town Centre.

== History ==
The plant began building Frigidaire refrigerators in 1952 then started as an automotive components manufacturing plant in 1963 before being converted into a van assembly plant in 1974. The plant produced GM vans as well as GM and Chevrolet cube van cabs and chassis. In 1986, the one-millionth van was produced at the Scarborough van plant.

Around Thanksgiving of 1989, General Motors announced that they would be closing the van plant in Scarborough, and awarding the van contract to Flint Truck Assembly. The last van rolled off the Scarborough line on May 6, 1993. Production was then transferred to Flint Truck Assembly and the process of dismantling the plant began. After three years at Flint, the van division moved to Wentzville Assembly in Missouri, in July 1996.

After closure, most of the site became Eglinton Town Centre retail space and a Cineplex Odeon theatre was built and opened in 2000. The southern end of the property was purchased by the Toronto Transit Commission in the mid-1990s for the construction of the Comstock Bus Garage that opened in 2002 replacing two older garages.

== Employee Re-deployment and fate ==
The Scarborough plant employed 2,800 people. Most of the employees were transferred to Oshawa Truck Assembly or Oshawa Car Assembly shortly after its closure. The former workforce were laid off again in 2009 and the latter was closed on December 18, 2019, but was restarted November 10, 2021.

=== Models produced ===
- Chevrolet Van (1974–1993)
- Chevrolet Beauville (1974–1993)
- Chevrolet Sportvan (1974–1993)
- GMC Rally Van (1974–1993)
- GMC Vandura (1974–1993)
- GMC Vandura HD (1985–1993)
