= Chevrolet van =

Chevrolet/GMC van
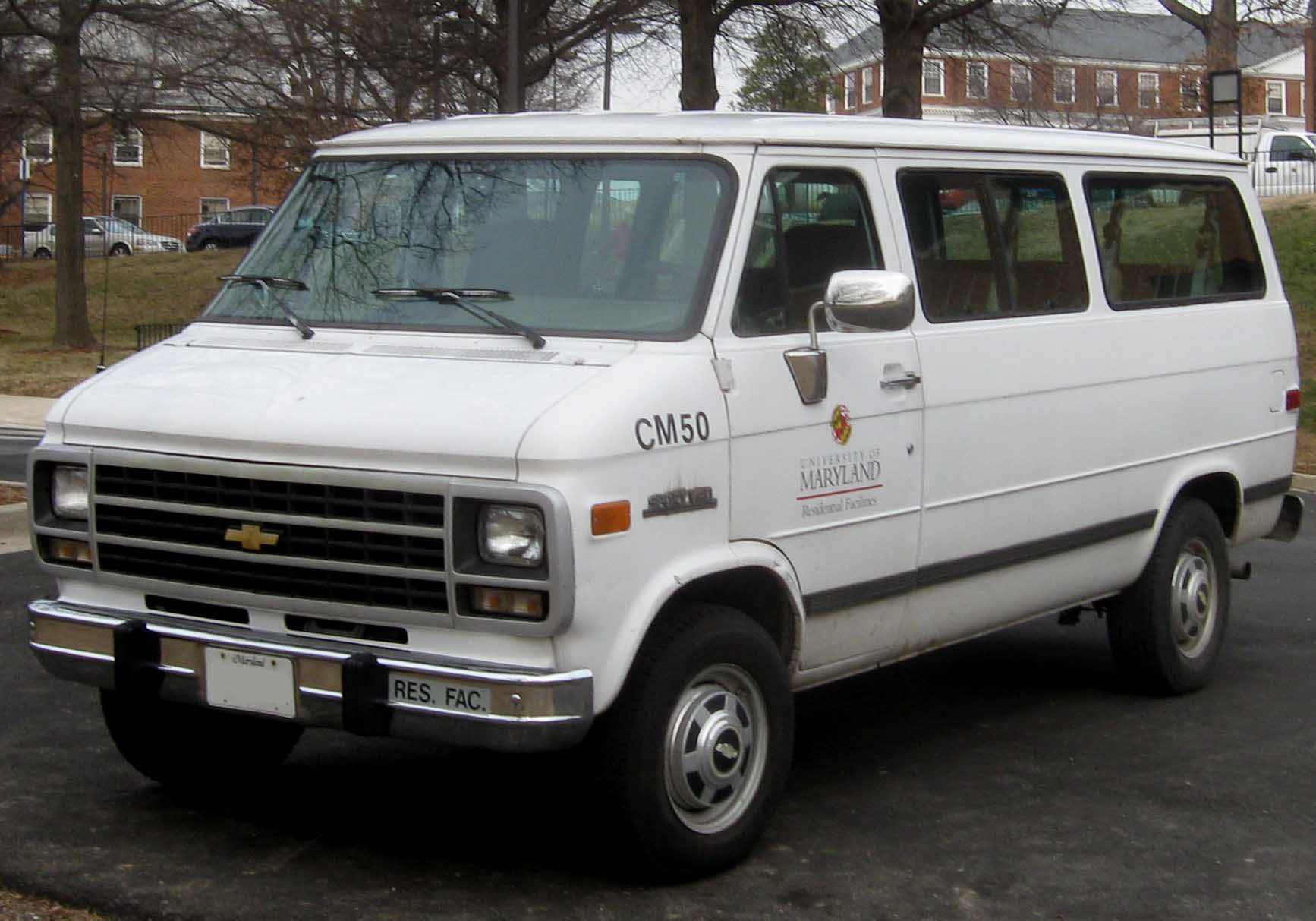
- 1992–1996 Chevrolet Sportvan

Overview
- Manufacturer: Chevrolet/GMC (General Motors)
- Production: 1964–present

Body and chassis
- Body style: Full-size van
- Layout: Front mid-engine, rear-wheel drive (1964–1970); Front engine, rear-wheel drive (1971–present)
- Platform: General Motors G-series truck

Chronology
- Predecessor: Chevrolet Corvan/Greenbrier; Chevrolet Suburban panel van

The Chevrolet van is a range of vans manufactured by General Motors since the 1964 model year. Introduced as the successor for the rear-engine Corvair Corvan/Greenbrier, the design not only shifted from to a forward-mounted engine, but adopted mechanical commonality with the Chevrolet C/K light truck line. Alongside a passenger van, the model line has been sold as a cargo van (replacing the Chevrolet Suburban panel truck) and as a cutaway van chassis (serving as the basis for a variety of custom applications).

Designated as the G-series, the Chevrolet van has also been sold by GMC since 1964. The Chevrolet Van name applies to the cargo variant, with both Chevrolet and GMC using multiple other names for passenger versions. Four generations of the model line have been produced: the first two generations (1964–1966, 1967–1970) used a front mid-engine layout (placing the engine between the front seats). Since 1971, the model line has placed the engine above the front axle, forward of the front seats.

Currently in its fourth generation, the Chevrolet Express and GMC Savana became the first version of the model line to use a single nameplate for each brand.

== Background ==
1964 Chevrolet Corvair 95 Greenbrier van, rear-engine predecessor of the GM G-series van.

In 1950, Volkswagen introduced the Volkswagen Transporter as a forward-control variant of the Beetle. In North America, the Microbus was marketed as a station wagon (a precursor to the minivan) and as a panel van/sedan delivery alternative, making it a precursor to the modern full-size van. As with the Beetle, the Microbus was a rear-engine vehicle with an air-cooled flat-four engine.

In response to the VW Microbus, both Ford and GM introduced their first van designs for the 1961 model year. Ford introduced its Econoline and Falcon Club Wagon, using a Ford Falcon chassis (placing the engine between the front seats); this style would be used by the Dodge A100 in 1964. Chevrolet launched the rear-engine Chevrolet Corvair 95 model line, which included the Corvair 95 panel van and pickup truck and the Corvair Greenbrier passenger van (marketed as a wagon).

Though the Corvair 95 shared a nearly identical wheelbase with the VW Microbus and also used air-cooled engines, it was fitted with the powertrain of the Corvair car line, which was fitted with a flat-six engine, offering substantially more power than the Microbus (along with an optional automatic transmission - a feature not seen in the Volkswagen until 1973).

Following the introduction of the G-series van, Chevrolet ended production of the Corvair 95/Greenbrier during the 1965 model year; the Corvair pickup truck was largely replaced by the return of the Chevrolet El Camino.

== First generation (1964–1966) ==
First generation
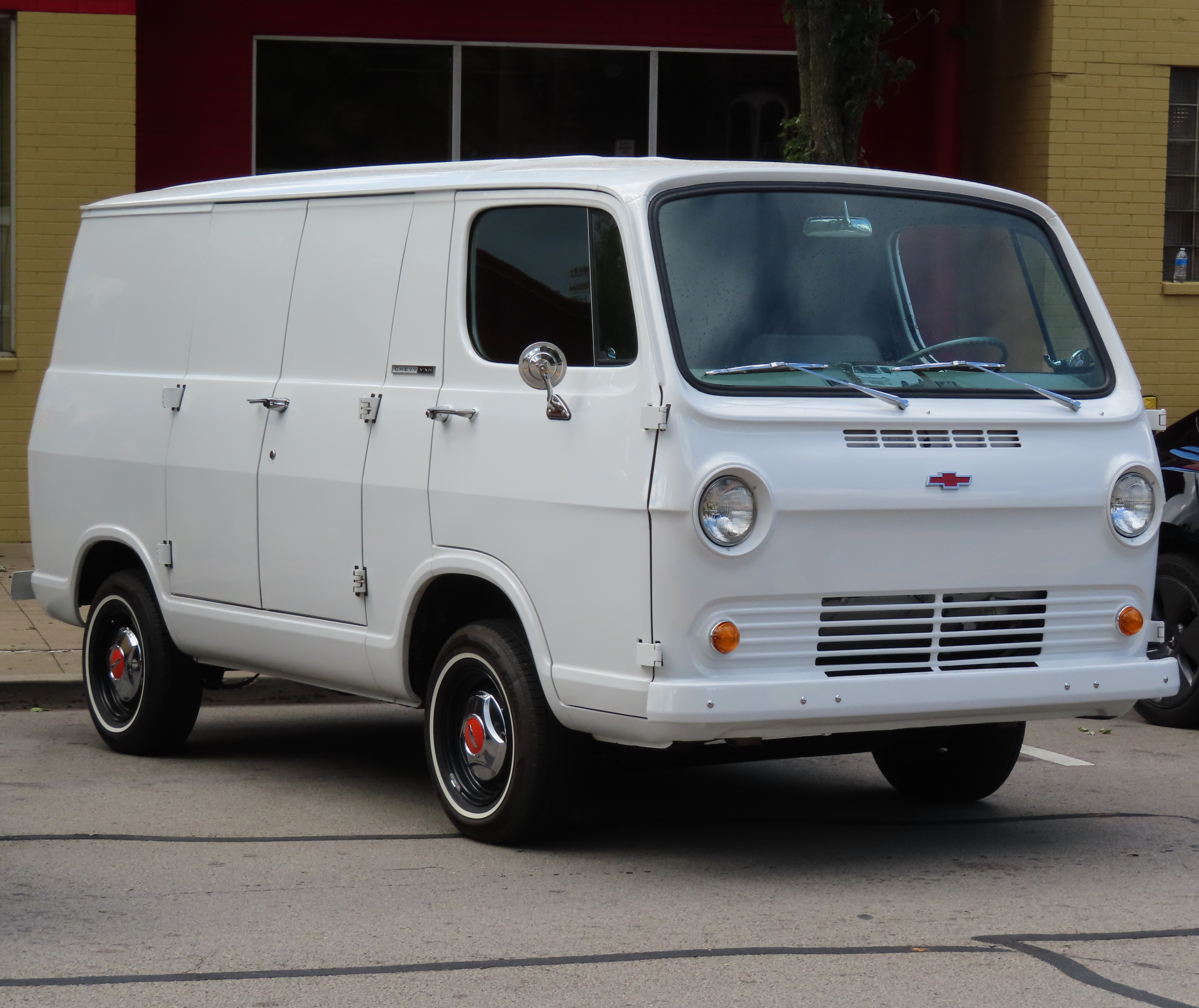
- 1965 Chevrolet Chevy-Van, fitted with optional side cargo doors

Overview
- Manufacturer: Chevrolet
- Also called: Chevrolet Sportvan; GMC Handi-Van; GMC Handi-Bus
- Production: 1964–1966
- Model years: 1964-1966
- Assembly: Pontiac, Michigan, U.S.

Body and chassis
- Layout: FMR layout

Powertrain
- Engine: 153 cu in (2.5 L) I4; 194 cu in (3.2 L) I6; 230 cu in (3.8 L) I6
- Transmission: 3-speed manual 2-speed Powerglide automatic

Dimensions
- Wheelbase: 90 in (2,286 mm)
- Length: 167.5 in (4,254 mm)
- Width: 72.8 in (1,849 mm)
- Height: 77.3 in (1,963 mm)

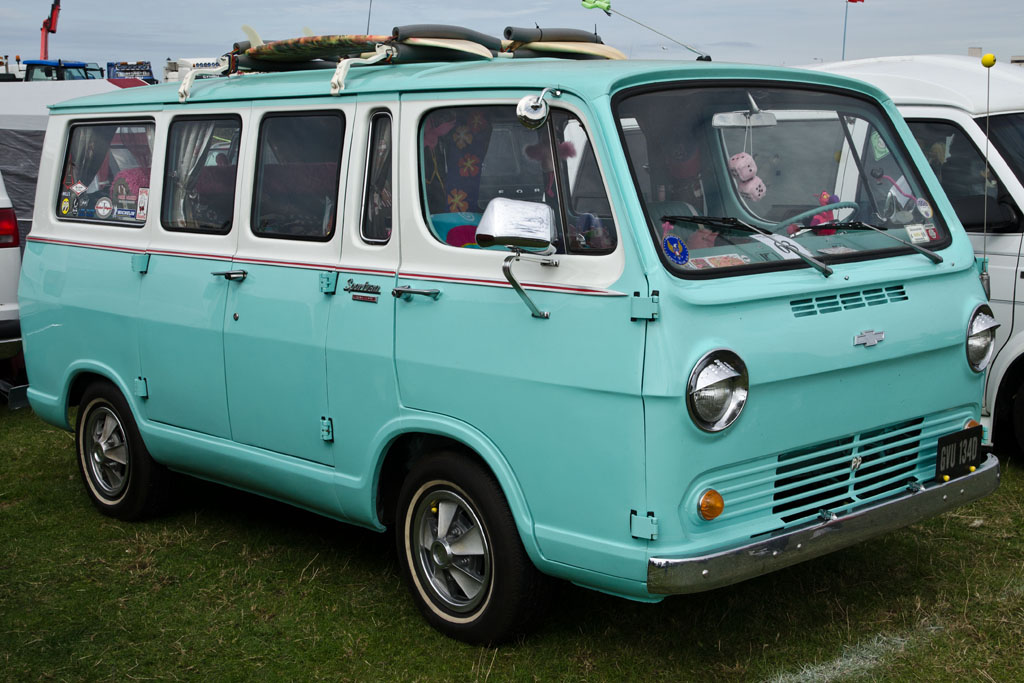
1966 Chevrolet Sportvan; GMC Handi-Bus is nearly identical

For 1964, GM released its compact van developed to replace the Corvair 95. Internally coded the G-10, the half-ton van adopted a design closer to the Econoline and A100 (sharing their 90-inch wheelbase), moving the engine from behind the rear axle to between the front seats (the body remained a forward-control design, placing the driver above the front axle). In a larger change, the model line was marketed by both Chevrolet and GMC, with both divisions marketing passenger and cargo variants. Alongside the Chevy Van sold for cargo, Chevrolet also sold the Sportvan passenger version; GMC marketed the Handi-Van and Handi-Bus, respectively.

In line with its predecessor sharing components with the Corvair, the G10 shared mechanical commonality with the Chevy II. The standard engine was a 153 cu in (2.5 L) High Torque 153 inline-4, producing 90 hp; a 194 cu in (3.2 L) High Torque 194 inline-6 was optional. A 3-speed column-shifted manual transmission was standard, with a 2-speed Powerglide automatic offered as an option.

Though sharing its powertrains with the Chevy II, the chassis was designed with a full-length unibody and used an I-beam front suspension and much heavier-duty rear leaf springs than a sedan (similar in design to GMC trucks). While visually similar to its Corvair predecessor, the Chevy-Van was distinguished by its larger, flat windshield, twin headlights (instead of four), and the relocation of the grille to above the bumper (providing an air intake for the engine). From the rear, the lack of a rear engine allowed the cargo doors to extend down to the bumper.

=== 1964 ===
For 1964, the model line was offered solely as the Chevy-Van cargo van; though assigned as part of a half-ton payload series, the model line was capable of up to 2000 pounds of payload. To maximize interior space, the model line was sold only with a driver seat as standard equipment (the optional passenger seat folded for storage); the base version was sold with only rear cargo doors (right-side cargo doors were offered as options). Other extra-cost options included a heater, two-speed windshield wipers, and the dashboard glovebox.

=== 1965 ===
Coinciding with Chevrolet phasing out the Greenbrier line, the G10 was expanded to include a passenger van, including the Chevrolet Sportvan (GMC Handi-Bus). In addition to a standard front passenger seat, the Sportvan was fitted with two optional rear bench seats, expanding seating capacity to eight. The cargo van saw minor changes, with side windows added as an option. In another minor change, seatbelts were no longer optional.

The four-cylinder engine remained the standard engine for cargo vehicles, but a second engine (shared with both the Chevy II and the C/K line) was added as an option. The High Torque 230 cu in (3.8 L) inline-6 (making 140 hp) was an option for both the Sportvan and the Chevy-Van; the 194 inline-6 was offered as the standard engine for the Sportvan.

=== 1966 ===
Visually unchanged from before, the G10 underwent several changes to its equipment offerings. In a powertrain change, the inline-4 was dropped from the Chevy-Van, making the 194 inline-6 the standard engine.

== Second generation (1967–1970) ==
Second generation
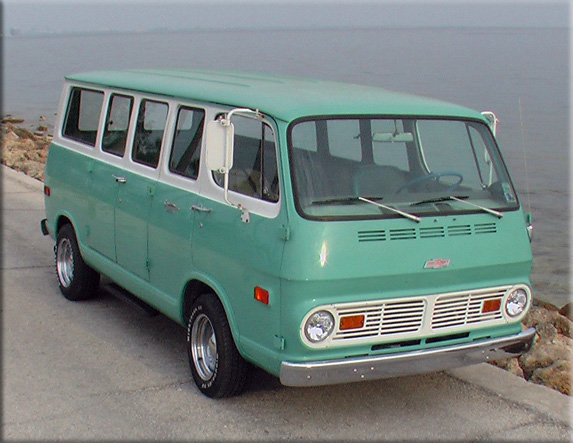
- 1968 Chevrolet Sportvan

Overview
- Manufacturer: Chevrolet
- Model code: G10, G20
- Also called: Chevrolet Sportvan; GMC Handi-Van; GMC Handi-Bus
- Production: 1967–1970
- Model years: 1967–1970
- Assembly: Pontiac, Michigan, U.S.

Body and chassis
- Class: Van
- Body style: 3-door cargo van 4-door cargo van 4-door passenger van
- Layout: FMR layout

Powertrain
- Engine: 230 cu in (3.8 L) I6; 250 cu in (4.1 L) I6; 283 cu in (4.6 L) V8; 307 cu in (5.0 L) V8; 350 cu in (5.7 L) V8

Dimensions
- Wheelbase: SWB: 90 in (2,286 mm); LWB: 108 in (2,743 mm)
- Length: SWB: 171 in (4,343 mm); LWB: 189 in (4,801 mm)

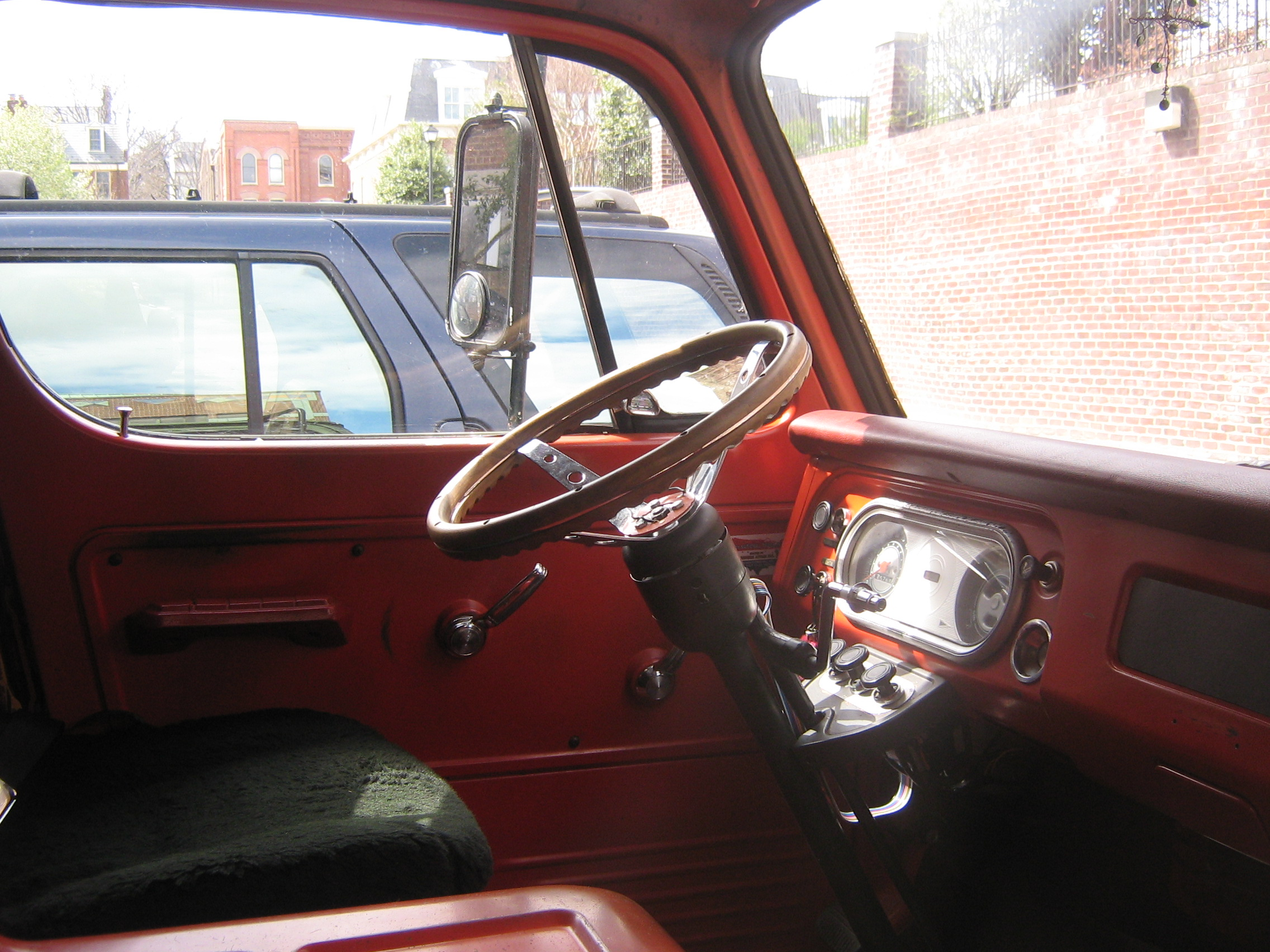
Driver's seat, second-generation Chevrolet G-series van

GMC Handi-Bus 108

For 1967, the second-generation G-series vans were introduced by Chevrolet and GMC. In a central part of the redesign, the ½-ton G10 was joined by the ¾-ton G20, with a 108-inch wheelbase body offered as an option for both passenger and cargo vans. Sharing a strong visual resemblance to the first generation, the second-generation G-series underwent a redesign of the front bodywork to improve aerodynamics and engine ventilation; an enlarged windshield was fitted with curved glass.

In addition to expanding the commonality of the line with the C/K-series, the introduction of the G20 followed the retirement of the Suburban panel van

The G-series vans again continued the use of a uniframe platform, integrating full-length frame rails into the structure of the unibody; to upgrade the structural integrity of the body, the body was assembled with single-piece body-side stampings. G10 vehicles were produced in both 90-inch and 108-inch wheelbases; G20 examples were available only in the longer 108-inch version. The G10 is externally visible by its 5-lug wheels (5x4.75" pattern); along with its 12-bolt rear-axle, the G20 uses 6-lug wheels.

=== 1967-1968 ===
Under the internal G10/G20 coding, the model line was again offered as the Chevy-Van and Sportvan (with 90/108 suffixes, denoting their wheelbase), with GMC retaining the Handi-Van and Handi-Bus nameplates, respectively. Alongside the upgraded "Custom" interior option for both the Chevy-Van, the Sportvan received a "Deluxe" option with further upgrades to its interior; both the Sportvan 90 and the Sportvan 108 were offered with two optional rear seats, again expanding capacity to 8. While air conditioning and power steering were never offered for the second generation, the redesign standardized previously optional features including a heater, 2-speed windshield wipers, and a dashboard glovebox; the front passenger seat remained an option for the Chevy-Van.

To accommodate its new V8 engine option (see below), the front bodywork was fitted with a larger, wider grille (housing the headlamps); while its design saw few major changes, the rear bodywork was fitted with larger taillamps. In compliance with federal regulations, the model line was upgraded to a dual-circuit braking system with a twin-reservoir master cylinder. In a first, power brakes became offered as an option (for G20 vehicles).

For 1968. several safety revisions were made. In compliance with FMVSS 108, the G10/G20 was fitted with side marker lights and reflectors, adding red marker lights on the rear quarter panels (behind the rear axle) and amber marker lights on the lower front doors. In a visible change, a sideview mirror became standard for both doors across the entire model line. In response to the addition of an optional V8, the fuel tank was increased in size (from 16 gallons to 24.5 gallons).

=== 1969-1970 ===
After 1968, the second-generation G-series was largely carryover (with the exception of the powertrain).

=== Powertrain details ===
A central part of the 1967 redesign was a shift in powertrain commonality from the Chevy II/Nova towards the C/K truck line. From 1967 to 1969, the standard engine was the 230 cubic-inch inline-6, producing 140 hp (the largest engine of the previous generation). A 250 cubic-inch (High Torque 250) inline-6 was an option, producing 155 hp. A V8 was made an option for the first time: a 2-barrel Chevrolet 283 cubic-inch V8 (High Torque 283), producing 175 hp. To accommodate the larger engines, a heavy-duty radiator was added as an option.

For 1968, the 283 V8 was replaced by a 307 cubic-inch V8 (High Torque 307), increasing output to 200 hp. For 1970, the 230 inline-6 was retired in North America, making the 250 inline-6 standard alongside the optional 307 V8. Though a 4-barrel 350 V8 was referenced in the owners manual for 1970, it was not mentioned elsewhere.

Initially, all three engines were paired with either a 3-speed manual or a 2-speed Powerglide automatic; for 1968, a 4-speed manual (Borg-Warner T10) became optional (retaining a column shifter). For 1969, the Turbo-Hydramatic 3-speed automatic became an option (alongside the Powerglide).

== Third generation (1971–1996) ==
Third generation
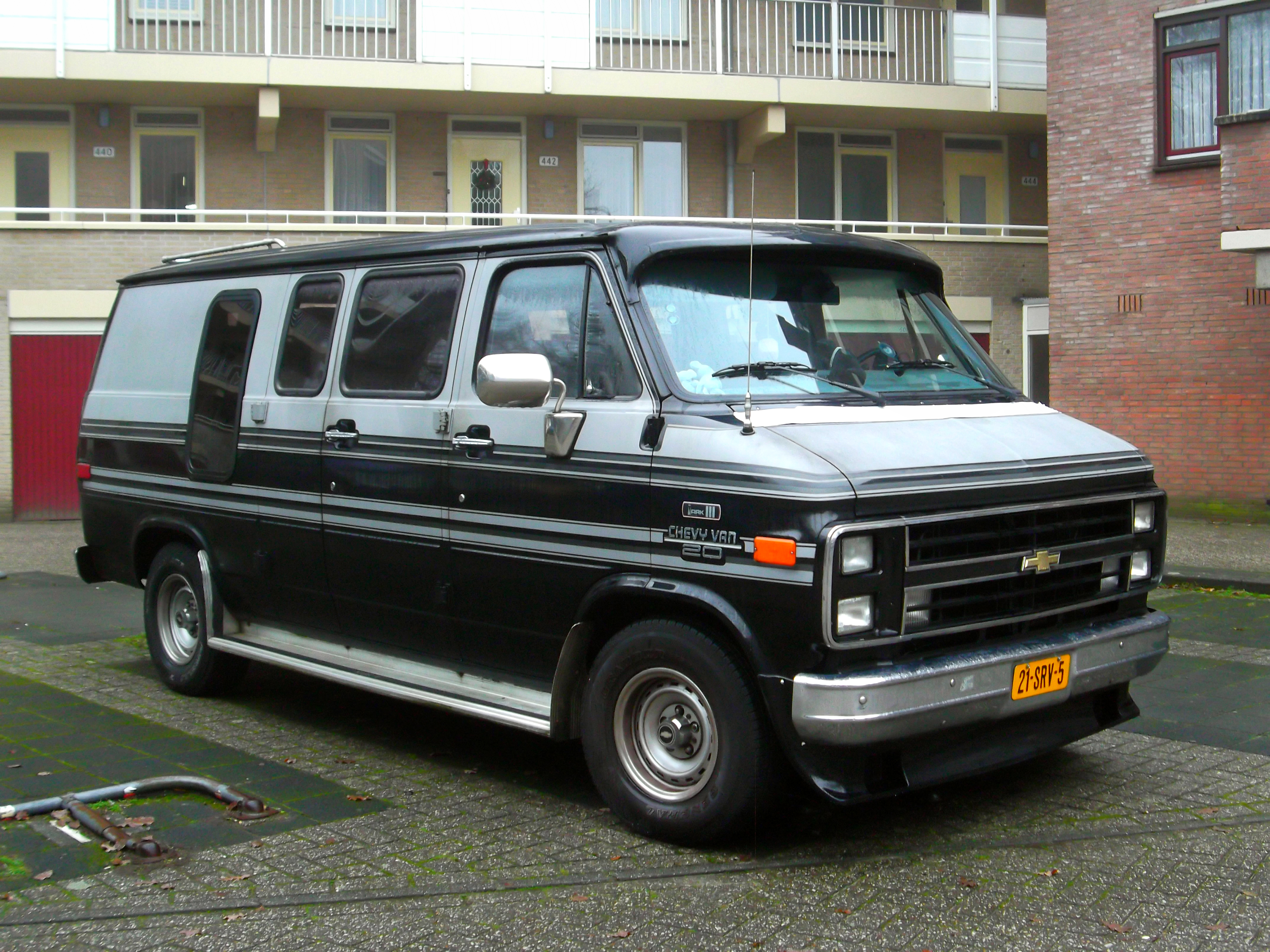
- 1986 Chevrolet G20 conversion van

Overview
- Manufacturer: Chevrolet
- Also called: Chevrolet Sportvan; GMC Vandura; GMC Rally
- Production: April 1970 – June 1996
- Model years: 1971–1996
- Assembly: Lordstown, Ohio, United States (Lordstown Assembly: 1971–1992); Flint, Michigan, United States (Flint Truck Assembly: 1993–1996); Detroit, Michigan, United States (Chevrolet Detroit Truck & Bus Plant: 1993–1996 G30 HD/G3500 HD only); Scarborough, Ontario, Canada (Scarborough Van Assembly: 1974–1993)

Body and chassis
- Class: Full-size van
- Body style: 3-door van 3+1 door wagon 4-door van
- Layout: Front-engine, rear-wheel drive
- Related: Chevrolet/GMC C/K

Powertrain
- Engine: 250 cu in (4.1 L) I6 (1971–84); 292 cu in (4.8 L) I6 (1975–78); 262 cu in (4.3 L) V6 (1985–96); 305 cu in (5.0 L) V8 (1976–95); 307 cu in (5.0 L) V8 (1971–73); 350 cu in (5.7 L) V8 (1971–96); 400 cu in (6.6 L) V8 (1976–80); 454 cu in (7.4 L) V8 (1988–96); 379 cu in (6.2 L) diesel V8 (1982–93); 395 cu in (6.5 L) diesel V8 (1994–96)
- Transmission: 2-speed Powerglide automatic 3-speed automatic 4-speed automatic 3-speed manual 4-speed manual

Dimensions
- Wheelbase: 110 in (2,794 mm) (SWB); 125 in (3,175 mm) (LWB); 146 in (3,708 mm) (EWB)
- Length: 178.2 in (4,526 mm) (SWB); 202.2 in (5,136 mm) (LWB); 223.2 in (5,669 mm) (EWB)
- Width: 79.5 in (2,019 mm)
- Height: 79.4 in (2,017 mm) (SWB); 79.2 in (2,012 mm) (LWB); 79.8 in (2,027 mm) (SWB); 81.9 in (2,080 mm) (LWB)

In April 1970, GM introduced the third-generation G-series vans as 1971 model-year vehicles. In a complete redesign of the model line, the vans adopted a front-engine configuration (adding a hood to the body). While using a unibody chassis, the third-generation vans derived mechanical components from the second- and third-generation C/K pickup trucks.

Initial advertising in 1970 emphasized interior space, with the tagline "Chevrolet launches the space vehicle." It is a nod to the U.S. space program, with the vehicle appearing vertically on page, imitating a rocket launch.

In production for 25 years, the third-generation G-series vans became one of the longest-produced vehicle platforms designed by General Motors.

=== Chassis ===
In line with the two previous generations, the third-generation G-series vans again used unibody construction, integrating the frame rails into the floorpan; the side panels were constructed of a single-piece stamping. The model line was offered three wheelbase lengths: 110 inches, 125 inches, and 146 inches. From 1971 to 1989, the 146-inch wheelbase was used for cutaway chassis; for 1990, a single-rear-wheel version was introduced for an extended-length van body.

The front suspension underwent an extensive design change, deleting its leaf-sprung front axle; in line with C-series pickup trucks, the vans received independent front suspension with coil springs and control arms (allowing for much wider spacing of the front wheels). The rear axle suspension largely remained the same, retaining a leaf-sprung solid rear axle.

The four-wheel drum brakes of the previous generation were abandoned, as the third-generation G-series vans adopted front disc brakes. The front disc/rear drum configuration remained unchanged throughout the entire production of the model line; heavier-duty vehicles received larger brakes. For 1993, four-wheel anti-lock braking was added as a standard feature.

==== Powertrain ====
For its 1971 introduction, the G-series model line was offered with three different engines. A 250 cubic-inch inline-6 and two V8 engines were offered. On the 1/2-ton vehicles, a 307 cubic-inch V8 was optional, with a 350 cubic-inch V8 offered as an option on 3/4-ton and 1-ton vans. Alongside a 3-speed manual transmission, the 2-speed Powerglide was offered alongside the 3-speed Turbo-Hydromatic automatic. After 1972, the Powerglide automatic was dropped.

For 1974, the 307 was discontinued, replaced by a two-barrel 350 V8 in 1/2-ton vans. For 1976, the powertrain line was expanded, with the 292 inline-6 becoming the standard engine in 3/4-ton and 1-ton vans; a 305 V8 replaced the 350 two-barrel in 1/2-ton vans (becoming an option for both 1/2-ton and 3/4-ton vans in 1981) and a 400 cubic-inch V8 became offered in 3/4 and 1-ton vans.

As part of the 1978 model update, the powertrain line underwent further revisions, with the 292 six dropped from G-series vans entirely; GM began the use of metric displacement figures. In line with its use in the C/K trucks, the 400 V8 was dropped from the G-series for 1981.

For 1982, a 6.2 L V8 became the first diesel engine option offered in the (3/4-ton and 1-ton) G-series. Shared with the C/K pickup trucks, an overdrive version of the Turbo-Hydramatic was introduced, adding a fourth gear.

In line with the C/K pickup trucks, a 4.3L V6 replaced the long-running 4.1L inline-6 as the standard engine for 1985. For 1987, the four-barrel carburetor for the V6 was replaced by throttle-body fuel injection (TBI), with the 5.0L and 5.7L V8s following suit. Alongside three-speed and four-speed manual transmissions, the G-series vans were offered with three-speed and four-speed automatic transmissions.

For 1988, a fuel-injected 7.4L V8 was introduced as an option for the 3500 series, becoming the first big-block V8 offered for the model line. For 1990, manual transmissions were discontinued and the four-speed automatic became standard equipment on nearly all body configurations; for 1992, the 4L60E and 4L80E four-speed automatics replaced the three-speed automatics entirely.

While the gasoline engine offerings would remain largely unchanged after the 1988 model year, the 6.2 L diesel was enlarged to 6.5 L for 1994, with only a naturally-aspirated version offered for the G-series vans.

For 1996, offered only as a 1-ton G30 payload series, the "G-Classic" van continued the use of non-Vortec engines. The 5.7L V8 was now standard (dropping the 5.0L altogether), with the 4.3L V6 as an option only on standard-wheelbase vans. The 7.4L V8 and 6.5L diesel V8 remained options.

Engine	Engine family	Production	Notes
250 cu in (4.1 L) inline-6	Chevrolet straight-6	1971–1984	Initial standard engine on all payload series
262 cu in (4.3 L) V6	Chevrolet 90° V6	1985–1996	Replaced 4.1L I6 as standard engine
292 cu in (4.8 L) inline-6	Chevrolet straight-6	1975–1978	Replaced 250 I6 as standard engine on 3/4-ton and 1-ton vans
305 cu in (5.0 L) V8	Chevrolet small-block V8	1976–1995	Replaced 350 2bbl in 1/2-ton vans Optional on 1/2-ton and 3/4-ton vans from 1981 to 1995
307 cu in (5.0 L) V8	Chevrolet small-block V8	1971–1973	Optional on 1/2-ton vans
350 cu in (5.7 L) V8	Chevrolet small-block V8	1971–1996	Optional on all payload series 2-bbl version replaced 307 in 1/2-ton vans
379 cu in (6.2 L) V8 diesel	Detroit Diesel V8	1982–1993	Optional on 3/4-ton and 1-ton vans Naturally-aspirated version only
395 cu in (6.5 L) V8 diesel	Detroit Diesel V8	1994–1996	Optional on 3/4-ton and 1-ton vans Naturally-aspirated version only
400 cu in (6.6 L) V8	Chevrolet small-block V8	1976–1980	Optional in 3/4-ton and 1-ton vans
454 cu in (7.4 L) V8	Chevrolet big-block V8 (Mark IV)	1988–1996	First "big-block" V8 engine in G-series van Optional for 1-ton vans and cutaway-cab chassis

=== Body ===
In line with the C/K pickup trucks, the G-series vans were sold in 1/2-ton, 3/4-ton, and 1-ton series by both Chevrolet and GMC, with both divisions marketing passenger and cargo vans. As part of the shift to a front-engine design layout, the body received a conventional hood, allowing for access to the engine from outside of the vehicle.

Prior to 1995, the G-series cargo van was sold with only a driver's seat (with an optional passenger-side seat). Through its production, passenger vans were sold in multiple seating configurations (dependent on wheelbase), ranging from 5 to 15 passengers. Alongside a windowless rear body, the cargo van was offered in several window configurations.

==== 1971–1977 ====
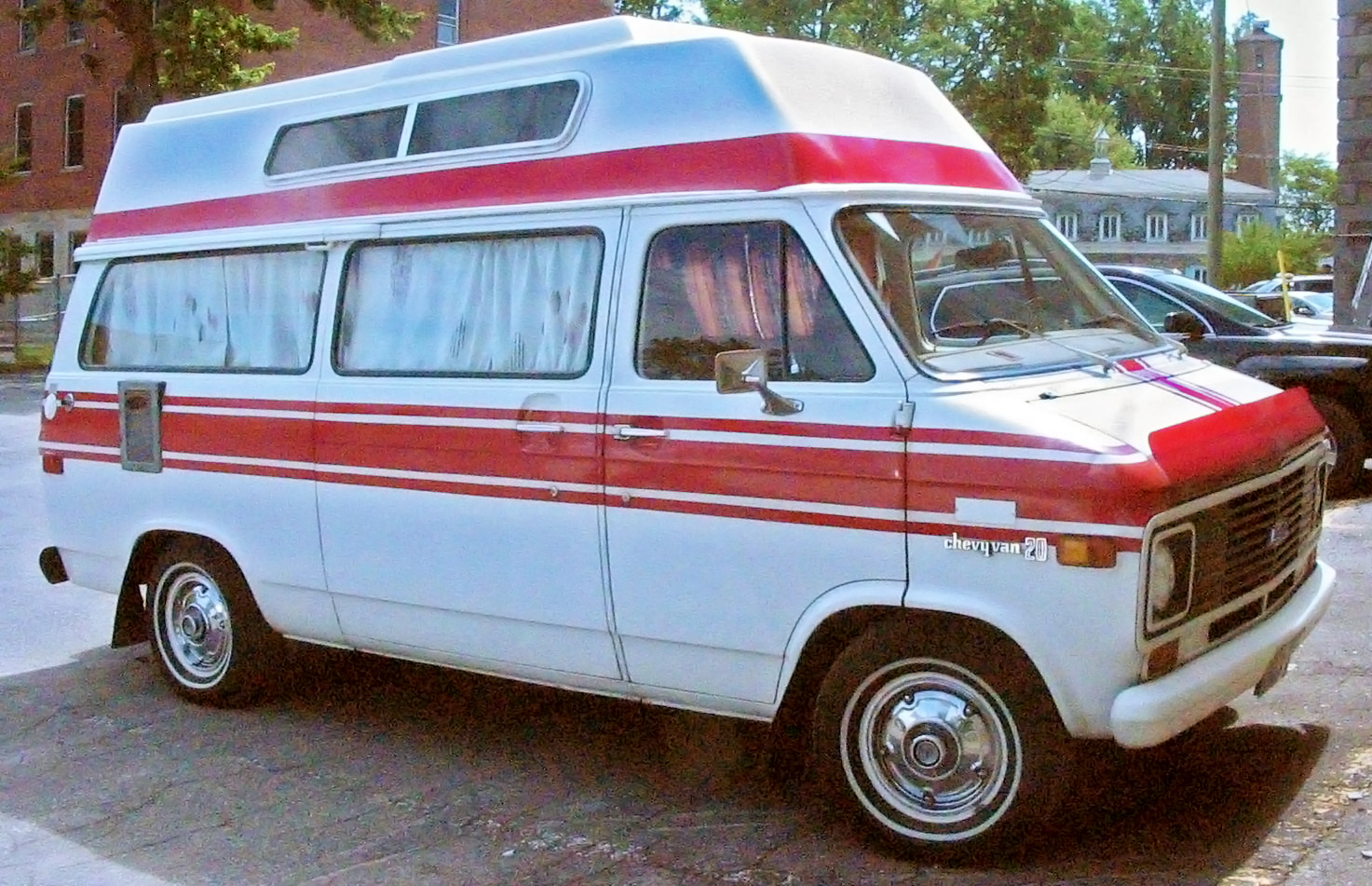
1971 Chevrolet G20 (recreational vehicle)

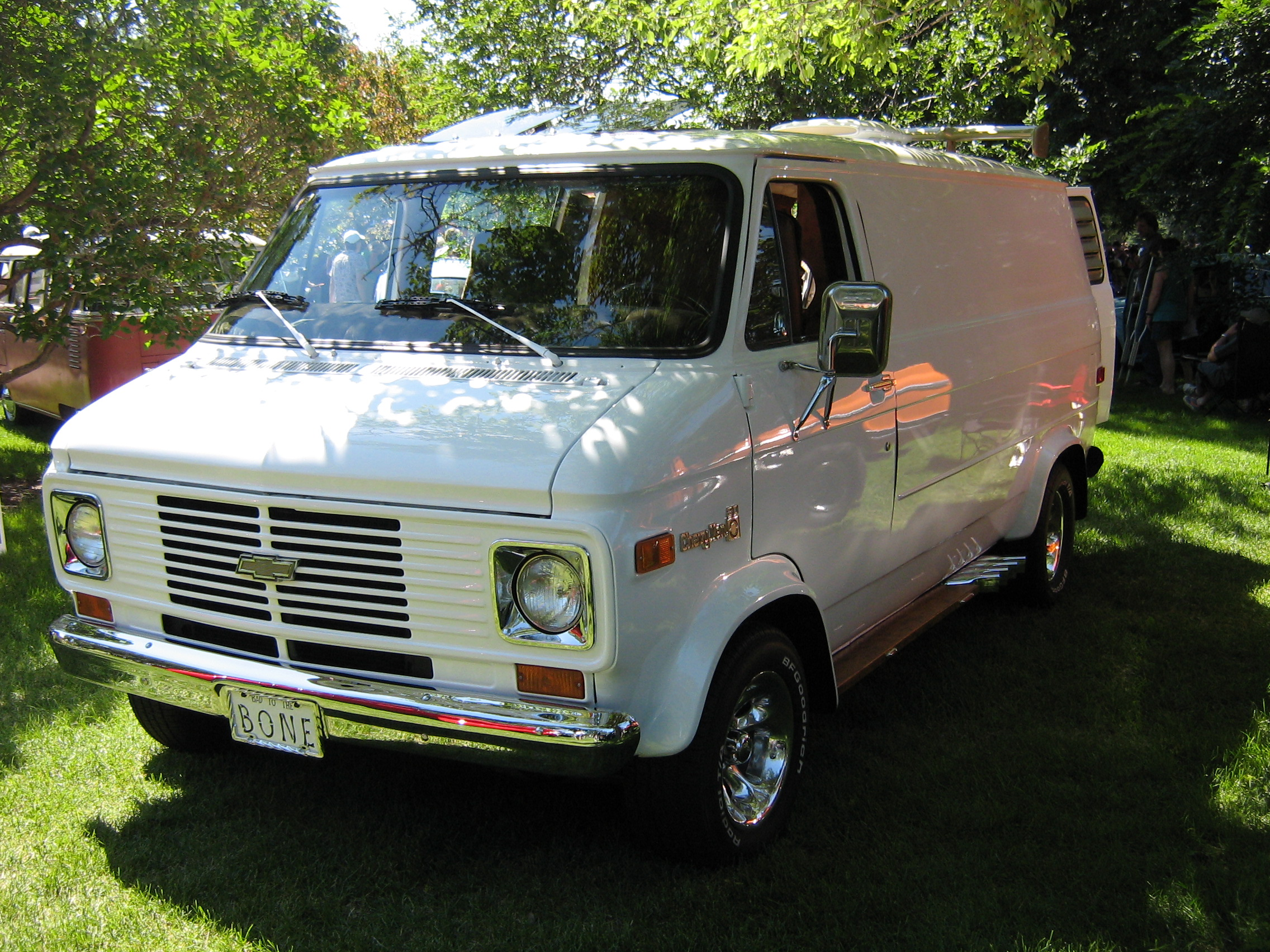
1977 Chevrolet G20 (customized)

The G-series vans differed from one another in divisional badging. Alongside fender badging, Chevrolet badging was centered within the grille while GMC lettering was placed on the hood above the grille. In contrast to the "Action-Line" pickup trucks, the vans are fitted with a horizontal-slat grille. Sharing mechanical commonality with the "Action-Line" pickup trucks, the steering column was sourced from the 1969 update of the C/K series; a large engine cover required a separate design for the dashboard.

For 1973, a minor revision changed the color of the Chevrolet "bowtie" emblem from blue to gold.

For 1974, the steering column and dashboard were updated (to more closely match the introduction of the "Rounded-Line" C/K pickup trucks).

For 1976, the rear bench seats were redesigned in passenger vans, allowing them to be removed without tools.

For 1977, a horizontal body line was introduced past the front doors, while fender and rear door badging were updated to match the design of the C/K pickup trucks.

Offered on a longer wheelbase, a cutaway-chassis conversion of the G-series was marketed through Chevrolet and GMC as a cargo truck, as the Hi-Cube Van and MagnaVan, respectively.

==== 1978–1982 ====
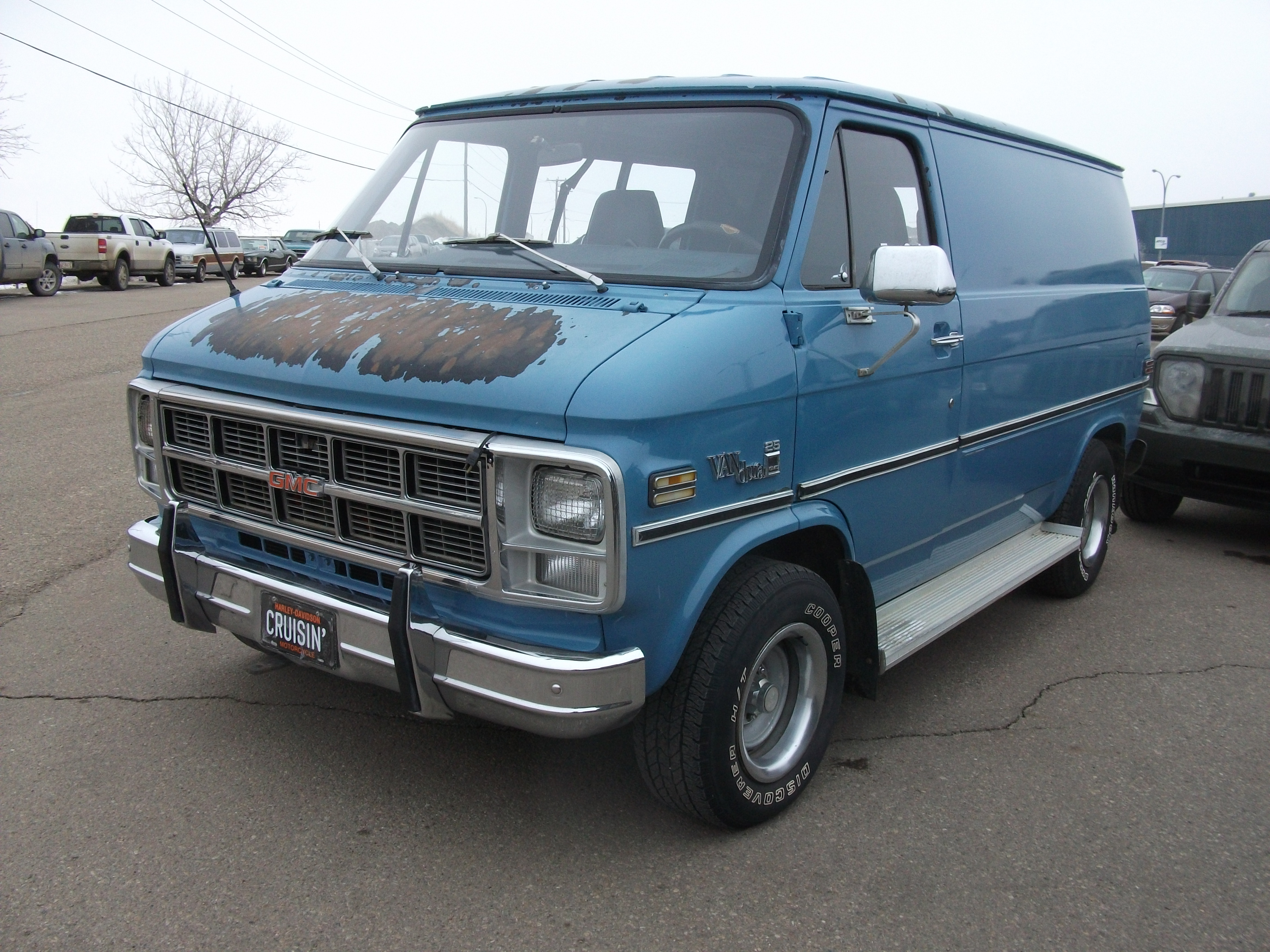
1978–1982 GMC Vandura (110-inch wheelbase)

For 1978, the exterior underwent a revision; along with minor changes to the fenders and the introduction of larger bumpers, the grille was redesigned. More closely matching the "Rounded-Line" C/K pickup trucks in its design, the front fascia was restyled to integrate the headlamps and turn signals into one housing; lower-trim vehicles were offered with round headlamps with square headlamps fitted to higher-trim models. The dashboard was redesigned with recessed gauge pods and an angled center console, a design that would remain in use through 1996.

For 1980, the grille saw a minor revision, adopting larger side-view mirrors for the doors. A locking steering column (with column-mounted ignition switch) was introduced for 1982, with the model line relocating the dimmer switch and wiper controls on the turn signal control stalk. As a one-year-only option, GM offered window glass on the left-side rear door (in place of both rear doors or neither).

==== 1983–1991 ====
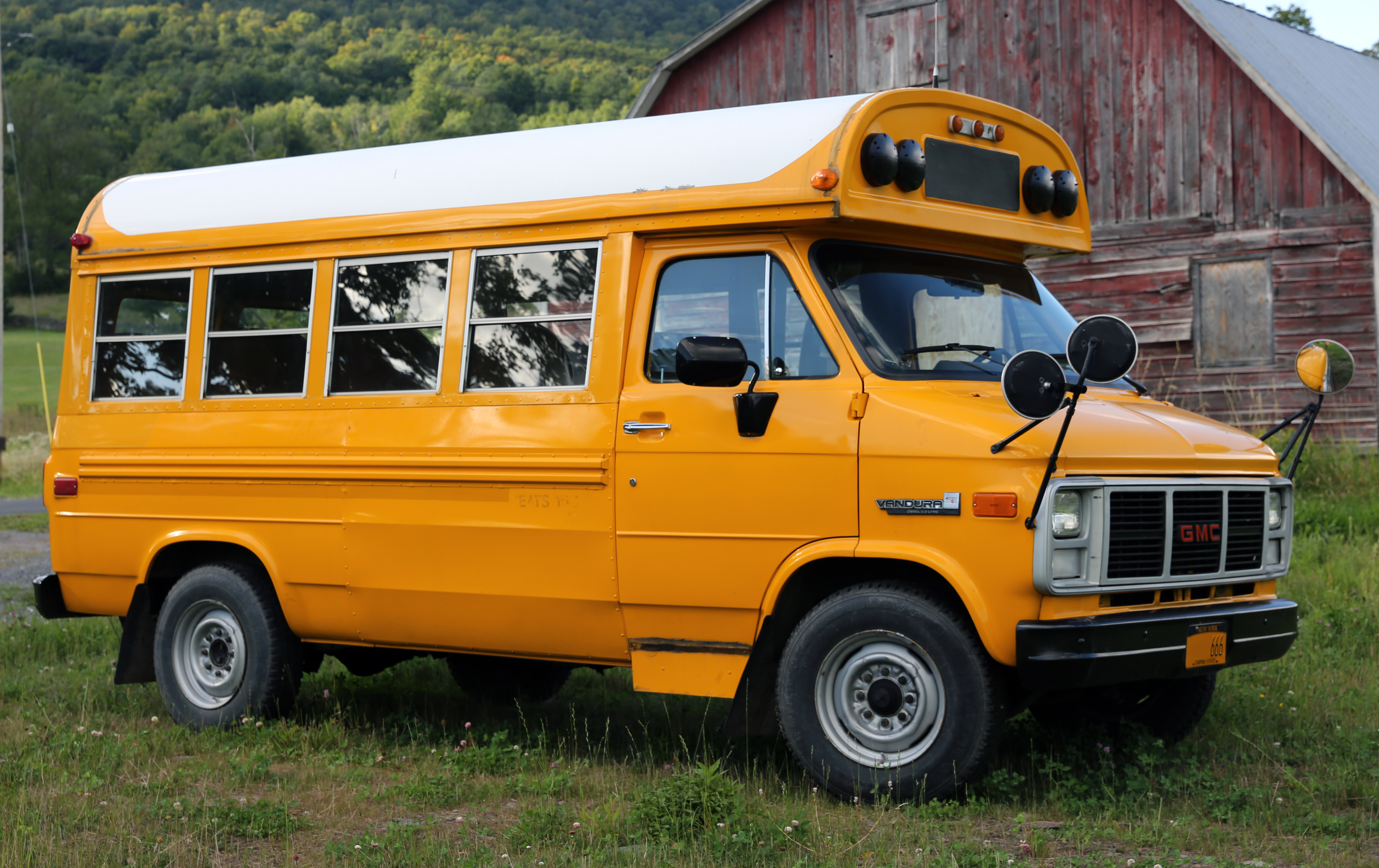
1990 GMC Vandura school bus

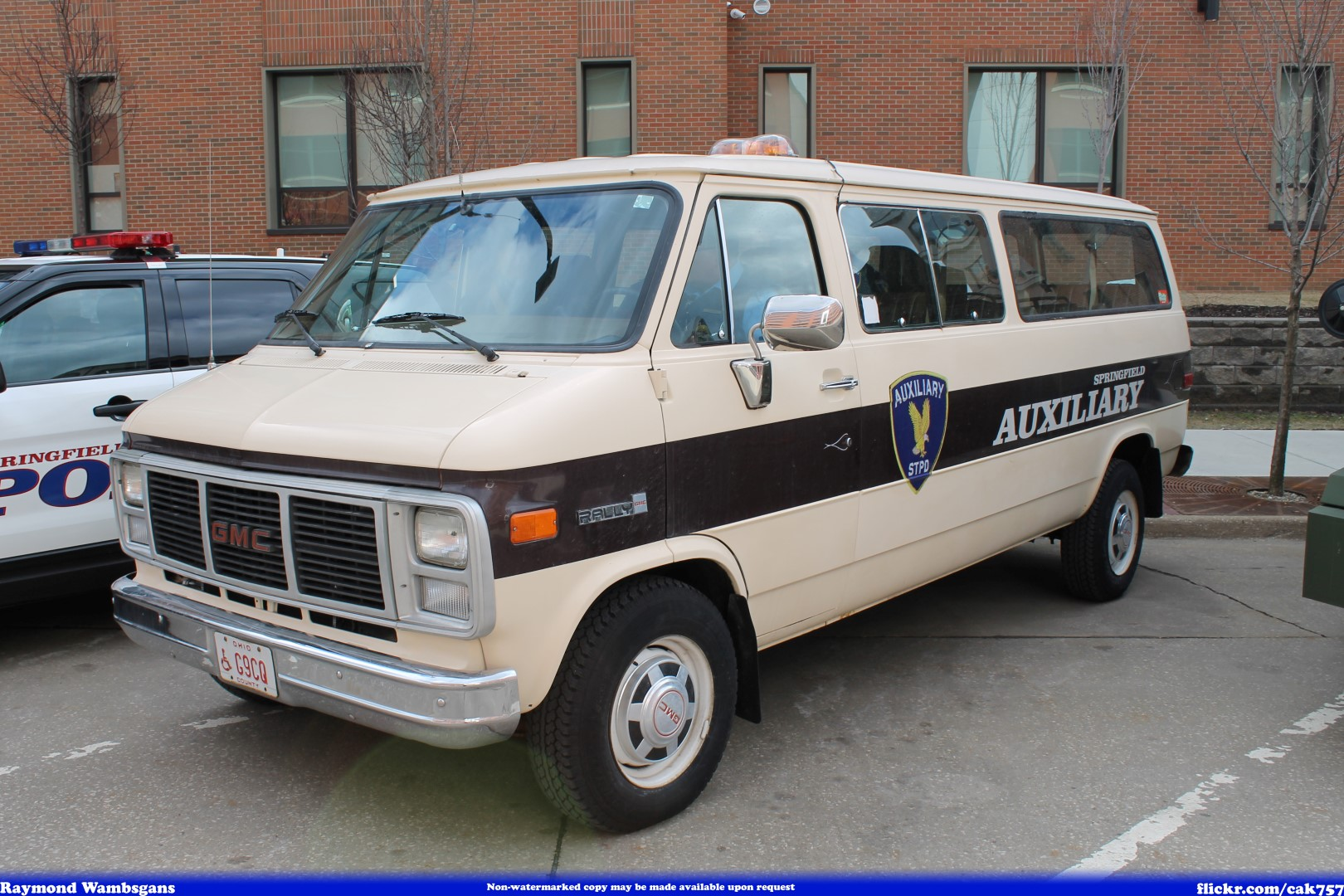
1985–1991 GMC Rally (in police use)

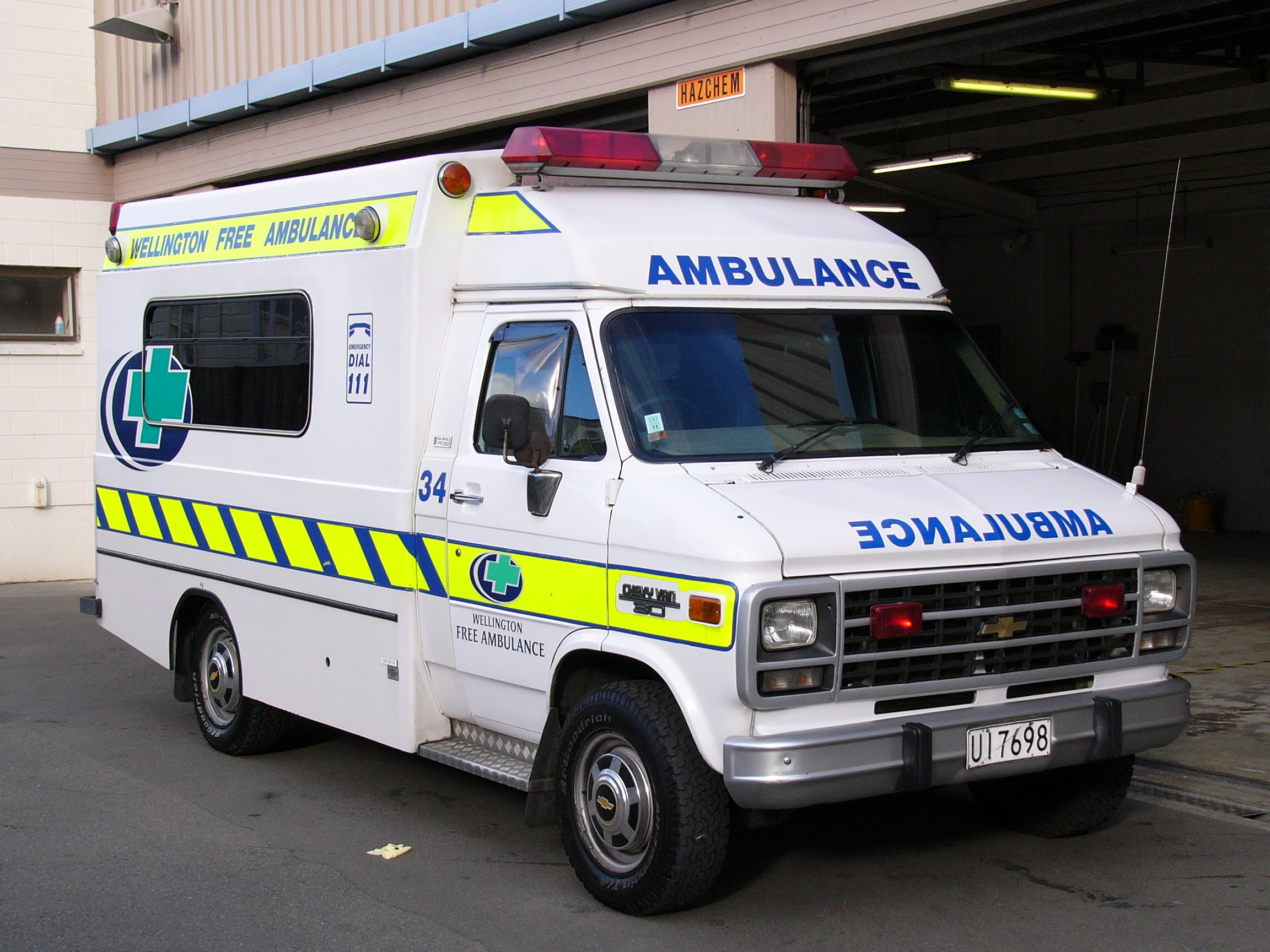
Chevrolet van cab and chassis built as an ambulance

For 1983, the G-series van underwent a set of minor exterior and interior revisions. Alongside the C/K pickup trucks, the grille was redesigned, with Chevrolet receiving a horizontally-split grille and GMC receiving a 6-segment grille; rectangular headlamps were standard on all vehicles. The vans received updated fender badging, with each division receiving its own design (distinct from the C/K series).

While retaining the dashboard from 1978, a new tilt steering column was introduced (sourcing the steering wheel from Chevrolet mid-size sedans), moving the manual transmission shifter from the steering column to the floor.

For 1984, the model line introduced a second side-door configuration, with swing-out side doors (in a 1/3 / 2/3-split) joining the sliding side door as a no-cost option. For 1985, the exterior underwent an update with larger taillamps and side marker lenses while the horizontal body line was added to the front doors; the grille design was derived from the C/K pickup trucks.

For 1990, GM introduced an extended-wheelbase version of the G-series van (on 1-ton series vans). Sharing its 146-inch wheelbase with the Hi-Cube Van/Magnavan, the extended-wheelbase van was the first version of the model line offered with a fourth rear bench seat (5 total rows of seating including first-row driver and front passenger bucket seats), expanding capacity to 15 passengers (previously, the maximum seating capacity was 12 on 4 total rows of seating). While trailing Ford and Dodge by over a decade, the design was the first produced on an extended-wheelbase design. In a minor interior revision, the vans adopted the four-spoke steering wheel from the R/V trucks.

==== 1992–1996 ====
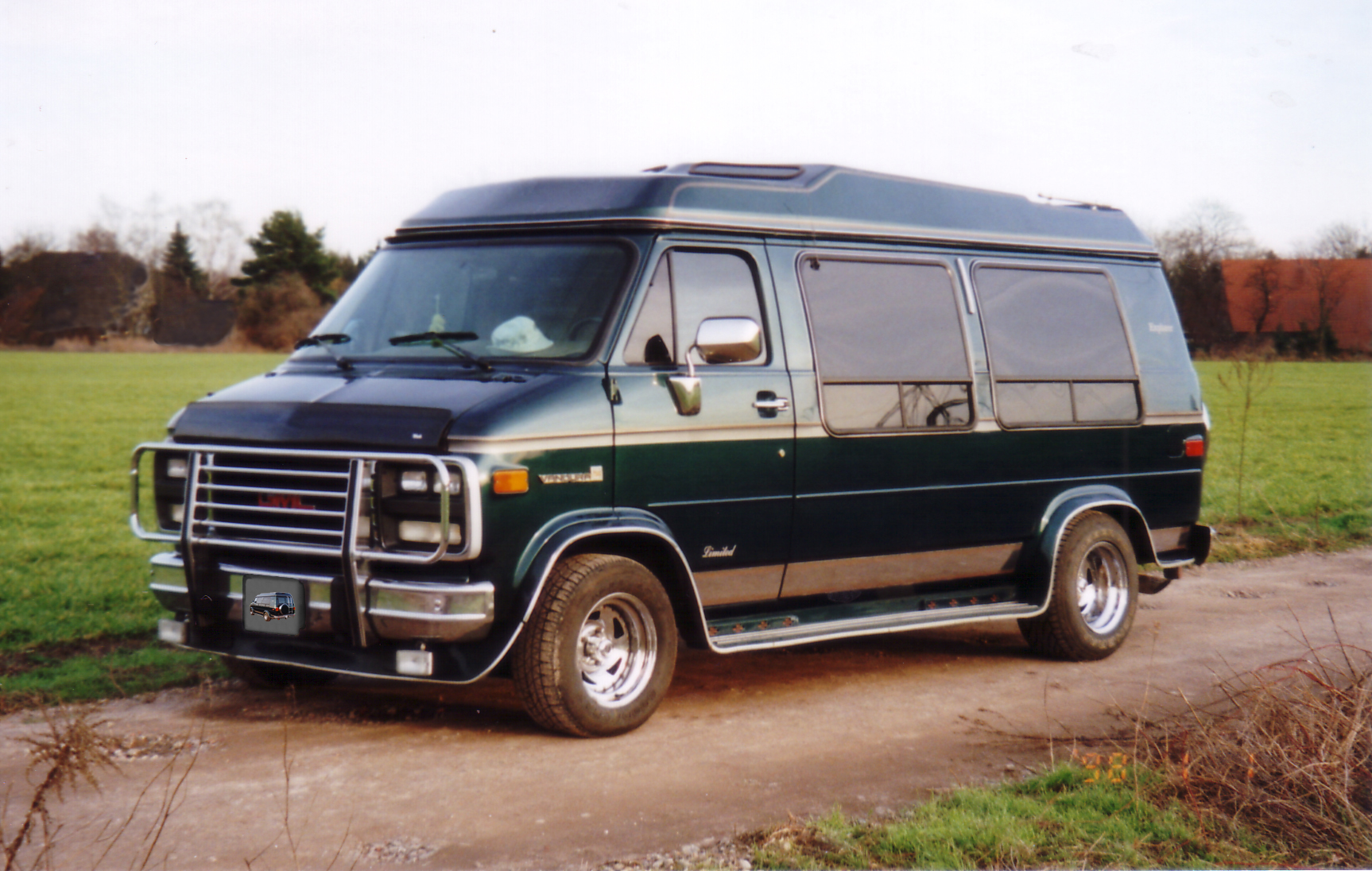
1992–1995 GMC Vandura 2500 conversion van

After seven years largely unchanged, the G-series underwent a minor exterior update for the 1992 model year, bringing the vans in line with the R/V pickup trucks (the final Rounded-Line trucks). In line with previous versions, two headlights remained standard (on cargo vans and lower-trim passenger vans) with four headlights as an option (on higher-trim passenger vans).

Several safety features were phased in during the production of the final model update. For 1993, a brake-shift interlock (requiring the brake pedal to be depressed to shift from park) was introduced. For 1994, a driver's side airbag was added to all vehicles (under 8,500 lbs GVWR); the new steering wheel coincided with the introduction of an updated instrument panel. Center high mount stop lamps were added for 1994 as well, as mandated on light trucks for the model year. In another change, the 1/2-ton passenger van was withdrawn (largely overlapping the Chevrolet Astro/GMC Safari van in size).

For 1993, to bridge the gap between the G-series and the P-series stripped chassis, a heavier-duty version of the G30 cutaway chassis was introduced. Known as the G30 HD/G3500 HD, and distinguished by its extended and forward-tilting nose, the variant was effectively a hybrid of the two model lines, mating the P30 chassis with the G30/3500 bodywork; the model line was developed primarily for recreational vehicle (RV) and bus production.

For the 1996 model year, the third-generation G-series van was renamed the "G-Classic" and was pared down to versions with a GVWR above 8,500 pounds; sales were ended in the state of California. Produced concurrently alongside its GMT600 successor, the final G-series van was produced in June 1996.

=== Trim ===
As with previous generations, the model line was again named the G-series van (distinct from the intermediate GM G platform). Along with the previous 1/2-ton and 3/4-ton nominal payload series, a 1-ton series was offered for the first time.

==== Chevrolet ====
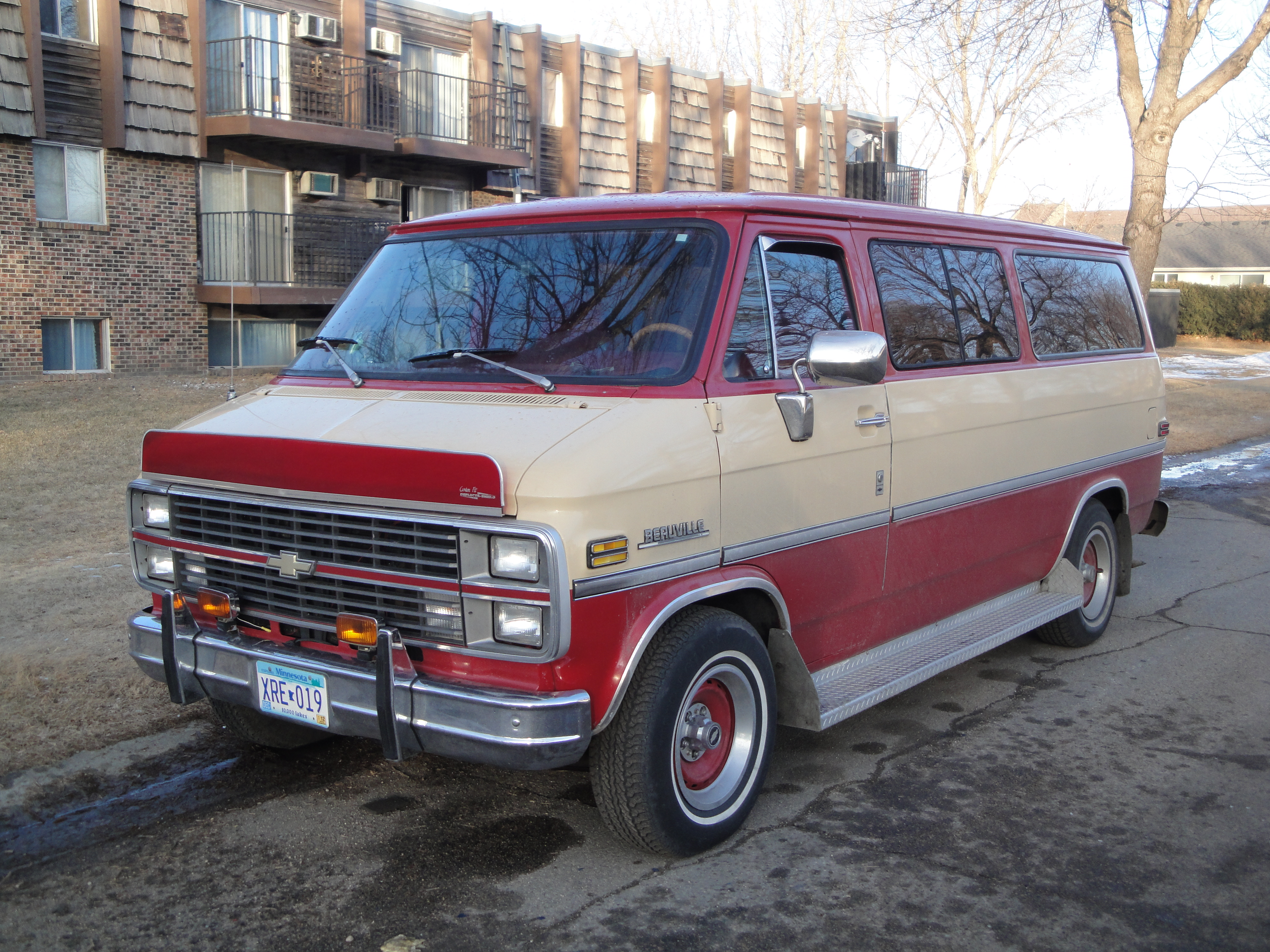
1983 Chevrolet Beauville

Offered in 10, 20, and 30 series, the Chevrolet Chevy Van cargo van and Chevrolet Sportvan passenger van were joined by multiple nameplates through the production of the third generation. Revived from the Tri-Five station wagon series, the Beauville was the highest-trim Chevrolet passenger van; from 1971 to 1996, the model offered offering upgraded seats and interior trim over the Sportvan. During the 1980s, the Bonaventure served as an intermediate trim between the Sportvan and the Beauville.

From 1977 to 1981, the G-series van carried the Chevrolet Nomad nameplate (for the final time). A hybrid of the cargo and passenger vans, the five-passenger Nomad combined the interior trim of the Beauville with a large rear cargo area, finished with a paneled interior. The two-seat Caravan variant (produced from 1977 to 1980) was a trim package developed for van customization, fitted with a paneled interior and rubber floor mat, along with a rear roof vent.

Conversion vans were outfitted on a second-party basis. Derived from the cargo van, such vehicles were badged using the Chevy Van/GMC Vandura nameplates.

==== GMC ====
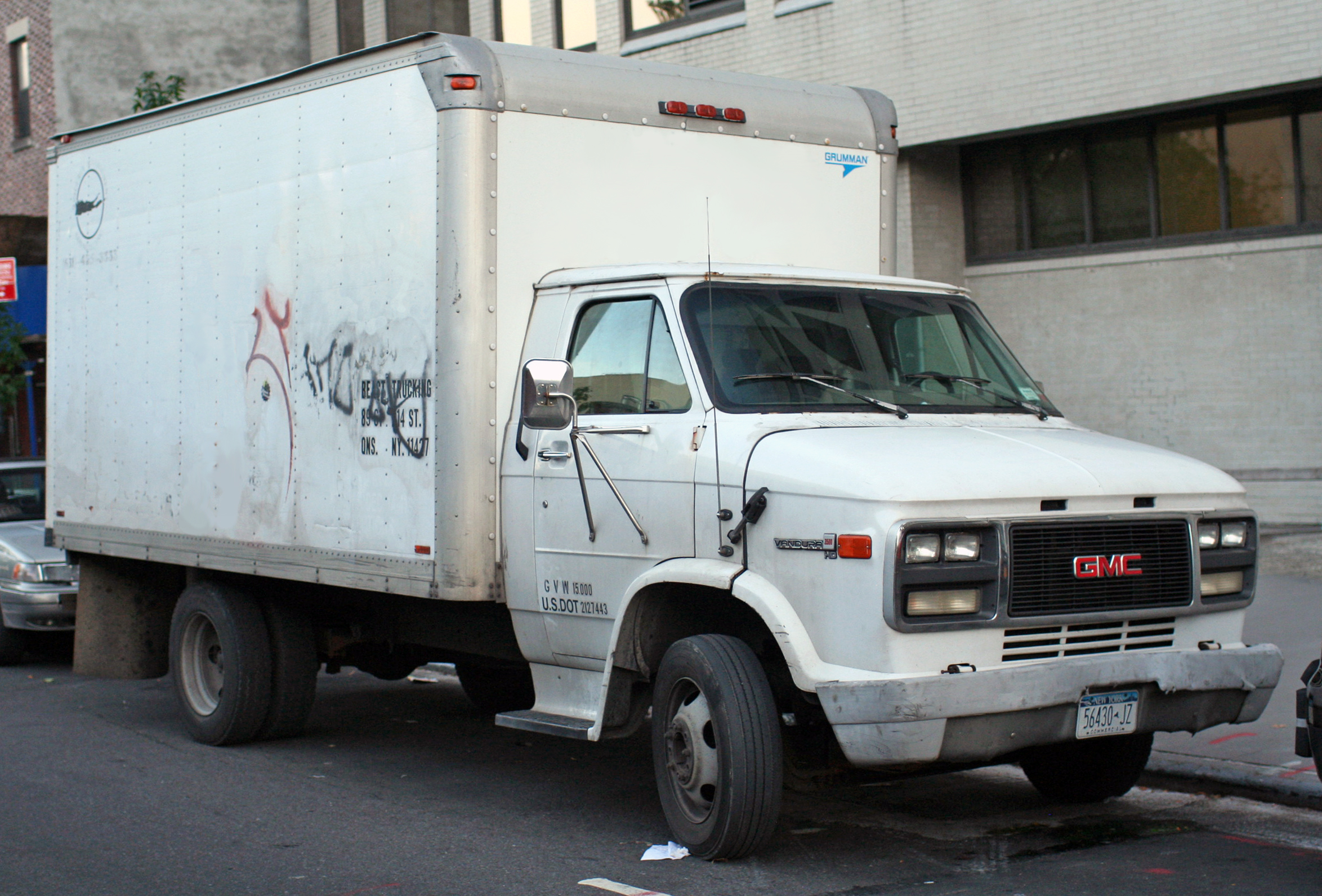
1995 GMC Vandura 3500HD, showing tilting hood section

Offered in 1500, 2500, and 3500 series, the GMC Vandura cargo van and GMC Rally passenger van were the GMC counterparts of the Chevrolet Chevy Van and Sport Van. From 1977 to 1982, the Vandura badging was stylized as GMC VANdura. In line with the GMC Sierra pickup truck, the Rally passenger van was produced across multiple trim levels, with the Rally Custom and Rally STX matching the Bonaventure and Beauville, respectively.

Alongside the Chevrolet Nomad, the GMC Gaucho was a five-passenger van with a large cargo area; the GMC Gypsy was a two-passenger package intended for owner customization.

Derived from the cargo van, cutaway van chassis were badged as Vanduras (and Chevy Vans). Based exclusively on the 1-ton payload series, the variant was fitted with either a single- or dual-rear-wheel axle.

== Fourth generation (1996-present) ==
Fourth generation
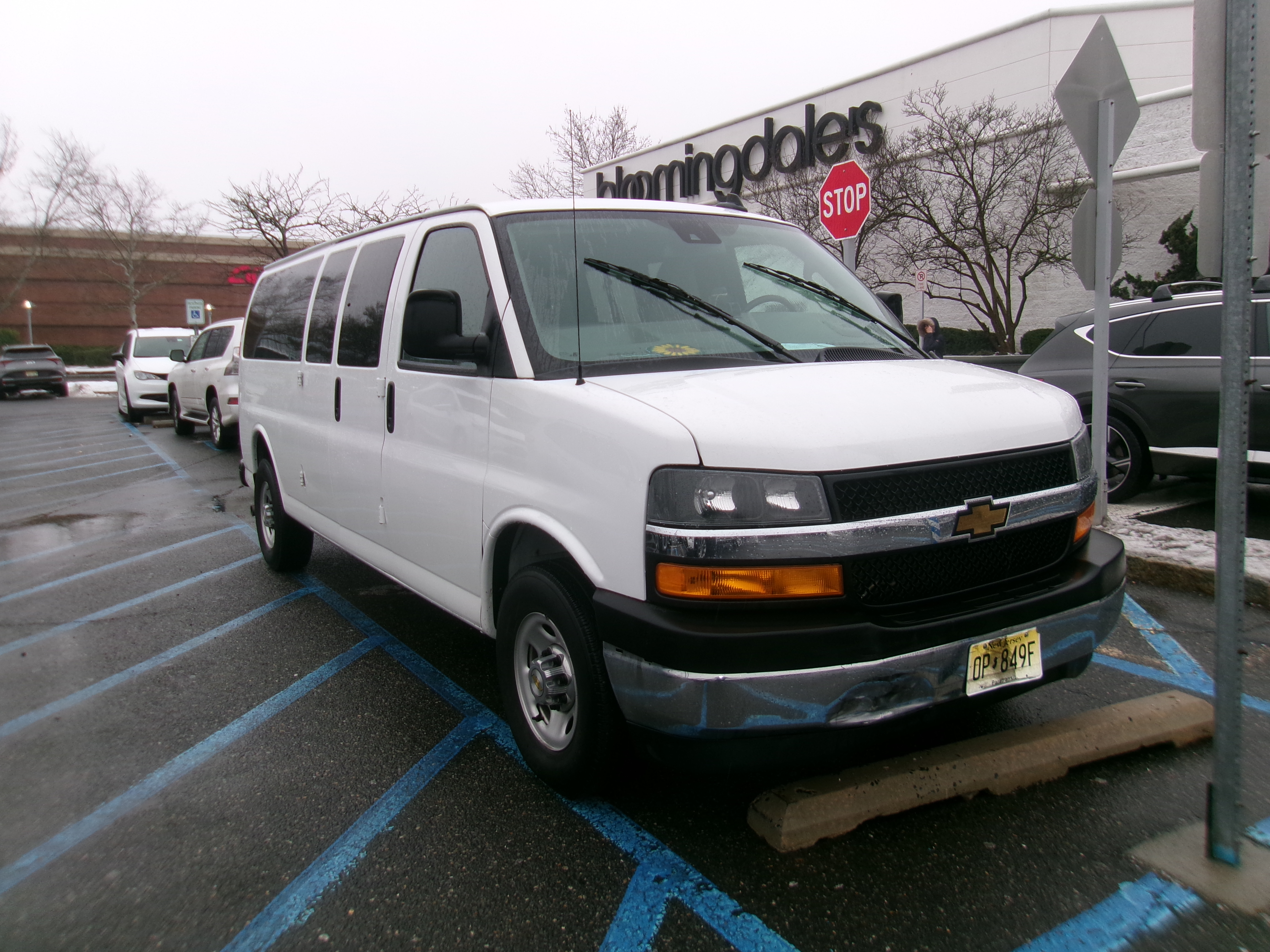
- 2024 Chevrolet Express LT 3500 (LWB)

Overview
- Manufacturer: General Motors; Navistar (cutaway chassis; 2017-present)
- Also called: GMC Savana
- Production: January 1996–present
- Model years: 1996–present
- Assembly: United States: Wentzville, Missouri (Wentzville Assembly); Springfield, Ohio (Navistar)

Body and chassis
- Class: Full-size van
- Body style: 2-door cutaway van 3-door van (sliding door); 3+1 door van (panel door); 4+2 door van (panel door)
- Related: Chevrolet C/K (GMT400); Chevrolet Silverado (GMT800); Chevrolet Kodiak/GMC TopKick (GMT560)

For 1996, General Motors released the fourth-generation Chevrolet van on the GMT600 platform (with GMC introducing the Savana). Derived loosely from the GMT400 light trucks, the Express (initially reserved for passenger vans; expanded to cargo vans for 1999) was an all-new design, moving to a separate frame; the front axle was moved 10 inches forward, moving the front wheels (and the engine) out of the passenger compartment. Far more aerodynamic than its predecessor, the Express adopted its styling from both the GMT400 trucks and the smaller Chevrolet Astro; the high-mounted taillamps were derived from the Lumina APV minivan (allowing the rear doors to be hinged nearly 180 degrees).

Following the success of the Astro/Safari, the Express was not developed in a short-wheelbase form, with GM only replacing the 125-inch and 146-inch wheelbase configurations. As a fourth generation of the G-series, the nomenclature was retained primarily as a VIN designator.

For 2003, the chassis underwent a revision, becoming the GMT610 platform, sharing engineering commonality with the GMT800 light trucks. Eclipsing the longevity of its predecessor in 2022, the Chevrolet Express is the longest-produced vehicle ever manufactured by General Motors in a single generation, entering its 30th model year for 2026.

== Concept vehicles ==
In 1966, General Motors developed the concept vehicle Electrovan, based on the GMC Handi-Van. The vehicle used a Union Carbide cryogenic fuel cell to power a 115-horsepower electric motor. It never went into production due to cost issues and safety concerns.

== In popular culture ==
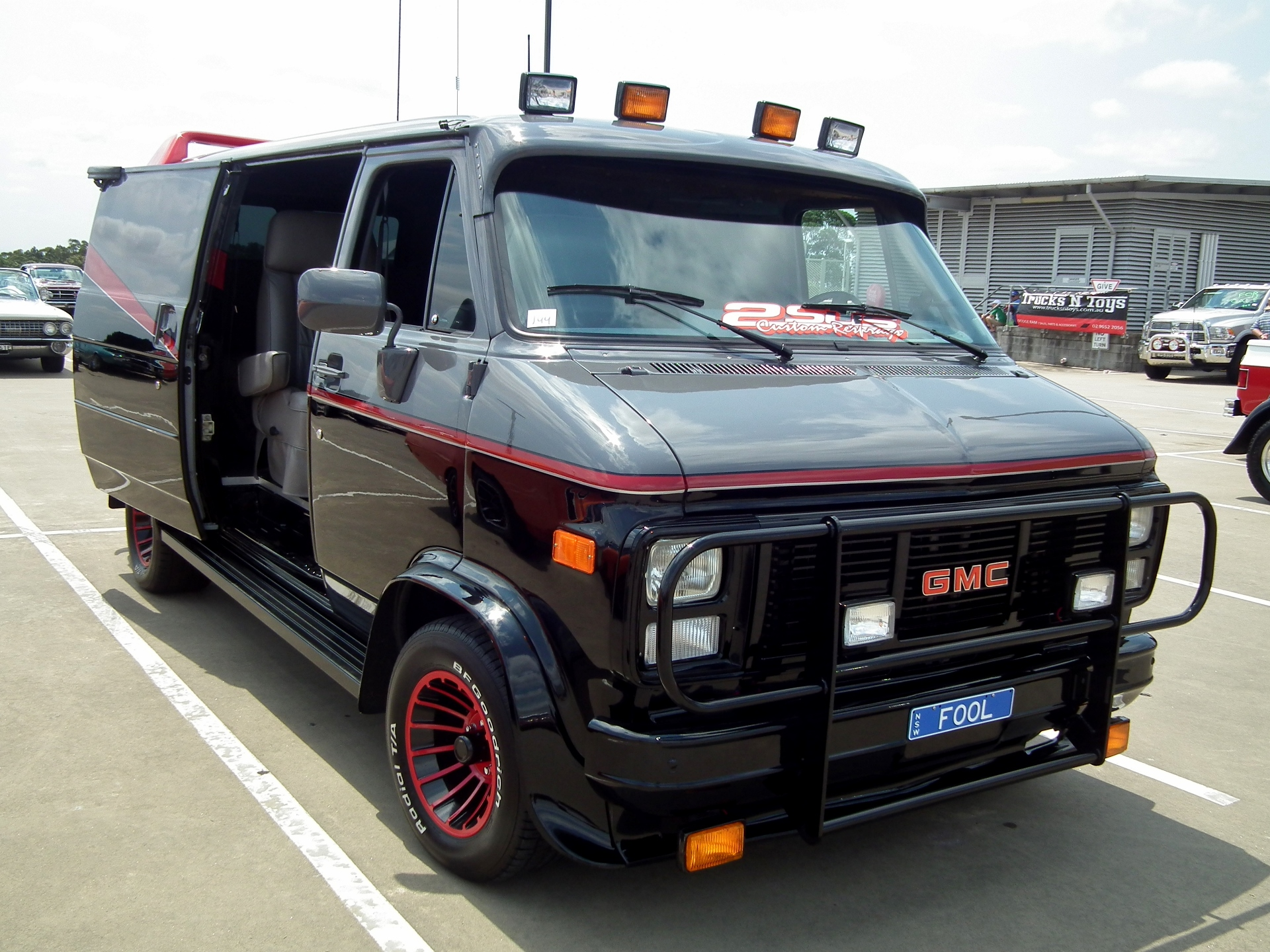
1983 GMC Vandura customized to match the appearance of the A-Team van

Product placement included a customized 1983 GMC Vandura in the 1980s television series The A-Team that was driven by B. A. Baracus (portrayed by Mr. T).

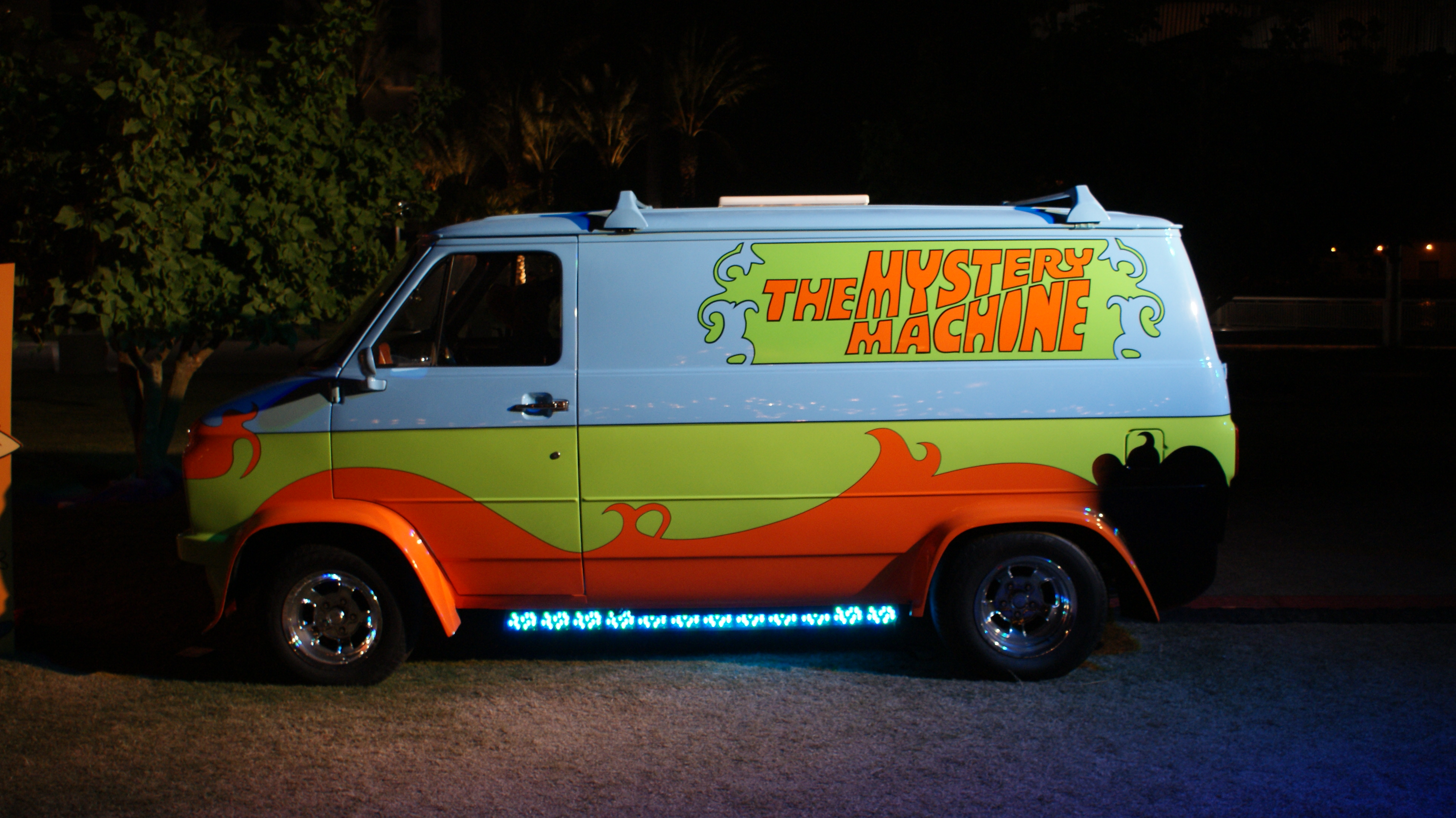
The Mystery Machine, a reproduction

Several Chevrolet G10 vans have been recreated into real-life Scooby-Doo Mystery Machines, including one from 1989 that is in the Warner Bros Corporate Archive.

"Chevy Van" is a 1975 song by Sammy Johns about a Chevrolet van.
