= Lone Star =

Lone Star, Lone Starr, Lone Stars or Lonestar may refer to:

== Communities in the United States ==
- Lone Star, Arizona, a populated place
- Lone Star, Fresno County, California, an unincorporated community
- Lone Star, Humboldt County, California, a former settlement
- Lone Star, Kansas, an unincorporated community
- Lone Star, Kentucky, an unincorporated community
- Lone Star, Missouri, an unincorporated community
- Lone Star, South Carolina, an unincorporated community
- Lone Star, Texas, a city
- Lone Star, Cherokee County, Texas, a ghost town
- Lone Star, Wise County, Texas, a ghost town
- Lone Star, Kaufman County, Texas, an unincorporated community
- Lone Star, Virginia, an unincorporated community

== Businesses ==
=== Media ===
- KZPS ("Lone Star 92.5"), a radio station serving the Dallas/Fort Worth market in Texas
- Lone Star Music, a New Braunfels, Texas-based music company
- Lone Star Productions, a Poverty Row producer of John Wayne western films in the 1930s, released through Monogram Pictures
- Lonestar Productions, an Australian film production company headed by Aaron Fa'aoso
- MovieTime (originally named Lonestar), a Canadian digital cable specialty channel
- The Lone Star (newspaper), a defunct newspaper in El Paso, Texas 1881–1886

=== Others ===
- Lone Star Brewing Company, the first large, mechanized brewery in Texas
- Lonestar Cell, a telecommunication company in Liberia
- Lone Star Comics, a former chain of comic book stores in the Dallas-Fort Worth area
- Lone Star Funds, a worldwide private equity firm based in London, UK
- Lone Star Steakhouse & Saloon, a casual dining restaurant chain
- Lone Star Toys, the name used by British company Die Cast Machine Tools Ltd for its toy products

== Transportation ==
- International LoneStar, a heavy duty truck manufactured by International Truck
- Lone Star (1920 automobile), an early American automobile manufactured by Lone Star Motor Truck and Tractor Corp. from 1920 to 1922
- Lone Star Airlines, an American regional airline that operated domestic and international flights from 1984 to 1998
- Lone Star (Amtrak train), an Amtrak passenger train serving Chicago, Kansas City, Oklahoma City, Fort Worth, and Houston from 1971 to 1974
- Lone Star (SSW train), a passenger train operated by St. Louis Southwestern Railway between Memphis and Dallas that discontinued service in 1952
- Lone Star (steamer), wrecked near Galveston, Texas in 1865
- Lone Star (towboat), a National Historic Landmark dry docked in Le Claire, Iowa

== Film and television ==
- Lone Star (1952 film), a Western starring Clark Gable, Ava Gardner and Broderick Crawford
- Lone Star (1996 film), an American mystery film written and directed by John Sayles
- Captain Lone Starr, a main protagonist in the 1987 Mel Brooks film Spaceballs
- Lone Star (TV series), a short-lived American television series
- 9-1-1: Lone Star, an American procedural drama TV series
- "Lone Star", a 1954 episode of Hallmark Hall of Fame
- "Lone Star", a comedy in one act, by James McLure

== Music ==
- Lone Star (band), a Welsh rock band formed in 1975
  - Lone Star (album), the debut album of the Welsh band
- Lone Star, a posthumous demos album by English rock band Shagrat
- Lonestar, an American country music band
  - Lonestar (album), the debut album of the American band

== Sports ==
- Austin Lone Stars, a soccer club that competed in the SISL, USISL and United Soccer Leagues from 1987 to 2000
- Liberia national football team (nicknamed the Lone Stars), national team of Liberia, controlled by the Liberia Football Association
- Lone Star Football League, a regional professional indoor football league from 2012 to 2014
- Lone Star League, the name of three American minor professional baseball leagues in Texas, all defunct
- Lone Star Conference, a college athletic conference
- Lone Star Park, a horse racing track in Grand Prairie, Texas
- Lone Star Series, an indoor football league that operated during 2021, later named the Arena Football Association
- Lone Star Showdown, the name of the collegiate, athletic rivalry between the Texas Longhorns and the Texas A&M Aggies across all varsity men’s and women’s sports
- Lone Star 500, a NASCAR race in 1972, renamed the Alamo 500

== Military ==
- 36th Infantry Division (United States) or Lone Star Division, now part of the Texas National Guard
- 49th Armored Division (United States), nicknamed the Lone Star, a United States Army National Guard unit
- Lone Star Army Ammunition Plant, a former government-owned facility near Texarkana, Texas

== People ==
- William Henry Dietz (1884–1964), nicknamed "Lone Star", American football player and coach
- John Pendleton (1802–1868), nicknamed "The Lone Star", American congressman, diplomat, lawyer and farmer

== Other uses ==
- Lone Star College System a public community college system serving the northern portions of the Greater Houston, Texas
- Lone Star Geyser, Yellowstone National Park, Wyoming
- Lone Star High School (Frisco, Texas), a public high school
- Lonestar (video game), a 2025 video game
- The Lone Star, a barque featured in the Sherlock Holmes story "The Five Orange Pips"
- Lone Star tick, a tick known scientifically as Amblyomma americanum
- Lonestar, a faction inside the video game Wardogs

== See also ==
- Intergalactic star, a star not gravitationally bound to any galaxy
- Lone star flag (disambiguation)
- Lone Star Series, the rivalry between the Houston Astros and Texas Rangers of Major League Baseball
- Texas, the Lone Star State
