= The Lone Star =

The Lone Star may refer to:

== People ==
- John Pendleton (1802–1868), nicknamed "The Lone Star", American congressman, diplomat, lawyer and farmer

== Media ==
- The Lone Star (newspaper), a defunct newspaper in El Paso, Texas 1881–1886

== Military ==
- 49th Armored Division (United States), nicknamed The Lone Star, a United States Army National Guard unit

== Other uses ==
- The Lone Star, a barque featured in the Sherlock Holmes story "The Five Orange Pips"

== See also ==
- Lone star flag (disambiguation)
- Texas, the Lone Star State
