= 9400 =

9400 may refer to:

- A.D. 9400, a year in the 10th millennium CE
- 9400 BCE, a year in the 10th millennium BC
- 9400, a number in the 9000 (number) range
- 9400 (1994 TW1), a near-Earth asteroid; the 9400th asteroid registered; see List of minor planets: 9001–10000
- International 9400, a semi-truck tractor unit model in the International 9000 series
- GWR 9400 Class, a class of pannier tank steam locomotive
- NS Class 9400, an electric multiple unit train set class
- UNIVAC 9400, a mainframe computer
