= List of shipwrecks in September 1865 =

The list of shipwrecks in September 1865 includes ships sunk, foundered, grounded, or otherwise lost during September 1865.

== 1 September ==
List of shipwrecks: 1 September 1865
Ship	State	Description
Elpis	Greece	The ship was wrecked in the Black Sea.
Flavio Gioza	United Kingdom	The ship departed from Quebec City, Province of Canada, British North America for Stockton-on-Tees, County Durham, United Kingdom. No further trace, presumed foundered with the loss of all hands.
Henry Buck	United States	The barque capsized at South Shields, County Durham. United Kingdom.
Mitara	Greece	The ship was wrecked in the Black Sea.
Pride	United Kingdom	The ship departed from Sombrero, Anguilla for a British port. No further trace, presumed foundered with the loss of all hands.
Roman Emperor	United Kingdom	The ship was driven ashore and wrecked near Gävle, Sweden. She was on a voyage from London to Söderhamn, Sweden.

== 2 September ==
List of shipwrecks: 2 September 1865
Ship	State	Description
Harriet White	(United Kingdom of Great Britain and Ireland) British North America	The schooner was run into by the steamship China (United Kingdom) and sank at Halifax, Nova Scotia. Her crew were rescued.
Hewson	United Kingdom	The brig ran aground on the Halhouden Rocks, on the Swedish coast. She was on a voyage from Fredrikshavn, Denmark to West Hartlepool, County Durham. She was subsequently taken in to Ekenäs, Grand Duchy of Finland.
Thetis	United Kingdom	The ship was lost near Lemvig, Norway or at Ystad, Sweden. Her crew were rescued. She was on a voyage from Hartlepool, County Durham to Gävle, Sweden.

== 3 September ==
List of shipwrecks: 3 September 1865
Ship	State	Description
Queen of England	United Kingdom	The barque foundered in the Atlantic Ocean (52°09′N 25°30′W). Her ten crew were rescued by the full-rigged ship Westmoreland (United States). Queen of England was on a voyage from Cardiff, Glamorgan to Saint John, New Brunswick, British North America.

== 4 September ==
List of shipwrecks: 4 September 1865
Ship	State	Description
Caledonia	United Kingdom	The steamship caught fire at New York, United States.

== 5 September ==
List of shipwrecks: 5 September 1865
Ship	State	Description
Adria	Austrian Empire	The full-rigged ship was driven ashore at Gibraltar. She was on a voyage from Trieste to Goole, Yorkshire, United Kingdom.
Architect	United Kingdom	The barque ran aground on "Little Hoften Island", in the Baltic Sea. She was on a voyage from London to Reval, Russia. She was refloated and resumed her voyage.
Brazilian Packet	United Kingdom	The ship was wrecked on Hogland, Russia.
Clintonia	United Kingdom	The ship was sighted off Constantinople, Ottoman Empire whilst on a voyage from Taganrog, Russia to a British port. No further trace, presumed foundered with the loss of all hands.

== 6 September ==
List of shipwrecks: 6 September 1865
Ship	State	Description
Amelie	France	The ship foundered at Guadeloupe. Her four crew were rescued.
Jane Pickard	United Kingdom	The ship departed from Shanghai, China for Yokohama, Japan. No further trace, presumed foundered with the loss of all hands.
Koh-i-Noor	United Kingdom	The ship was wrecked at "Domingo".

== 7 September ==
List of shipwrecks: 7 September 1865
Ship	State	Description
Alexandra	United Kingdom	The ferry steamer, from Newhaven, Sussex, England for Dieppe, Seine-Inférieure, France, was wrecked in fog on rocks at Cap d'Ailly, west of Dieppe; all passengers and crew were rescued. Although declared a total loss, she was subsequently refloated, repaired and returned to service.

== 8 September ==
List of shipwrecks: 8 September 1865
Ship	State	Description
De Hoop	Netherlands	The ship departed from Batavia, Netherlands East Indies for Shanghai, China. No further trace, presumed foundered with the loss of all hands.
Kate	United Kingdom	The schooner foundered in the Bristol Channel off Mortehoe, Devon. Her four crew survived. She was on a voyage from Newport, Monmouthshire to Plymouth, Devon.

== 9 September ==
List of shipwrecks: 9 September 1865
Ship	State	Description
Fanny Fern	(United Kingdom of Great Britain and Ireland) British North America	The full-rigged ship collided with the steamship Propontis (United Kingdom) at New York and was consequently beached.
George Albree	United States	The 181-ton sternwheel towboat was destroyed by a fire at Monongahela Wharf in Pittsburgh, Pennsylvania.
L'Envoi	France	The ship was wrecked on Starbuck Island. Her crew were rescued.

== 10 September ==
List of shipwrecks: 10 September 1865
Ship	State	Description
Albion	United Kingdom	The schooner was driven ashore west of Blakeney, Norfolk. . She was refloated and resumed her voyage.
Midas	(United Kingdom of Great Britain and Ireland) New Zealand	The 26-ton schooner was carried on to a reef at Flat Point on the Wairarapa coast during a heavy gale. All hands were rescued. She was on a voyage from Dunedin to Hokitaka.
Twilight	United States	The 230-ton sidewheel paddle steamer struck a snag and sank in the Missouri River at the mouth of Fire Creek, near Napoleon, Missouri.
River Queen	United States	The sternwheel paddle steamer was destroyed at the Monongahela Wharf in Pittsburgh, Pennsylvania, by a fire started by her engineer.

== 11 September ==
List of shipwrecks: 11 September 1865
Ship	State	Description
Belle of the Ocean	United Kingdom	The ship was wrecked at Bonny, Africa. Her crew were rescued.
Comet	United Kingdom	The brig sprang a leak and foundered in the North Sea. Her crew took to the longboat; they were rescued by Karen Marie (Denmark). Comet was on a voyage from Hamburg to Sunderland, County Durham.

== 12 September ==
List of shipwrecks: 12 September 1865
Ship	State	Description
Auchindown	United Kingdom	The sloop was driven ashore and wrecked on Ven, Sweden. She was on a voyage from Buckie, Moray to Stettin. She was refloated on 11 June 1866 and towed in to Helsingør, Denmark.
Hanna	Prussia	The ship was driven ashore and wrecked at Leba with the loss of two of her crew.
Reserve	United Kingdom	The barque caught fire and sank in the Mediterranean Sea 170 nautical miles (310 km) off Tripoli, Ottoman Tripolitania. Her crew survived. She was on a voyage from Alexandria, Egypt to Dover, Kent.
Unnamed	Flag unknown	The ship ran aground off Ameland, Friesland, Netherlands.

== 13 September ==
List of shipwrecks: 13 September 1865
Ship	State	Description
John	United Kingdom	The brig was run down and sunk by the steamship John Liddell (United Kingdom) at South Shields, County Durham with the loss of three of her four crew. The survivors was rescued by the tug Hope (United Kingdom). John was on a voyage from South Shields to Lowestoft, Suffolk.

== 14 September ==
List of shipwrecks: 14 September 1865
Ship	State	Description
Felix	United Kingdom	The ship ran aground on the Fahludd Reef, in the Baltic Sea. SHe was refloated and taken in to Slitohamn, Sweden for repairs.
Venus	United Kingdom	The schooner struck rocks in the Strangford Lough and sank. She was refloated on 16 September.

== 15 September ==
List of shipwrecks: 15 September 1865
Ship	State	Description
HMS Royalist	Royal Navy	The Rosario-class sloop was driven ashore in the West Indies. Subsequently refloated, repaired and returned to service.

== 16 September ==
List of shipwrecks: 16 September 1865
Ship	State	Description
Falcon, and Garland	United Kingdom	The steamships collided in Lough Foyle and were severely damaged. Two people on board Falcon were killed. She had to be beached. Garland was on a voyage from Londonderry to Morecambe, Lancashire. A number of people were killed. She put back to Londonderry.
Lone Star	United States	The steamship was wrecked in the Gulf of Mexico 6 miles (9.7 km) north of Red Fish Bar near Galveston, Texas.

== 17 September ==
List of shipwrecks: 17 September 1865
Ship	State	Description
Contest	United Kingdom	The tug collided with the Mersey Ferry Wild Rose and sank in the River Mersey at Liverpool, Lancashire. She was refloated on 19 September.
Jane and Helen	United Kingdom	The schooner was run into by the paddle steamer Wolf (United Kingdom and sank in the Clyde at Paisley, Renfrewshire. Her five crew survived.

== 18 September ==
List of shipwrecks: 18 September 1865
Ship	State	Description
Beaver	United Kingdom	The brig was driven ashore and sank at "Rayoe". She was on a voyage from Fredrikshavn, Denmark to Wisbech, Cambridgeshire. She was refloated.
Dispatch	United Kingdom	The barque was wrecked in the Yangtze. She was on a voyage from Shanghai to Fuzhou, China.
Maribelle	United Kingdom	The ship was wrecked on a shoal in the Montaran Islands, Netherlands East Indies. Her crew survived. She was on a voyage from Singapore, Straits Settlements to Batavia, Netherlands East Indies.

== 19 September ==
List of shipwrecks: 19 September 1865
Ship	State	Description
Eagle	United Kingdom	The steamship sank at Birkenhead, Cheshire.
Scotland	United Kingdom	The ship ran aground on The Platters. She was on a voyage from Newport, Monmouthshire to Liverpool, Lancashire. She was refloated and completed her voyage in a leaky condition.

== 20 September ==
List of shipwrecks: 20 September 1865
Ship	State	Description
Angelo	Italy	The ship was driven ashore near Alicante, Spain. She was on a voyage from Barletta to Falmouth, Cornwall or Queenstown, County Cork, United Kingdom. She was refloated and taken in to Alicante.
Brigand	(United Kingdom of Great Britain and Ireland) British North America	The schooner was wrecked on Lime Cay Reef, off the coast of Jamaica. She was on a voyage from Ragged Island, Newfoundland to Kingston, Jamaica.

== 21 September ==
List of shipwrecks: 21 September 1865
Ship	State	Description
Edmiston Brothers	United Kingdom	The brig ran aground and capsized at Newport, Monmouthshire.
Edward, and Souvenir	United Kingdom	The schooner Edward was damaged at Sunderland, County Durham when the barque Souvenir capsized onto her.
Rota	Denmark	The full-rigged ship sprang a leak and foundered in the English Channel 26 nautical miles (48 km) east north east of Cherbourg, Seine-Inférieure, France. Her crew were rescued by the schooner Charles (France) was on a voyage from Liverpool, Lancashire, United Kingdom to Riga, Russia.

== 22 September ==
List of shipwrecks: 22 September 1865
Ship	State	Description
Italia Una	Italy	The ship struck a rock and sank off Venetico. She was on a voyage from Zakynthos, Greece to "Calamota".
John	United Kingdom	The brig was driven ashore at Stornoway, Isle of Lewis, Outer Hebrides. She was on a voyage from South Shields, County Durham to Dublin. She was refloated the next day.
Nimrod	United States	The 30-ton sternwheel paddle steamer exploded on the Ohio River at Pittsburgh, Pennsylvania, killing five people.
North Pole	United Kingdom	The ship was wrecked at Husby Klit near Ringkøbing, Denmark, crew of 9 saved. She was on a voyage from London to Danzig.
USS Pink	United States Navy	The screw steamer was wrecked on Dauphin Island, Alabama during a gale.
Royal Saxon	United Kingdom	The tug ran aground on the Burbo Bank, in Liverpool Bay.

== 23 September ==
List of shipwrecks: 23 September 1865
Ship	State	Description
Charles Capper	United Kingdom	The steamship ran aground at Saint-Nazaire, Loire-Inférieure, France. She was on a voyage from Cardiff, Glamorgan to Saint-Nazaire. She was refloated.
Emerald Isle	(United Kingdom of Great Britain and Ireland) New Zealand	The 22-ton schooner was wrecked in Ocean Bay, Port Underwood during a heavy gale.

== 24 September ==
List of shipwrecks: 24 September 1865
Ship	State	Description
Fortunato	Flag Unknown	The ship ran aground at Harwich, Essex, United Kingdom. She was on a voyage from Taganrog, Russia to Ipswich, Suffolk, United Kingdom. She was refloated and resumed her voyage.

== 25 September ==
List of shipwrecks: 25 September 1865
Ship	State	Description
Anasia	United Kingdom	The ship was driven ashore at Portsmouth, Hampshire.
Betsey	United Kingdom	The ship collided with the steam hopper No. 4 (United Kingdom) and sank at South Shields, County Durham.

== 26 September ==
List of shipwrecks: 26 September 1865
Ship	State	Description
Active	United Kingdom	The ship was lost near Hammerfest, Norway. She was on a voyage from Arkhangelsk, Russia to London.
Commisaris der Koning	Netherlands	The barque was driven ashore in a typhoon at Manila, Spanish East Indies. She was consequently condemned.
Constant	United Kingdom	The ship was driven ashore in a typhoon at Manila.
Dardo	Spain	The brigantine was driven ashore in typhoon at Manila. She was consequently condemned.
De Hoop	Netherlands	The galiot foundered in the Bay of Biscay. Her crew were rescued by the brig Fanny (Russia). She was on a voyage from Dordrecht, South Holland to Nantes, Loire-Inférieure, France.
Durko	United Kingdom	The ship was driven ashore in a typhoon at Manila.
Immanuel	Brazil	The ship departed from Santos for the English Channel. No further trace, presumed foundered with the loss of all hands.
Leonar	Spain	The full-rigged ship was driven ashore in a typhoon at Manila.
London	United Kingdom	The steamship caught fire in the River Thames. She was on a voyage from Dundee, Forfarshire to London.
Marie Antoinette	France	The schooner foundered in the Mediterranean Sea (39°44′N 13°13′E). Her six crew were rescued by the brig List (United Kingdom).
Sabrina	United Kingdom	The barque was driven ashore in a typhoon at Manila.
Surbo	Flag unknown	The ship was driven ashore in a typhoon at Manila.
Tigris	United Kingdom	The ship was driven ashore in a typhoon at Manila.
Van der Huin	Netherlands	The barque was driven ashore in a typhoon at Manila.

== 27 September ==
List of shipwrecks: 27 September 1865
Ship	State	Description
Accrington	United Kingdom	The ship caught fire at London and was severely damaged. she was on a voyage from London to Calcutta, India.
Iddo Kimball	United States	The bark, sailing from New York City to the Savannah River was lost in the Oyster Beds near Fort Pulaski, Georgia, on or about this date.

== 28 September ==
List of shipwrecks: 28 September 1865
Ship	State	Description
Elizabeth	United Kingdom	The schooner foundered off Hartlepool, County Durham. Her crew survived. She was on a voyage from Middlesbrough, Yorkshire to Newcastle upon Tyne, Northumberland. She broke up on 3 October.

== 29 September ==
List of shipwrecks: 29 September 1865
Ship	State	Description
Conrade	United Kingdom	The schooner ran aground at Helsingør, Denmark. She was on a voyage from Vyborg, Grand Duchy of Finland to London. She was refloated and resumed her voyage.
John Bullock, and Samson	(United Kingdom of Great Britain and Ireland) New Zealand	The 76-ton paddle steamer Samson was towing the schooner John Bullock into the Hokitika River when the wash from another vessel caused her to veer into a sandspit. The John Bullock also grounded, but was able to be refloated.
Madras	India	The steamship ran aground 20 nautical miles (37 km) off Godavery Point. She was refloated the next day.
Paul	France	The brig collided with the full-rigged ship Mobile (Bremen) and was abandoned. She was subsequently towed in to the Isles of Scilly, United Kingdom by the steamship Behera (France).

== 30 September ==
List of shipwrecks: 30 September 1865
Ship	State	Description
Janetta	United Kingdom	The schooner ran aground at Calais, france. She was on a voyage from Middlesbrough, Yorkshire to Calais. She was refloated and taken in to Calais.
Jenny Ellingwood	United Kingdom	The ship was driven ashore at "Rosslan". She was on a voyage from Glasgow, Renfrewshire to New York, United States. She was refloated and taken in tow by the tug Ruby (United Kingdom)

== Unknown date ==
List of shipwrecks: Unknown date September 1865
Ship	State	Description
Agnes	Norway	The ship was wrecked near Thisted, Denmark. She was on a voyage from Bergen to Saint Petersburg, Russia.
Ark	United Kingdom	The ship was driven ashore at Dartmouth, Devon.
Augusta	(United Kingdom of Great Britain and Ireland) New Zealand	The 35-ton schooner was wrecked in Queen Charlotte Sound, New Zealand during a heavy gale between 9 and 11 September. All hands were rescued.
Blue Bell	United Kingdom	The ship was driven ashore at Cairnbulg, Aberdeenshire. She was on a voyage from Fraserburg, Aberdeenshire to Stettin.
Calmar	Sweden	The ship was driven ashore near Timmernabben.
Christina Thompson	(United Kingdom of Great Britain and Ireland) New Zealand	The 85-ton schooner was wrecked at Greymouth. She was beached after her rudder became unshipped.
Clementina	United Kingdom	The barque departed from Constantinople, Ottoman Empire for Falmouth, Cornwall. No further trace, presumed foundered with the loss of all eleven crew.
Dankbarheit	Flag unknown	The ship was wrecked on Hogland, Russia. She was on a voyage from Narva, Russia to Liverpool, Lancashire, United Kingdom.
Eliza and Emma	United Kingdom	The ship was wrecked at "Hamsach", Russia before 16 September. Her crew were rescued.
Eliza Beneke	United Kingdom	The barque was wrecked at Shanghai, China.
Emma	Stralsund	The ship was wrecked on Hiiumaa, Russia. She was on a voyage from Stralsund to Saint Petersburg, Russia.
Familien	Sweden	The ship was wrecked on "Cansholmen". She was on a voyage from Härnösand to London, United Kingdom.
Fire Queen	United Kingdom	The steamship ran aground on the Blacktail Sand, in the Thames Estuary.
Hannah Park	United Kingdom	The ship collided with the steamship Lena (Flag unknown) and sank in the Gulf of Finland. Her crew were rescued. She was on a voyage from Kronstadt, Russia to London.
Heather Bell	United Kingdom	The barque was abandoned in the Atlantic Ocean. Her crew were rescued by the barque River Bear (United Kingdom). Heather Bell was on a voyage from Swansea, Glamorgan to Coquimbo, Chile.
Helen Douglas	United Kingdom	The ship foundered in the China Sea with loss of life.
Heroine	United Kingdom	The ship foundered in the Baltic Sea before 8 September. Her crew were rescued.
Hope	United Kingdom	The brig ran aground in the Mississippi River. She was on a voyage from Havana, Cuba to New Orleans, Louisiana, United States. She was refloated on 6 February 1866.
Hulda	Russia	The ship was wrecked on "Cansholmen". She was on a voyage from Riga to Ghent, East Flanders, Belgium.
Idas	United Kingdom	The ship was wrecked 70 nautical miles (130 km) west of "Elephant Point". Her crew were rescued. She was on a voyage from Moulmein, Burma to Queenstown, County Cork.
Julia	(United Kingdom of Great Britain and Ireland) New Zealand	The 20-ton barge sailed from Wanganui for Pātea in early September and was not sighted again. It was supposed she foundered in the gales of 9–11 September. Some of her timbers were washed up on Rangitikei Beach, where they were discovered in October.
Lady Gray	United Kingdom	The full-rigged ship was severely damaged by fire at South Shields, County Durham before 22 September.
Margaret Evans	United States	The ship sank at New York. She was on a voyage from Livorno, Italy to New York.
Mount Alexander	(United Kingdom of Great Britain and Ireland) New Zealand	The schooner ran aground at Hokitika early in September, seriously damaging her hull.
Norskehove	Sweden	The ship was driven ashore on the Dutch coast. She was on a voyage from Sundsvall to Chatham, Kent, United Kingdom.
Onward	United Kingdom	The ship was wrecked on Sanda Island, Argyllshire. She was on a voyage from Ardrossan, Ayrshire to Mauritius.
Sarah	(United Kingdom of Great Britain and Ireland) New Zealand	The schooner left Wellington on 8 September and was not sighted again. Some wreckage was found in the Marlborough Sounds on 14 September. The rest of the ship's wreckage was found near the entrance to the Sounds in January of the following year, but the bodies of the two crew were never located.
Segetia	United Kingdom	The ship was driven ashore at "Stoniskov". She was on a voyage from Blyth, Northumberland to Kronstadt.
Shamrock	United Kingdom	The smack sank between Ballycotton and Poor Head, County Cork with the loss of a crew member. She was on a voyage from Youghal to Cork.
Swan	(United Kingdom of Great Britain and Ireland) New Zealand	The 36-ton cutter was wrecked at Greymouth at about the same time as the Christina Thompson.
Villa de Luarno	Spain	The brigantine ran aground on the Sunk Sand, in the North Sea off the coast of Essex, United Kingdom. She was refloated with the assistance of New Unity and Scout (both United Kingdom).
Wings of the Morning	United Kingdom	The ship was driven ashore in the Gulf of Smyrna. She was on a voyage from North Shields, Northumberland to Smyrna, Ottoman Empire. She was refloated and taken in to Smyrna, where she arrived on 22 September.
