= International 9000 (COE) =

International 9000 series (COE)
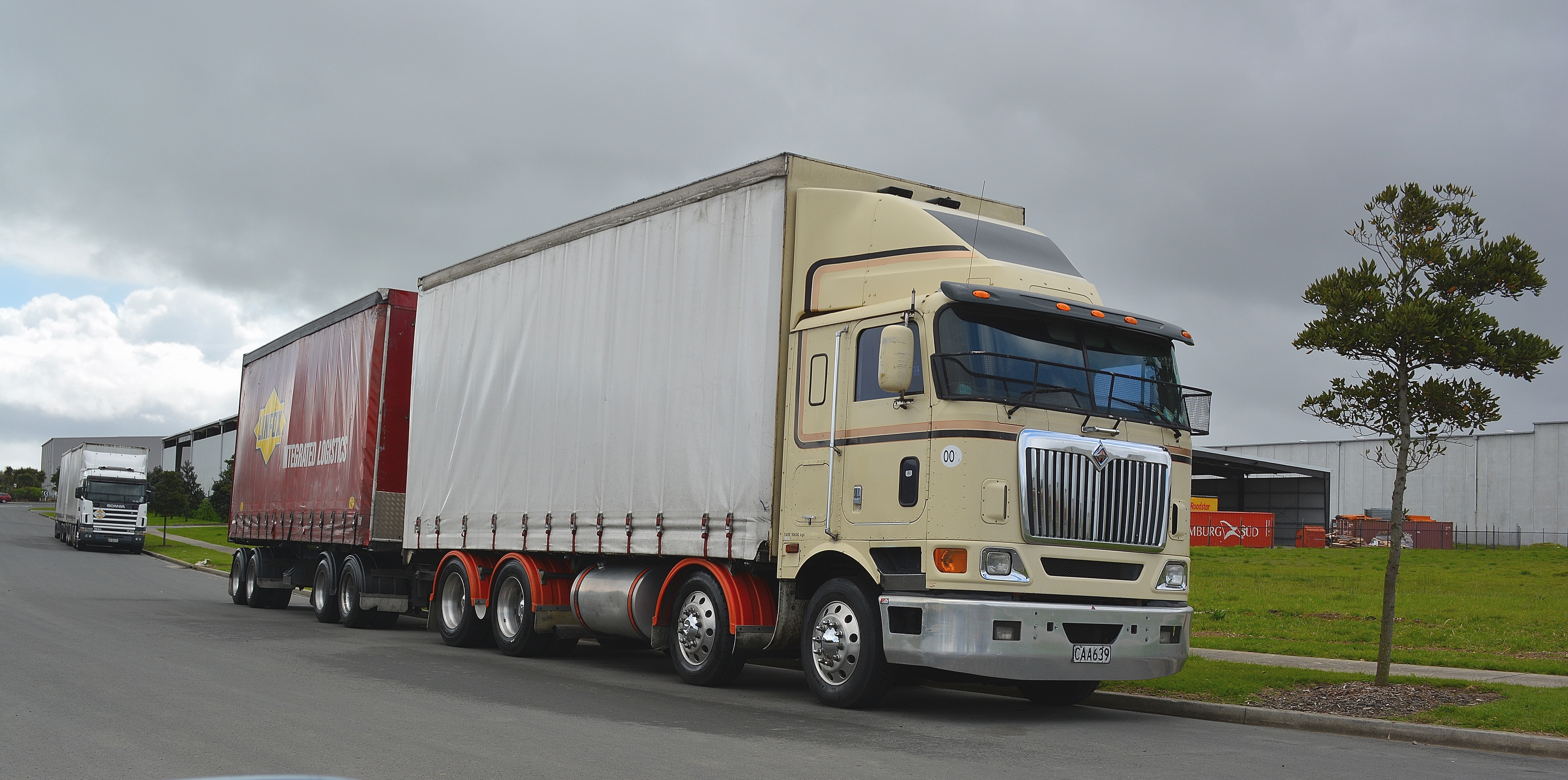
- 2004 International 9800i twin-steer (New Zealand)

Overview
- Type: Truck
- Manufacturer: International Harvester; Navistar International
- Also called: International CO9670; International CO9670XL; International 9700; International 9800; International 9800i International 9870
- Production: 1981-1998 (United States and Canada); 1998-2004 (Brazil); 2004-2024 (New Zealand)
- Model years: 1981-2025
- Assembly: Chatham, Ontario; Tauriko, New Zealand

Powertrain
- Engine: Cummins N-Series, Caterpillar 3408, Cummins ISX, Cummins KT450
- Transmission: Eaton Fuller Roadranger (9 & 10 Speeds) Eaton Fuller RTLO series manual transmissions, Spicer Manuals

Chronology
- Predecessor: International Harvester Transtar II CO-4070

The COE version of the International 9000 is a series of cabover trucks that were produced by International Harvester and its corporate successor Navistar. Introduced in 1981 as the replacement for the Transtar II COE, two generations of the model line were produced in North America until 1998. Subsequent production continued into the 21st century for worldwide markets, where more restrictive length laws continue to favor the use of this configuration.

In North America, International assembled the 9000 COE alongside the rest of its Class 8 truck lines in Chatham, Ontario, Canada.

== First generation (CO9600/CO9670; 1981-1998) ==
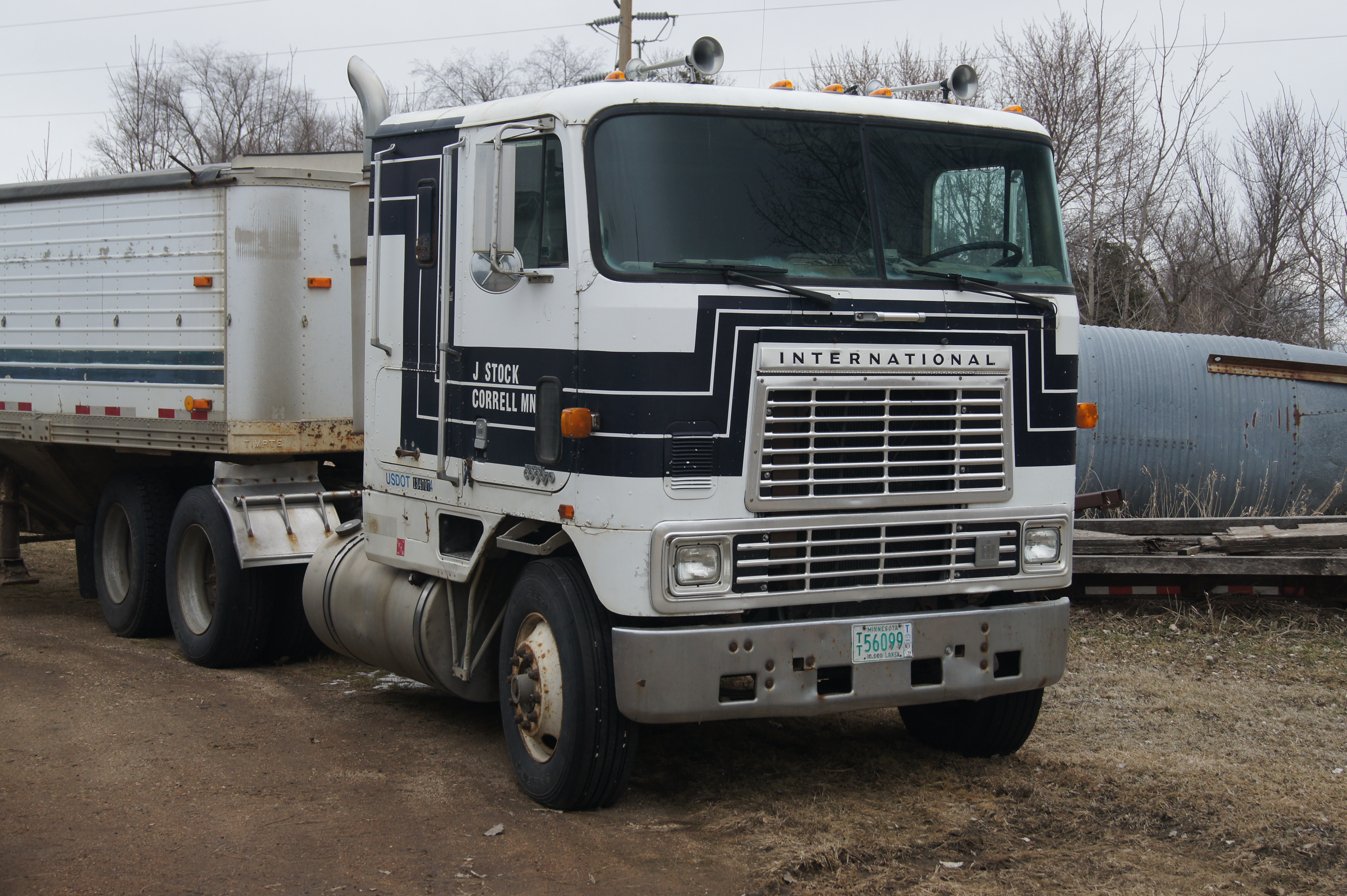
1984 International CO9670

For 1981, International Harvester introduced the CO9670 cabover to replace the Transtar II CO4070 in production since 1974. Sharing its doors with the Transtar 4300, the C09670 featured a wider cab, and larger windows and windshield. The trapezoidal grille used on all large International cabovers since 1965 was redesigned to include the headlights.

In place of the massive Cummins KT450 and Caterpillar 3408 engines included on the Transtar II, the CO9670 was powered by the smaller-displacement 855 cubic-inch N-Series Cummins diesel. In twin-turbocharged configuration, the engine produced 475 hp (354 kW).

In 1989, Navistar updated the CO9670, rebranding it the International 9600. Remaining in production alongside the newer 9700/9800, the set-forward axle 9600 was the only 9000 COE offered as a day-cab truck. Along with a revision in badging that replaced the "INTERNATIONAL" lettering at the top of the grille with a red International badge next to the left headlight, a 1990s facelift integrated the marker lights next to the headlamps.

== Second generation (9700/9800; 1988-1998) ==
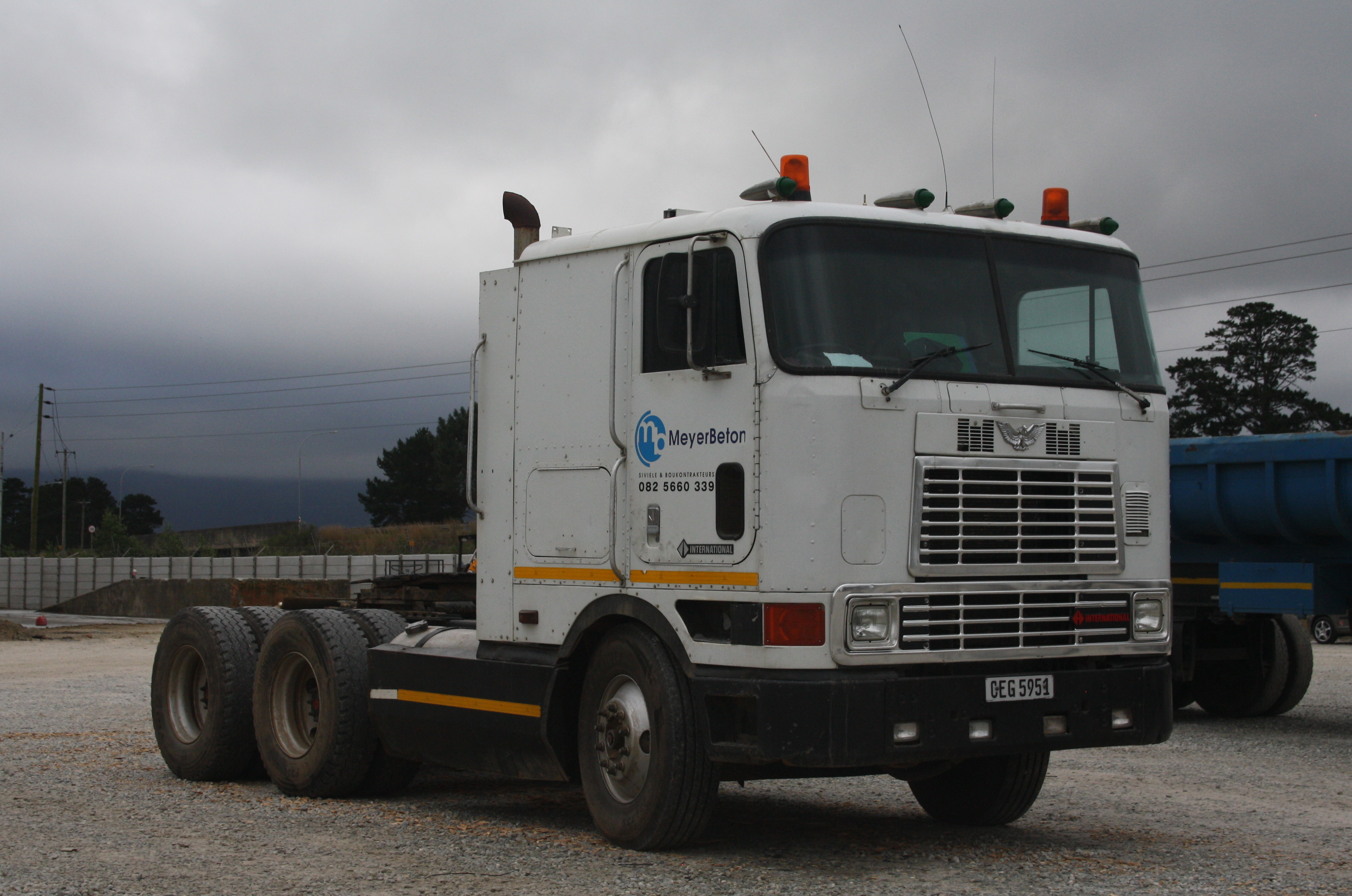
International 9800 Eagle (South Africa)

For 1988, Navistar introduced the 9700, its first Class 8 COE with a set-back front axle. With the exception of the reconfigured front axle, the 9700 was visually similar to the 9600 from above the frame, sharing a nearly identical cab (integrating the turn signals next to headlamps). The lower bodywork was given many aerodynamic enhancements, including optional lower body skirting and an enhanced front bumper.

The interior of the 9700 saw an extensive redesign, as the front-axle reconfiguration introduced a completely flat cab floor, with no engine intrusion separating the driver and passenger seats, allowing walk-in access to the sleeper compartment.

In 1996, the International 9800 was introduced as a flagship COE line, replacing the optional aerodynamic roof fairing with a high-rise roof (nearly 8 feet) above the front seats and sleeper compartment. As with the 9900 conventional, the 9800 was offered in customized Eagle trim.

For 1999, Navistar exited COE production in North America, ending sales of the 9000-series COE.

== Third generation (9800i; 1999-2015) ==
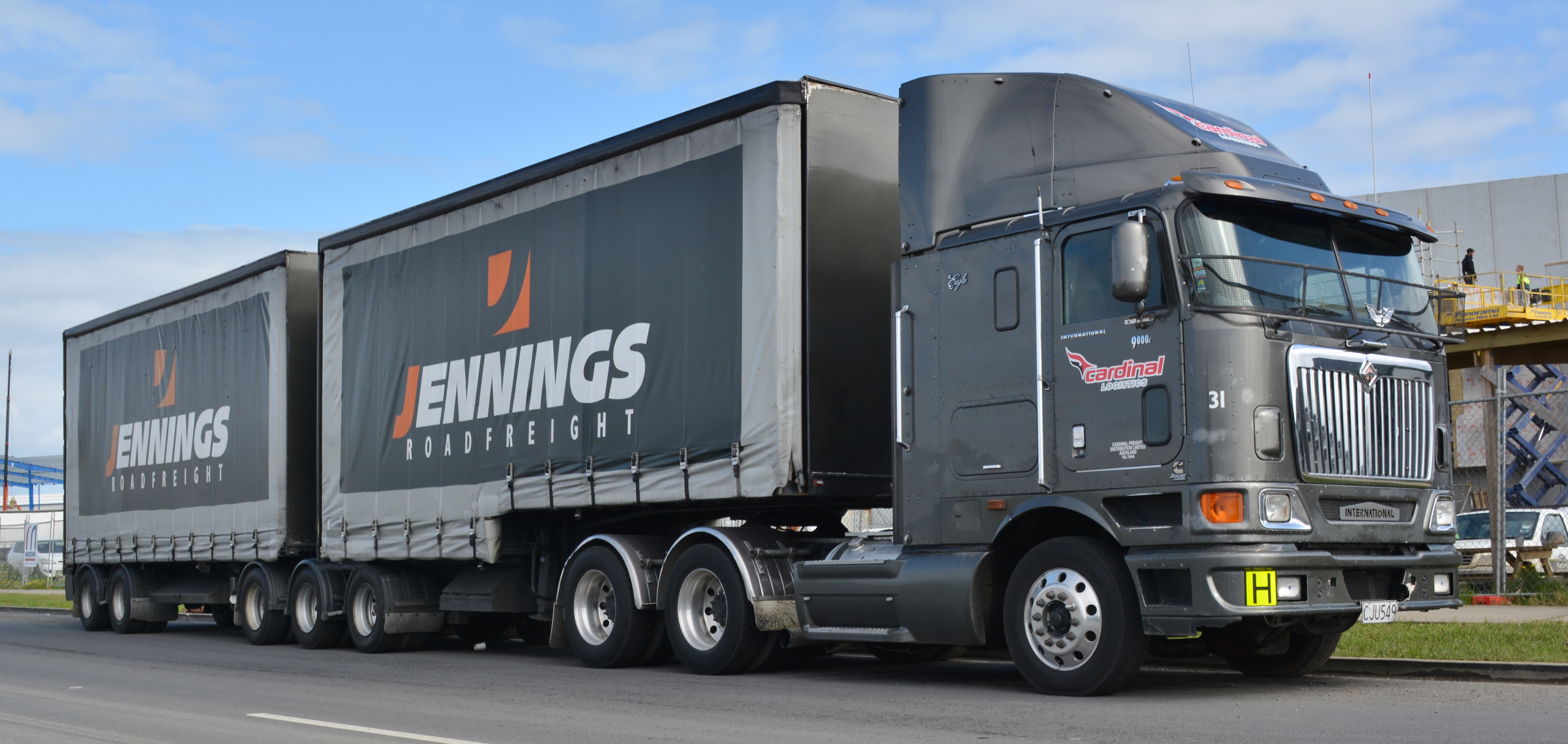
2004 International 9800i Eagle (New Zealand)

Following the discontinuation of the 9000-series COE in the North American market, Navistar continued cabover production by sending the tooling for the model line to Brazil. The 9800i was exported from Brazil throughout South America, with right-hand drive production exported to New Zealand and South Africa. Sharing much of the cab of the previous generation, the third generation shed the trapezoidal grille design of International COEs used since 1965 in favor of a square grille, in line with 9000i-series conventionals.

To meet local specifications and to provide better quality assembly, the assembly operation for the 9800i for the New Zealand market was shifted from South America to New Zealand in 2004.

== Fourth generation (9800; 2008-2014, New Zealand only) ==
In 2008, New Zealand assembler Intertruck completely redesigned the 9800, bringing the model in compliance with stricter Euro 4 emissions standards. Along with a raised cab, the air intake between the headlamps was replaced by a full-height grille (no longer derived from a conventional). The new Cummins engine increased its available output from 475hp to 615hp with 2050 lb/ft torque.

In 2012, the 9800 received an update for Euro 5 compliance, changing its diesel emissions-reduction system from EGR to SCR. The cab was restyled slightly, receiving four headlights for the first time. Intertruck assembled the 9800 through 2015, when it was replaced by the 9870.

== Fifth generation (9870; 2015-2024, New Zealand only) ==
In 2014, New Zealand revised its regulations governing truck dimensions, with COEs with a set-forward front axle gaining an advantage. The International 9870 was created, with a 920 mm (36 in) set-forward front axle replacing the previous 1,400 mm (55 in) set-back configuration. Alongside a standard 6x4 drive configuration, the 9870 was configured with twin-steer front axles and two or three rear drive axles. The cab itself saw few structural changes from the Euro 4/5 generations; a new cooling package brought a redesign of the grille (a flatter version of the International LoneStar).

In 2019, the twin-steer 9870 became the world's first truck line sold with air suspension for both front axles.

The 9870 was locally assembled in New Zealand by Navistar importer Intertruck, who sourced the cab from a stockpile of previous production. After plans to source a replacement cab fell through, the 185th and final 9870 was assembled by Intertruck at the end of 2024, shown alongside the first right-hand drive International HX assembled by the company.
