= International LoneStar =

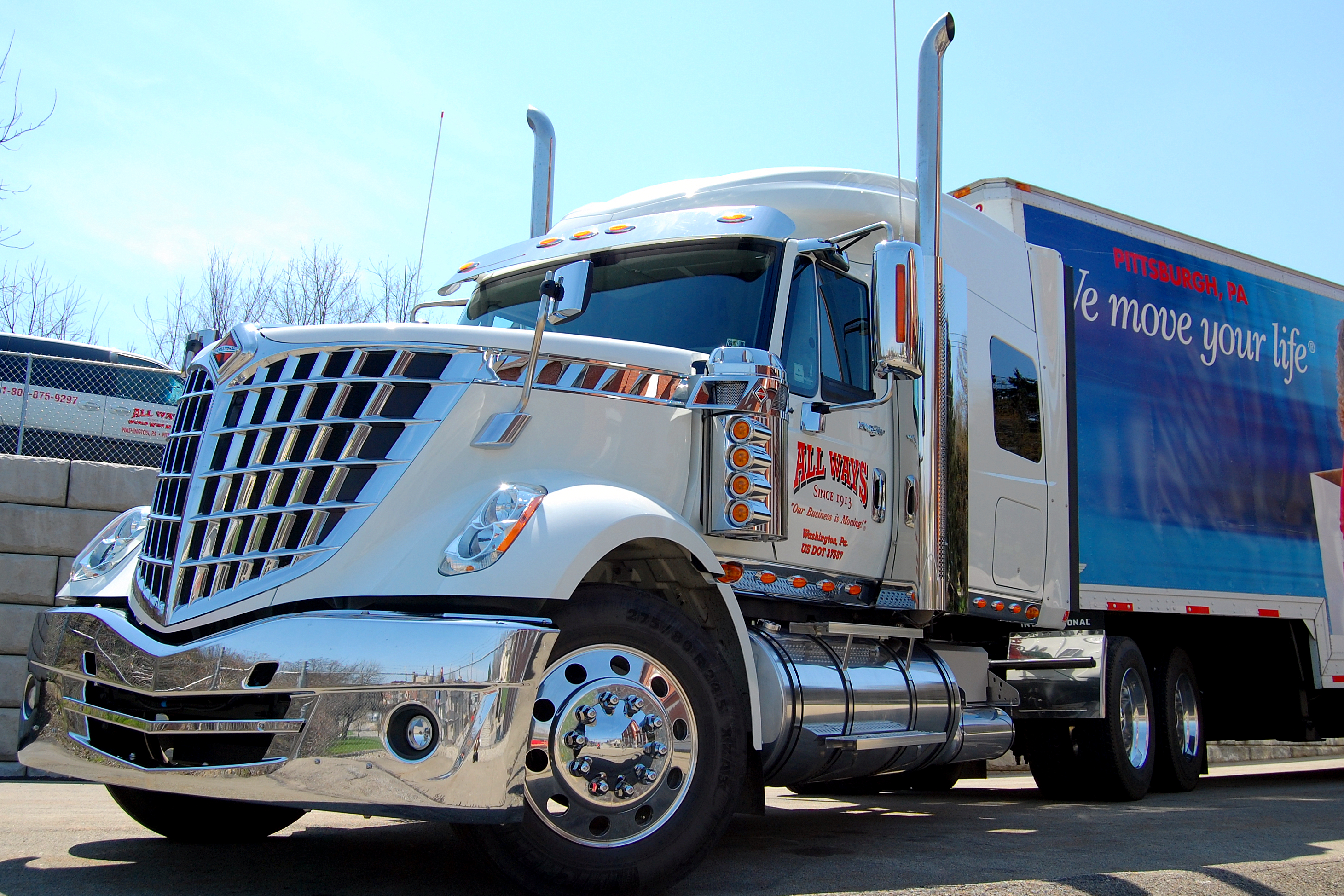

Overview
- Type: Truck (Class 8)
- Manufacturer: International Trucks
- Production: 2008–2023
- Model years: 2009–2024
- Assembly: Chatham, Ontario, Canada; Escobedo, Mexico; Springfield, Ohio, USA; Tauranga, New Zealand

Body and chassis
- Body style: Day cab Sleeper cab (56-inch); Sleeper cab (73-inch)
- Platform: International NGV
- Related: International ProStar

Powertrain
- Engine: Cummins ISX15 14.9 L turbodiesel I6; Cummins X15 14.9 L turbodiesel I6; Navistar MaxxForce 13 12.4 L turbodiesel I6
- Transmission: Manual (10-speed, 13-speed, 18-speed); Automated manual (10-speed, 13-speed, 16-speed, 18-speed)

Dimensions
- Wheelbase: 167–280 in (4,242–7,112 mm)

Chronology
- Predecessor: International 9900ix (indirect)
- Successor: International LT

The International LoneStar (also stylized as International Lonestar) is a model line of conventional-cab trucks that was produced by Navistar International from the 2009 to the 2024 model years. It was the company's largest on-highway truck and marketed as its flagship model, slotted above the International LT (formerly the International ProStar). Unveiled at the 2008 Chicago Auto Show, the Lonestar is the largest road vehicle ever introduced at the event. Despite its name, the truck has no relation to Texas, which is nicknamed the "Lone Star State" for the single star on its flag.

The Lonestar is a semitractor configured primarily for highway applications, and shares its cab with the LT/ProStar. Through special order, the model line was also offered for certain vocational applications, including heavy-duty towing or dump truck use.

At the time of its launch, all Lonestars were assembled by Navistar in Chatham, Ontario. Following the 2009 closure of that facility, Navistar shifted assembly of the Lonestar to its facilities in Springfield, Ohio and Escobedo, Mexico, where it was produced alongside the Prostar, Transtar, Durastar, and Workstar. In 2013, full right hand drive conversion LoneStars were being assembled in Tauranga, New Zealand. At the time, that was the only market where the LoneStar was sold outside of North America.

In December 2023, the 7,077th and final Lonestar was manufactured, and delivered to a Canadian carrier that had participated in the original development of the vehicle.

== Background ==
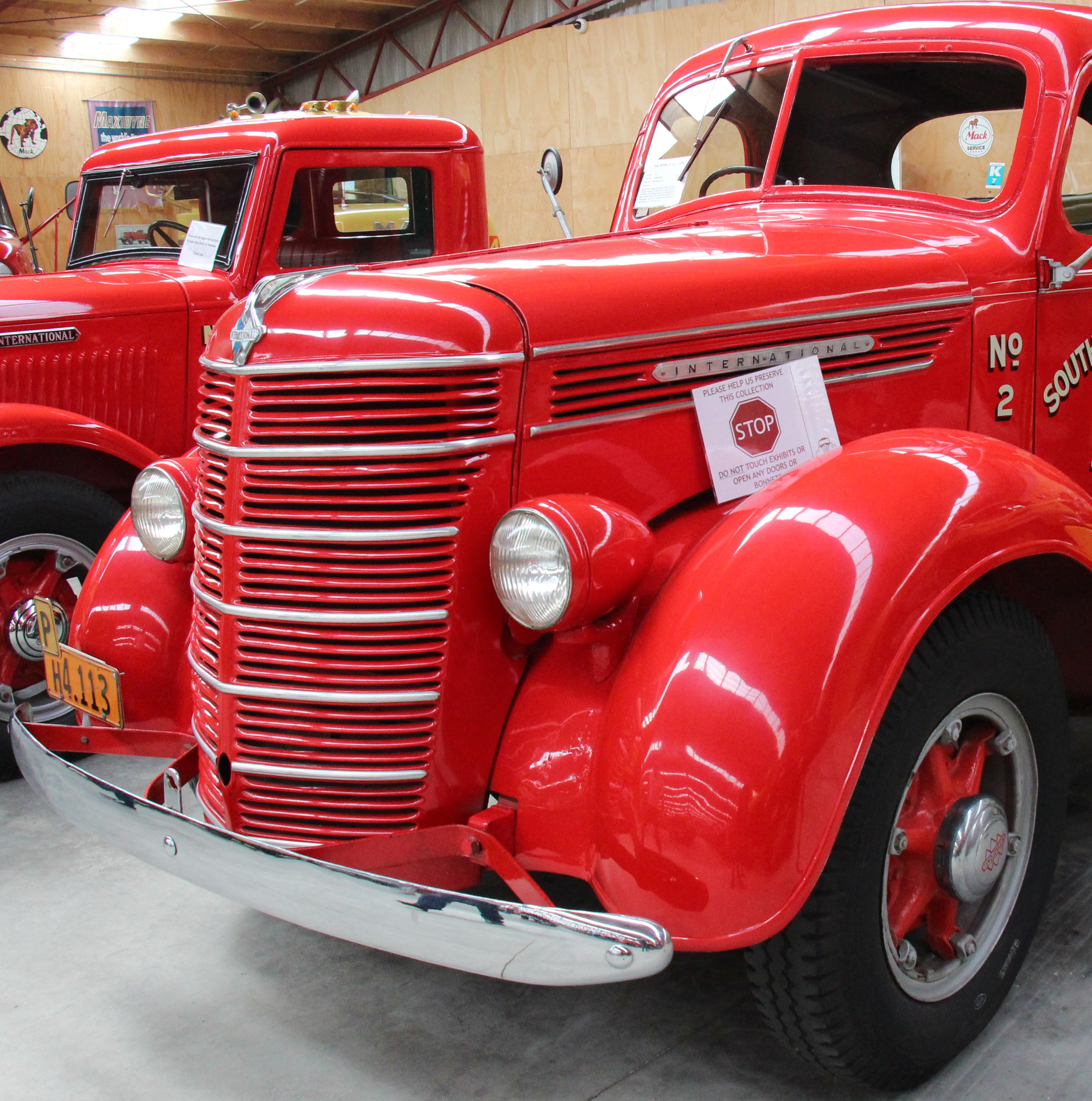
1938 International DS218T; the LoneStar adopted its swept-back grille design (which extended onto the sides of the hood)

According to Navistar, the Lonestar was developed to create an "Advanced Classic" truck, mating the design elements of vehicles from the past with 21st-century technology and aerodynamics; the company cited its primary design influence as the late-1930s International Harvester D-series As a large extended-hood conventional, the Lonestar also was similar to the classic-style International 9900ix and its competitors, featuring a large grille and bumper, external air filter containers, vertical-mount exhaust (with all of the above trimmed in chrome).

The final model of the NGV series to enter production, the Lonestar was developed in only 24 months from beginning to end; following its initial development on computers and clay models, the company shifted directly to production (bypassing the assembly of traditional prototypes). In line with the more contemporary design of the International Prostar, the exterior of the Lonestar was aerodynamically optimized. In comparison to the 9000-series and similar trucks, the Lonestar was projected to increase its fuel economy by up to 15%.

While priced as a premium vehicle, the Lonestar was developed as a vehicle for both owner-operators and large fleets, with Navistar citing that a large proportion of classic-style trucks owned by fleets are operated by larger fleets of over 25 vehicles.

== Design overview ==
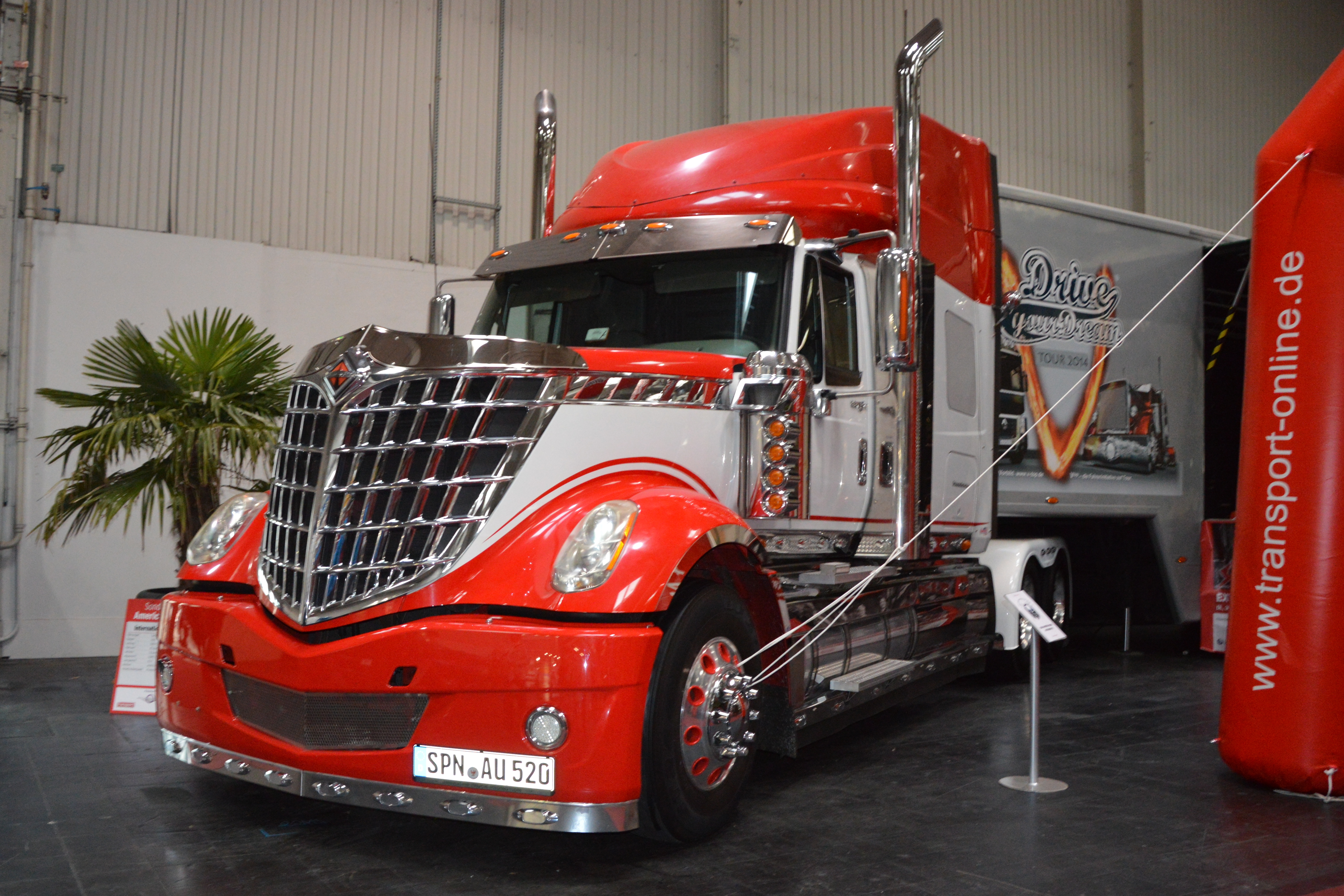
2010 Lonestar on display in Germany

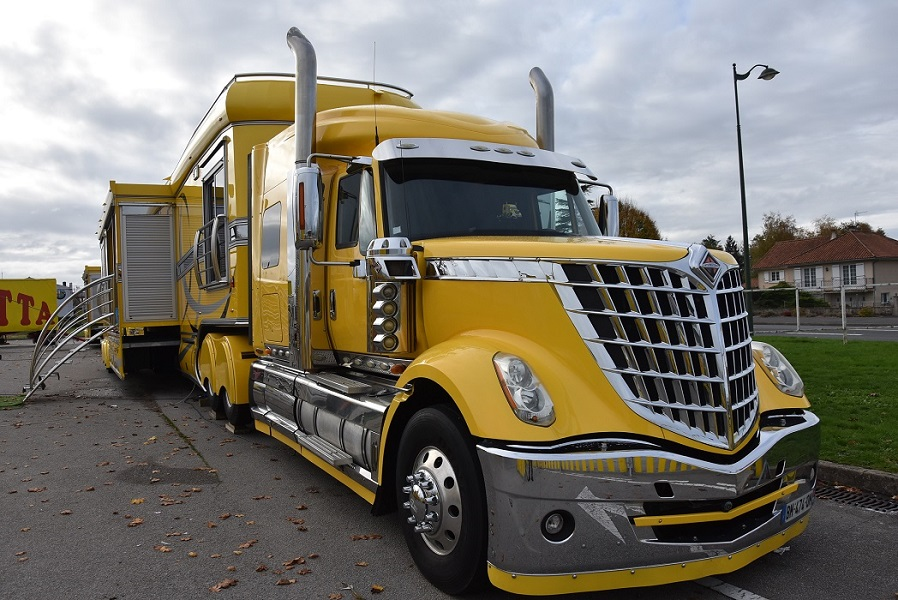
2011 yellow LoneStar in France, used as a circus truck.

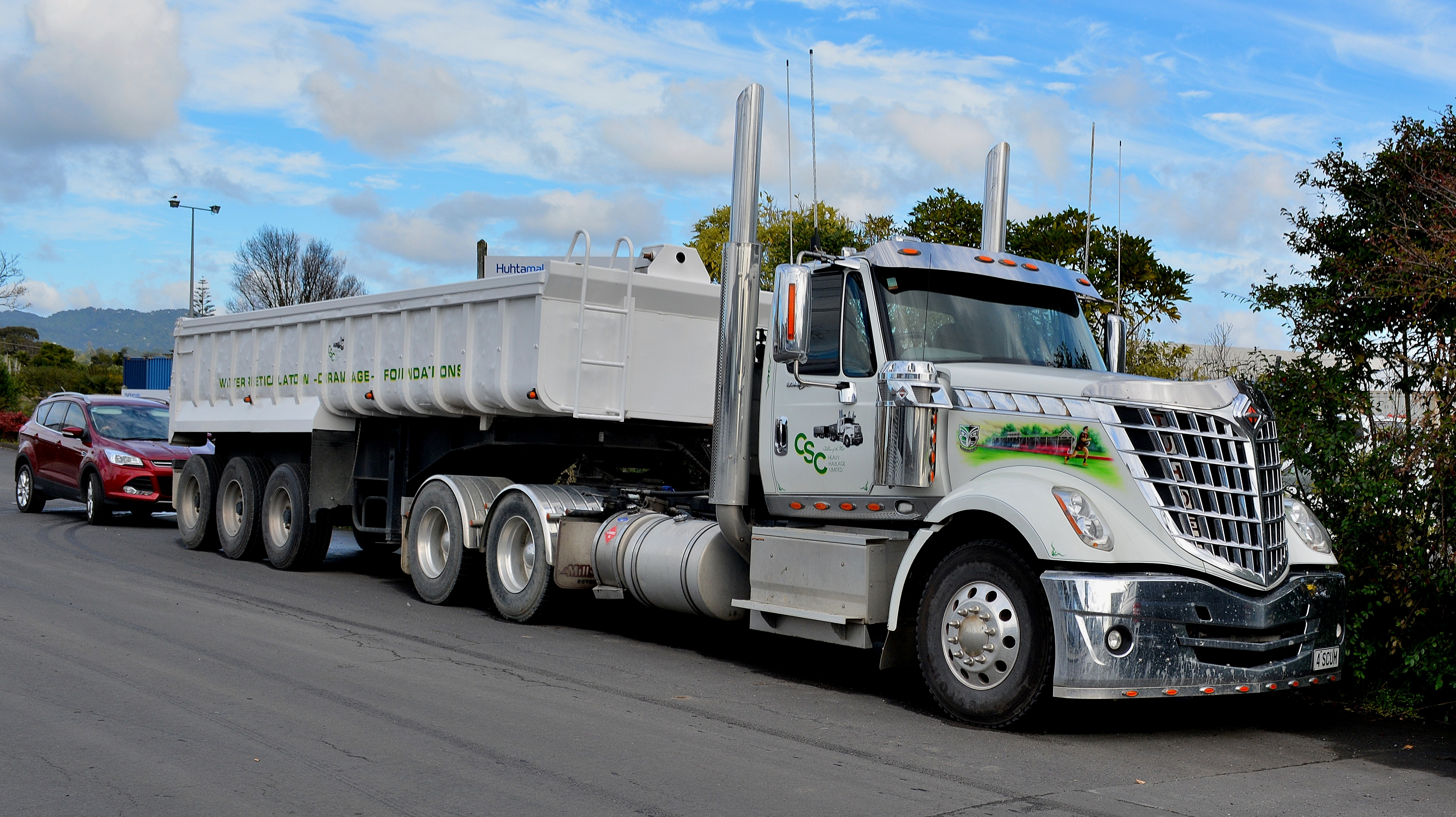
2015 Lonestar day-cab (New Zealand, converted to RHD)

Of the International NGV series of trucks, the Lonestar is most closely related to the Prostar; both developed for long-distance highway applications, the two vehicles share a common cab structure. The Lonestar is produced with a set-forward front axle and an extended hoodline; the Lonestar has a 132-inch BBC length (matching the Freightliner Coronado and 5 inches longer than the Peterbilt 379). The series was introduced in three configurations: a day cab, 56-inch sleeper (low and high-roof), and 73-inch sleeper cab (high-roof and extended-roof). All three configurations were shared with the Prostar (the regional-haul Transtar was offered with the day cab and 56-inch sleeper).

At its 2008 launch, the Lonestar was offered with two engines: the Navistar-produced "Maxxforce 13" 12.4 L inline-6 (410-500 hp) and the Cummins ISX15 14.9 L inline-6 (525-600 hp). Both engines were paired to Eaton-Fuller manual or automated manual transmissions.

While sharing its cab structure with lower-price International trucks, the interior of the Lonestar was distinguished by the use of premium-grade materials, components, and features. In place of a standard double-bunk configuration, the lower bunk of the wood-floored sleeper was replaced by a sofa bed; both front seats swivel backwards (when parked), converting the cab into a workspace.

To commemorate the launch of the model line, Navistar produced a Harley-Davidson Special Edition of the Lonestar; 250 trucks were produced for the 2009 model year. The special edition received its own grille and bumper design, headlights (sourced directly from Harley-Davidson motorcycles), and custom 24.5-inch wheels (with Harley-Davidson emblems on the center caps); each example was painted with a black and silver paint scheme with orange striping. The interior received "engine-turned" trim for the dashboard, black leather, and Harley-Davidson badging in the interior.

Following the discontinuation of the MaxxForce 13, the Cummins ISX15 became the sole engine for 2015 (itself becoming the X15 for 2016).

=== 2018 update ===
For 2017, Navistar underwent a redesign of its NGV model family (which dated to 2001), with the Prostar and Transtar becoming the International LT and RH, respectively. For 2018 production, the Lonestar followed suit; as part of the update, the model line became the final International truck series to keep its "-Star" model name.

While sharing its underlying cab structure, the second-generation NGV underwent a substantial redesign of the interior, improving visibility, ergonomics, and reliability. A reconfigurable digital display was added to the instrument panel and the shifter was redesigned for the automated manual transmission. The doors were redesigned, including remounted sideview mirrors (a change that would increase fuel economy by 0.5% itself). As the hood and grille underwent no essential changes, the update was distinguished by the adoption of single-piece side windows for the cab, a revision intended to increase peripheral visibility and reduce driver fatigue.

The Cummins X15 remains the sole engine, in outputs ranging from 400 to 605 hp; alongside automated manual transmissions, the revised Lonestar is also offered with manual transmissions.
