= International Transtar =

Truck range

International TranStar
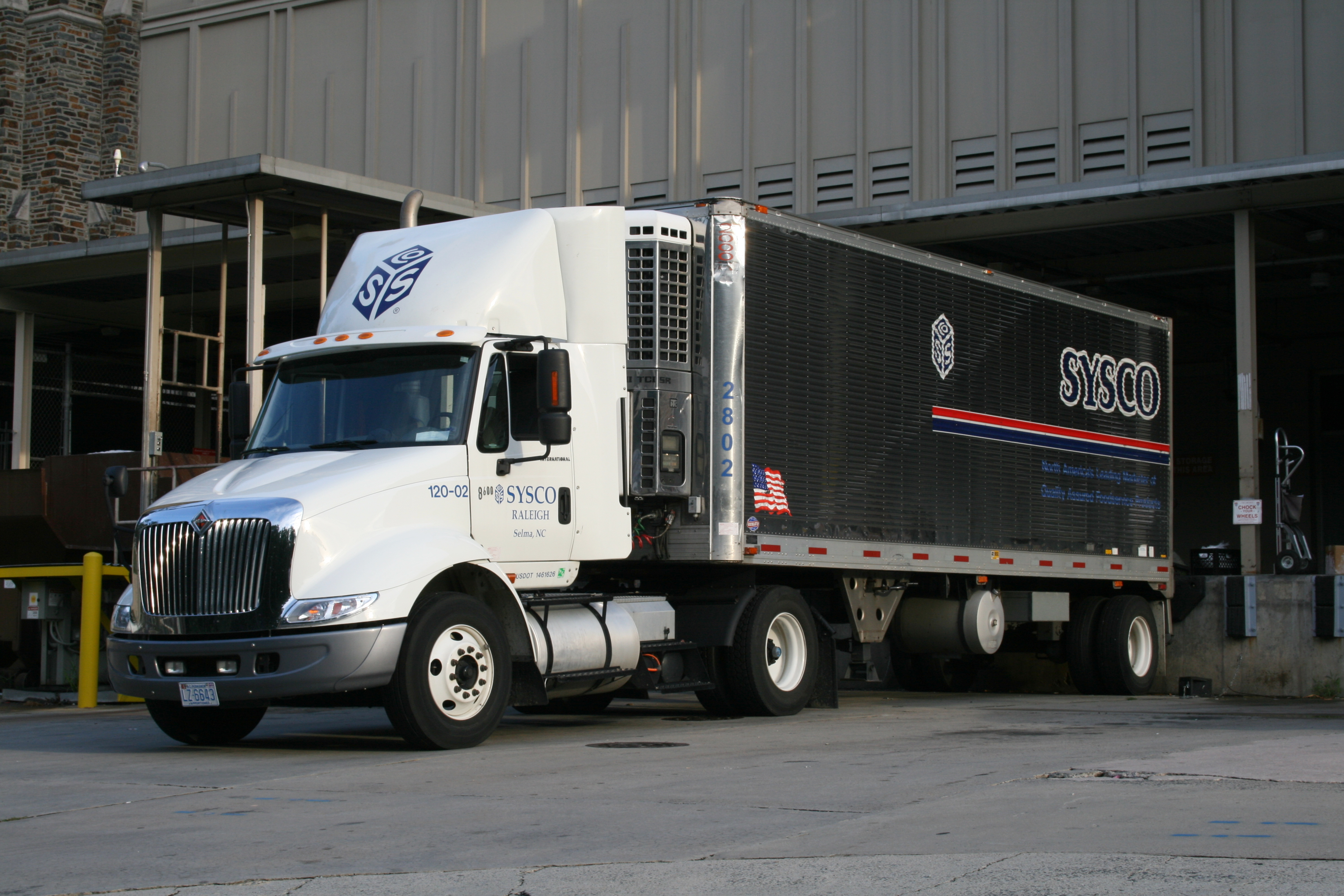

Overview
- Manufacturer: Navistar International
- Production: 2002-2017

Body and chassis
- Class: Class 6, 7 & 8, tractor unit

Powertrain
- Engine: International HT570 High Torque, Caterpillar and Cummins ISM
- Transmission: Eaton Fuller 10-speed manual Allison 5 & 6-speed automatic Spicer 7-speed manual

Chronology
- Successor: RH Series

The International TranStar (originally the International 8000 Series) is a range of Class 8 trucks produced by Navistar International for North America. Produced nearly exclusively as a semitractor, the product range is focused towards local delivery and regional shipping.

Introduced in 2002, the 8000 Series replaced a product line of the same name derived from the long-running International Harvester S-Series. In 2007, Navistar rebranded the 8000 Series as the International TranStar. The name is derived from International Harvester Transtar, used for various Class 8 conventional and cabover highway tractors from the 1960s to the 1980s.

== Historical models (International Harvester) ==
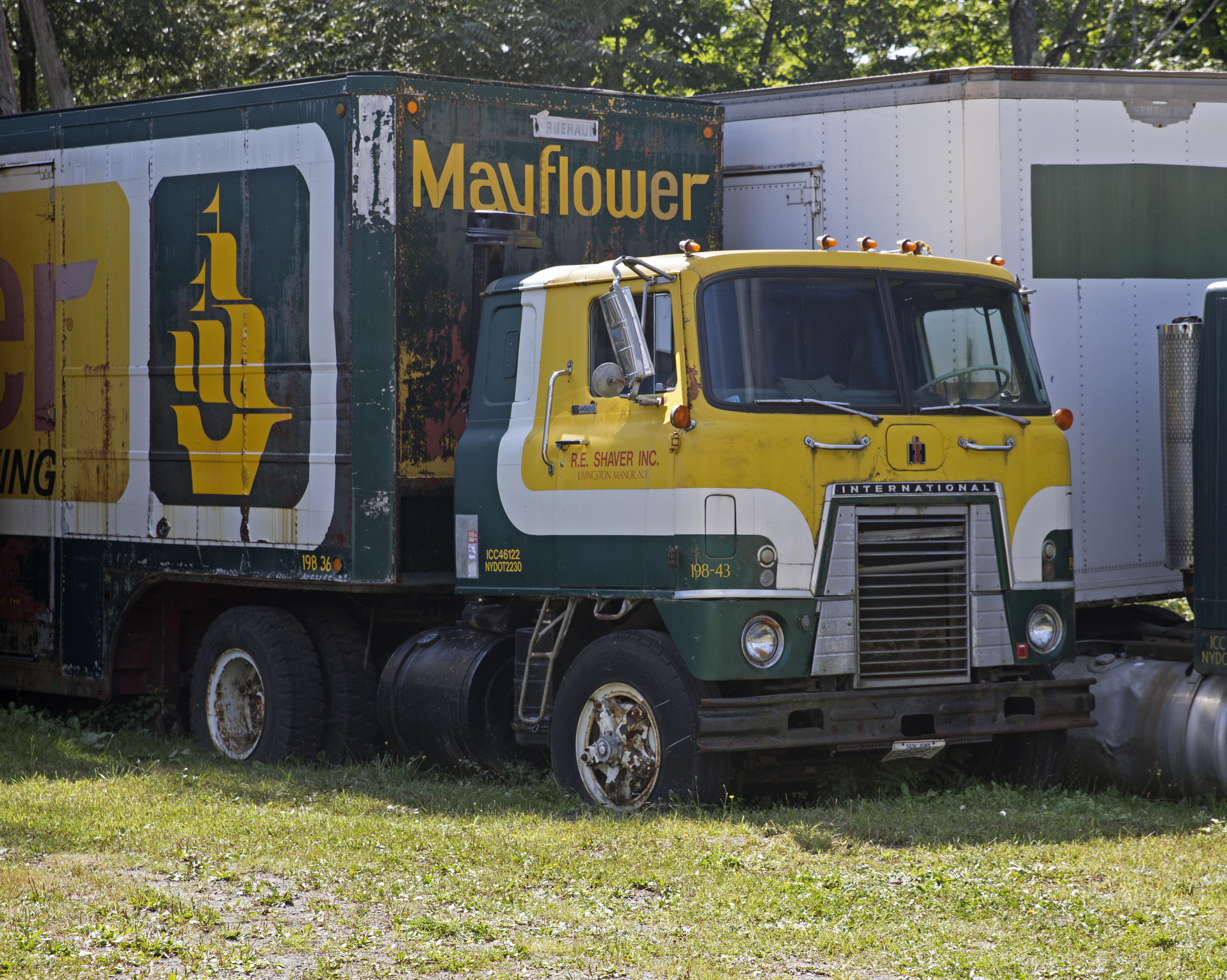
An International Harvester CO-4000

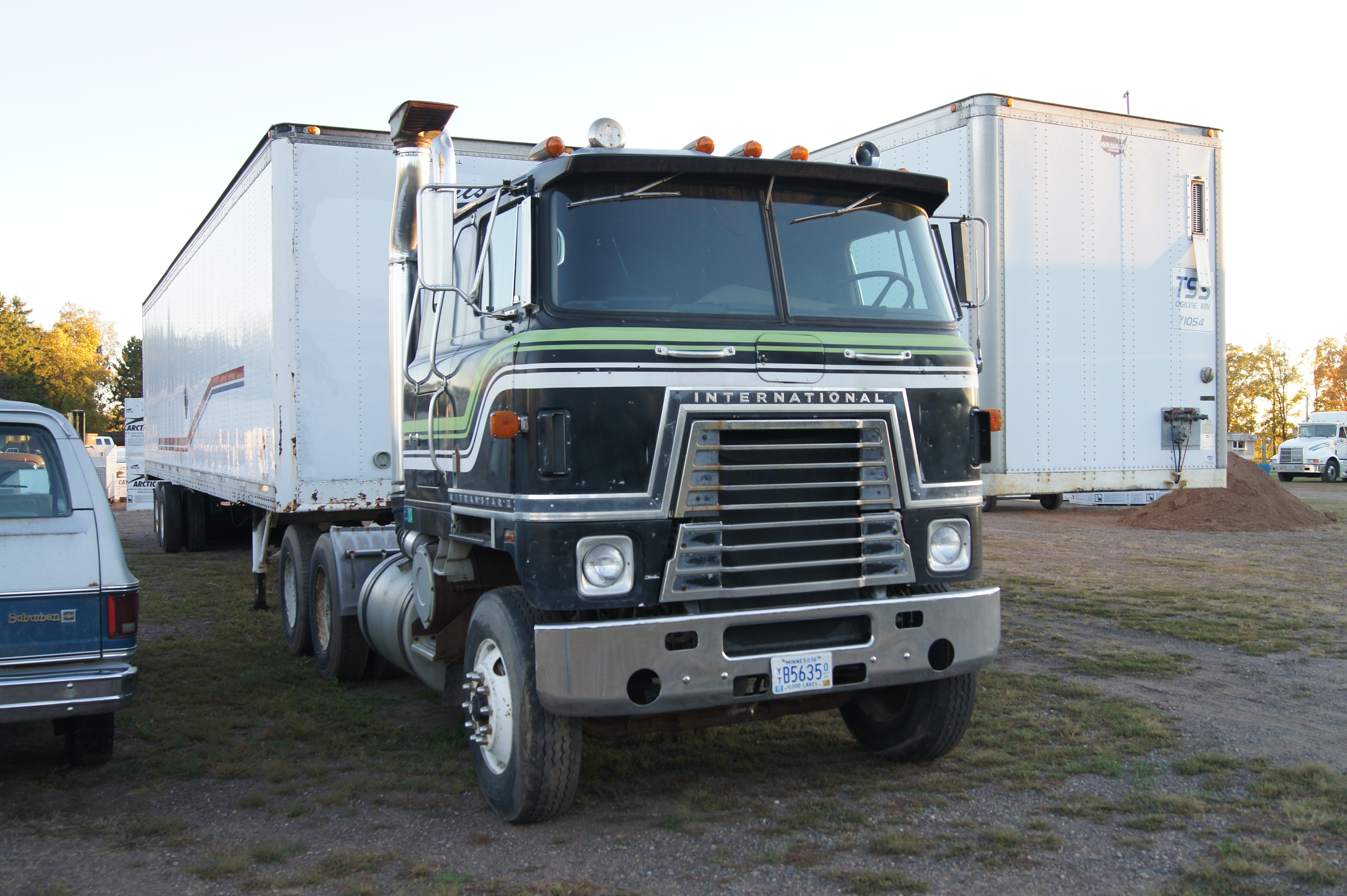
1974-81 Transtar II

=== Cabover ===
During the 1960s the DCOF-405 or "Emeryville" was the top seller among American trucks for four years.

In 1965, International Harvester introduced the CO-4000, replacing the DCO-400. Featuring a larger and wider cab, the CO-4000 was distinguished by a large trapezoidal grille, a design feature that would be used on International cabovers into the late 1990s. For 1968, the CO-4000 was given an update, with the standard engine becoming the turbocharged IHC DVT573 diesel V8 with optional diesel Cummins and Detroit Diesel engines. Internally known as the CO/COF-4070A and as COF-4090A (with a raised cab), the new truck was marketed as the Transtar.

For 1970, two new models were introduced. A Super Transtar featured a Detroit Diesel 12V71 V12 engine, allowing for loads of up to 144,000 lbs. The all-wheel drive Unistar was introduced; the truck was fitted with a freewheeling front axle, powered when the drive system detected loss of traction from the rear wheels; the Unistar was sold through 1972.

During 1974, the Transtar cabover underwent a second upgrade, becoming the Transtar II (CO/COF-4070B). Visually, few changes were made between the two vehicles, although a Transtar II is distinguished by windshield wipers mounted from the top of the cab. Under the cab, to accommodate trends towards larger-displacement engines, International modified the engine lineup. International offered its own V800 turbocharged diesel V8 (replacing the DVT573), with Detroit Diesel introducing the 8V92 V8 (in place of the 12V71), the Caterpillar 3406 six, and several Cummins engines, including the 1150cid KT-450 six (among the largest engines ever fitted to a roadgoing vehicle).

In 1981, the Transtar II CO 4070 was discontinued, replaced by the CO-9670, the first of the Newport Series cabovers. Sharing little more than the trapezoidal grille with the Transtar, the 9670 (also branded as the XL-Series) shared its doors with the Transtar 4300 conventional. In a significant break from precedent, the interior of the 9670 and its successors were designed without any intrusion of the engine or transmission (leaving a flat floor). The final Newport-series cabover sold in North America was assembled in 1998.

=== Conventional ===
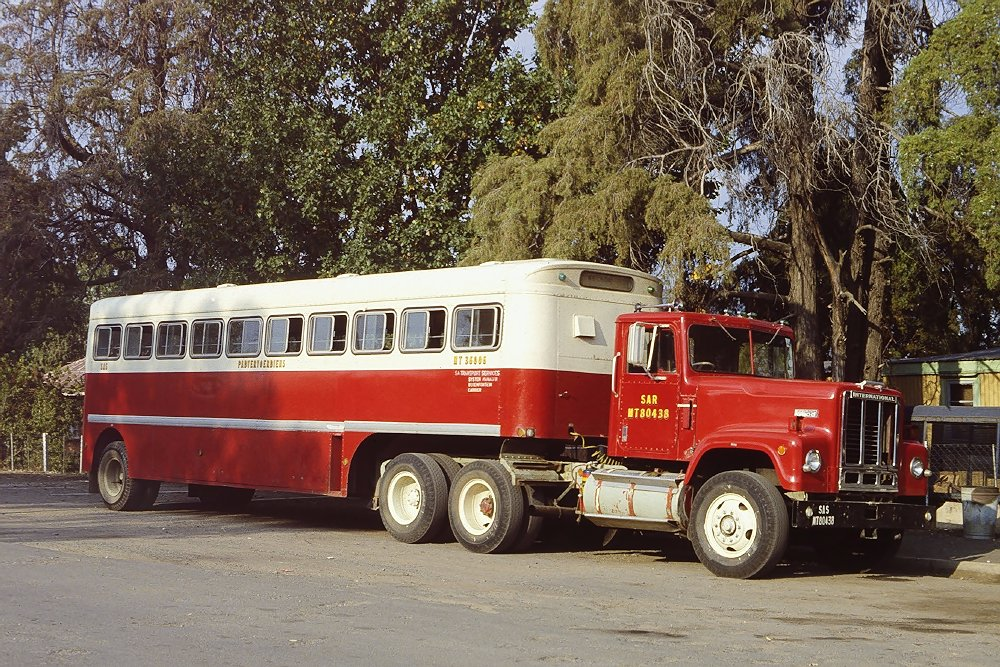
1970s Paystar 5000 towing a trailer bus

In 1969, International Harvester introduced the Transtar 400 conventional. An update of the D-400 introduced in 1961, the Transtar 400 was a long-hood conventional fitted with the cab of the DCO-400 ("Emeryville") cabover.

In 1971, International Harvester replaced the Transtar 400 with the Transtar 4270 (short-hood) and 4370 (long-hood) conventionals. A completely new design with a much larger cab, the Transtar cab would be shared with the all-new Paystar introduced in 1973.

In 1985, the Transtar 4370 saw a major update and a renaming. Dropping the Transtar name, it became the International 9370, an introductory model of the International 9000 series. In 2000, the cab saw a major redesign for the first time since its 1971 introduction.

== Design overview ==
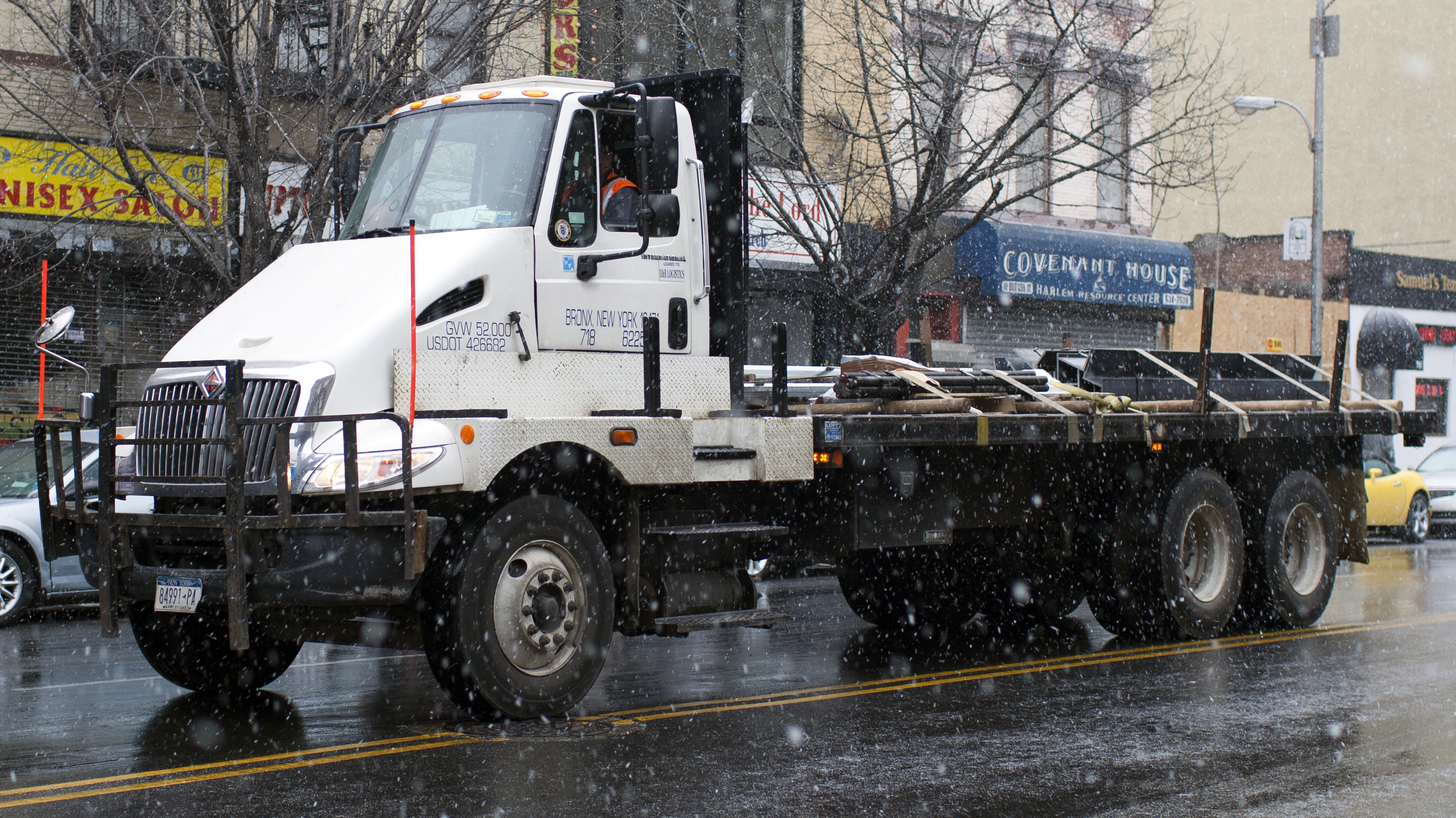
International TranStar 8600 with a special single-seat body for carrying long pipes

Although using a wide variety of chassis frames for each vehicle, the 8000/TranStar is produced with the same cab as the International DuraStar (with which it shares a larger version of its grille), the ProStar, WorkStar, LoneStar, and the discontinued TerraStar and XT truck lines. As it is designed as a regional vehicle, the exterior of the TranStar did not include the fuel-efficiency enhancements integrated into the long-haul ProStar.

=== Models ===
==== 8500 ====
The 8500 model has a wheelbase from 128 to 201 in (3.3 to 5.1 m), is powered by an International HT 570. Its front axle capacity is 10,000 lb (4,500 kg) or 12,000 lb (5,400 kg). Rear single axle has a capacity of 23,000 pounds (10,000 kg). Rear tandem axle has a capacity of 40,000 lb (18,000 kg). Both axles are either Meritor or Dana Spicer and are available with a driver-controlled locking differential. Applications include beverage, city tractor, and regional haul.

==== 8600 ====
The heavier-duty 8600 model has a wheelbase from 128 to 315 inches (3.25 to 8.00 m), is powered by either a Caterpillar or Cummins diesel. Its front axle is either a Meritor with a capacity of 10,000 lb (4,500 kg), 12,000 lb (5,400 kg), or 13,200 lb (6,000 kg) or a Dana Spicer with a capacity of 10,000 lb (4,500 kg), 12,000 lb (5,400 kg), 13,200 lb (6,000 kg), or 14,000 lb (6,400 kg). Rear single axle capacity is 23,000 lb (10,000 kg). Rear tandem axle capacity is 40,000 lb (18,000 kg). Both axles are either Meritor or Dana Spicer and are available with a driver-controlled locking differential. Applications include beverage, city tractor, liquid or dry bulk, and regional haul.

== Engines and transmissions ==
=== 8500 ===
  - International HT 570 High Torque (295 hp (220 kW)/950 lb⋅ft (1,290 N⋅m) to 310 hp (230 kW)/1,050 lb⋅ft (1,420 N⋅m))
  - Fuller - 10 speed manual, Spicer - 7 speed manual, Allison - 5 Speed / 6 speed automatic

=== 8600 ===
  - Caterpillar
  - Cummins ISM 320 hp (240 kW)/1,150 lb⋅ft (1,560 N⋅m) to 425 hp (317 kW)/1,550 lb⋅ft (2,100 N⋅m)

Note: References for this section are the same as for Variants

== International RH (2017-Present) ==
Introduced for 2017 production, the International RH serves as the replacement for the TranStar.
