= International ProStar =

International ProStar/LT
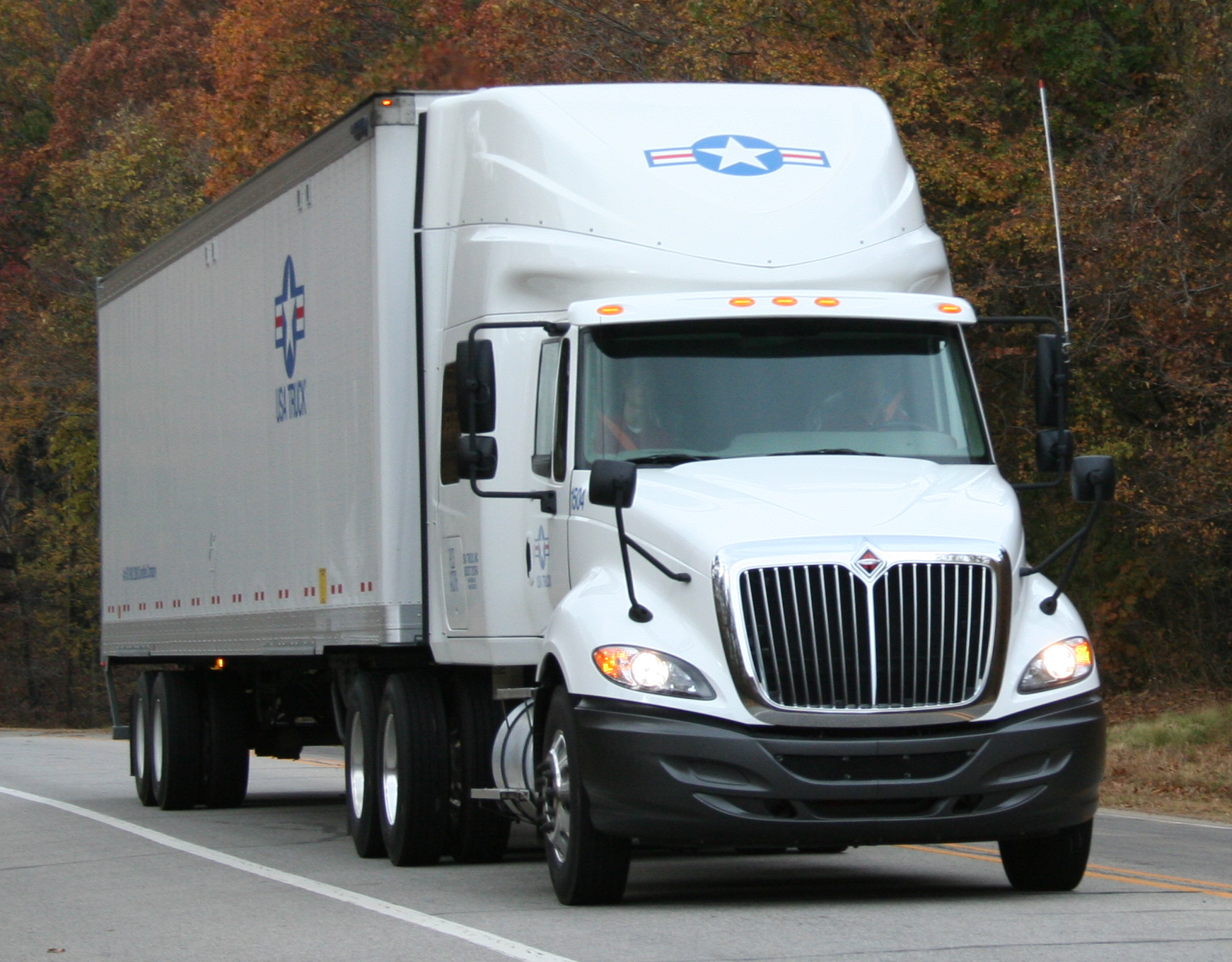
- 2006-2007 International ProStar sleeper cab

Overview
- Manufacturer: International Trucks
- Also called: JAC Gallop V5/V7 (China, International LT)
- Production: 2006-2016 (ProStar) 2017-present (LT Series only)
- Assembly: Chatham, Ontario; Springfield, Ohio; General Escobedo, Mexico; Tauranga, New Zealand

Body and chassis
- Class: Class 8

Powertrain
- Engine: International MaxxForce 11; International MaxxForce 13; Cummins ISX15
- Transmission: Eaton Fuller; Eaton Ultrashift Automated Manual

Chronology
- Predecessor: International 9400i
- Successor: LT Series

The International ProStar is a line of Class 8 trucks that was manufactured by Navistar International from 2006 to 2016, marking the introduction of the "-Star" branding nomenclature to International Trucks. As part of a substantial model revision, International reintroduced the ProStar as the International LT for 2017 (LT=Line-haul Tractor) which is still manufactured to the present. The conventional-cab ProStar replaced the 9400i (and shorter 9200i). Competing against the Freightliner Cascadia and the Kenworth T2000/Peterbilt 387, the ProStar was an aerodynamically-enhanced conventional.

Offered in both day-cab and sleeper-cab configurations, the ProStar was configured primarily for long-distance highway use.

Initially assembled in Chatham, Ontario until 2009, the ProStar was assembled in Springfield, Ohio and Escobedo, Mexico until its discontinuation. For the New Zealand market, a right hand drive version of the ProStar was assembled in Tauranga, New Zealand with 6x4, 8x4 and 10x4 configurations.

== Overview ==
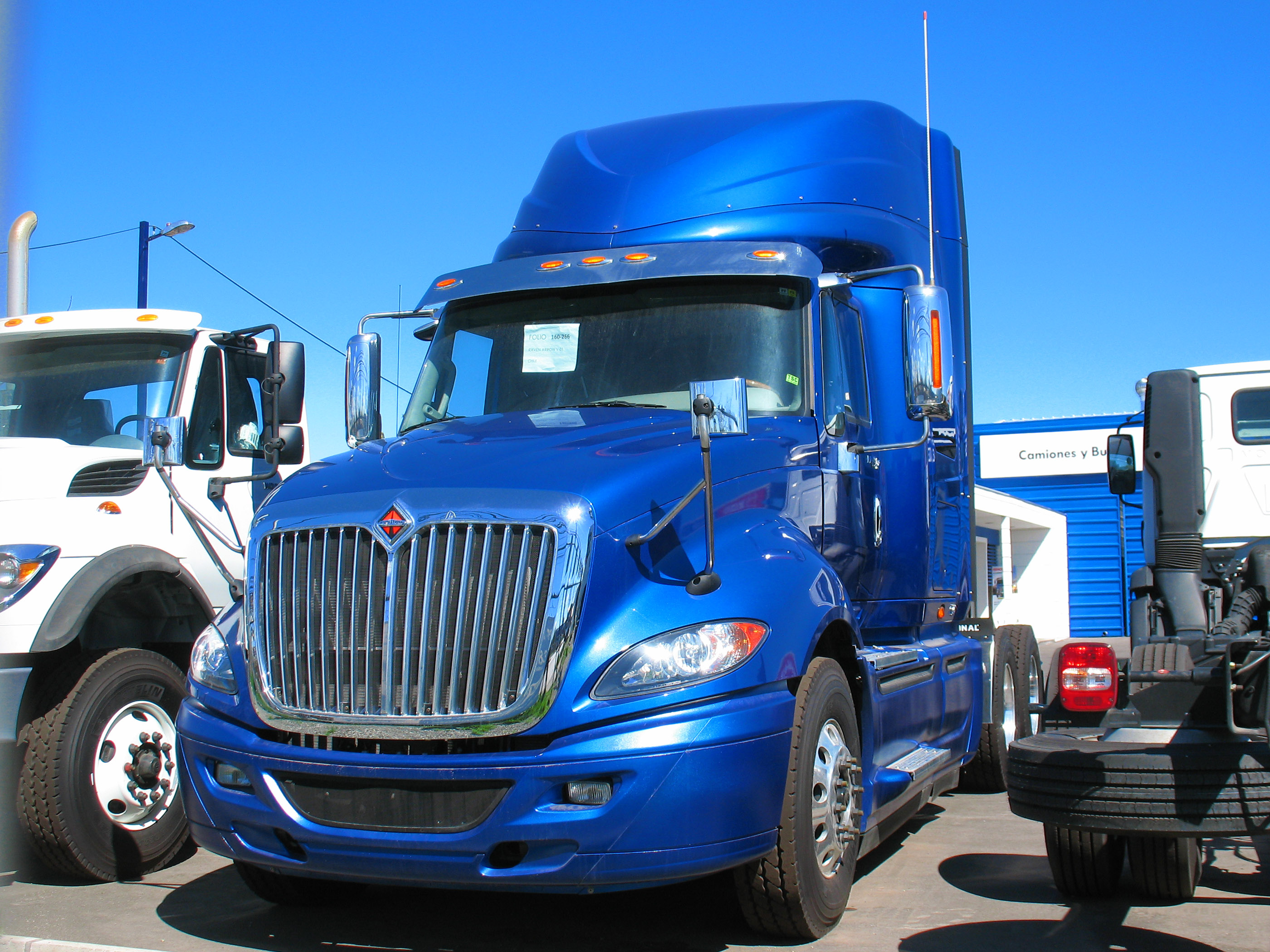
2013 International ProStar+

Sharing its NGV (Next-Generation Vehicle) cab with the TranStar, LoneStar, and DuraStar, the ProStar was developed as a $300 million project to produce the most fuel-efficient Class 8 truck in North America, along with improving driver ergonomics and reducing maintenance complexity.

For both day-cab and multiple sleeper-cab configurations, the ProStar was based on a 122-inch BBC dimension with a set-back front axle. The model line is powered by the MaxxForce 11 and 13 diesels, along with the Cummins ISX15 diesel. For 2015, Navistar introduced its N13 diesel as an option, replacing the MaxxForce engines.

In 2010, the ProStar was renamed the ProStar+ as part of a model revision. Coinciding with emissions and fuel-economy refinements (including 700 pounds of weight reduction), the ProStar+ received updates to the interior to increase interior functionality. For 2015, a second revision was introduced as an option, making it the ProStar ES (Efficiency Specification). Coupled with further exterior aerodynamic enhancements, the ProStar ES achieved further fuel economy gains nearly through engine and transmission controls; an automated manual transmission was standard.

In the New Zealand market, the successor to the ProStar is the RH, rather than the LT. Introduced in 2023, it utilities the RH cab and an updated right hand drive instrument panel

== International LT (2017-present) ==
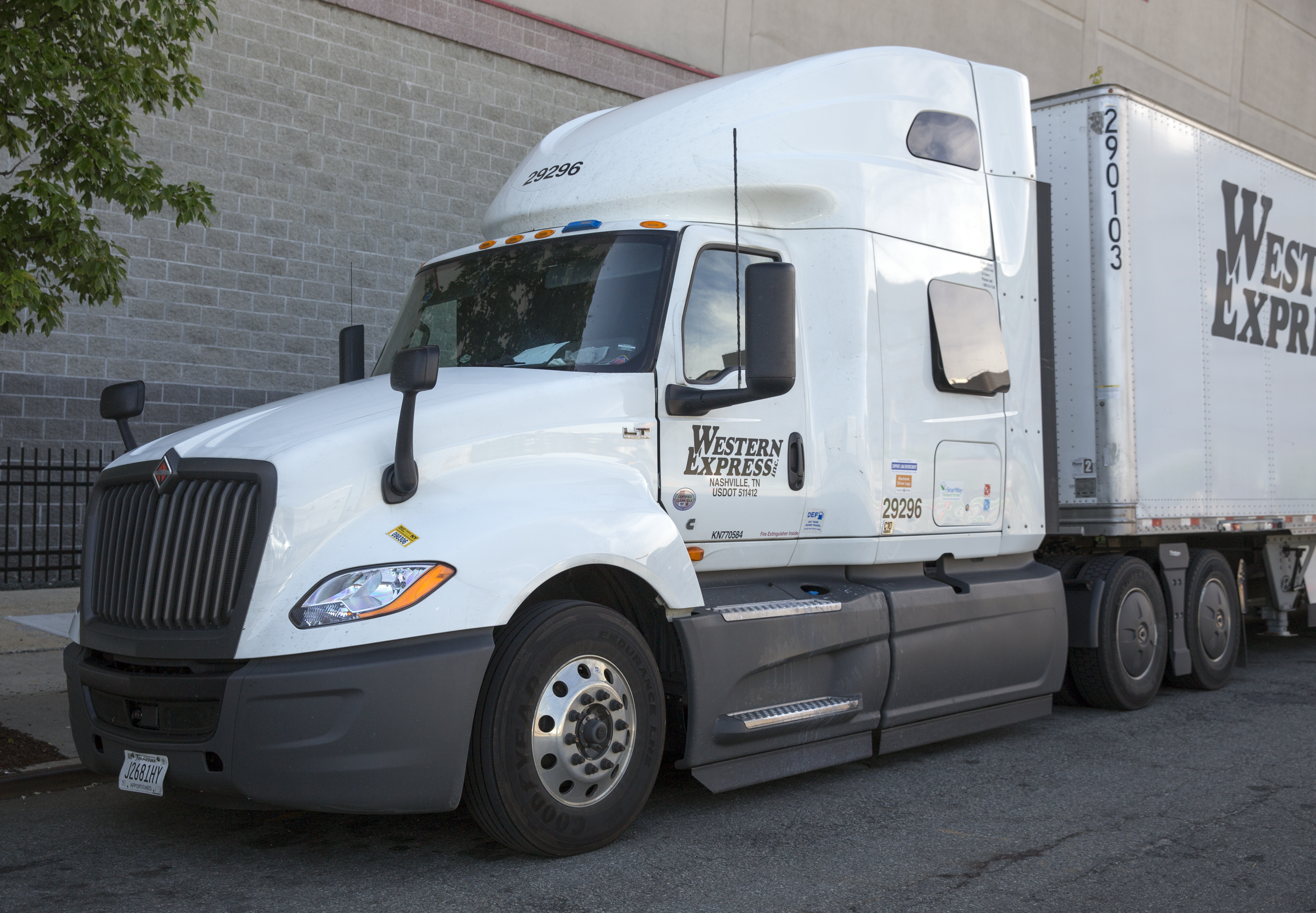
2019 International LT625

Introduced for 2017 production, the International LT serves as the replacement for the ProStar. Using the NGV cab (under a substantial revision), the LT improves its fuel economy over 7% over the ProStar+, intended to save an operator over $2000 per year in fuel costs. Replacing the ISX15, the standard engine is a Cummins X15, with a Navistar N13 returning as an option.There is also an option for the International A26 engine, which serves as the successor to the MaxxForce series.

Again configured for long-distance highway use, the LT is produced in day-cab and sleeper-cab configurations.
