= Lone Star, Virginia =

Unincorporated community in Virginia, United States

Lone Star
- Unincorporated community
- Location within the Commonwealth of Virginia Lone Star (the United States)
- Coordinates: 37°27′43″N 79°59′35″W
- Country: United States
- State: Virginia
- County: Botetourt
- Time zone: UTC−5 (Eastern (EST))
  - Summer (DST): UTC−4 (EDT)

Lone Star is an unincorporated community in Botetourt County, Virginia, United States.
