= Lone Star, Wise County, Texas =

Lone Star, Texas
- Ghost town
- Location within Texas Location within the United States
- Coordinates: 33°16′58″N 97°42′36″W
- Country: United States
- State: Texas
- County: Wise
- Elevation: 509 ft (155 m)
- Time zone: UTC-6 (Central (CST))
  - Summer (DST): UTC-5 (CDT)
- ZIP code: 76234
- Area code: 940
- FIPS code: 1

Lone Star is a ghost town in Wise County, the community is on Farm Road 1810 between Decatur and Chico. The Cemetery and church are the only remaining structures.
