= International 9000 =

International 9000 series
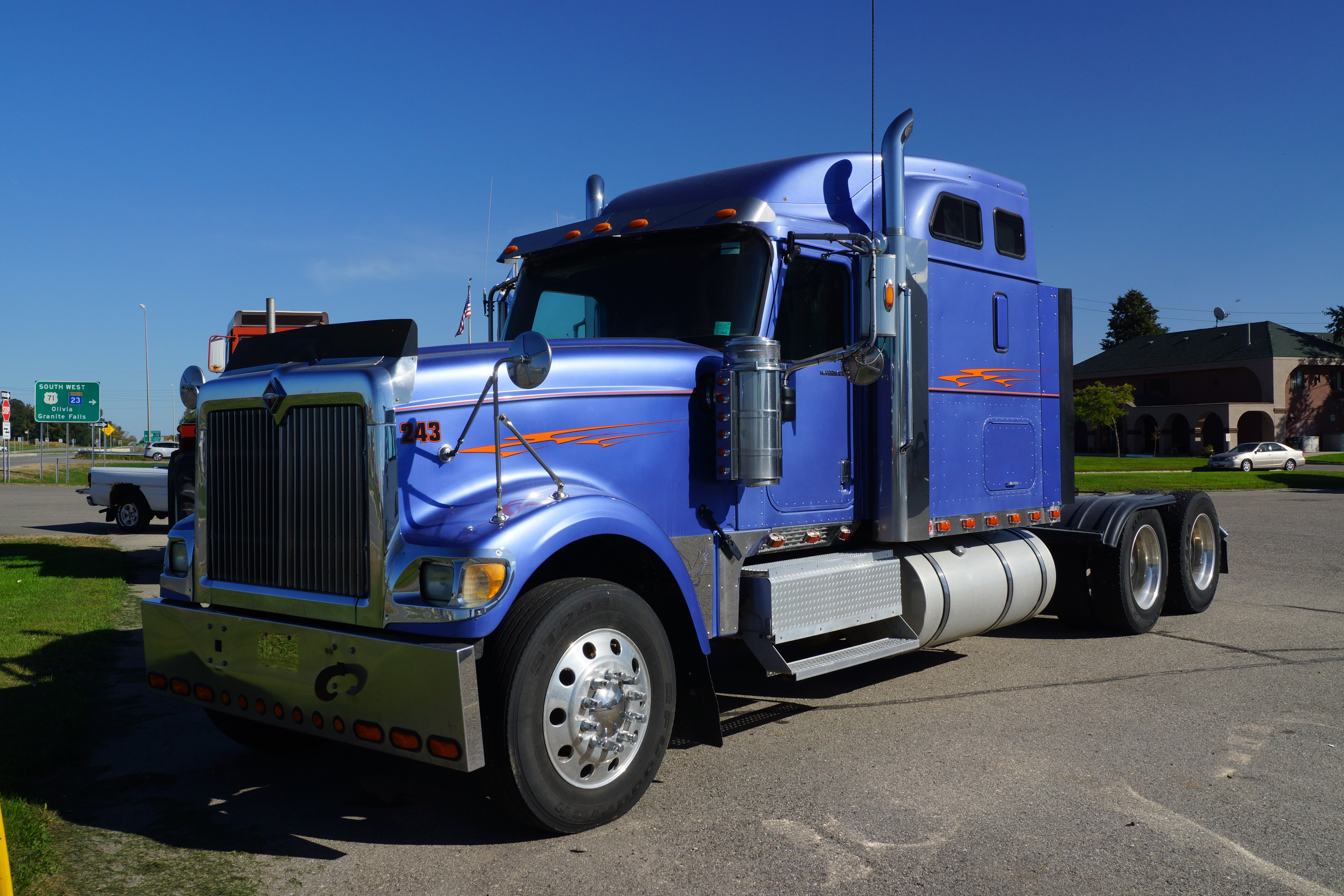
- 2005 International 9900ix Eagle

Overview
- Type: Conventional cab
- Manufacturer: International Harvester; Navistar International
- Production: 1971–2017
- Model years: 1971-2017
- Assembly: Canada: Chatham, Ontario

Body and chassis
- Class: Class 8
- Related: International Paystar; International 9000 (COE)

Powertrain
- Engine: Cummins KT, Caterpillar 3408
- Transmission: Eaton Fuller manual (9-16 speed)

Chronology
- Predecessor: International Transtar 400
- Successor: International ProStar; International LoneStar

The International 9000 Series is a range of trucks that was manufactured by Navistar International (previously International Harvester) from 1971 to 2017. A conventional-cab truck, the model range was configured primarily for highway applications. In terms of size, the model range was slotted between the medium-duty Loadstar (and the S-Series that replaced it) and severe-service Paystar series.

Through its production, International Harvester (and later Navistar) produced the model line in three distinct generations. Offered in multiple layouts, the Transtar 4000/9000 series was offered with single or tandem drive axles, multiple hood lengths, and multiple cab configurations (day cabs or various sizes of sleeper cabs).

During the 2000s, International phased out much of the model line in favor of the NGV-cab ProStar and LoneStar model lines; after a 46-year production run, the final 9900i was produced in 2017.

== First generation (Transtar; 1971–1980s) ==
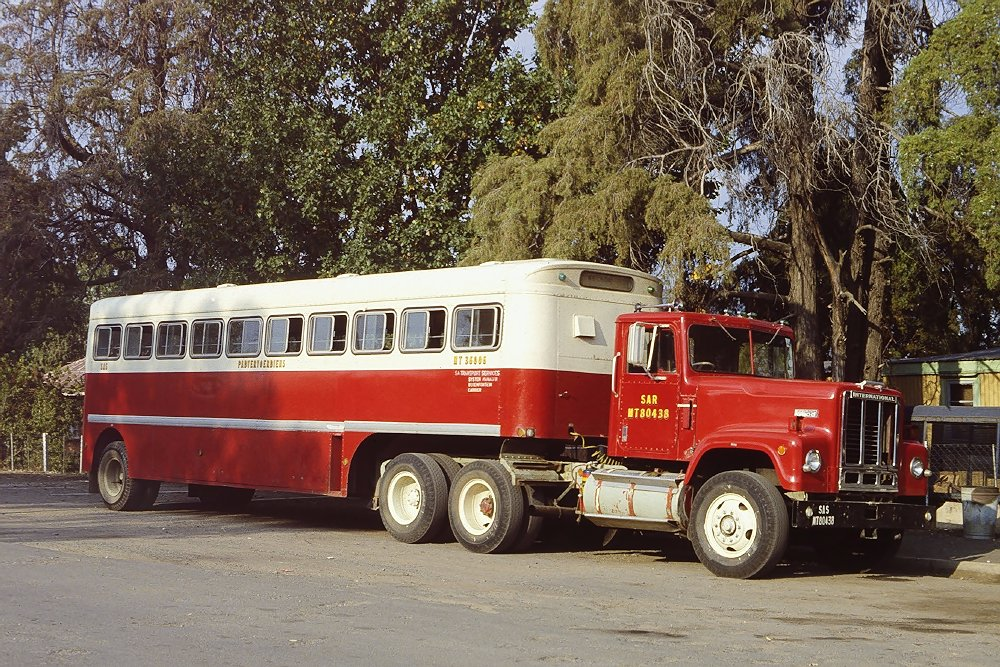
International Transtar 4300 (with trailer bus)

In 1971, International introduced the Transtar 4200/4300 series as its heavy-duty conventional. Replacing the Transtar 400 (an update of the D-400 introduced in 1961), the 1971 Transtar introduced an all-new cab, replacing the "Emeryville" cab (introduced in 1957). The model line was introduced as a standard-length Transtar 4270 and an extended-hood Transtar 4370. A steel cab was standard; an aluminum cab was optional.

In 1972, the severe-service Paystar 5000 adopted the cab of the Transtar; the 9000-series COEs introduced in 1981 sourced its doors from the model line.

At its launch, the Transtar 4200/4300 was offered with a range of diesel engines; the 4200 was fitted with standard V8 engines and inline-6 engines for the longer-hood 4300. The initial standard engine for the 4270 was a 260hp Detroit Diesel 8V71 V8; the 4370 was fitted with a 230hp Cummins NH inline-6 as standard. At its launch, the 4370 was able to be fitted with a 434hp Detroit Diesel 12V71 V12. The engines were paired with manual transmissions, ranging from 5 to 16 speeds (along with an optional 4-speed auxiliary transmission).

At the end of the 1970s, the 4300 was offered with some of the largest-displacement diesel engines ever fitted in a road-going vehicle, including the 450 hp Cummins KT inline-6 (1150 cubic inches) and the Caterpillar 3408 V8 (1099 cubic inches).

== Second generation (1984–1999) ==
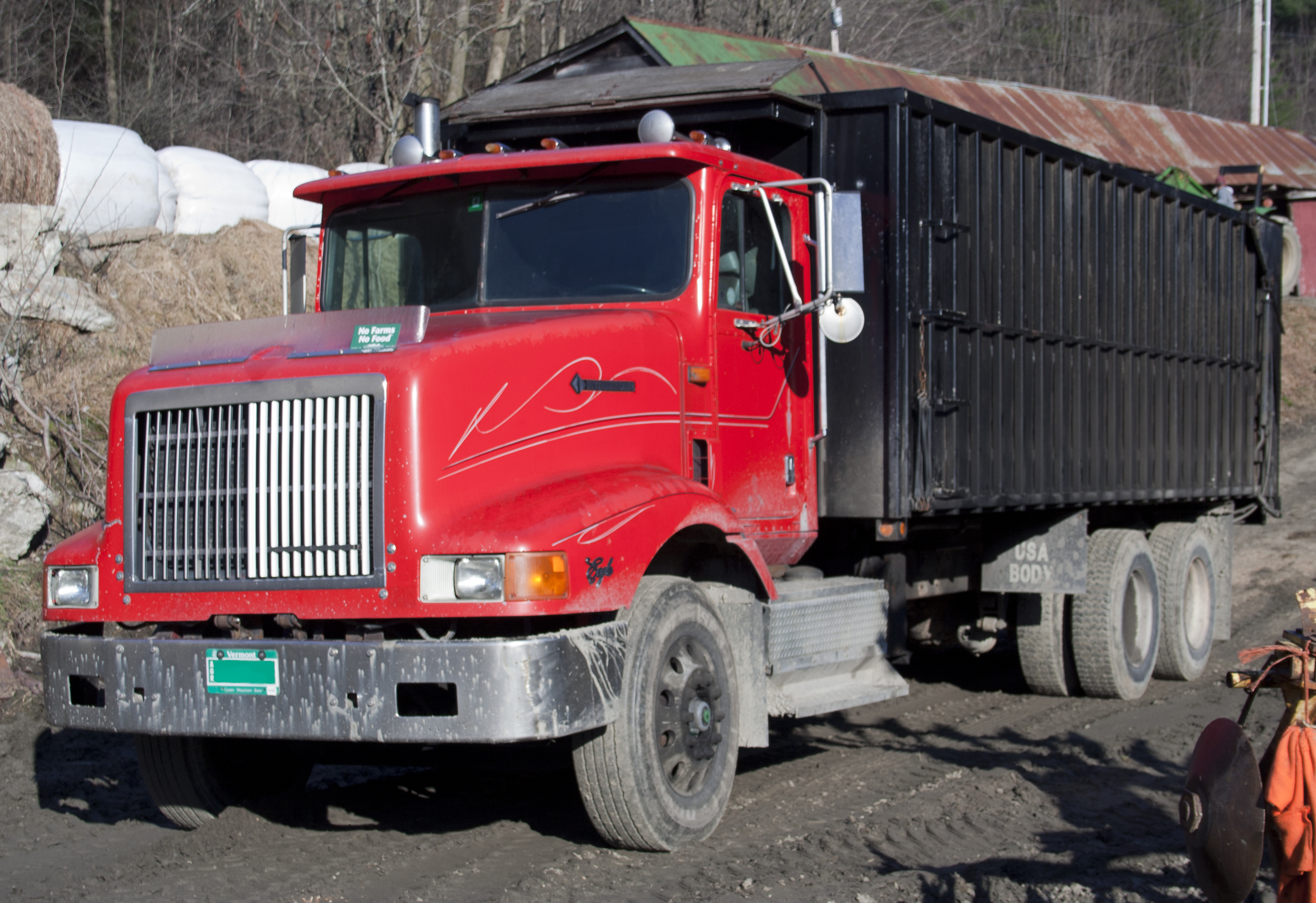
1990s International 9400 Eagle farm truck

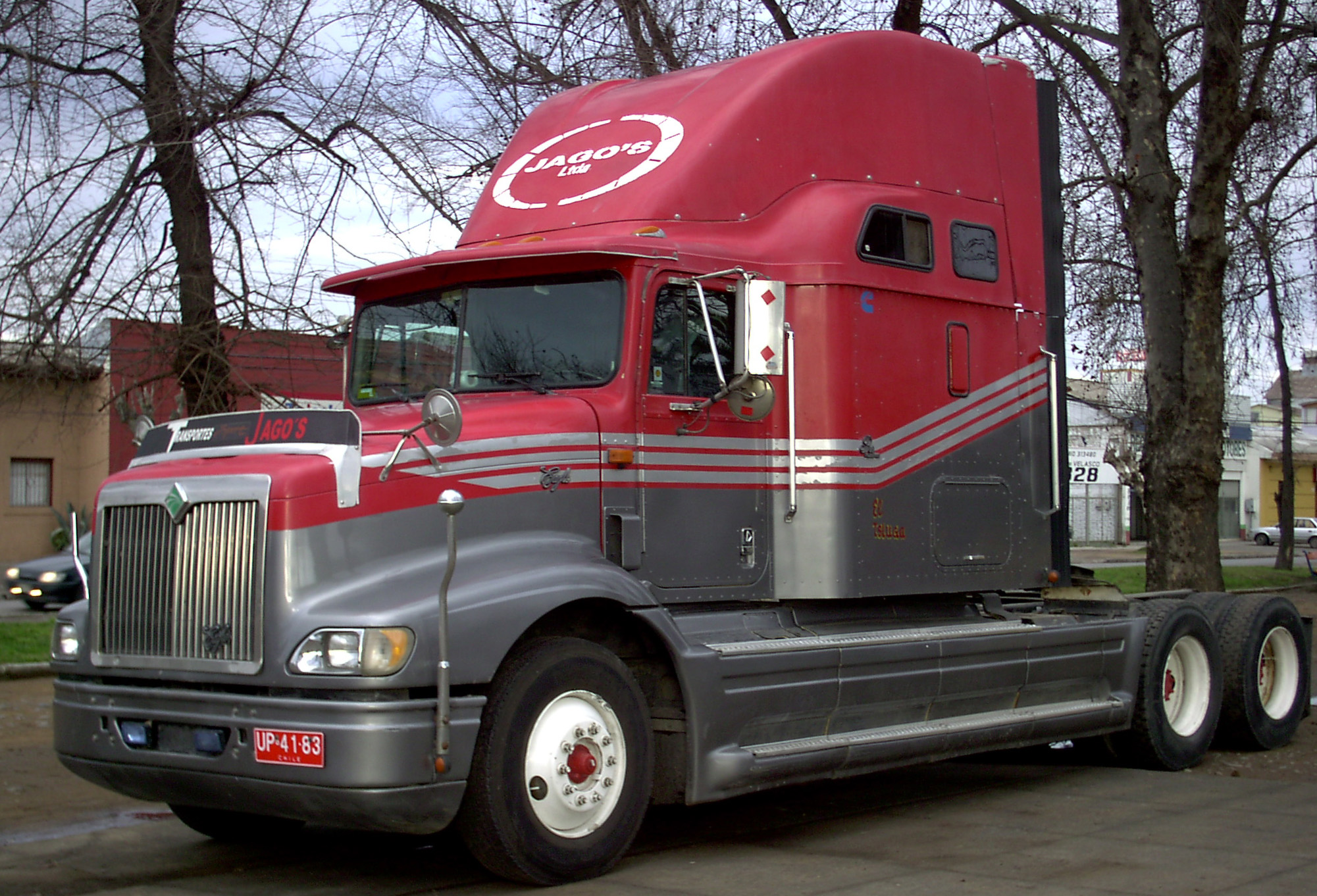
1998 International 9200 Eagle (facelift)

Following the corporate transition of International Harvester to Navistar, the Transtar 4370 series was rebranded as the International 9370; alongside the retirement of the Transtar name, the standard-length 4270 was discontinued. The cab structure was carried over, with Navistar adding a more prominent hood and grille (distinguished by vertically-stacked headlamps).

In 1989, Navistar introduced several changes to the model line; in line with other International product lines, the 9370 was renamed the International 9300. For the first time, a set-back front axle configuration was offered.

In 1990, the 9400 was introduced as a second conventional to the 9000 series. The first Class 8 aerodynamic conventional from International, the 9400 featured a set-back front axle and a sloped hood. Though less radical in design than the Ford Aeromax or the Kenworth T600, the 9400 further improved aerodynamics through optional skirted fuel tanks.

In 1992, the luxuriously appointed 9400 Midnight Eagle Limited Edition was introduced; offered only with the Caterpillar 3406 diesel engine, it had a leather interior with wood trim and a fully color-coordinated exterior.

In 1993, several changes were made to the model line. The 9200 was introduced as a shorter-hood version of the 9400; International dropped the set-back front axle configuration of the 9300.

In 1997, the 9100 was introduced, produced primarily in a day cab configuration. The same year, the 9000 series (with the exception of the 9300) received an exterior update, including a redesign of the grille, front bumper, and headlamp surrounds.

For 1999, the 9900 was introduced to replace the 9300; again fitted with a squared-off long hood, the twin headlights were surrounded by chrome trim faired into the fenders.

== Third generation (i-series; 2000–2017) ==
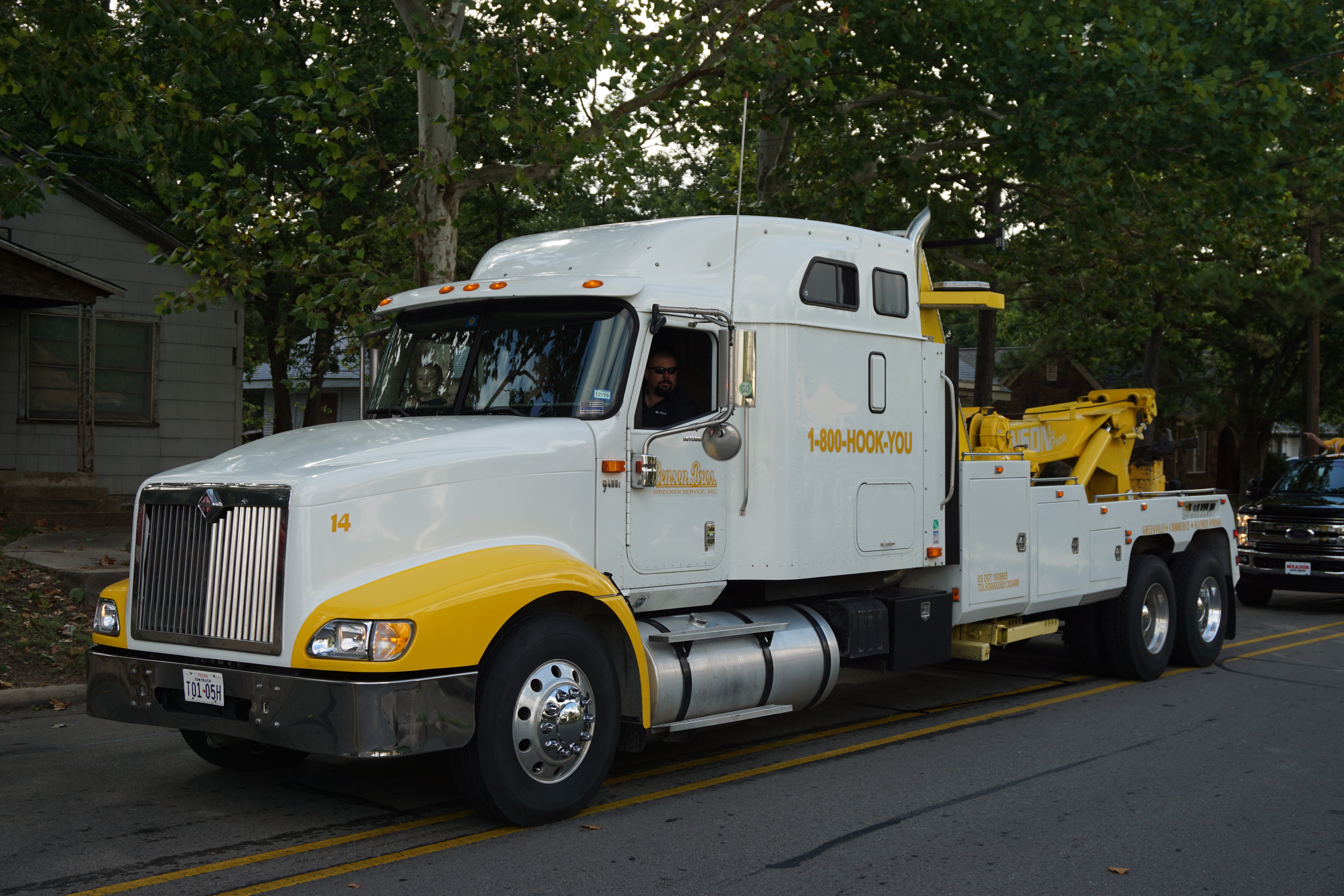
International 9400i tow truck

For 2000, International introduced the third generation of its Class 8 highway trucks, distinguished by an "i" suffix. Previewed by the 1997 update to the 9200/9400 and the 1999 introduction of the 9900, the redesign was the most extensive update since the 1971 introduction of the model range. While sharing the underlying aluminum structure of the cab, many changes were focused on improving driver visibility and comfort. To enlarge the drivers' compartment, the firewall of the cab was moved forward; this change replaced two-pane flat windshield glass with a single-piece curved design (along with cowl-mounted wipers). To improve outward visibility, the base of the windshield was lowered (along with the lower half of the door windows); in another change, vent windows were deleted.

For its 2000 launch, the model launch consisted of the 9100i (112-inch BBC), 9200i (112-inch BBC), 9400i (120-inch BBC), 9900i (120-inch BBC), and 9900ix (130-inch BBC). Sold primarily for regional use, the 9100i was offered only as a daycab (no sleeper). In contrast to the rest of the sloped-hood model line, the 9900i and 9900ix were configured with straight hoods, and the 9900ix was offered only with premium Eagle trim. As with its predecessors, the third generation shared its cab with the Paystar severe-service truck (renamed 5000i).

During the 2000s and 2010s, International began to phase out the 9000 series in favor of newer designs based on its NGV cab. After 2002, the 9100i was dropped (functionally replaced by the 8000 series, later TranStar). The 9400i and 9200i were discontinued after 2007 and 2011, respectively (directly replaced by the NGV-based ProStar enhanced aerodynamic conventional).

From 2012 to 2017, the sole remaining model of the 9000i series was the 9900i Eagle. The closest model in design to the 1971 Transtar 4370, the 2017 9900i was fitted with a Cummins ISX15 inline-6 with up to 600 hp with either manual or automated transmissions.

After 2017, International ended production of the 9000 series entirely with no direct successor. The role of the extended-hood International Class 8 highway conventional is currently served by the NGV-cab International Lonestar (introduced in 2009); far different in design from the ProStar, the LoneStar is an aerodynamic conventional that commemorates the design of its large trucks from the late 1930s.
