= Lone Star, Kaufman County, Texas =

Lone Star, Texas
- Unincorporated community
- Location within Texas Location within the United States
- Coordinates: 32°37′54″N 96°20′55″W
- Country: United States
- State: Texas
- County: Kaufman
- Elevation: 433 ft (132 m)
- Time zone: UTC-6 (Central (CST))
  - Summer (DST): UTC-5 (CDT)
- GNIS feature ID: 2034703

Lone Star is an unincorporated community in Kaufman County, located in the U.S. state of Texas.
