= Lone star flag =

Flag of Texas

Bonnie Blue flag

Lone Star of California

Estelada

Flag of Liberia

Flag of Chile

Flag of Cuba

The Lone Star flag may refer to:

== United States ==
- Flag of Texas, commonly known as the Lone Star Flag
- Bonnie Blue flag, associated at various times with the Republic of Texas, the Republic of West Florida, and the Confederate States of America
- Lone Star of California, used during an 1836 independence movement from Mexico

== Other countries ==
- Estelada or the Lone Star Flag, the unofficial flag of Catalan independence supporters
- Flag of Chile, or La Estrella Solitaria 'the Lone Star'
- Flag of Cuba, or La Estrella Solitaria 'the Lone Star'
- Flag of Liberia, sometimes called the Lone Star

== See also ==
- Lone Star (disambiguation)
- Red star
