= The Lone Star (newspaper) =

Former newspaper published in El Paso, Texas

Coordinates: 31.756518°N 106.489098°W

- "Hew to the line, let the chips fall where they may."
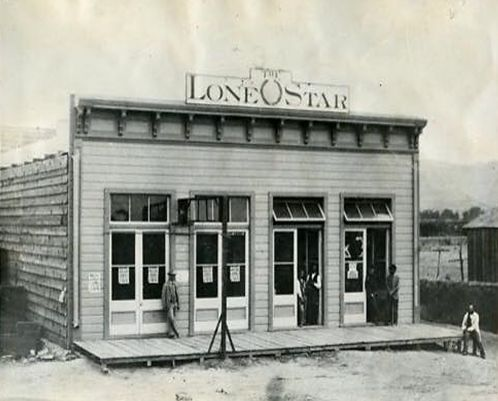
- Office on 10 W. Overland St, c. 1882
- Format: volumes; Broadsheet (61cm)
- Founder: Simeon Newman
- Publisher: Newman & Shannon
- Founded: October 12, 1881
- Ceased publication: January 6, 1886; 140 years ago
- Language: English
- Headquarters: 10 West Overland Street
- City: El Paso, Texas
- Country: United States
- ISSN: 2998-2332
- OCLC number: 13658075

The Lone Star was a semiweekly newspaper published in El Paso, Texas, from 1881 to 1886. It was founded and edited by Simeon Newman, a Kentucky native born in 1846. Known for its pugnacious and reform-minded stance, The Lone Star played a significant role in El Paso's early development.

== Early History and New Mexico Roots ==
Before its establishment in El Paso, Texas, the newspaper that would become The Lone Star operated under different names and in various locations within New Mexico.

In 1871, Simeon H. Newman began his career as an apprentice newspaperman for Ashton Upson at the Weekly Mail in Las Vegas, New Mexico. After only six weeks, Upson sold the paper to Newman. As a 25-year-old editor-in-chief, Newman gained experience in the newspaper trade through self-instruction.

In 1878, Newman moved the newspaper to Mesilla, New Mexico, where it was published as El Demócrata, a Spanish-language political campaign paper. Subsequently, Newman relocated the publication to Las Cruces, New Mexico, and established Thirty-Four, an English-language newspaper. He continued to publish Thirty-Four until the newspaper's relocation to El Paso, at which point it was rebranded as The Lone Star.

== Establishment ==
In 1881, Newman relocated his existing newspaper operation from New Mexico to El Paso, rebranding his paper as The Lone Star. El Paso already had two established newspapers, The El Paso Times and the El Paso Herald. The Lone Star was first published in a building at 10 W. Overland Street in El Paso.

== Legacy and impact ==
The Lone Star became a significant force in El Paso, demonstrating its influence through consistent Democratic Party support, notably backing Joseph Magoffin's successful 1883 mayoral campaign. The Lone Star's motto was "Hew the line and let the chips fall where they may." The newspaper also was instrumental in such history-altering events as the moving of the county seat from Ysleta to El Paso, connecting the city with railroads, and establishment of the first permanent school building in El Paso. Beyond politics, The Lone Star gained notoriety as a moral authority, crusading against vice, including prostitution, public intoxication, and violence. The Lone Star also advocated for public safety in the city by criticizing the prevalent use of firearms and the effects of alcohol.

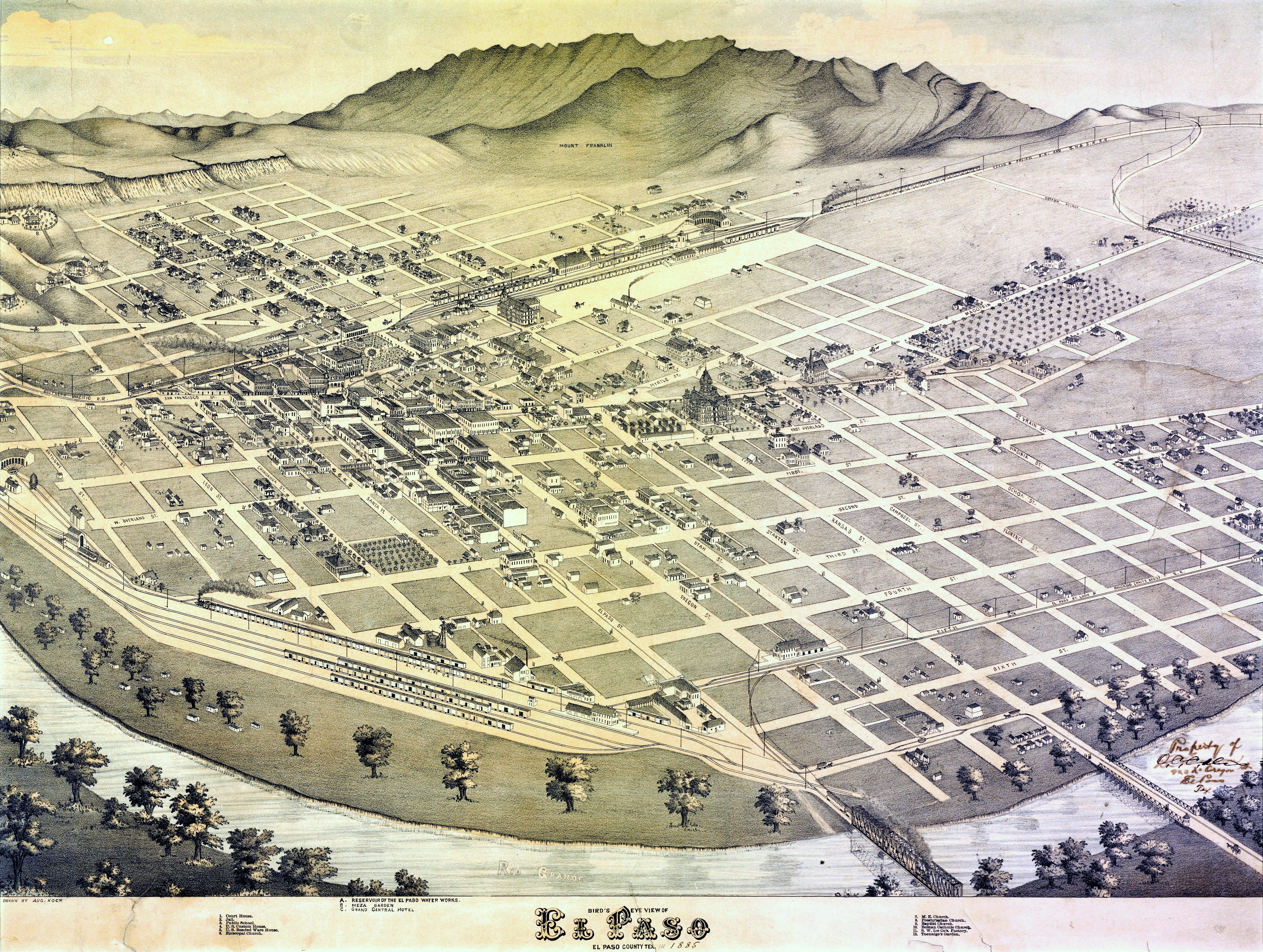
Map of El Paso in 1886

== End of local coverage ==
The Lone Star ceased publication on 6 January 1886.
