= Lone Star (steamer) =

History
- Name: Lone Star
- Fate: Wrecked 16 September 1865

General characteristics
- Type: Steamboat

The Lone Star was a steamer that was wrecked 6 miles (9.7 km) north of Red Fish Bar near Galveston, Texas, on September 16, 1865.
