= Springfield Assembly Plant =

- Built: 1966
- Operated: 1966–2026
- Location: 6125 Urbana Road; Springfield, Ohio, United States
- Coordinates: 40°1′8″N 83°47′29″W
- Industry: Automotive
- Products: trucks
- Employees: 2,725 (2002)
- Area: 500 acres (200 ha)
- Volume: 2,000,000 square feet (190,000 m^{2})
- Owner: Navistar International
- Defunct: September 30, 2026

Springfield Assembly Plant was an truck manufacturing plant in Springfield, Ohio, owned by Navistar International. This was the last former International Harvester facility still in use by Navistar.

== History ==
The plant traces its roots to 1921 when International Harvester converted its historical East Street plant in Springfield to focus on motor truck manufacturing.

In February 1966, International Harvester opened its new Springfield Works assembly plant on Route 68 north of Springfield as its second major manufacturing facility in the city.

On September 27, 1982, International Harvester decided to retain and consolidate its truck production at the assembly plant in Springfield, Ohio, while closing its older plant in Fort Wayne, Indiana.

In 1999, Navistar laid off more than 550 workers in the area due to severe shortages of automatic transmissions from a key supplier. Allison Transmission, the supplier for Navistar's medium-duty trucks and school buses, could not keep up with booming industry demand.

In September 2000, Navistar International announced that it would lay off up to 500 employees at its Springfield, Ohio, truck assembly plant due to a significant slowdown in truck demand. Also in the same year, Navistar announced plans to cut 1,851 jobs at its Springfield assembly plant over the following three years.

In August 2002, Navistar announced it will terminate 750 to 800 workers at the plant by September 2002, closing a nearby body plant in the same area, and ending heavy-truck production at the facility to help offset a third-quarter financial loss and restore profitability. At the time, the company employed 2,725 workers across two Springfield facilities, which included a truck assembly plant and a nearby body plant.

In September 2007, Navistar notified workers at the Springfield, Ohio, truck assembly plant that they would be temporarily laid off as talks with the United Auto Workers (UAW) stalled. The final truck rolled off the line on September 27, 2007, just before the master labor contract expired.

In early 2017, Navistar began assembly of the Chevrolet Express and GMC Savana cutaway vans (previously made at Wentzville Assembly, Wentzville, Missouri) at its Springfield plant, adding at least 300 jobs and recommissioning a second production line. In December 2018, the plant started building the first-ever, medium-duty Chevrolet Silverado trucks (the 4500HD, 5500HD, and 6500HD).

In March 2026, International Truck announced it will sell its Springfield, Ohio, truck manufacturing plant to Roshel on October 2, 2026, and will terminate 1,341 workers at the plant. The plant closed on September 30, 2026.

== Products made ==
- International Loadstar (1961–1978)
- Chevrolet Express/GMC Savana (cutaway chassis) (2017–2026)
- Chevrolet Sliverado HD Medium Duty/International CV Series (2018–2026)
- International MV Series
