= Scott Donnelly =

Scott Donnelly may refer to:

- Scott Donnelly (footballer)
- Scott Donnelly (soccer coach)
- Scott C. Donnelly, chief executive officer of Textron
