= Garland Truck Plant =

- Operated: 1963–2013
- Location: 4030 Forest Lane; Garland, Texas, United States
- Coordinates: 32°54′27″N 96°41′25″W
- Industry: Automotive
- Products: trucks
- Employees: 900 (2012)
- Area: 50 acres (20 ha)
- Volume: 681,000 square feet (63,300 m^{2})
- Owner: Navistar International

Garland Truck Plant was a truck manufacturing plant in Garland, Texas owned by Navistar International.

== History ==
The plant was originally constructed by the Marmon Motor Company and was their primary assembly until 1997 when they were absorbed into Navistar.

In October 2012, Navistar announced it would close its truck manufacturing plant in Garland, Texas, and lay off employees at the plant, shifting production to Springfield, Ohio, and Escobedo, Mexico. The plant was closed in 2013.

In November 2014, Navistar sold the property to real estate investors Dollar-Flowers Realty Partners.

== Products made ==
- International LoneStar
- International TranStar
- International WorkStar
- International Paystar
