= San Antonio Manufacturing Plant =

- Built: 2020–2022
- Operated: 2022–present
- Location: 14607 South US Highway 281; San Antonio, Texas, United States
- Coordinates: 29.2754°N 98.4751°W
- Industry: Automotive
- Products: trucks
- Employees: 600
- Area: 426 acres (172 ha)
- Volume: 900,000 square feet (84,000 m^{2})
- Owner: Navistar International

San Antonio Manufacturing Plant is a truck manufacturing plant in San Antonio, Texas owned by International Motors. This facility was the first opened by Navistar in decades. Designed so that both electric and conventional trucks can be assembled on the same line.

== History ==
On June 25, 2020, Navistar broke ground on its new $250 million manufacturing facility in San Antonio, Texas, with a virtual groundbreaking ceremony due to the COVID-19 pandemic.

The plant was officially opened on March 23, 2022, bringing over 600 initial workers to the area.

== Products made ==
- International MV Series (2022–present)
- International HV Series
- International LT Series
- International RH Series
