= Huntsville Powertrain Manufacturing Plant =

- Operated: 2008–present
- Location: 485 Short Pike Road Southwest; Huntsville, Alabama, United States
- Coordinates: 34°39′53″N 86°46′2″W
- Industry: Automotive
- Products: engines
- Employees: 230
- Area: 80 acres (32 ha)
- Volume: 410,000 square feet (38,000 m^{2})
- Owner: International Motors

Huntsville Powertrain Manufacturing Plant is an engine manufacturing plant in Huntsville, Alabama, owned by International Motors. The facility is located on the Jetplex Industrial Park.

== History ==
=== Original plant ===
In 2002, Navistar opened its 700,000-square-foot "Vee Engine" plant in Huntsville, Alabama for V6 and V8 production.

In February 2014, the company announced it will consolidate medium-duty engine production at its engine plant in Melrose Park, Illinois. Navistar idled its original mid-range engine facility, which cut 280 jobs.

=== Current plant ===
On October 25, 2006, Navistar International announced it will build big-bore diesel engines at its new engine plant in Huntsville, Alabama.

In September 2008, Navistar opened its new, 300,000-square-foot engine plant in Huntsville, Alabama, on a 30-acre site, to produce big-bore diesel engines like the MaxxForce 11 and MaxxForce 13. The company has invested more than $200 million in the facility over the years.

In 2019, Navistar invested $125 million to expand its engine and powertrain manufacturing plant in Huntsville, Alabama, adding 110,000 square feet of manufacturing space and creating 145 new jobs. The company broke ground on its expansion in early 2020, and was completed in 2023.

Also in 2023, the plant launched production of the S13 integrated powertrain.

== Products made ==
- A26 engine
- S13 integrated powertrain
