= Melrose Park Engine Plant =

- Operated: 1941–2018
- Location: 10400 West North Avenue; Melrose Park, Illinois, United States
- Coordinates: 41°54′31″N 87°52′43″W
- Industry: Automotive
- Products: engines
- Employees: 1,000 (2008)
- Area: 125 acres (51 ha)
- Volume: 2,000,000 square feet (190,000 m^{2})
- Owner: Navistar International
- Defunct: 2018 (engine plant); 2021 (technical center)

Melrose Park Engine Plant was an engine manufacturing plant in Melrose Park, Illinois, owned by Navistar International.

== History ==
The facility was originally built as a Buick Aviation plant, following the Second World War, International purchased the facility in 1946 and used it as the headquarters for their engine group. The main facility was broken into two sections one being engine test cells and later truck component testing and the other being engine production.

In 2010, Navistar invested up to $90 million to construct the state-of-the-art truck testing and validation center in Melrose Park, which integrated hundreds of out-of-state engineering jobs onto the campus. Navistar officially opened its renovated Test and Development Center in Melrose Park, Illinois, in July 2013.

In 2014, the company shifted engine production from Huntsville, Alabama into Melrose Park, which cut 280 jobs during the consolidation.

On August 3, 2017, Navistar announced it will close its engine manufacturing plant in Melrose Park, Illinois, and will lay off 170 workers at the plant. The plant stopped producing N9 and N10 medium-duty engines in 2018. It cut annual operating costs by roughly $12 million, with an initial restructuring charge of about $43 million.

On January 13, 2021, Navistar announced it will close its technical center in Melrose Park, Illinois, and will lay off 500 employees at the center, shifting its testing and validation work to newer operations such as its advanced technology center in San Antonio, Texas. The technical center was closed in November 2021, and the company sold its 84-acre campus in the same area to developer Connect CRE.

== Products made ==
- DT engine
  - DT 466
  - MaxxForce DT (2007–2016)

== 2001 shooting ==
On February 5, 2001, a mass shooting occurred at a Navistar engine plant in Melrose Park, Illinois, when former employee William Daniel Baker entered the facility and shot four employees and wounded four others with an SKS rifle before committing suicide.
