= International Motors =

American industrial company

International Motors, LLC

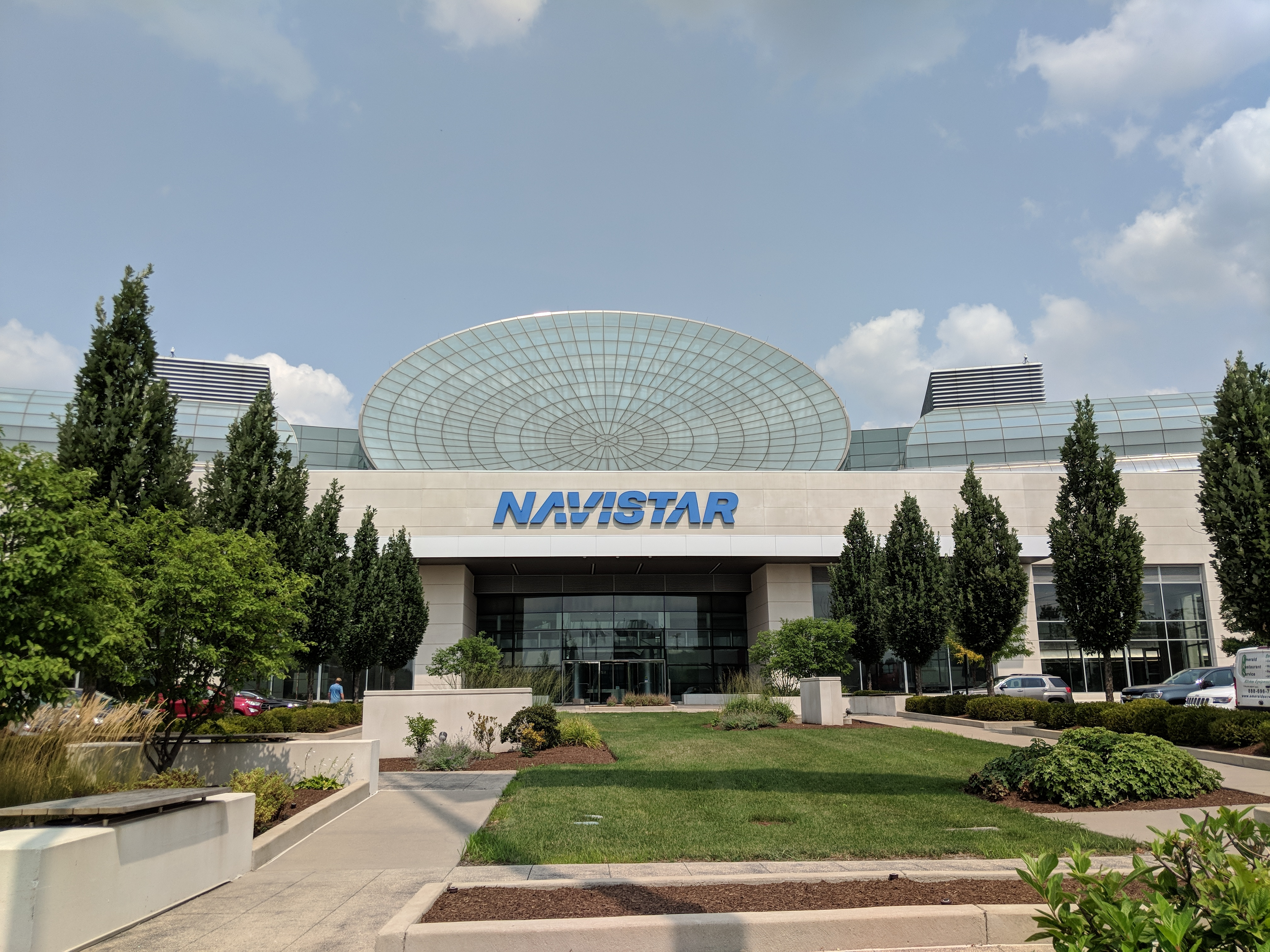
- International Motors headquarters building in Lisle, Illinois, U.S.
- Formerly: International Harvester Company (1902–1986); Navistar International Corporation (1986–2021); Navistar, Inc. (2021–2024)
- Type: Limited liability company
- Industry: Automotive
- Predecessor: International Harvester Company
- Founded: March 22, 1902; 124 years ago (as International Harvester Company); February 20, 1986; 40 years ago (as Navistar International Corporation)
- Headquarters: Lisle, Illinois, U.S.
- Area served: North America (except Cuba); South America
- Key people: Mathias Carlbaum; (president & CEO); Troy A. Clarke; (executive chairman); Walter G. Borst; (executive VP & CFO); Samara A. Strycker; (senior VP & Controller); Gabriel Duarte-Urrutia Executive VP & CHRO
- Products: Trucks, buses and school buses, diesel engines; and chassis
- Revenue: ▲US$8.57 billion; (FY Oct. 31, 2017)
- Operating income: ▲US$415 million; (FY Oct. 31, 2017)
- Net income: ▲US$55 million; (FY Oct. 31, 2017)
- Total assets: ▲US$6.14 billion; (FY Oct. 31, 2017)
- Total equity: ▲ −US$4.57 billion; (FY Oct. 31, 2017)
- Number of employees: ~14,500; (FY Oct. 31, 2024)
- Parent: Traton (Volkswagen AG)
- Website: www.international.com

International Motors, LLC (formerly Navistar International Corporation) is an American manufacturer of commercial vehicles and engines, established in 1986 as a successor to the International Harvester company. International Motors produces trucks under its own brand and buses under the IC Bus name. Since July 2021, the company has been an independent subsidiary of holding company Traton.

Headquartered in Lisle, Illinois, International Motors employs approximately 14,500 people worldwide as of 2024. The company maintains an extensive distribution network, with nearly 1,000 dealer outlets across the United States, Canada, Brazil, and Mexico, and over 60 dealers in 90 other countries. International Motors' product line includes a range of commercial trucks, from medium-duty Class 4 to heavy-duty Class 8 vehicles.

== History ==
=== 1902–1985: International Harvester ===
International Harvester (IH) was created in 1902 by the merger of McCormick Harvesting Machine Company, and Deering Harvester Company. In 1908, IH introduced the Auto Wagon, an early precursor to the pickup truck. Over the decades, IH became a diversified manufacturer, producing a wide range of vehicles from agricultural machinery to consumer-grade trucks and heavy-duty commercial vehicles. Notable products included the Farmall tractor, Cub Cadet lawn and garden equipment, and vehicles like the International Scout and International Travelall SUV. The company’s truck lineup ranged from light-duty vehicles (Light Line) to heavy-duty trucks. IH became a leading name in both agriculture and construction, further expanding with the development of the first sport-utility vehicles.

=== 1986: Rebranding to Navistar ===
Original logo of Navistar International

In the early to mid-1980s, IH faced financial struggles due to the poor agricultural economy and the lingering effects of the 1979–1980 strike. New chairman and CEO Louis W. Menk brought in a new management team, including president Donald Lennox, to oversee a restructuring process. As part of this reorganization, the company sold many of its divisions, including the Construction Equipment Division to Dresser Industries, the Solar gas turbine division to Caterpillar, and Cub Cadet lawn equipment to MTD Products. The company also entered into a 1983 supply agreement with Ford Motor Company, providing the 6.9L IDI diesel V8 for Ford's full-size trucks and vans, a move that continued until 2010.

In 1985, IH sold its Agricultural Division to Tenneco, the parent company of rival Case Corporation. The IHC name and logo became part of the sale, with Tenneco creating the Case IH brand. The remaining portions of the company, including the International Truck and Engine Divisions, rebranded as Navistar International Corporation on February 20, 1986. This new identity combined “Navi-” (for navigation) and “Star” (from multiple truck lines), and introduced an orange-red diamond logo. Navistar focused on trucks and engines, marking the beginning of a new era for the company.

In 1987, Navistar introduced the 8300, a second generation of the International S series, which was part of the “Thousand Series” trucks. These vehicles included Class 7/8 tractors and medium-duty 4000-series trucks, introduced in 1989. The Thousand-Series trucks featured improvements for better fuel economy, including aerodynamic hoods with faired-in headlamps, turn signals, and body-color grilles. After 1986, Navistar shifted to exclusively producing diesel-powered vehicles.

=== 1990s ===
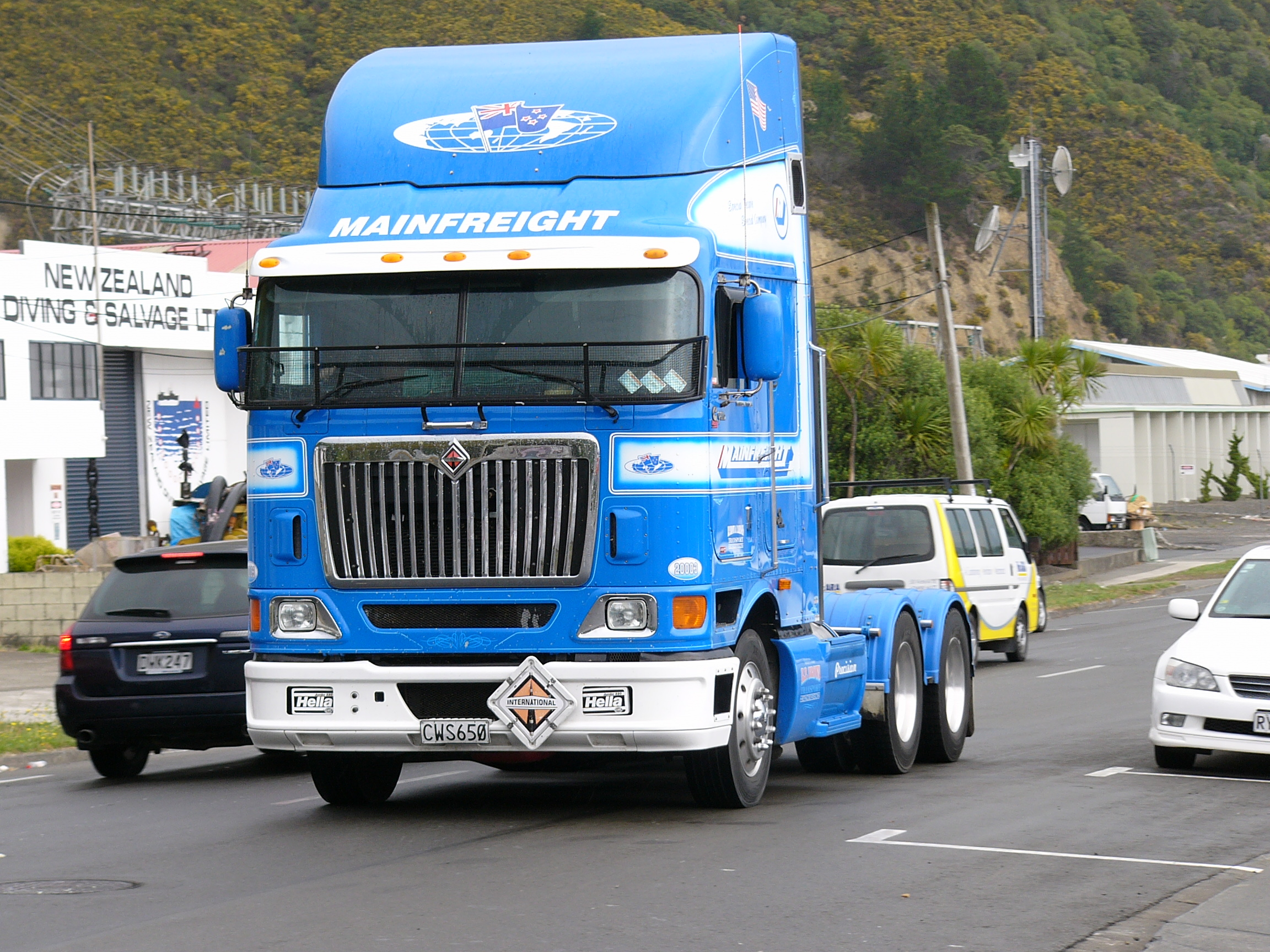
An International 9800 cabover truck in New Zealand

In 1990, International introduced the 9400, an aerodynamic Class 8 truck derived from the Transtar/Paystar cab, using a set-back front axle (to allow for a longer, sloped hood); the classic-style 9300 (the previous Transtar) continued. In 1991, the final remnant of International in the automotive segment was sold off, as the Scout and Light Truck parts business was sold to Scout/Light Line Distributors, Inc. The same year, Navistar became the parent company of a school bus manufacturer as it purchased one-third of American Transportation Corporation (AmTran).

Serving as a chassis supplier since the 1920s, Navistar gained significant market share in school bus production, acquiring AmTran entirely in April 1995. In 1994, the IDI diesel was replaced by the all-new T444E diesel V8. Sharing only displacement with its predecessor, the T444E introduced direct injection and standard turbocharging; the engine marked the introduction of the PowerStroke diesel branding for Ford vehicles. In 1998, following a decline in demand for COE trucks in North America, the 9800 was discontinued and production moved to Brazil.

=== 2000s ===
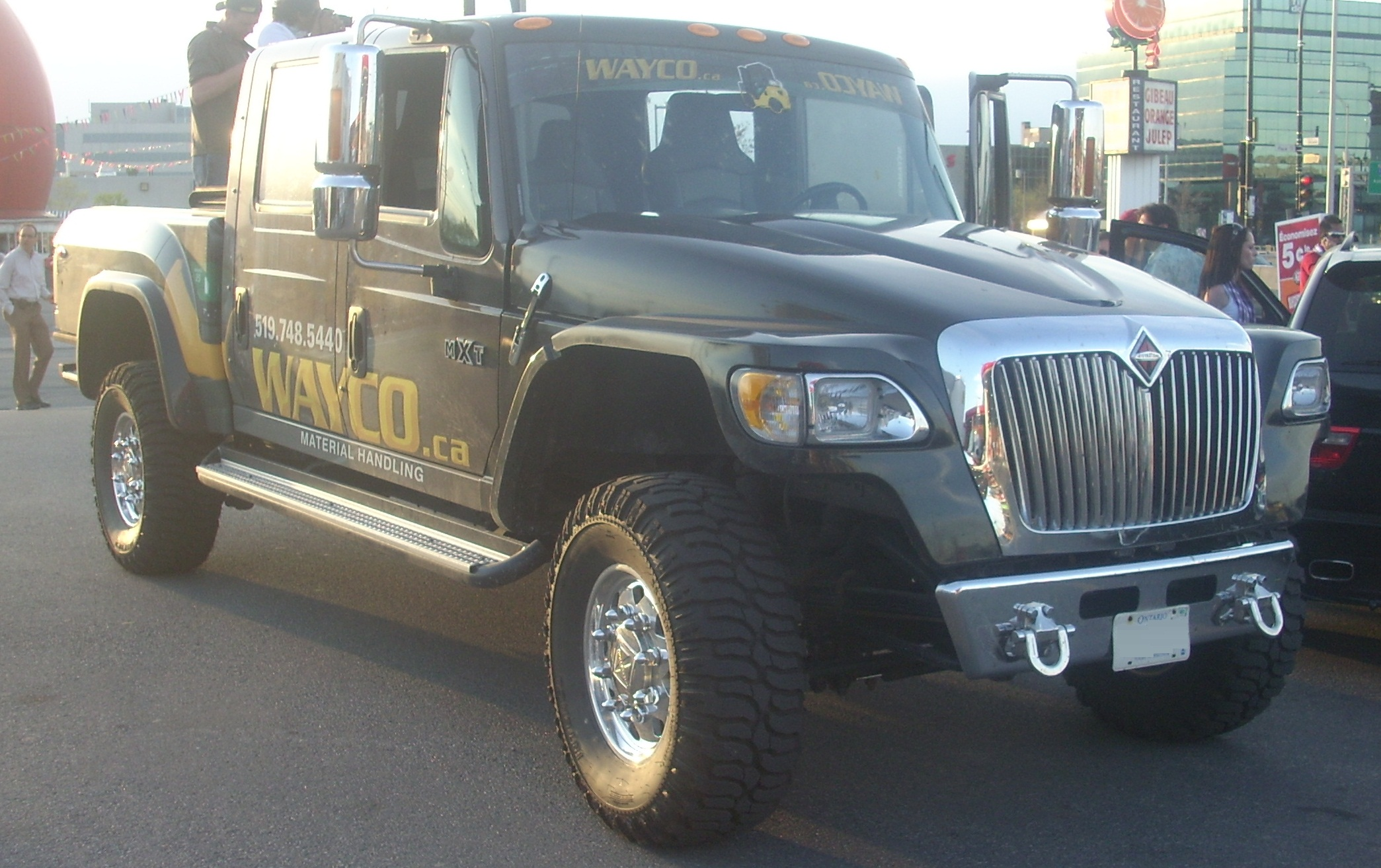
International MXT, the smallest of the XT pickup trucks

In 2000, Navistar announced plans to move its headquarters from Chicago to Warrenville, Illinois.

The 5000/9000-series trucks were redesigned in 2000, becoming the 5000i/9000i, and the "NGV" trucks were introduced in 2001 as the successor to the Thousand-Series. The S-Series continued through 2003 (severe-service) and 2004 (cowled bus chassis). In 2002, AmTran was rebranded as IC Bus. In 2004, Navistar reentered the consumer market with the International XT pickup trucks, including the CXT 4x4, RXT 4x2, and MXT 4x4. These models were the largest ever sold for consumer use, with the CXT being the tallest and the RXT the longest mass-produced pickup trucks.

In 2006, Navistar introduced the International ProStar long-haul tractor, replacing the 9400i, and began phasing out the "Thousand-Series" nomenclature. In 2008, the DuraStar replaced the 4000 series, and the WorkStar replaced the 7000 series, while the TranStar name was revived for regional-haul tractors. Sales of all three XT models ceased after 2008.

In 2005, Navistar purchased Workhorse Custom Chassis, LLC, a manufacturer of step-van and motor home chassis, to re-enter the delivery van market. Workhorse briefly offered the MetroStar chassis-body product. In 2012, Navistar shut down Workhorse to cut costs. AMP Electric Vehicles acquired Workhorse's assets in 2013, later rebranding as Workhorse Group Inc. in 2015.

=== 2010s ===
In 2010, Navistar revived plans to move its headquarters from Warrenville, IL, to Lisle, Illinois, creating 3,000 permanent jobs and 400 construction jobs. The company invested $110 million in the new campus, with $65 million in state incentives. In 2011, Navistar phased out its Truck Development and Technology Center (TDTC) in Fort Wayne, Indiana, laying off 130 employees. By 2015, the TDTC was closed with 300 employees relocating to Illinois, while others retired or found new work.

In June 2012, hedge fund MHR Fund Management LLC took a 13.6% stake in Navistar, triggering a poison pill defense. In August 2012, Navistar adopted Cummins engines and Selective Catalytic Reduction (SCR) technology. President Dan Ustian retired, and in September 2012, activist investor Carl Icahn criticized the company for mismanagement. Several executives left the company between 2012 and 2013, including Ustian and other key leaders.

Navistar faced layoffs and plant closures, including 500 jobs in August 2012 and 200 more in September 2012. The Garland, Texas plant closed in 2013, costing 900 jobs. Additional job cuts occurred between 2013 and 2014 as part of a broader cost-cutting plan.

Navistar cut SG&A costs by 16% in 2013 and product development spending by 24%. The company sold off non-core businesses, including its RV and Workhorse Chassis units. In 2014, Navistar moved engine production from Huntsville, Alabama to Melrose Park, Illinois, eliminating 280 jobs.

In 2014, General Motors and Navistar announced a partnership to develop medium-duty trucks, leveraging both companies' expertise. Production began in 2018 at Navistar’s Springfield, Ohio facility.

In 2016, Navistar entered a strategic alliance with Volkswagen Group's truck division, Traton SE, which purchased a 16.6% stake in Navistar for $256 million. This partnership aimed at improving Navistar’s technology and procurement capabilities.

=== 2020s ===
On January 30, 2020, Traton announced a proposal to acquire all outstanding shares of Navistar. In April 2021, the Brazilian competition regulator CADE initiated a review of the pending merger, distributing market surveys to 35 companies. The acquisition was completed on July 1, 2021, making Navistar a subsidiary of the Traton Group. As part of the merger, Navistar International Corporation was renamed Navistar, Inc.

On July 15, 2020, Navistar entered into a partnership with TuSimple, a company specializing in autonomous trucking technology, to develop Level-4 autonomous semi-trucks. Production was scheduled to begin in 2024. While the total investment remained undisclosed, Navistar acquired a minority stake in TuSimple as part of the agreement.

On September 25, 2024, Navistar announced its rebranding to International Motors, LLC, effective October 1, 2024. The company also introduced a new logo and corporate identity as part of the transition.

In April 2025, citing tariffs and a freight recession, International cut 900 jobs from its Escobedo plant. A further 300 corporate employees were laid off in February 2026. On March 30th, 2026, the company announced the sale of its Springfield, Ohio facilities to Roshel, a defense manufacturer based in Canada. After the expiration of International's production contract with General Motors on September 30th, 2026, Roshel will take over the facility. Approximately 1,341 employees will be terminated, and production of the CV model (and the related Chevy Silverado 4500-6500 models) will cease.

== Corporate operations ==
=== International Trucks (1986–present) ===

In 1986, after International Harvester transitioned to Navistar International, the Truck and Engine Division (essentially all that remained) continued the use of the International brand name. The third-largest Class 8 manufacturer (behind Freightliner and the combined brands of Paccar), International held a 12.6% market share for 2022.

The current International Truck product range ranges from medium-duty Class 4 to heavy-duty Class 8 payload ranges across a wide variety of applications.

==== Current products ====
| Vehicle name | Production | Classification | Configuration | Notes |
|---|---|---|---|---|
| International CV | 2018–2026 | Class 4–5 | Light/Medium duty straight truck | Replaced International TerraStar. Lightest-duty product line, produced by International alongside Chevrolet Silverado 4500-6500 HD. |
| International MV | 2018–present | Class 6–7 | Medium duty straight truck | Replaced International Durastar. Revision for 2022 production. |
| International RH | 2017–present | Class 8 | Regional-haul semitractor | Replaced International TranStar. Shares body with LT (without aerodynamic enhancements). |
| International LT | 2016–present | Class 8 | Over-the-road semitractor | Replaced International ProStar. First International truck of two-letter nomenclature and second-generation NGV cab. |
| International HV | 2018–present | Class 7–9 | Severe-service straight truck | Replaced International WorkStar. |
| International HX | 2016–present | Class 8–9 | Severe-service straight truck/semitractor | Replaced International Paystar. Largest product line, produced as both straight truck and semitractor configurations. |

==== Former products ====
| Vehicle name | Production | Classification | Configuration | Notes |
|---|---|---|---|---|
| International LoneStar | 2008–2023 | Class 8 | Over-the-road semitractor | Replaced International 9000i as flagship product line. Longest-hood semitractor, mating NGV cab with vintage-style hood design. 2018 revision introduced modernized cab of LT. Discontinued in 2023. |
| International Paystar | 1972–1986 International Harvester 1986–2016 International Trucks Navistar | Class 8 | Severe-service straight truck/semitractor | Redesigned into the International HX. Survived the corporate transition from International Harvester to Navistar and went on to be produced for 30 more years after the transition. |

=== IC Bus (2002–present) ===
International has a long history in the school bus industry as a chassis provider, dating to when school buses first became motorized. In 1991, parent company Navistar expanded its presence in the segment as it acquired a stake in school bus body manufacturer AmTran, completing its purchase in 1995. Since 2002, IC Bus operates as the bus-manufacturing subsidiary of Navistar; though specializing in yellow school buses, the company also produces vehicles for commercial use.

The IC Bus name stands for Integrated Coach, denoting how vehicles are designed and assembled nearly completely under a single corporate structure. The entire IC product line is derived from medium-duty International vehicles, using a body design designed within the company.

| Vehicle name | Production | Applications | Notes |
|---|---|---|---|
| IC CE-Series | 2000–present (2001–present model years) | School bus Commercial-use bus | Uses International MV chassis |
| IC RE-Series | 1995–2023 (1996–2024 model years) | School bus Commercial-use bus | Uses rear-engine International 3000 chassis (Final variant of International S-Series remaining in production) |
| IC TC-Series | 2018–present (2019–present model years) | Commercial-use bus | International 3300 chassis produced in a cutaway-cab configuration Produced by IC Bus for bodywork by second-party manufacturers |

=== MWM International Motores (2005–2022) ===
In 2005, Navistar purchased MWM International Motores, a Brazilian engine manufacturer formerly associated with Deutz AG. MWM was sold to Tupy S.A. in 2022.

=== Engines (1986–present) ===
In 1986, Navistar was formed from the engine division of the former International Harvester (alongside the truck division). In a continuation from its predecessor, International produced both gasoline and diesel-fueled engines for its medium-duty trucks and some heavy-duty trucks, offering second-party engines as an option. Class 8 trucks offered second-party diesel engines (from Caterpillar, Cummins, and Detroit Diesel). From International Harvester, International inherited production of the SV-series gasoline V8, IDI diesel V8, DV-series diesel V8, and DT466 inline-6. After 1986, the production of gasoline engines ended, shifting to diesel-powered engines entirely. During the 1980s, Navistar began an expansion of its engine families. For 1986, a 7.3L version of the IDI was introduced; the engine supplanted the long-running DV-series V8 by the end of 1988; the same year, it became an option in Ford trucks. For 1987, the DT inline-6 engine family was expanded to a second engine, as the DT360 was introduced (competing directly against the Cummins 6BT).

During 1994 production, the IDI V8 was replaced by the direct-injection T444E V8, sharing little more than its displacement with its predecessor; the T444E became the first Ford PowerStroke engine. While the DT360 was withdrawn (largely replaced by the T444E), the DT466 (now the DT466E) was joined by the larger DT530E (competing primarily against the Cummins C8.3). For the 2000s, International began developing engines to comply with updated emissions standards for commercial vehicles. During 2003, the T444E was discontinued and replaced the VT engine family, introduced by the VT365 V8. For 2004, the DT engines received modernized fuel injection and a redesigned turbocharger; the DT530 was replaced by the DT570 (sized between the Caterpillar C9 and the Cummins ISL). In place of using Selective Catalytic Reduction (SCR) to treat engine emissions, International adopted Exhaust Gas Recirculation (EGR), a configuration used with success in automobiles with gasoline engines.

For 2007 emissions compliance, International launched the "MaxxForce" branding for its diesel engines. The VT engine family consisted of the 4.5-liter MaxxForce 5 V6 and the 6.4-liter MaxxForce 7 V8 (replacing the VT365). The DT466 became the MaxxForceDT, with the DT and HT570 becoming the MaxxForce 9 and 10, respectively. For its Class 8 trucks, the company introduced "large-bore" engines for the first time, introducing the 10.5L MaxxForce 11 and the 12.4L MaxxForce 13. After the 2010 model year, Ford ended its engine supply agreement with International, continuing the PowerStroke range under its own designs. The MaxxForce 7 and DT engines were updated with twin turbochargers to improve emissions compliance.

Following several years of difficulty reliably matching 2007 and 2010 emissions compliance, International chose to end diesel engine production of their medium duty and 15L engines following the 2014 model year, replacing the MaxxForce 7 and MaxxForceDT with the Cummins ISB6.7 and ISL9, and ISX15, respectively.

In 2015, International launched the N13 to replace the MaxxForce 13, bringing selective catalytic reduction (SCR) technology to replace the previous emission control strategies.

In 2017, International launched the A26 12.4L inline-6. This was the next iteration of Navistar's 13L going to a single variable geometry turbo in place of the previous dual turbo setup and a smaller exhaust gas recirculation system.

In 2022, Navistar introduced the International S13 engine. Unlike the A26, the S13 engine operates on low revolutions and higher torque equating to fewer fuel injections and less fuel consumption.

=== Plug-in electric vehicles ===
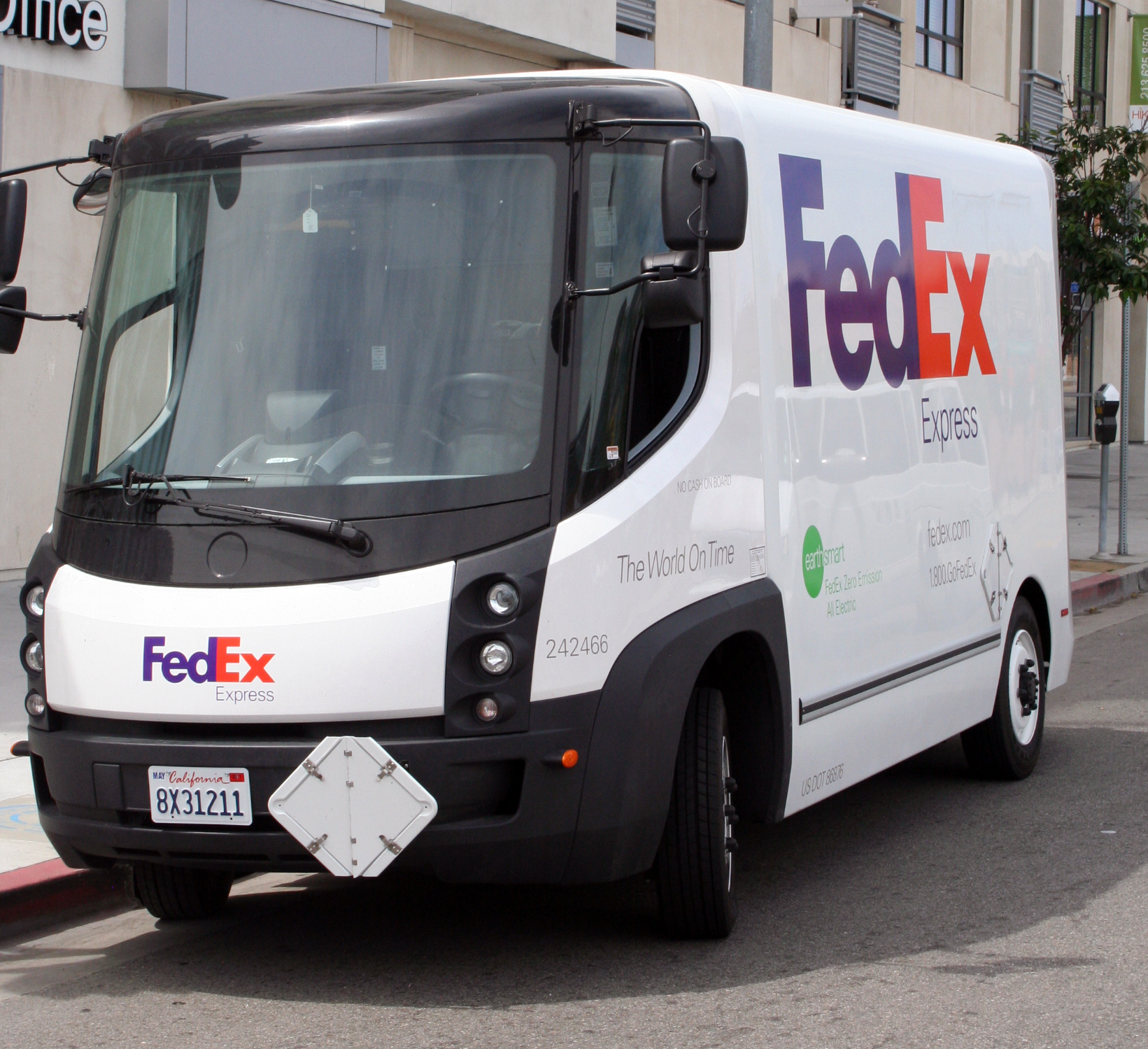
eStar electric van in Los Angeles in 2010. The vehicle was manufactured in the U.S. under license from Modec.

==== Plug-in hybrid electric bus ====
The U.S. Department of Energy announced in 2009 the selection of Navistar Corporation for a cost-shared award of up to US$10 million to develop, test, and deploy plug-in hybrid electric vehicle (PHEV) school buses. The project aims to deploy 60 vehicles for a three-year period in school bus fleets across the nation. The vehicles will be capable of running in either electric-only or hybrid modes that can be recharged from standard electrical outlets. Because electricity will be their primary fuel, they will consume less petroleum than standard vehicles. To develop the PHEV school bus, Navistar will examine a range of hybrid architectures and evaluate advanced energy storage devices, with the goal of developing a vehicle with a 40-mile (64 km) range. Travel beyond the range will be facilitated by a clean diesel engine capable of running on renewable fuels. The DOE funding will cover up to half of the project's cost and will be provided over three years, subject to annual appropriations.

==== eStar electric van ====
The eStar was an all-electric van. Production began in March 2010 and first deliveries began two months later via its Workhorse Group division. The technology used in eStar was licensed to Navistar in 2009 in a joint venture with Modec and Navistar bought the intellectual property rights from the Modec's bankruptcy administrators in 2011. The introduction of the eStar was supported by a US$39.2 million U.S. Department of Energy stimulus grant under the 2009 American Recovery and Reinvestment Act. The eStar had a 5,100 lb (2,300 kg) payload capacity available with a 14- or 16-foot cargo box. The vehicle was powered by a 70 kW 102 hp electric motor powered by an 80kWhr lithium-ion battery pack supplied by A123 Systems, and also used regenerative braking. The electric van had a range of 100 mi (160 km), and a full charge took between 6 and 8 hours. By May 2010 the eStar had received U.S. Environmental Protection Agency (EPA) and CARB certifications. The eStar also met all Federal Motor Vehicle Safety Standards (FMVSS). The first vans were delivered in May 2010 to FedEx Express for use in Los Angeles. Other customers included Pacific Gas and Electric Company (PG&E), The Coca-Cola Company, and Canada Post. The eStar had a price of US$150,000. Navistar discontinued the eStar van in March 2013, as part of a corporate restructuring plan to focus on current profitability.

=== Navistar Defense LLC (2003–present) ===
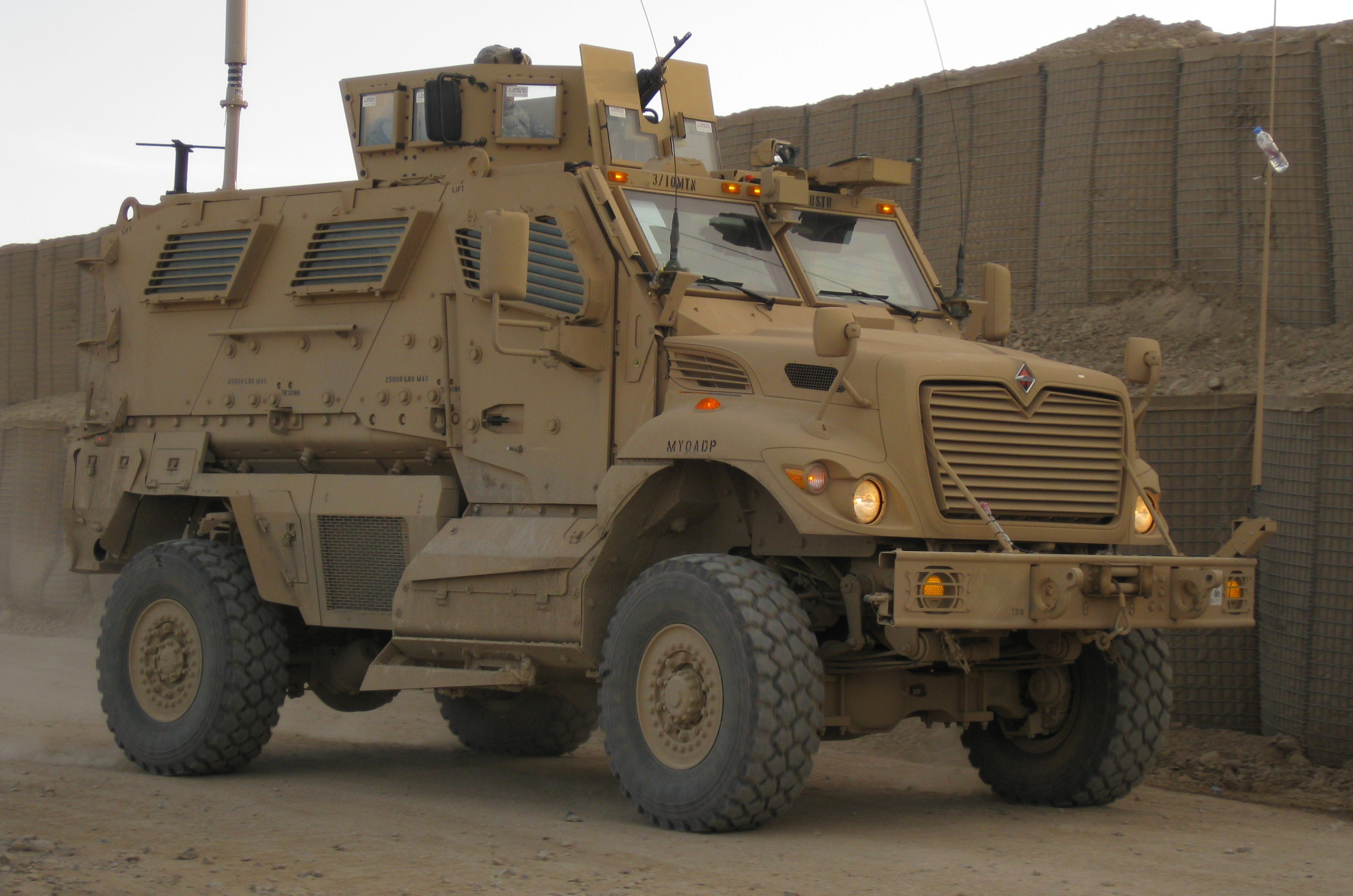
International MaxxPro MRAP

In 2003, Navistar created Navistar Defense. While Navistar had manufactured vehicles for the military long into its existence as International Harvester, Navistar Defense would operate as a freestanding division within the company. Alongside the MaxxPro MRAP and the MXT-MV, Navistar Defense has developed military variants of the 5000 and 7000 severe-service trucks (today, the HX and HV-Series on-road).

== Leadership ==
- Neil Springer (1986–1987)
- James C. Cotting (1987–1991)
- John R. Horne (1991–2003)
- Daniel Ustian (2003–2012)
- Lewis B. Campbell (2012–2013)
- Jack Allen (2013)
- Troy A. Clarke (2013–2020)
- Persio Lisboa (2020–2021)
- Mathias Carlbaum (2021–present)

== Joint ventures ==
=== Current ===
==== General Motors ====
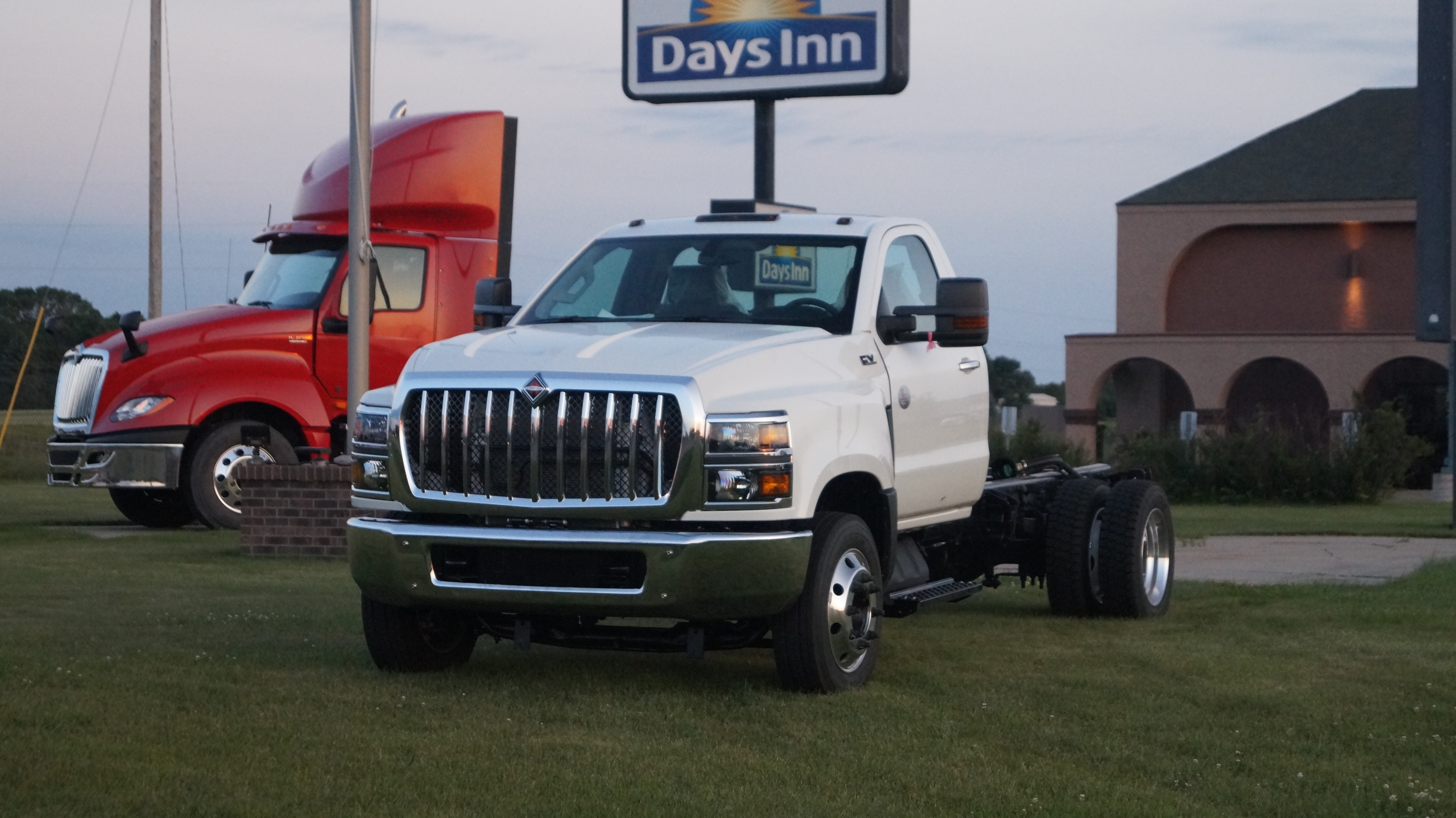
2019–2020 International CV chassis cab

Navistar entered into an agreement to purchase General Motors' medium duty truck unit in 2007, but because of changing market conditions the purchase ultimately did not occur, and production of the Chevrolet Kodiak and GMC TopKick were discontinued in 2009 as GM entered bankruptcy protection. In 2015, a joint venture between the two companies for development of a new Class 4/5 commercial vehicle was announced. In early 2017, Navistar's truck assembly plant in Springfield, Ohio, began production of cutaway van chassis variants of the GMT610 Chevrolet Express and GMC Savana. Further details around the Chevy Silverado 4500HD/5500HD/6500HD were announced by General Motors early in 2018, with Navistar also unveiling the International-branded variant of the truck, the CV series, shortly thereafter. Production started in late 2018. The truck serves as a successor to the previously discontinued Chevrolet Kodiak and International TerraStar, competing against the Ford Super Duty F-450/F-550/F-600 and Ram Chassis Cab.

=== Former ===
==== Ford Motor Company ====
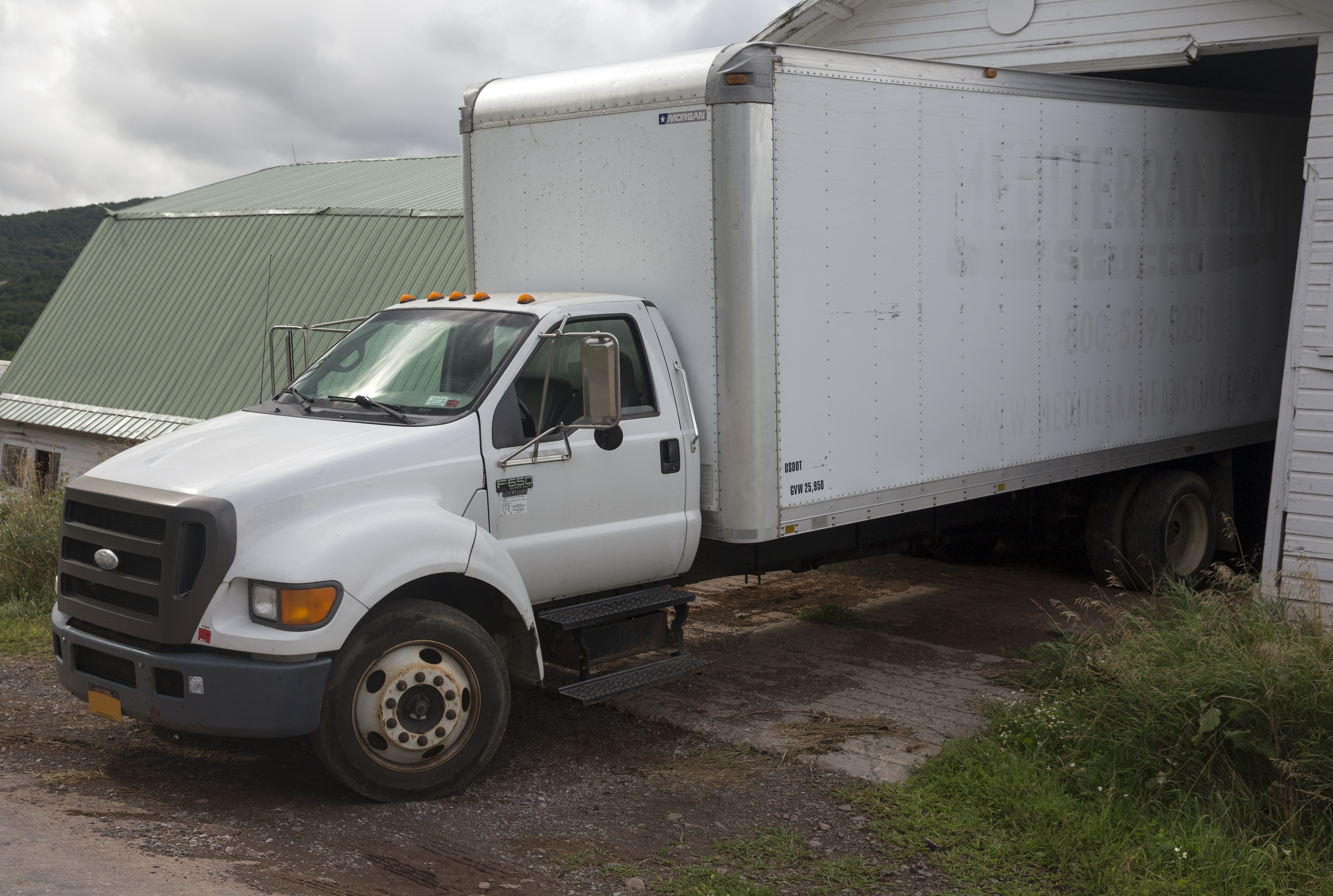
2007 Ford F-650, a product of Blue Diamond Truck

From the 1980s to the 2010s, Navistar had a close relationship with Ford Motor Company. Commencing for the 1983 model year as an engine-supply agreement, the relationship evolved into a $400 million yearly business, culminating into joint production of entire vehicle lines. Following the end of the diesel-engine supply agreement after the 2010 model year, Ford and Navistar ended collaborative production of medium-duty commercial trucks after the 2014 model year

In the mid-2000s, Ford supplied pickup bodies for the International XT line.

===== Ford diesel V8 engine =====
As a result of the gas crises of the 1970s, the implementation of Corporate Average Fuel Economy (CAFE), was applied to light trucks alongside automobiles. In response, large-block gasoline V8 engines (such as the Ford 460) were withdrawn from production from pickup trucks and full-size vans. For the 1983 model year, Ford entered into a supply agreement with International Harvester to use the newly introduced IDI diesel V8 for 3/4 and 1-ton F-Series pickups and E-Series vans. While roughly matching the output of the discontinued 400 cubic-inch V8 (the engine that it replaced alongside a reintroduced 460), the 6.9L diesel offered fuel economy closer to the standard 4.9L inline-6. While originally developed for the International S1700 medium-duty truck, the engine supply agreement brought a diesel engine to market faster (and at far lower cost) than developing an engine from the ground up. In 1988, as International phased out the 6.9L engine, Ford received the 7.3L IDI diesel. During 1994 production, the IDI was replaced by the all-new T444E; to emphasize the introduction of direct injection fuel delivery, Ford began to brand International-sourced engines under the "PowerStroke" branding. As with the IDI, the T444E/PowerStroke was used in F-Series/E-Series trucks and vans. During 2003 production, the Ford Super Duty line and the E-Series adopted the VT365, replacing the T444E. For 2008, the MaxxForce 7 was introduced for the Super Duty pickups as a PowerStroke engine; in place of a variable-geometry turbocharger (used by International trucks), Ford versions of the engine were fitted with compound turbochargers. As the 6.4L engine would not properly fit in the vehicle, the E-Series continued use of the 6.0L diesel. After the 2010 model year, Ford ended the use of International-supplied diesel engines. From 2011 onward, the Super Duty was fitted with diesel engines developed by Ford; the E-Series shifted production exclusively to gasoline-based engines. Today, Ford continues the use of the PowerStroke branding, using it for multiple diesel engines produced by the company.

===== Blue Diamond Truck =====
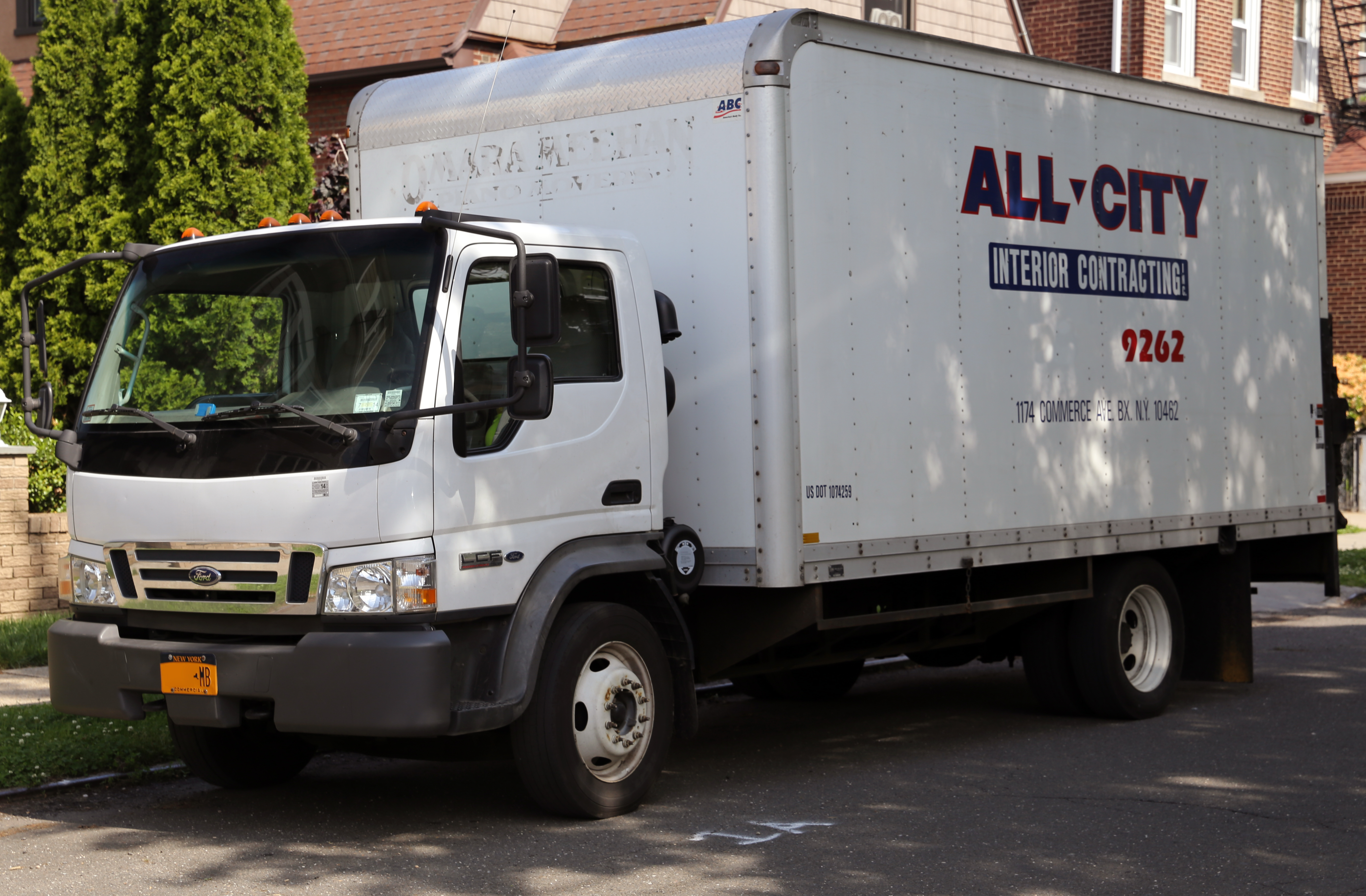
2006 Ford LCF (low-cab forward); built by Blue Diamond Truck (also sold as the International CF/CityStar)

In September 2001, Navistar announced a joint venture with Ford, named Blue Diamond Truck Co. LLC. A 50/50 agreement between the two companies, Blue Diamond was intended to develop and manufacture vehicles and powertrains for both companies using the International facility in General Escobedo, Mexico. In 2004, Blue Diamond Truck launched production. While sharing a common frame, the Ford F-650 and F-750 Super Duty were produced with different bodywork and powertrains than the International 4200/4300. In 2006, Blue Diamond released the Ford LCF/International CF, the first model line developed under the joint venture. To create the low-cab COE, the frame (sourced from the Ford F-450/F-550 Super Duty) was mated with the cab of the Mazda Titan (converted to left-hand drive). The LCF received the first engine developed by Blue Diamond Truck, a 4.5-liter V6 (a six-cylinder version of the 6-liter V8). In 2015, the Blue Diamond Truck venture was dissolved by Ford. International retained production at General Escobedo, with Ford shifting medium-duty truck production to its facility in Avon Lake, Ohio.

==== Anhui Jianghuai Navistar ====
On 16 September 2010, Anhui Jianghuai Automobile Co., Ltd. (JAC) announced joint ventures with NC2 Global and Navistar International Corporation that will develop, build, and market heavy duty trucks and diesel engines in China. In May 2018, it was announced that Cummins would be buying out Navistar's equity in the venture.

==== Mahindra Navistar ====
Navistar formed a joint venture with Mahindra & Mahindra to build heavy trucks in India under the "Mahindra International" brand, which has since been renamed Mahindra Navistar. These trucks were displayed at Auto Expo 2010 in Delhi, India. The joint venture ceased as Navistar exited the joint venture in 2013.

==== DINA/DIMEX Navistar ====
DINA (Diesel Nacional, S.A. de C.V, in English: National Diesel) or DIMEX (Diesel Mexicano, S.A. de C.V, in English: Mexican Diesel) for International Version is a Mexican bus and truck manufacturer based in Ciudad Sahagún, Hidalgo, Mexico. It was created by the federal government of Mexico in 1951 as Diesel Nacional, S.A..[1], and is currently owned by Grupo Empresarial G and its subsidiaries (since 1989). The company has gone through several stages of production of freight and bus models throughout its history, thanks to technological and commercial agreements and partnerships with various companies such as Fiat, Renault, Marcopolo S.A., Flxible, Cummins, Perkins, Chrysler, Caterpillar, Scania, MCI, Škoda, Spicer, Eaton and Dana. Today its primary production is buses for urban domestic and foreign use. They have developed their truck technology with a subsidiary of BMW. Currently, nearly 20% of the national vehicle fleet operate in Mexico, along with other Latin American countries. In 2001, to avoid bankruptcy, a group of administrative staff of Grupo Empresarial G, owners of the company remnants, carried out the financial restructuring of DINA Camiones. This process consisted of the sale of the plants that the group owned. In 2002, the government of the state of Hidalgo bought the facilities of the DINA Camiones plant. In 2005, a group of Argentine businessmen bought the Argentine DINA plant. Subsequently, problems arising due to the cancellation of the contract with Western Star Trucks, was settled by legal means. Freightliner paid a large compensation to the Mexican company. In compliance with the agreement, the amount was not disclosed. In 2004, the process of designing new passenger units began, based on HTQ technology, as well as on national and international standards. Starting in 2007, the first five prototypes of the chassis were concluded. The design and construction of a new plant began, along with the necessary equipment and tools. This was in the same industrial zone of Ciudad Sahagún, state of Hidalgo, Mexico. In July 2007, a prototype departed the new DINA plant. Its purpose was to conduct road tests, prior to production and marketing. In May 2008, the restart of DINA Camiones was announced, with the production and sales of four new bus models, all of them the urban type: DINA Linner, Runner, Picker and Outsider. At the time of restarting operations that year, the investment was US$100 million. The plant had a capacity of 23 units per day, 450 direct and 750 indirect jobs, and five concessionaires in different Mexican states to sell their units in Mexico.

== Controversies ==
In December 2011, the nonpartisan organization Public Campaign criticized Navistar International for spending $6.31 million on lobbying and not paying any taxes during 2008–2010, instead getting $18 million in tax rebates, despite making a profit of $896 million and increasing executive pay by 81%. On January 31, 2005, Navistar Financial said it would restate financial statements for fiscal years 2002 and 2003 and the first three quarters of fiscal 2004, because it did not take into consideration potential changes to future income. On April 7, 2006, Navistar restated financial results from 2002 through 2004, and for the first three quarters of 2005, due to accounting practices that are the subject of a continuing review.

=== Accounting issues ===
In January 2006, the company declared it would not file its form 10-K annual report with the U.S. Securities and Exchange Commission on time. The delay was caused by the disagreement with its auditors, Deloitte & Touche, over complex accounting issues. In April, Navistar fired Deloitte, its independent auditor for 98 years, and hired KPMG to help restate earnings back to 2002 to fix accounting errors. On December 15, 2006, Navistar executives announced a further delay in its restatement and 2006 results. The announcement prompted the New York Stock Exchange (NYSE) to announce the delisting of the company, after 98 years of trading, although the NYSE subsequently delayed the delisting pending an appeal by Navistar. However, Navistar was removed from the S&P 500 Index, and the NYSE eventually denied Navistar's appeal and delisted the stock; it traded on the Pink Sheets until 30 June 2008, when it was relisted on the NYSE, under its previous ticker symbol, NAV, after catching up with its filings. Christopher Anderson, the Deloitte partner responsible for the 2003 audit, accepted a one-year suspension from public audits in 2008, and became the first individual to be fined by the Public Company Accounting Oversight Board.

CEO Daniel Ustian agreed to surrender to Navistar shares worth $1.3 million, while former Chief Financial Officer Robert C. Lannert consented to repay $1.05 million, each sum reflecting monetary bonuses they had received during the restatement period, the SEC said. Four other company executives paid civil penalties without admitting liability.

In December 2014, Navistar disclosed more accounting problems. These involved out-of-period adjustments, which were corrections of prior period errors relating to product warranties. This resulted in a $36 million increase in Cost of Products Sold. In addition, a material weakness was disclosed. In the company's annual 10K, they reported that weakness was "surrounding validation of the completeness and accuracy of underlying data used in the determination of significant accounting estimates and accounting transactions. Specifically, controls were not designed to identify errors in the underlying data which was used to calculate warranty cost estimates and other significant accounting estimates and the accounting effects of significant transactions.

=== Failed engine strategy ===
In 2001, the company under then CEO Dan Ustian faced numerous United States Environmental Protection Agency (EPA) regulations to reduce the amount of nitrogen oxides and soot emanating from diesel engines. Despite the change in the compliance arena, the regulations would not begin to be phased in until 2007, with full implementation slated for 2010.

Ustian had multiple engineering paths available. Among them were Selective Catalytic Reduction (SCR), Exhaust Gas Recirculation (EGR), or the use of nitrogen oxide absorbers. All required more engineering and development to achieve compliance. Ustian believed truckers did not want to bother with an extra tank of fluid after treatment. As a result, he convinced the company to spend $700 million to fund EGR development.

On October 31, 2007, Navistar formally announced their intent to move forward with EGR as the company's strategy. The company statement included Ustian mentioning "I have publicly been an advocate of customer friendly emissions control solutions which do not add additional costs to our truck and bus customers. While SCR is a means to achieve the NOx reduction requirement for 2010, it comes with a steep cost to our customers. Our ability to achieve our goals without adding customer cost and inconvenience is a competitive advantage for International."

On November 24, 2008, Navistar revealed it would use EPA Credits in order to comply with the 2010 legislation.

In February 2009, Ustian touted the benefits of EGR technology as a key differentiator for the company's engines. However, by now, the rest of the industry had chosen to use compliant SCR technology. Ustian disagreed with SCR, saying "the other thing that EGR avoids is the risks of an SCR strategy. Read the label on this and it will show you that there are challenges with keeping control of using this technology: 'Store between 23 degrees and 68 degrees.' So essentially it says you can't throw it outside. You can't operate it in conditions above 85 [degrees] or below 12 [degrees]. You can, but, it will put the burden onto the customers."

==== Non-conformance penalties ====
The EPA recognized Navistar's imminent non-compliance and created a system of Non-Conformance Penalties (NCPs) that included a $1,919 fine for every non-compliant engine that Navistar sold. To bridge the gap, Navistar began using EPA credits it had previously earned for being compliant in lieu of paying fines. In August 2012, Navistar stated they would run out of EPA credits soon. Only days earlier the EPA announced increased new penalties of $3,744 per engine.

In March 2009, Navistar sued the EPA, claiming that the agency's guidance documents for SCR implementation were invalid because they were adopted without a public process and with input only from the SCR engine makers. Navistar and the EPA settled the lawsuit a year later.

Further masking the EGR problem were high military sales. In the company's 2010 10K report, Navistar cited orders for MRAPs as offsetting flat commercial sales due to the recession.

In January 2012, the EPA adopted an interim final rule that allowed Navistar to continue selling the engines subject to NCPs. Several Navistar competitors sued, and in June 2012 the same appeals court ruled that EPA's interim rule was invalid because it did not give the public notice and an opportunity for comment.

In the meantime, Navistar's EGR decision had led to significant reliability issues and quality problems (which were ultimately traceable to the fundamental physical reality that recirculation of exhaust gas introduces intrinsically abrasive soot and inherently corrosive acid gases back into the engine). Truck drivers began losing trust and confidence as Navistar vehicles were breaking down frequently. Consequently, they abandoned Navistar trucks in favor of competitors' trucks.

==== Legal issues (MaxxForce engines) ====
In December 2014, the United States Judicial Panel on Multidistrict Litigation ordered that 13 of 14 civil lawsuits brought against Navistar for MaxxForce engines would be consolidated into one case. The consolidated lawsuits say Navistar's use of Advanced Exhaust Gas Recirculation emission control system, or EGR, was defective and resulted in repeated engine failures and frequent repairs and downtime.

On December 16, 2014, Navistar reported a larger than expected fourth quarter net loss of $72 million. While sales rose 9 percent to $3 billion, the company cited restructuring and warranty costs as the main reasons for the loss. A day earlier, the company announced it would be closing its engine foundry in Indianapolis, resulting in the loss of 100 jobs and costing $11 million. The company estimated annual savings of $13 million in operating costs.

In March 2015, Navistar reported a first-quarter 2015 net loss of $42 million, or $0.52 per diluted share, compared to a first-quarter 2014 net loss of $248 million, or $3.05 per diluted share. Revenues in the quarter were $2.4 billion, up to $213 million or 10 percent, versus the first quarter of 2014. The higher revenues in the quarter were driven by a 17 percent year-over-year increase in charge outs for Class 6-8 trucks and buses in the United States and Canada. This included a 42 percent increase in school buses; a 25 percent increase in Class 6/7 medium trucks; a 7 percent increase in Class 8 heavy trucks; and a 5 percent increase in Class 8 severe service trucks. Higher sales in the company's export truck operations also contributed to the increase, partially offset by a decrease in used truck sales. The company finished the first quarter with a 27 percent year-over-year increase in order backlog for Class 6-8 trucks.

On June 4, 2015, Navistar reported a second-quarter net loss of $64 million, or 78 cents a share, compared with a year-earlier loss of $297 million, or $3.65 a share. Revenue fell to $2.69 billion from $2.75 billion. Analysts had expected a loss of 18 cents a share and revenue of $2.82 billion.

On June 9, 2015, Navistar named Jeff Sass as the new Senior VP of North American Truck Sales. Sass previously worked 20 years for rival Paccar.

On June 12, 2015, Mark Rachesky's MHR Fund Management LLC disclosed a 6% increased stake in Navistar, up to 15,446,562 shares. The firm now owns 18.9% of Navistar.

In July 2015, the EPA filed a civil lawsuit against Navistar seeking $300 million in fines over its use of non-compliant engines in its 2010-model trucks – engines that did not meet the agency's exhaust emission standards. "Because (Navistar) completed manufacturing and assembling processes for the subject engines in 2010 … each and every engine was 'produced' in 2010 and is therefore not a model 2009 engine," the complaint said. Navistar classified the engines as 2009 model year engines because it began assembling them in 2009. Navistar has stated they dispute the allegations and would "aggressively defend" their position.

On July 20, 2015, Navistar announced that it was refinancing the $697.5 million senior secured term loan facility of Navistar, Inc., which matures in August 2017, with a new $1.040 billion senior secured term loan, which will mature in August 2020. The refinancing will extend the maturity of the term loan facility and provide additional liquidity and financial flexibility for the company.

In March 2016, the Securities and Exchange Commission charged Navistar with misleading investors about its development of the advanced technology truck engine.

In August 2017, a Tennessee jury found that Navistar committed fraud and violated the Tennessee Consumer Practice Act in connection with the sale of 243 Navistar International ProStars with MaxxForce engines to Milan Supply Chain Solutions. It awarded $10.8 million in actual damages and $20 million in punitive damages. The trial included testimony from Jim Hebe, who previously was the senior vice president, North America Sales Operations. Hebe retired in October 2012. Hebe's testimony about the engine program mentioned that the company "did not test s**t". In a statement, Navistar said it is disappointed in the jury's verdict and is evaluating its options to challenge it, noting it has successfully defended similar claims in several jurisdictions, including dismissal of claims of fraud in courts in Texas, Wisconsin, Michigan, Indiana, Alabama, and Illinois.

== Facilities ==
=== Corporate facilities ===
| Name | City/state | Country | Year opened | Employees | Use | Comments |
|---|---|---|---|---|---|---|
| International World Headquarters | Lisle, Illinois | U.S. | 2011 | 7,991 | International purchased the facility for $110 million in 2011 in an effort to consolidate their corporate headquarters as well as their Truck and Engine divisions. | Former Lucent Technologies Campus. |
| Navistar Proving Grounds | New Carlisle, Indiana | U.S. | 1926, acquired by Navistar in 2015. | | Navistar acquired the facility to replace their former proving grounds in Fort Wayne, Indiana. | Facility was opened in 1926 by Studebaker as the world's first-ever controlled automotive-testing grounds. Navistar acquired the facility from Bosch. |
| Navistar Advanced Technology Center | San Antonio, Texas | U.S. | 2021 | 650 | Facility used to test and validate components used in diesel and Electric trucks. | Facility was purchased to replace Navistar's former technical center in Melrose Park, Illinois. |

=== Manufacturing facilities ===
| Name | City/state | Country | Year Opened | Employees | Products | Comments |
|---|---|---|---|---|---|---|
| Springfield Assembly Plant | Springfield, Ohio | U.S. | 1961 | 1,450 | CV Series (also produced as Chevrolet Silverado C6500 HD), MV Series, HV Series, GM Vista Light Duty | Last former International Harvester facility still in use by Navistar. This facility is slated to be sold to Roshel after the expiration of the CV production contract. |
| Tulsa Bus Plant | Tulsa Oklahoma | U.S. | 1941, Leased by IC bus since 2001 | 918 | RE-Series, CE-Series, TC-Series | Facility originally opened as a Douglas Aircraft bomber assembly. IC currently shares the facility with Boeing. |
| Huntsville Powertrain Manufacturing Plant | Huntsville, Alabama | U.S. | 2008 | 217 | A26 engine, S13 integrated powertrain | |
| Escobedo Assembly Plant | Escobedo, Nuevo León | Mexico | 1998 | 6,200 | HX Series, LT Series, RH Series | Former Blue Diamond Truck (truck designs shared with Ford) from 2001 to 2015 |
| San Antonio Manufacturing Plant | San Antonio, Texas | U.S. | 2022 | 600 | HV Series, LT Series, RH Series | Assembly was the first opened by Navistar in decades. Designed so that both electric and conventional trucks can be assembled on the same line. |

=== Former facilities ===
| Name | City/state | Country | Year Opened | Year Closed | Products/Uses | Comments |
|---|---|---|---|---|---|---|
| Chatham Assembly Plant | Chatham, Ontario | Canada | 1948 | 2011 | LoneStar, ProStar | Facility replaced an older factory on Grand Avenue East that was built in 1922. |
| Melrose Park Engine Plant/Technical Center | Melrose Park, Illinois | U.S. | 1941, acquired by International Harvester in 1946 | 2018 engine plant, 2021 technical center | Engine engineering, DT engine | Facility was originally built as a Buick Aviation plant, following the Second World War International purchased the facility and used it as the headquarters for their engine group. The main facility was broken into two sections one being engine test cells and later truck component testing and the other being engine production. |
| Fort Wayne Truck Development Technology Center. | Fort Wayne, Indiana | U.S. | 1950 | 2012 | Truck engineering | Facility was the headquarters for International's truck division. located across the street from International Harvester's Fort Wayne assembly. The facility was closed after the opening of Navistar's World Headquarters in Lisle, Illinois. |
| Pure Power Technologies Waukesha Foundry | Waukesha, Wisconsin | U.S. | 1896, acquired by International Harvester in 1946 | Sold 2015, closed 2020 | ductile iron and high-temperature and abrasion-resistant ferrous alloy engine components. | Facility was acquired by International from the U.S. government which had been operating it as a defense plant. Navistar eventually reorganized its foundries under its Pure Power Technologies Division in 2012. In 2015 the facility was sold to the Grede foundry group in 2015 which operated it until its closure in 2020. |
| Indianapolis Engine Assembly and Foundry | Indianapolis, Indiana | U.S. | 1937 | 2009 assembly, 2015 foundry | Engine blocks, T444E engine, International IDI, VT engine | Plant was constructed by international in an effort to consolidate its engine production into one facility. By the 1980s the plant began producing engines for Ford trucks eventually under the Power Stroke brand. This partnership would continue until 2009 prompting the idling of the engine assembly. |
| Garland Truck Plant | Garland, Texas | U.S. | 1963, acquired by Navistar in 1997 | 2013 | LoneStar, TranStar, WorkStar, PayStar, MaxxPro | Plant was originally constructed by the Marmon Motor Company and was their primary assembly until 1997 when they were absorbed into Navistar. The closure was announced in an attempt to cut costs with the facility's production being relocated to assemblies in Springfield, Ohio; and Escobedo, Mexico |
| Conway Bus Plant | Conway, Arkansas | U.S. | 1933, acquired by Navistar in 1995 | 2010 | CE Series, FE Series, RE Series | Ceased school bus production and moved to Tulsa Bus Plant. |
| Columbus Plastics Operation | Columbus, Ohio | U.S. | 1981 | Sold 1996 | Plastic components, SMC parts (such as fenders, hoods and cowls) | Navistar sold the plant to Rymac Mortgage Investment Corp for $38 million in stocks citing a decrease in demand for plastic products. |
| Equitable Building | Chicago, Illinois | U.S. | 1965 | 1989 | Corporate Headquarters | International Harvester and later Navistar occupied eleven floors in the building. The tower was constructed on the former site of Cyrus McCormick's original reaper works that were destroyed in the Great Chicago Fire of 1871. International moved to the building from an older building also on Michigan Avenue stating that they intended to "return to their birthplace." |
| NBC Tower | Chicago, Illinois | U.S. | 1989 | 2000 | Corporate Headquarters | Navistar occupied several floors in the building from the tower's completion until 2000 when the decision was made to move to the suburbs to cut costs. |
| Navistar Corporate Headquarters | Warrenville, Illinois | U.S. | 2000 | 2011 | Corporate Headquarters | Six-story office building that Navistar leased. The office was closed in 2011 when Navistar decided to consolidate all corporate operations into one facility in nearby Lisle. |
| MWM Manufacturing Plant | São Paulo | Brazil | 1953 | Sold 2022 | Engine components. | MWM was sold to Tupy S.A. in 2022. |

== Images ==
International Motors vehicles
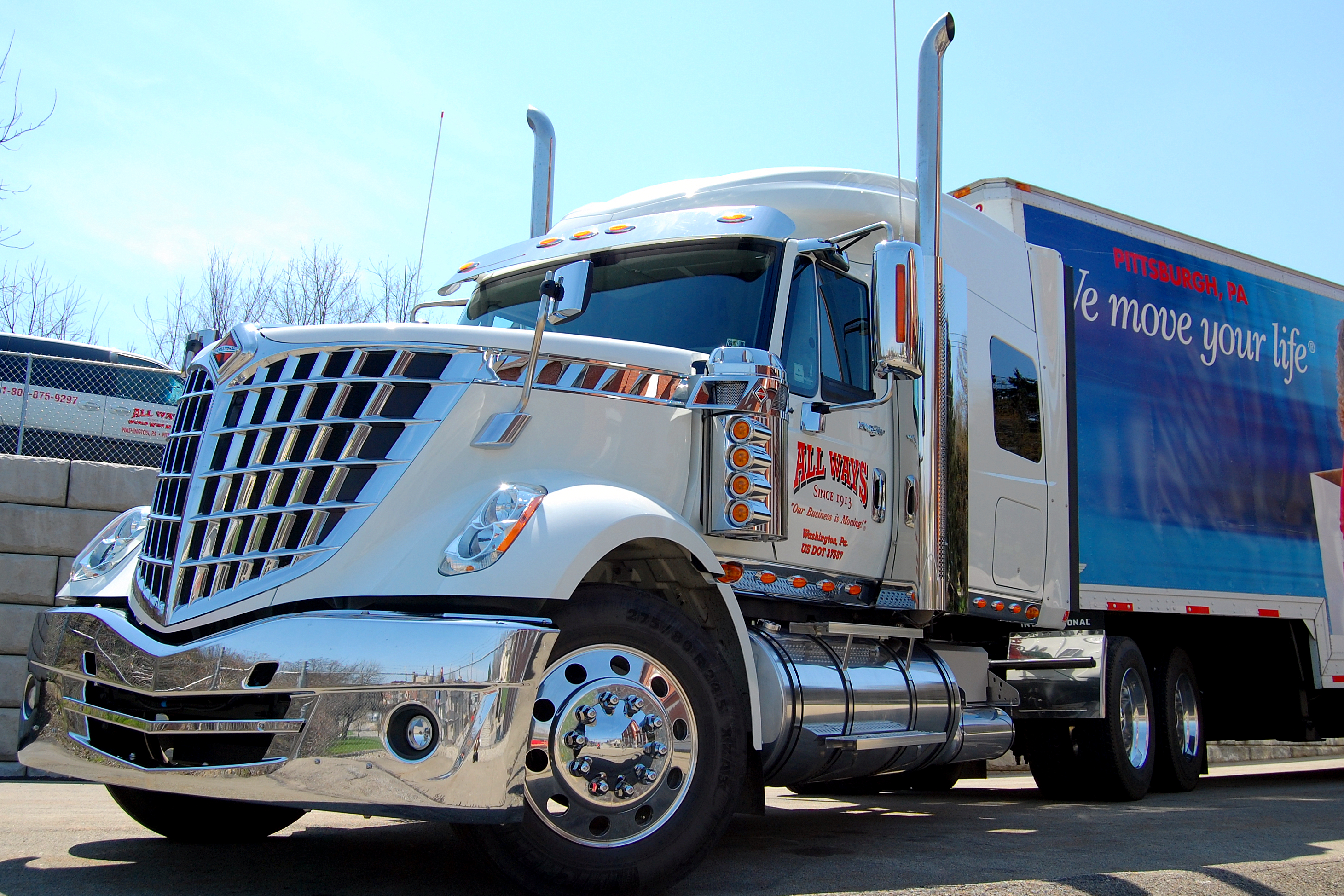
2010 International LoneStar tractor truck

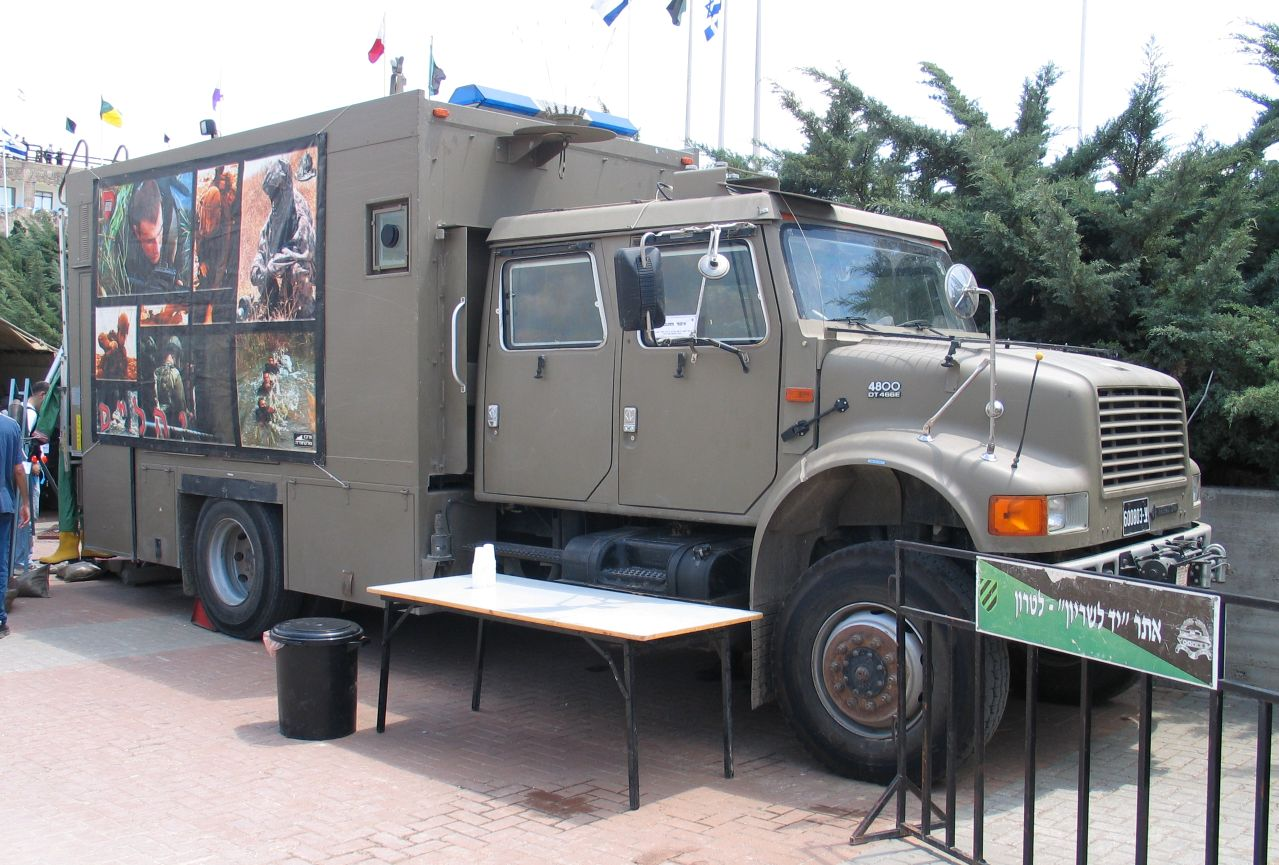
IDF Custom International

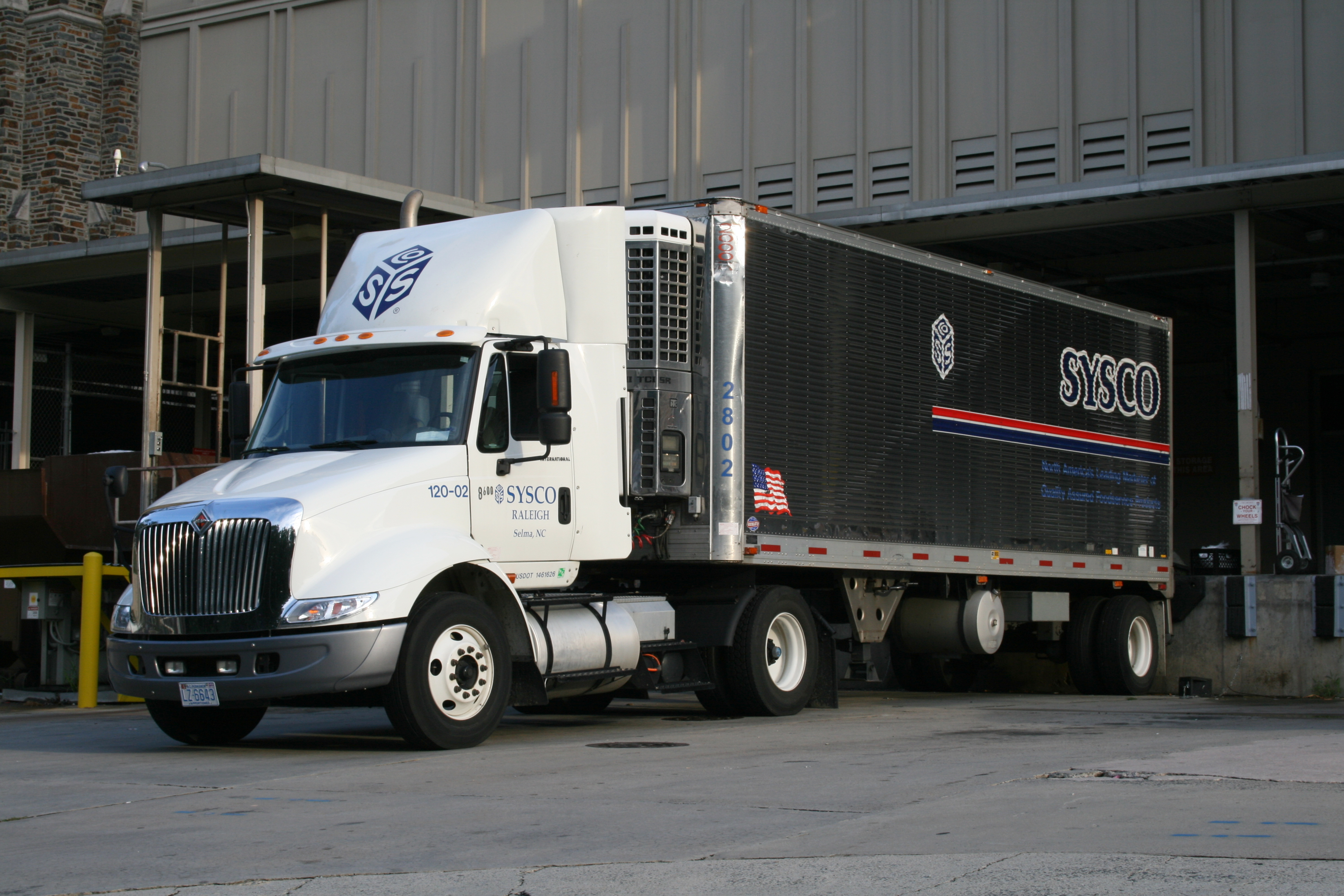
Navistar International truck operated by Sysco, docked at Duke Hospital South in Durham, North Carolina

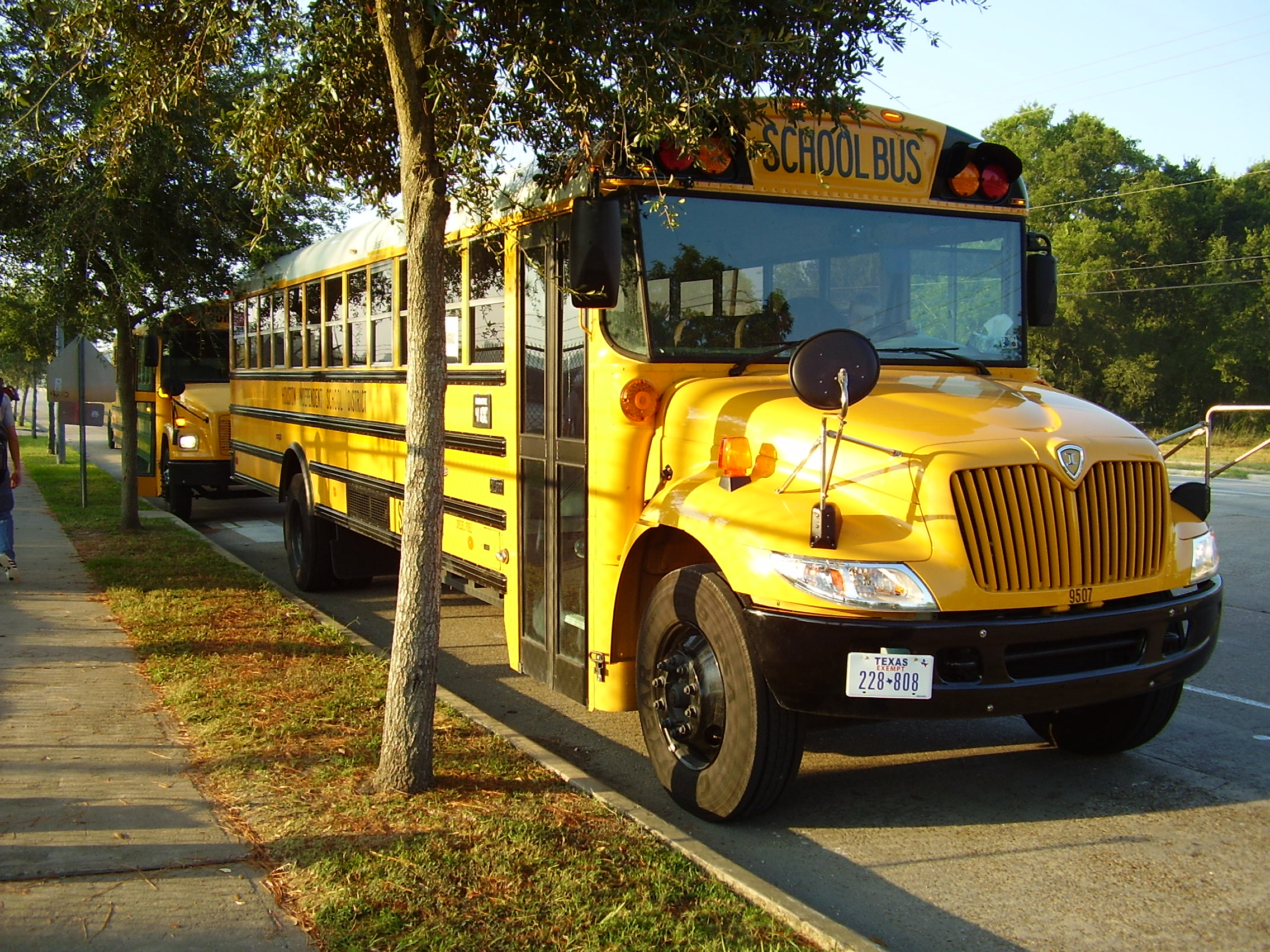
IC Bus CE300 school bus

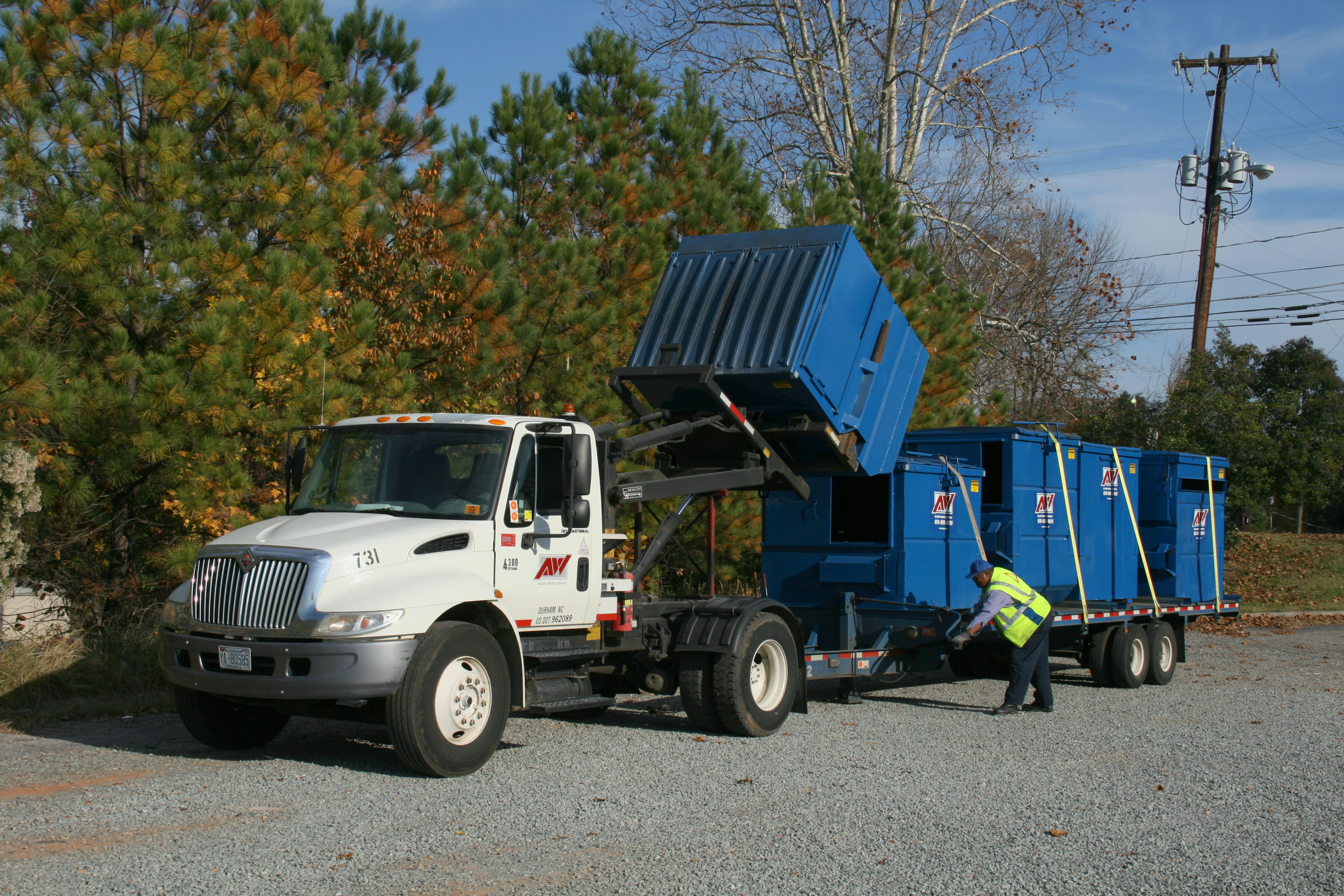
International DuraStar medium-duty truck

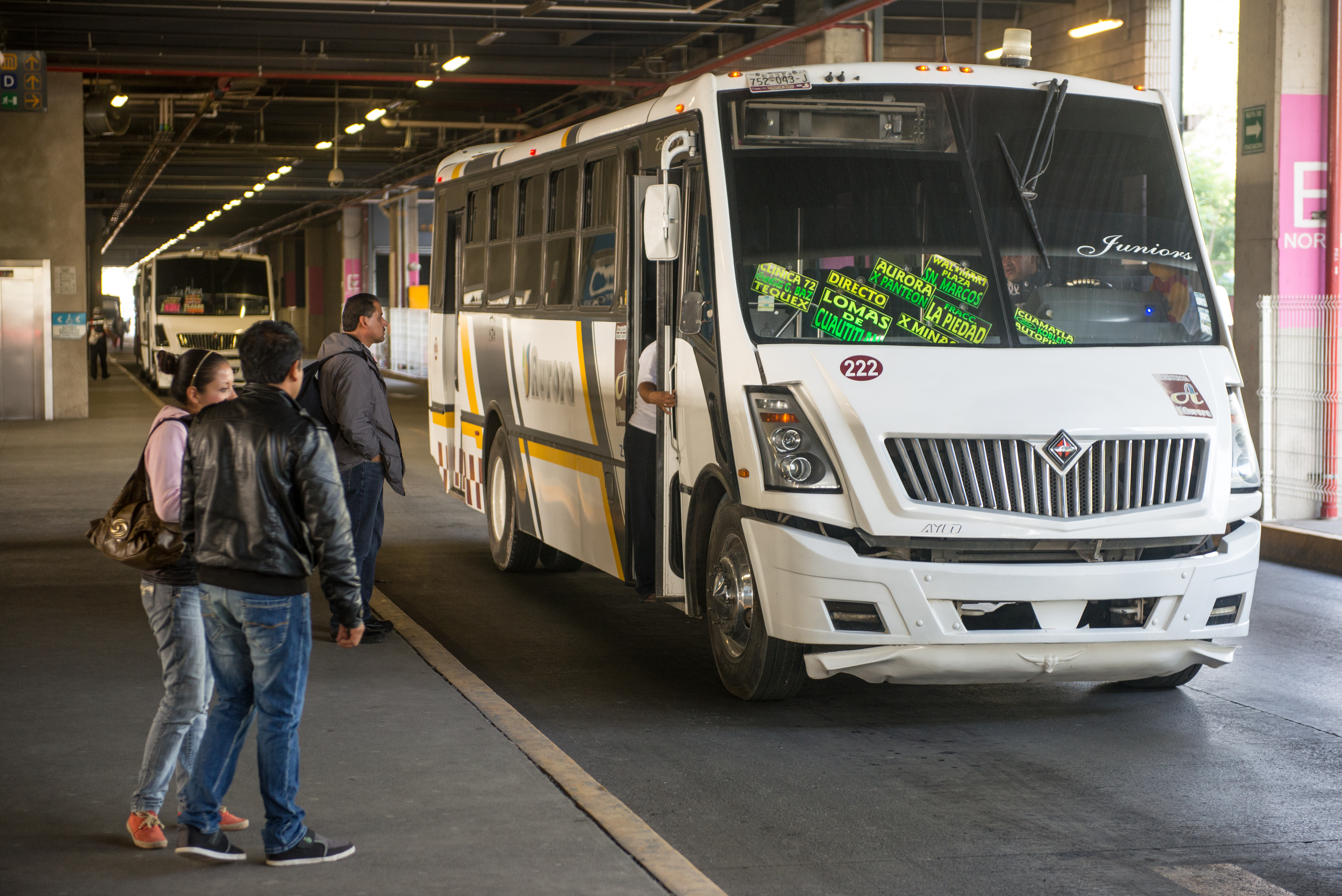
International 4700 SCD

== See also ==
- International Harvester
- List of International (brand) trucks
- List of International Harvester vehicles
- Odyne Corporation
- Traton Group
- Volkswagen Group
