= Lewis B. Campbell =

Lewis B. Campbell is the former interim CEO of Navistar International Corporation and the former CEO of Textron. He received a BSE from Duke University in 1968. After graduation, he began his career at the Inland Manufacturing Division of General Motors in Dayton, Ohio as a Product Engineer for Ice Cube Trays.

== Campbell’s Transformation of Textron ==
In 1998, Campbell was appointed chief executive officer. Campbell believed in the “core business” model, and divested from Avco Financial Services. With this complete, Campbell began the development of a new strategic framework for Textron aimed at creating new operational efficiencies and sharing best practices across the whole organization.

Beginning in 2000, Campbell engineered a transformation of the company that included a company-wide restructuring program to increase the efficiency of operations; the consolidation of several manufacturing facilities; outsourcing of non-core production; and careful attention to product development across the company to determine whether each was appropriate for the portfolio; divestiture of non-core units. This set Textron down a new path, focusing on operational excellence and management of strong portfolio brands.

The application of Six Sigma principles, not only to Textron's manufacturing operations, but also to the company's transactional processes and other enterprise-wide functions, provided a consistent approach to operational efficiency.

In the midst of some of the company's most difficult changes, shareholders watched Textron's stock price fall to a disappointing $26 in March 2003, then climb back to an all-time high in the first half of 2006 as the benefits of the transformation finally took hold.

Under the new model, Textron today functions as what it calls a “networked enterprise.” Departing from the old model of a holding company that simply acquires businesses and leaves their operations unchanged, the networked enterprise provides key points of contact to facilitate the operation of strong, unique brands. This means that while Bell Helicopter and E-Z-GO serve very different markets with distinct brands and customer bases, they share many of the same business infrastructure resources such as information technology infrastructure and employee benefits.

While CEO of Textron in 2008, Lewis B. Campbell earned a total compensation of $9,833,127, which included a base salary of $1,100,000, a cash bonus of $617,980, stocks granted of $5,314,507, and options granted of $2,149,798.

On December 1, 2009, Campbell retired as CEO of Textron as part of a multi-year succession plan. He was succeeded as CEO by Scott C. Donnelly. Donnelly was named chairman of the board on September 1, 2010.

== Career at Navistar International Corp. ==
After Daniel Ustian abruptly retired as Chairman and chief executive officer of Navistar International Corporation on August 27, 2012, Campbell was named interim Chief Executive Officer and Chairman of the truck and engine manufacturer.
