= Daniel Ustian =

American business executive

Daniel C. Ustian was the chairman of Navistar, Inc. beginning in 2004, president and chief executive officer beginning in 2003, and a director beginning in 2002 until his release in 2012. Before serving in these positions, he was president and chief operating officer from 2002 to 2003 and president of the Engine Group of Navistar, Inc. from 1999 to 2002. He also held the position of group vice president and general manager of Engine & Foundry from 1993 to 1999. An alum of DePaul University, he was a director of Monaco Coach Corporation and a member of the Business Roundtable, Society of Automotive Engineers and the American Foundry Society.

== Compensation ==
While CEO of Navistar International in 2008, Daniel Ustian earned a total compensation of $6,642,747, which included a base salary of $1,170,833, a cash bonus of $2,589,500, stocks granted of $2,775,216, and no options.

== Retirement ==
Daniel Ustian abruptly retired as president, executive chairman, and CEO of Navistar International on August 27, 2012. Lewis B. Campbell immediately stepped in to replace him as chairman and interim CEO. Ustian is largely blamed for convincing the company to spend hundreds of millions of dollars on the unproven and noncompliant exhaust gas recirculation (EGR) technology. EGR did not receive EPA certification, which led to governmental fines, high warranty costs, widespread retrofits, brand damage and loss of marketshare. Since Ustian's departure, the company has struggled to return to profitability. Navistar has also undergone two rounds of lay-offs -- one in August/September 2012 and another in August/September 2013.

On March 31, 2016, the Securities and Exchange Commission filed suit against Ustian in the U.S. District Court for Northern Illinois, citing a "campaign of deception" regarding the company's ultimately unsuccessful 2010 emissions compliance strategy. As of August 2018, the SEC suit against Ustian continued to move forward.

In February 2020, Ustian consented to a judgment without admitting or denying the SEC's allegations, agreeing to pay a penalty of $250,000 and a further $250,000 in disgorgement. The SEC then filed a motion to bar him from serving as an officer or director of a publicly traded company, to which he agreed. The court's entry of the bar order brought the SEC's litigation against Ustian to a complete conclusion.
