= Indianapolis Engine Plant and Foundry =

- Operated: 1937–2009
- Location: 5565 Brookville Road; Indianapolis, Indiana, United States
- Coordinates: 39°45′29″N 86°4′19″W
- Industry: Automotive
- Products: engines
- Employees: 1,100 (2005)
- Area: 90 acres (36 ha)
- Volume: 1,600,000 square feet (150,000 m^{2})
- Owner: Navistar International
- Defunct: 2009 (engine plant); 2015 (foundry)

Indianapolis Engine Plant and Foundry was an engine manufacturing and foundry plant in Indianapolis, Indiana owned by Navistar International.

== History ==
The plant was constructed by International Harvester in an effort to consolidate its engine production into one facility.

By the 1980s the plant began producing engines for Ford trucks eventually under the Power Stroke brand. This partnership would continue until 2009 prompting the idling of the engine assembly.

In 2005, the 1,100,000 square feet (100,000 m^{2}) engine plant employed 1,100 workers and produced 280,000 diesel engines annually after a $300 million upgrade, and the foundry employed 550 workers.

In January 2007, Ford Motor Company filed a lawsuit against Navistar, claiming the supplier unjustifiably increased engine prices and failed to pay its share of mounting warranty repair costs (which exceeded $1 billion) for the previous-generation 6.0-liter diesel engine. The next month, Navistar suspended production of its newly launched 6.4-liter Power Stroke diesel engine at the Indianapolis plant, along with its facility in Huntsville, Alabama.

In May 2008, the company temporarily idled its Indianapolis engine plant due to a sharp drop in demand for Ford heavy-duty trucks.

On January 27, 2009, Navistar announced that it would close its Indianapolis, Indiana, engine manufacturing plant along with its Indianapolis Casting Corporation foundry in the same area, and will lay off 700 workers at the plant. The engine plant shut down on July 31, 2009. However, the Indianapolis foundry remained open for another 5 years.

In December 2014, Navistar announced that it would shut down its Indianapolis, Indiana foundry by the summer of 2015, and will lay off 180 workers at the foundry. Navistar planned to buy engine blocks and heads from outside suppliers instead of casting them locally to reduce costs and improve manufacturing efficiency. The company expected to save about $13 million annually in operating costs.

== Products made ==
- International IDI
- T444E engine (1994–2003)
- VT engine (2003–2009)
