= NC2 Global =

Truck and engine manufacturer

- Industry: Automotive
- Founded: September 2009
- Headquarters: Chicago, Illinois,
- Area served: North America, India, South Africa, Australia
- Website: http://www.nc2.com/

NC2 Global is a heavy truck and engine manufacturer that was a 50/50 joint venture of Navistar International and Caterpillar Inc. based in Chicago, Illinois. It was formed in September 2009 to "develop, manufacture and distribute commercial trucks globally, outside North America and India". However, the JV was dissolved in 2011 and NC2 is now a wholly owned subsidiary of Navistar International. Vehicles distributed in Australia are branded CAT as part of the agreement.

In Brazil, NC2 has taken over the Navistar operations in Caxias do Sul.

== Products ==
NC2 Global is building heavy trucks under the International and Cat brands, making the first on-road Cat-branded trucks ever.

=== Caterpillar Australia ===
- Cat CT610 truck - 470 hp Cat C13 engine
- Cat CT630 truck - 550 hp Cat C15 engine

=== Caterpillar North America ===
- Cat CT660 truck - 330 hp to 390 hp (Cat CT11 powered models)
- Cat CT660 truck - 410 hp to 475 hp (Cat CT13 powered models)

=== International do Brasil ===
- International 9800e heavy-duty truck - Cummins ISX engine
- International 9800i heavy-duty truck - 417 hp Cummins ISX engine, 6x2 and 6x4
- International DuraStar medium-duty truck - 260 hp MWM engine
- International WorkStar

=== International Trucks South Africa ===
- International 9800e heavy-duty truck - 405 hp/298 kW Cummins ISX engine, 6x4
- International 9800i heavy-duty truck - 483 hp/355 kW Cummins ISX engine, 6x4
- International WorkStar heavy-duty truck - 405 hp/298 kW Cummins ISM engine, 6x4
- International TranStar heavy-duty truck

On 16 September 2010, Anhui Jianghuai Automobile Co., Ltd. (JAC ) announced joint ventures with NC2 Global that will develop, build, and market heavy duty trucks and diesel engines in China.
