= Scott C. Donnelly =

American businessman (born 1961)

- Born: June 7, 1961 (age 65)
- Occupation: Former Chief executive officer

Scott C. Donnelly (born 1961) was the CEO of Textron. Before joining Textron, Donnelly was the CEO for General Electric Aviation, a producer of jet engines for commercial and military aircraft. Donnelly also served as the Senior Vice President of General Electric Global Research, one of the world's largest industrial research organizations and held various management positions since joining General Electric in 1989.

Donnelly joined GE in 1989 as manager of Electronics Design Engineering for GE's Ocean Systems Division in Syracuse, New York. He went on to serve in a variety of leadership roles for the company, including engineering management positions with then-GE division of Martin Marietta in both Australia and the United States. In 1995, he moved to GE's Industrial Control Systems business, where he held various management positions. Donnelly was named a vice president of GE in 1997, responsible for Global Technology Operations at GE Healthcare.

Donnelly joined Textron in July 2008 as executive vice president and chief operating officer (COO) as part of a multi-year succession plan. On December 1, 2009, Lewis B. Campbell retired as CEO of Textron. He was succeeded as CEO by Donnelly. Donnelly was named chairman of the board on September 1, 2010. After stepping down in 2025, he was succeeded by Lisa Atherton.

Donnelly served on several Engineering advisory committees including that of Cornell and Stanford Universities.
