= Marmon Motor Company =

Defunct American truck manufacturer

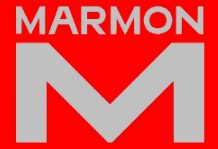
- Industry: Premium trucks
- Founded: 1963; 63 years ago
- Defunct: 1997; 29 years ago
- Fate: Dissolved
- Successor: Navistar International (For construction plant only)
- Headquarters: Denton, Texas, U.S.
- Products: Trucks

Marmon Motor Company was a Texan manufacturer of heavy trucks from 1963 through 1997.

== History ==
In 1963, after Marmon-Herrington, the successor to the Marmon Motor Car Company, ceased truck production, a new company, Marmon Motor Company of Denton, Texas, purchased and revived the Marmon brand to build and sell premium truck designs that Marmon-Herrington had been planning.

The Marmon truck was a low-production, handmade truck sometimes dubbed the Rolls-Royce of trucks. An overcrowded American truck industry and the lack of a nationwide sales network led to the eventual failure of Marmon trucks in the United States. The last Marmon was made in 1997, and the production facilities in Garland, Texas, were taken over by Navistar’s Paystar division.

== Models ==
Models of Marmon trucks over the decades have included:

Marmon Class 8 Trucks
Model Family Name	Production Years	Cab Configuration	Notes
Marmon CHDT	Undefined-1997	Conventional Heavy Duty Tractor	
Marmon 54-F	Undefined-1997	Conventional Fleet 54" cab	
Marmon 54-P	Undefined-1997	Conventional Premium 54" cab	
Marmon 54-FB	Undefined-1997	Conventional Fleet 54" Butterfly Hood	
Marmon 57-F	Undefined-1997	Conventional Fleet 57" cab	
Marmon 57-FB	Undefined-1997	Conventional Fleet 57" Butterfly Hood	
Marmon 57-P	1964-1997	Conventional Premium 57" cab	
Marmon 57-PHR	Undefined-1997	Conventional Premium 57" cab High Rise sleeper	
Marmon 57-L	Undefined-1997	Conventional Lightweight 57" cab	
Marmon 125-D	1996-1997	Conventional Sloped Hood, 125" cab (integral sleeper)	
Marmon 125-DHR	1996-1997	Conventional Sloped Hood, 125" cab (integral sleeper) High Roof	
Marmon 125-P	1992-1997	Conventional Premium, 125" cab (integral sleeper)	
Marmon 125-PHR	1992-1997	Conventional Premium, 125" cab (integral sleeper) High Roof	
Marmon SB57-L	Undefined-1997	Conventional Setback Lightweight, 57" Cab	
Marmon SB90-L	Undefined-1997	Conventional Setback Lightweight, 90" cab (integral sleeper)	
Marmon SB103-L	Undefined-1997	Conventional Setback Lightweight, 103" cab (integral sleeper)	
Marmon SB125-L	Undefined-1997	Conventional Setback Lightweight, 125" cab (integral sleeper)	
Marmon SB125-LHR	Undefined-1997	Conventional Setback Lightweight, 125" cab (integral sleeper) High Rise	
Marmon SB-57R	Undefined-1997	Conventional Setback Regular 57" cab	
Marmon 60-F	Undefined-1997	Cabover/COE Fleet 60" cab	
Marmon 60-P	Undefined-1997	Cabover/COE Premium 60" cab	
Marmon 86-F	1968-1997	Cabover/COE Fleet 86" cab	
Marmon 86-P	1968-1997	Cabover/COE Premium 86" cab	
Marmon 110-P	Undefined-1997	Cabover/COE Premium 110" cab	

== Gallery ==
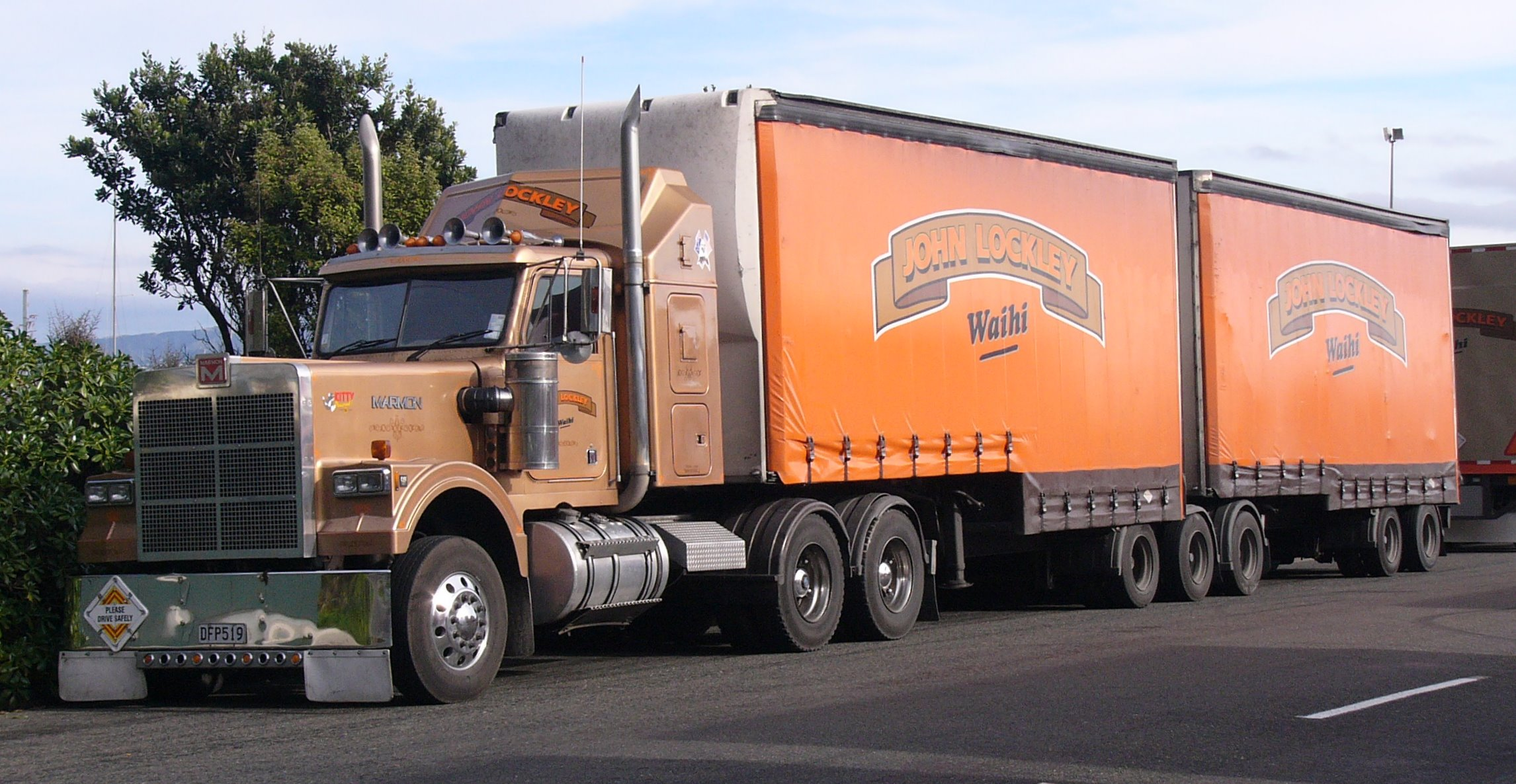
Marmon 57P

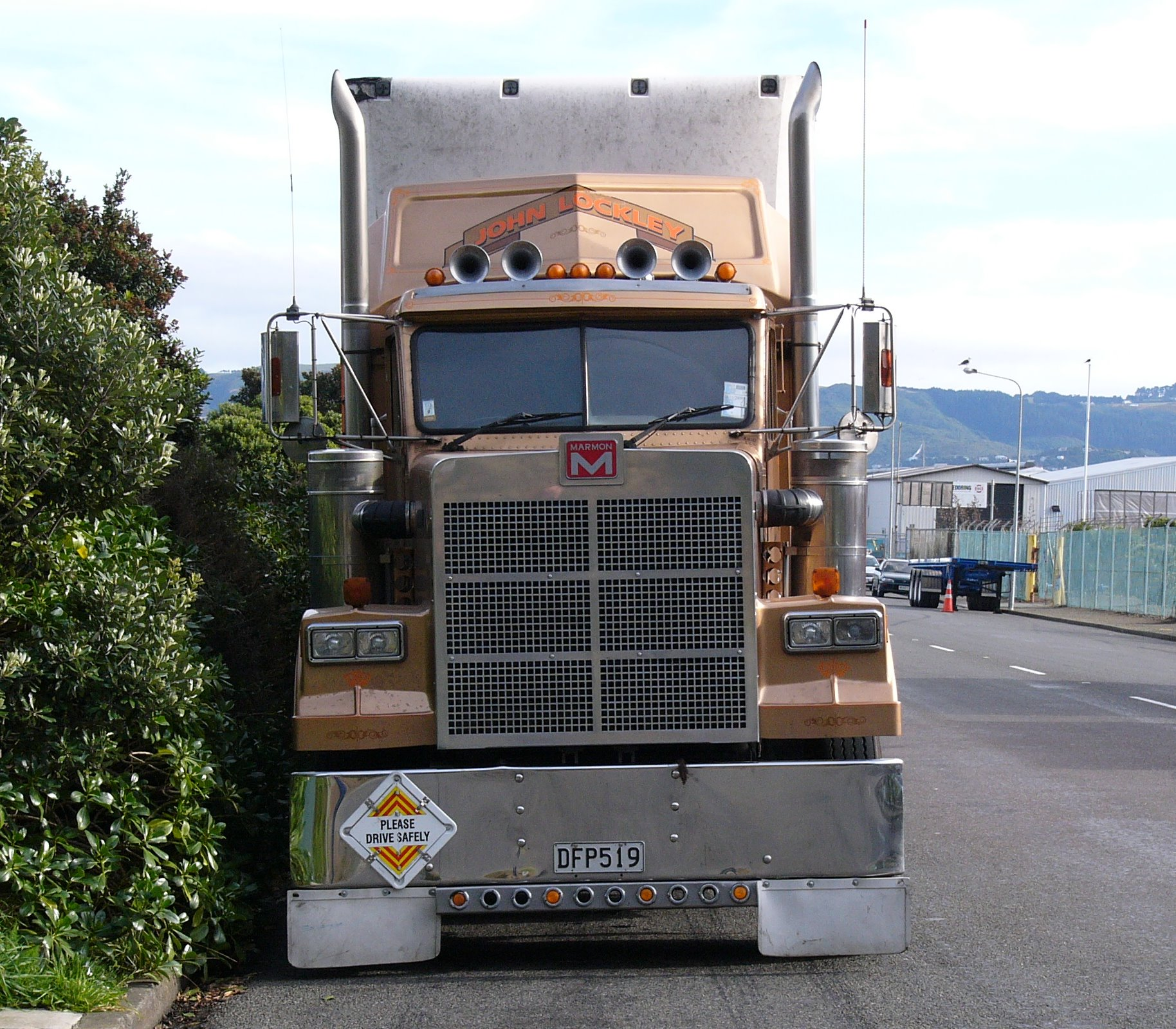
Marmon 57P

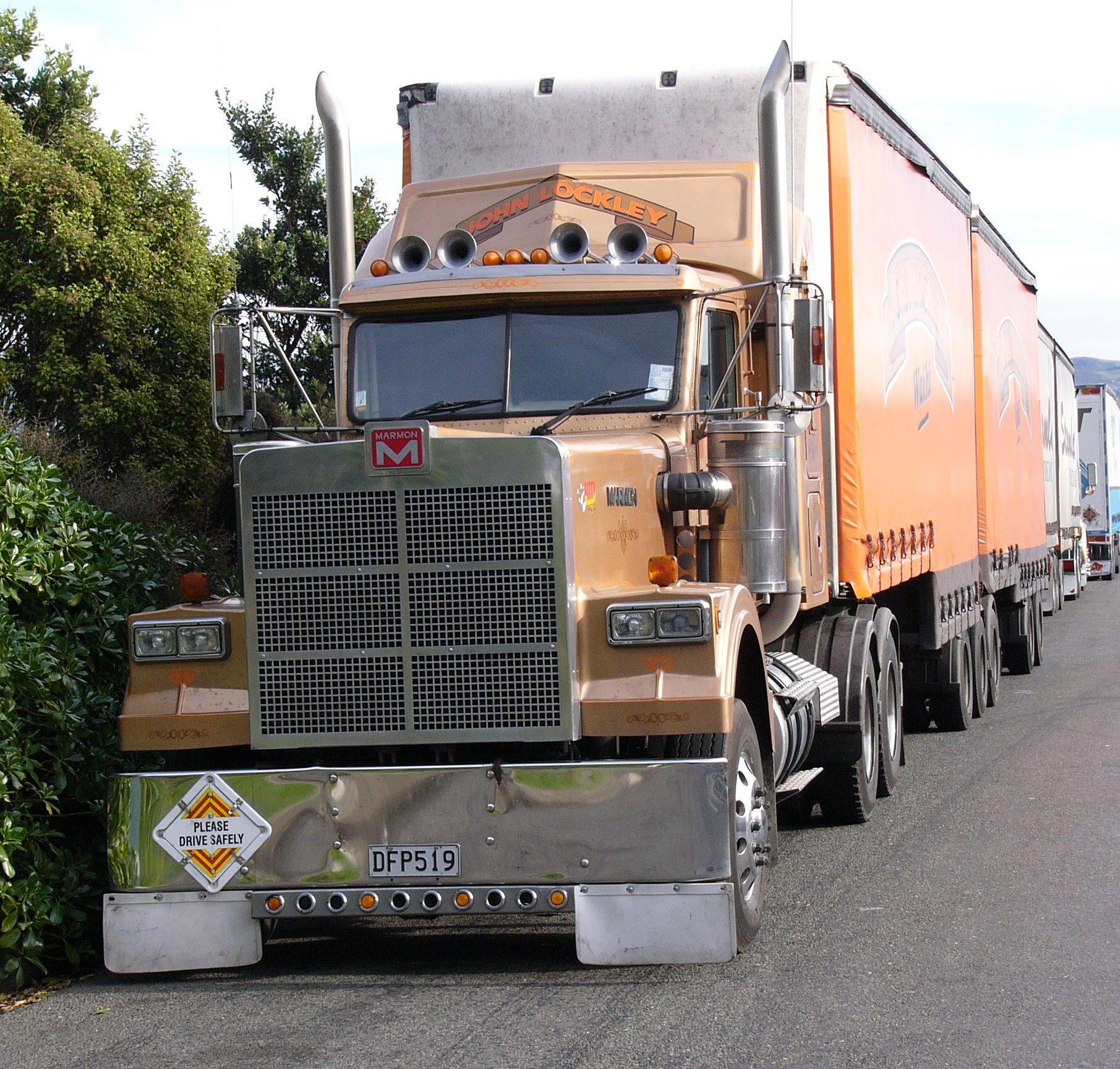
Marmon 57P

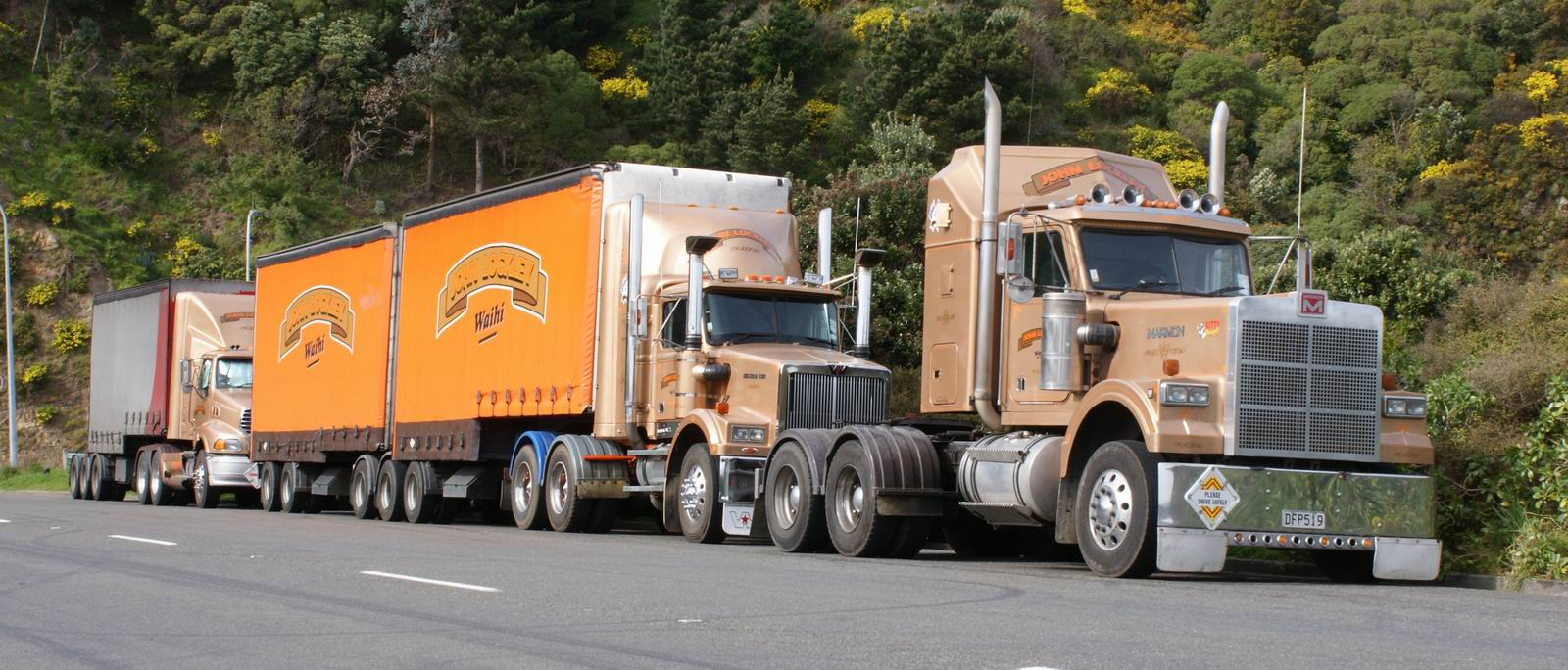
Marmon 57P

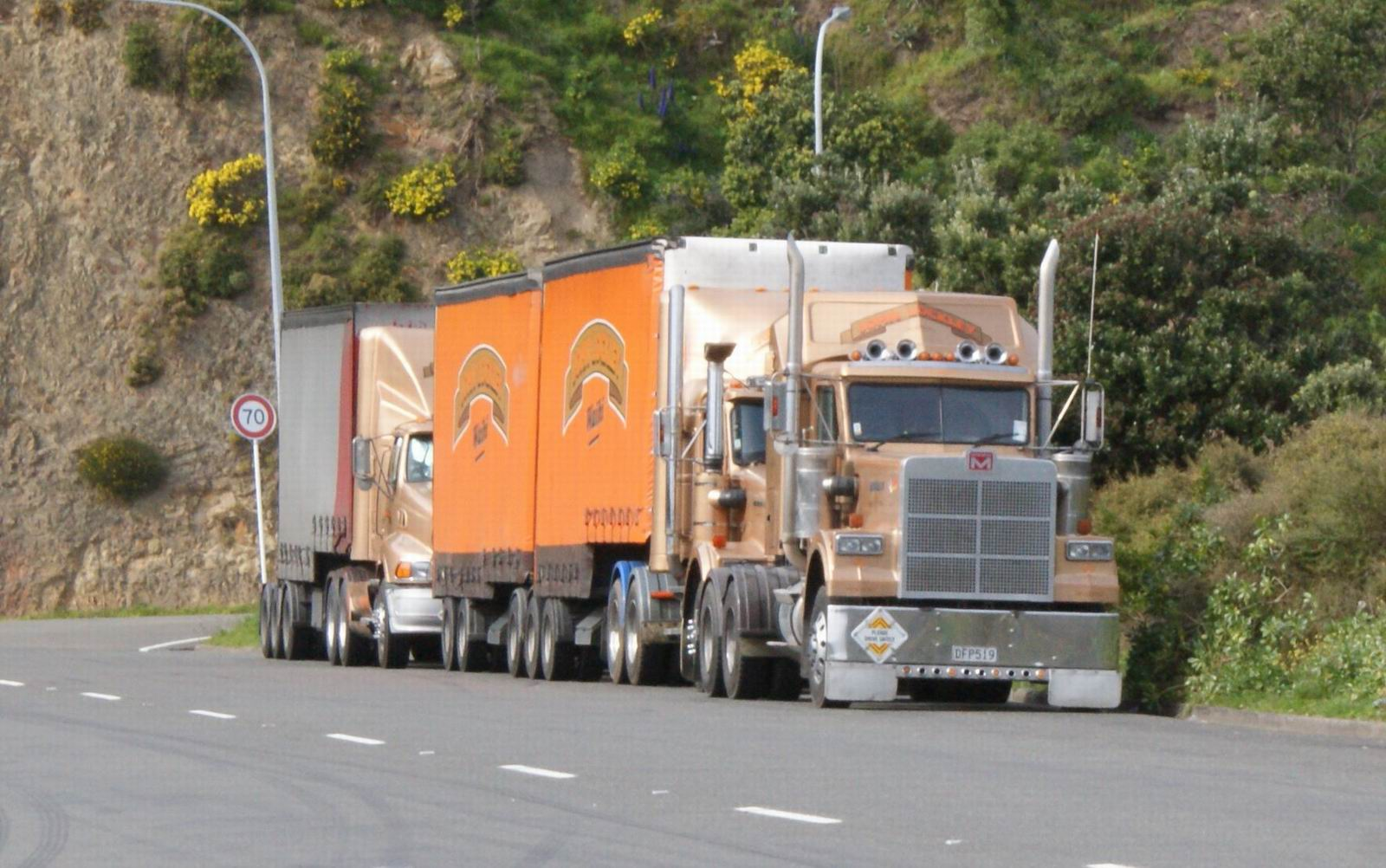
Marmon 57P

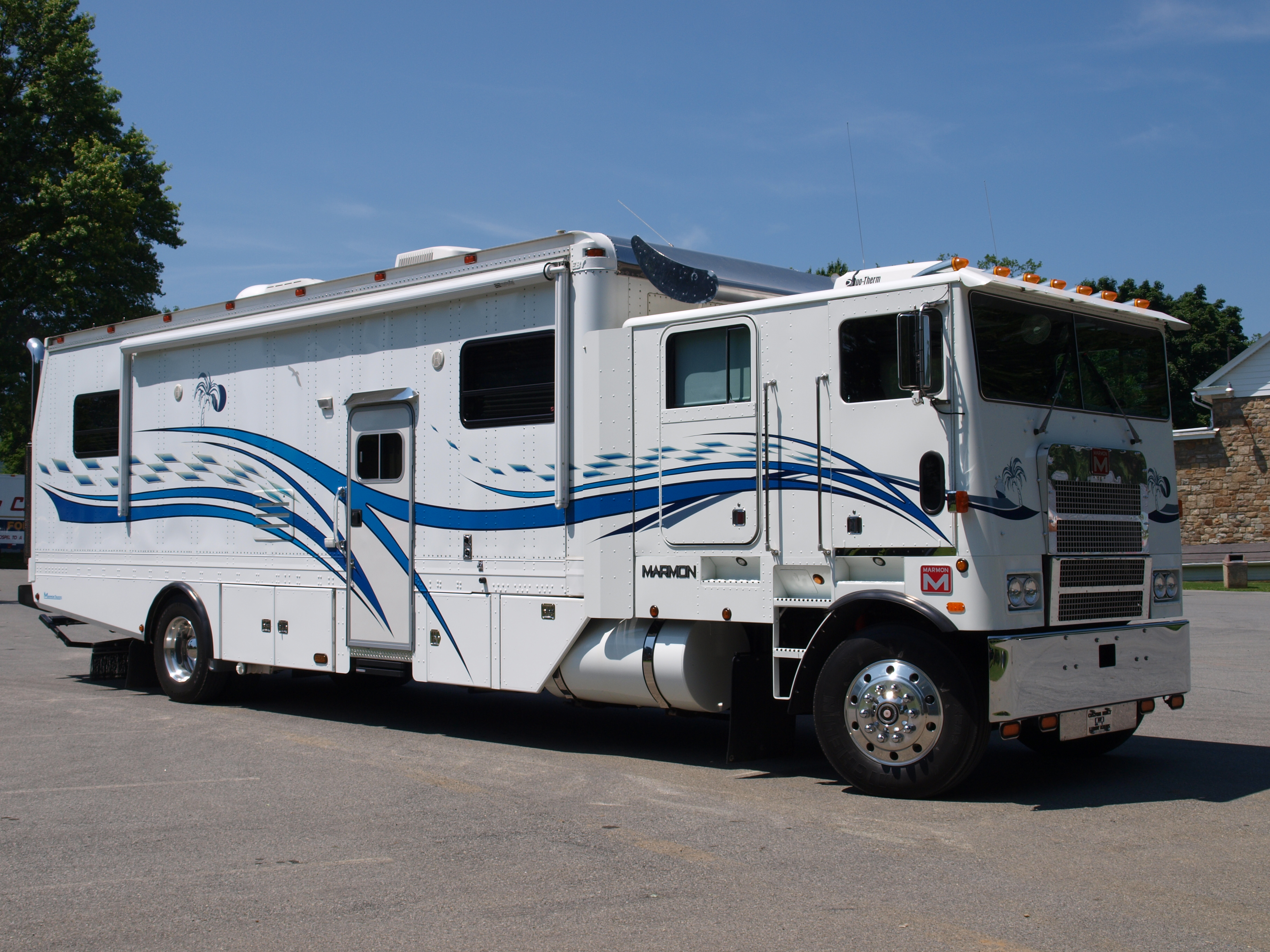
Marmon Motor Home

== See also ==
- Marmon-Herrington
