= International MV Series =

Medium-duty class 6/7 trucks

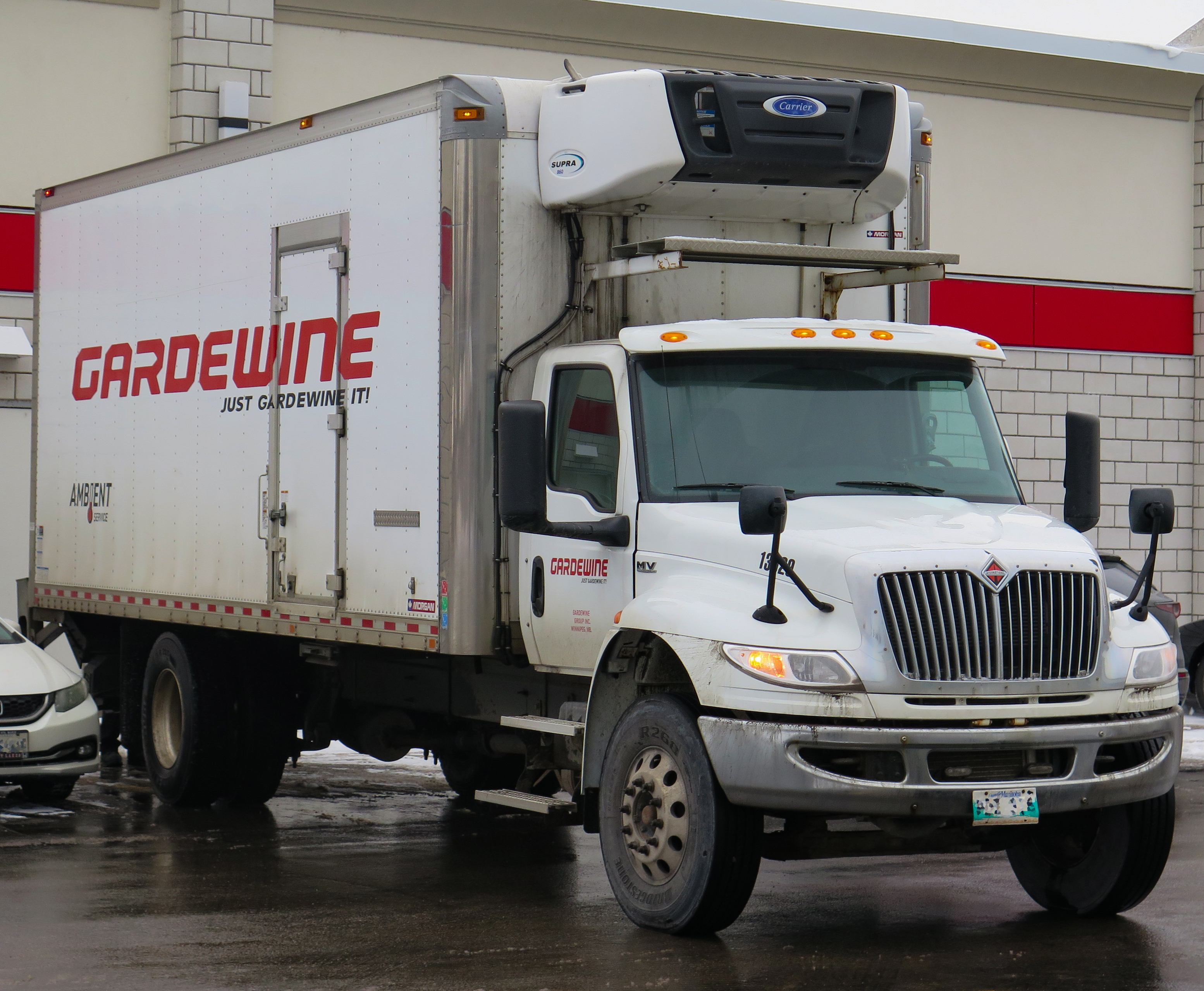
- 2019 International MV607 box truck

Overview
- Manufacturer: Navistar International
- Production: 2018–present
- Model years: 2019–present
- Assembly: United States: Springfield, Ohio; San Antonio, Texas (2022-)

Body and chassis
- Class: Class 6-7
- Body style: Chassis cab: 2-door truck; 2-door extended-cab truck; 4-door crew-cab truck; Semi-tractor: 2-door truck
- Layout: 4x2 6x4
- Chassis: Medium-duty
- Related: IC CE

Powertrain
- Engine: Cummins B6.7; Cummins L9
- Transmission: Allison 1000, 2000, 3000 Series (HS, EVS, RDS, MH); Eaton-Fuller Advantage 10-speed automated manual; Eaton-Fuller 6-speed manual; Eaton-Fuller 10-speed manual

Dimensions
- Length: GVW: 21,500 – 54,600 lbs.
- Width: Outside width: 82.2 in.; Shoulder width: 70.6 in.
- Height: MV607 : 67.7 in.; MV60H (Lo-Profile): 62.8 in.

Chronology
- Predecessor: International DuraStar

The International MV Series is a medium-duty Class 6/7 truck produced by Navistar International since 2018. Introduced as the successor to the DuraStar, the MV Series is slotted below the International Transtar regional-haul semitractor and above the Class 5 International CV.

== Production ==
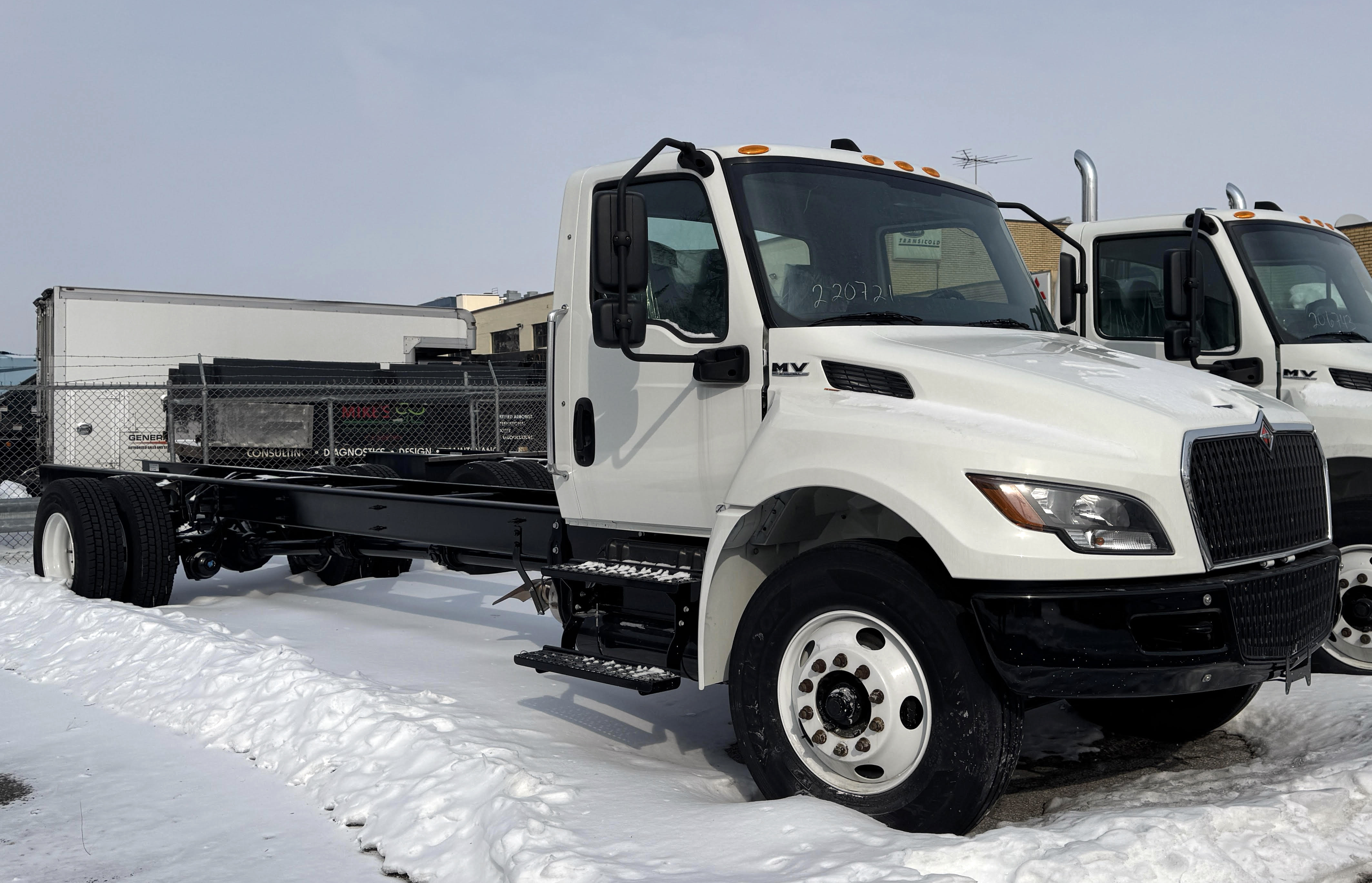
International MV Series with updated front end

In line with revisions to International Class 8 product lines, the MV Series introduced a number of updates to the cab interior. Externally distinguished by larger doors and side windows, the quarter windows of the DuraStar were replaced with a single-piece side window with a lower windowsill. The dashboard underwent extensive changes, with the previous instrument panel replaced by a reconfigurable digital display.

The International MV Series continues its use of Cummins diesel engines, with the Cummins B6.7 and L9 offered, depending on configuration.

In 2021, the MV Series was updated with a redesigned hood and bumper.

== Models ==
The MV is available in two models; the MV607 and the MV60H (Lo-Profile). The 607 has an overall height of 67.7 in. and the 60H has an overall height of 62.8 in.

=== Bus ===
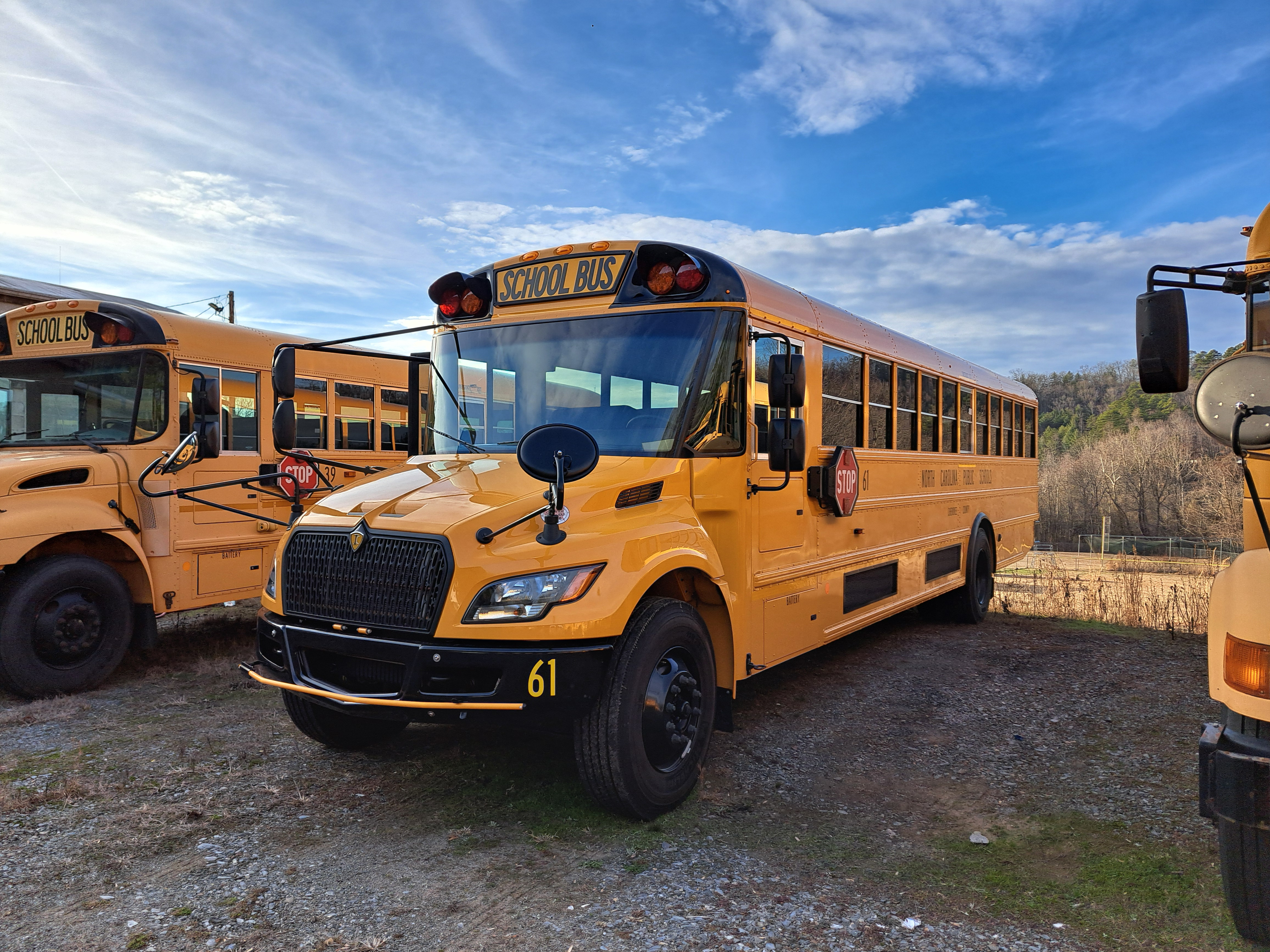
International MV bus chassis with an IC Bus CE Series school bus body

The cowled bus chassis variant of the MV was unveiled on July 14, 2023, for the 2025 model year to replace the DuraStar-based International 3300 after 19 years of its production since 2004. The chassis is exclusively bodied by International's subsidiary IC Bus. As of 2025 production, the MV-based bus chassis is available exclusively in gasoline, diesel and electric powertrain options, dropping the propane option from the previous DuraStar-based chassis.

=== Electric variant (eMV) ===
In 2021, Navistar announced a battery electric variant of the MV Series, the eMV. Navistar and Penske both announced on October 11, 2021, that Penske would be the first fleet in the United States to operate the eMV.
