= NRC =

NRC, or nrc, may refer to:

== Education ==
- NRC School
- Northern Regional College

== Organizations ==
=== Education ===
- National Resource Center, US Department of Education program promoting international studies and languages through grants
- National Resource Center for Health Information Technology, a part of the US Department of Health and Human Services

=== Politics ===
- N. R. Congress, an Indian political party
- National Republican Convention, a Nigerian political party
- National Redemption Council, the ruling government in Ghana from 1972 to 1975
- National Reformation Council, a group of senior military officers who seized control of the Sierra Leone government

=== Research ===
- National Research Centre (Egypt)
- National Research Council Canada
- National Research Council of Sri Lanka
- Nokia Research Center
- United States National Research Council

=== Other organizations ===
- Norwegian Refugee Council
- National Railroad Construction and Maintenance Association, United States
- National Response Center, the sole US government point of contact for reporting all sorts of ecological spills
- NATO–Russia Council
- Nuclear Regulatory Commission, an independent agency of the US government

== Science and technology ==
- Noise reduction coefficient
- Normal retinal correspondence

== Sports ==
- National Rugby Championship, an Australian rugby union competition
- Newbury Racecourse, United Kingdom
- Nigel Reo-Coker, an English footballer
- No Remorse Corps, professional wrestling group
- Nottingham Rowing Club, an English rowing club
- USA Cycling National Racing Calendar, an American set of bicycle racing events

== Transport ==
- Nigerian Railway Corporation
- NRC, the IATA code for NASA Crows Landing Airport in the state of California, US
- NRC, the National Rail code for Newbury Racecourse railway station in the county of Berkshire, UK

== Other uses ==
- NRC Handelsblad, Dutch newspaper that was rebranded as NRC
- National Radio Club, a US non-profit hobbyist organization
- National Register of Citizens, a registry for citizens of India
- Nature Reviews Cancer, a monthly scientific journal of review articles covering the field of oncology
- Netherlands Reformed Congregations
- New Roc City, an American entertainment complex in New Rochelle, New York
- Nigerian Railway Corporation
