= Wayne Wheeled Vehicles =

Defunct subsidiary of Harsco

- Industry: Transportation
- Predecessor: Wayne Corporation
- Founded: 1992; 34 years ago
- Defunct: 1995; 31 years ago
- Fate: Dissolved by parent company
- Headquarters: Marysville, Ohio, United States
- Area served: North America
- Products: school buses
- Parent: Harsco Corporation

Wayne Wheeled Vehicles (WWV) was a tradename of a division of a vehicle manufacturer that specialized primarily in the production of school buses. It was owned by Harsco Corporation, who purchased the rights to use the Wayne brand name, certain product rights, as well as parts and tooling during the liquidation of assets of the Wayne Corporation in late 1992.

The BMY-Wheeled Vehicles Division of Harsco operated the WWV function from an assembly facility at Marysville, Ohio, where it also assembled military trucks. School bus production began there in 1993 and ended in early 1995. The entire operation was closed and the property vacated.

== Overview ==
After the bankruptcy of its parent company Richmond Transportation Corporation in 1992, bus manufacturer Wayne Corporation was liquidated at auction. In February 1993, the product rights of Wayne and many other assets were purchased for $2.1 million by BMY, a military truck assembler owned by industrial conglomerate Harsco Corporation. The company itself was not purchased in its entirety, including its subsidiaries, pensions, and other liabilities; in addition, the Richmond, Indiana factory was not included in the sale.

Under its Defense Group, Harsco supplied military vehicles to the US Army, with BMY assembling the "Big Foot", a five-ton truck whose tires partially deflated for sand travel. Following the end of the Persian Gulf War, BMY sought to diversify its production due to a decreased demand for military vehicles.

Following the sale, BMY transferred production of the Wayne Lifeguard, Lifestar, and Chaperone product lines to its Marysville, Ohio facility; for the first time since 1875, Waynes were not built in Richmond, Indiana. To reflect the change of ownership of the Wayne name, the company was renamed Wayne Wheeled Vehicles (in line with BMY-Wheeled Vehicles), often adopting the WWV or BMY-WWV acronym.

=== Closure ===
During the early 1990s, the ownership of school bus manufacturers underwent significant transition. Along with the bankruptcy of Wayne Corporation, Carpenter Industries also struggled with financial survival (filing and emerging from bankruptcy in 1990). The ownership of Blue Bird, Thomas, and AmTran/Ward would all change, as the former two transitioned from family-owned companies and AmTran was acquired by Navistar in 1991. The acquisition of AmTran marked the beginning of a series of joint ventures between industry suppliers and manufacturers, effectively leaving Wayne at a comparative disadvantage.

For parent company BMY, demand for its primary product line declined further; truck assembly at the Marysville plant ended in June 1994. Harsco announced a deal in January, 1995 to sell the BMY-WWV operation to Warrwick Industries, a Goshen, Indiana-based commercial bus manufacturer of Goshen Coach products. After the deal with Warrwick Industries failed to consummate, Harsco ended bus assembly at the Marysville plant in June 1995.

== Products ==
Wayne Wheeled Vehicles purchased the rights to the Wayne product line and returned the full-size Lifeguard conventional and Lifestar transit-style school buses to production. The most notable change was the change in chassis supplier for the Lifestar after the 1992 model year. Instead of using the International 3900 chassis (shared with the AmTran Genesis), WWV switched to an all-new chassis supplied by Crane Carrier Corporation.

BMY-WWV also produced hundreds of Wayne Chaperone models built on G30 cutaway van chassis supplied by General Motors under the Chevrolet and GMC brand names.

Wayne Wheeled Vehicles Product Line
Model Name	Chaperone	Lifeguard	Lifestar	RD 9000
Production	1992-1995	1992-1995	1992-1995	1995
Chassis Type	Chevrolet G30/GMC Vandura	Ford B-Series; International 3800	International 3900 (1992); Crane Carrier (1993-1995)	Spartan Motors
Notes	Introduced for 1985, replaced Busette after 1990			RD 9000 was a prototype rear-engine Type D school bus; Never mass-produced.

== Prototype ==
In 1995, WWV unveiled a prototype of an all-new transit-style school bus called the Wayne RD 9000, featuring many innovations never before seen in school buses. Between several lost bids for more military trucks and questionable profitability of the WWV production, BMY shut down completely and closed the Marysville plant in 1995. The RD 9000 never entered mass production. Most of its groundbreaking features were adopted by other school bus builders five to ten years later.
