= Wayne Lifestar =

Overview
- Manufacturer: Wayne Corporation; Wayne Wheeled Vehicles
- Also called: Welles Lifestar (Canada)
- Production: 1986–1995
- Assembly: Richmond, Indiana (1986–1992); Marysville, Ohio (1992–1995)
- Designer: Wayne Corporation

Body and chassis
- Class: Type D
- Body style: school bus
- Layout: front-engine 4×2
- Related: Wayne Lifeguard

Powertrain
- Engine: Diesel
- Transmission: Automatic

Chronology
- Predecessor: Wayne RE
- Successor: Wayne RD-9000 (prototype only)

The Wayne Lifestar is a product line of buses that was manufactured and marketed by Wayne Corporation and its successor company Wayne Wheeled Vehicles from 1986 to 1995. Produced nearly exclusively in a school bus configuration, the Wayne Lifestar used a transit-style body configuration with a front-engine chassis. Marking the return to transit-style production (after an absence of over a decade), the Lifestar adopted the single-piece body stampings of the Wayne Lifeguard in its construction.

Wayne Corporation manufactured the Lifestar from 1986 to 1992 at its Richmond, Indiana facility. Following the closure and liquidation of Wayne Corporation, Wayne Wheeled Vehicles manufactured the product line from 1993 to 1995 in Marysville, Ohio.

In 1996, up to 325 Wayne Lifestar school buses (model years 1993 to 1995) were among the 11,500 nationwide subject to recall by the National Highway Traffic Safety Administration, for not meeting federal safety standards for fuel-system integrity.

== Overview and development ==
In the late 1960s, Wayne Corporation produced a rear-engine transit-style school bus similar to other major school bus manufacturers. As Wayne did not have the manufacturing equipment or capacity to build the chassis in-house, it sourced its rear-engine chassis from Chevrolet. When General Motors discontinued its Chevrolet/GMC rear-engine bus chassis production in 1973, Wayne was forced to end production of its transit-style school bus in favor of the Lifeguard conventional introduced that year. Beyond 1973, all transit-style buses from Wayne became special-order vehicles for military and GSA (federal government) purchases with chassis outsourced from other manufacturers; the transit-style buses were too expensive to produce at a competitive price as a school bus.

As the 1970s became the 1980s, the school bus industry was in a period of relative turmoil: along with the struggling economy, fewer Americans were school-age than in years past. Innovation and low cost were key to attracting school bus orders. To do so, Wayne Corporation was necessitated to develop a transit-style school bus that could be sold at a lower purchase price; for larger fleets, their higher capacity theoretically allowed for fewer buses per students transported. Named Lifestar, the new vehicle would feature the continuous longitudinal interior and exterior panels of the Lifeguard for the sides and roof, both for safety and for parts commonality.

=== Prototype development ===
Identification of an appropriate chassis design from an outside supplier to meet engineering, volume, and cost considerations was essential to the project and the future of Lifestar. In the prototype stage, Wayne developed both front- and rear-engine versions of the Lifestar, as the majority of manufacturers (with the exception of Ward, Crown Coach, and Gillig) offered both configurations.

At the Welles plant in Canada, where many Wayne experimental projects had been done over the years, a rear-engine prototype was constructed, while a front-engine prototype was constructed in Richmond. The final decision was to produce the Lifestar only in the front-engine body style, primarily for cost considerations.

The front-engine bus program proved more successful than rear-engine development efforts, and saw production with several different chassis. The initial production run of Lifestars were of a front engine (FE) design; production began in 1986. A rear-engine model would have been more costly than a front-engine model, and likely would have achieved lower production volumes. Competitors in that market were the Thomas Saf-T-Liner ER and Blue Bird All American RE. Each bus was a premium product; although Thomas built its own chassis for the Saf-T-Liner ER at the time the Lifestar was introduced, production volume for the All American RE was low enough that Blue Bird outsourced its rear-engine chassis until 1988.

== First generation (1986–1990) ==
When introduced for 1986, Wayne Corporation selected the all-new General Motors S7 front-engine bus chassis for the Lifestar body; supported by the GM medium-duty truck service network, the S7 chassis was identified as both a Chevrolet and a GMC (using the steering wheel badging of either brand). The standard powertrain for the S7 chassis was a Chevrolet 366 (6.0L) V8 gasoline V8 (according to 1987 GMC Chassis Brochure), offering an optional Detroit Diesel 8.2L diesel V8 in either naturally aspirated ("Fuel Pincher") or turbocharged configuration.

Along with a chassis sourced from a major manufacturer, the body of the Lifestar was developed to reduce production and maintenance costs, using flat windshield glass (to lower replacement costs) and a nearly flat front bodywork stamping.

From its 1986 launch, the S7 product line was plagued with supply problems. In addition to underpinning the Lifestar, the GM chassis was also adopted by similar product lines from competing bus manufacturers Carpenter and Ward/AmTran. In 1989, General Motors ended production of the S7 product line entirely.

As a temporary solution, Milton H. Smith, a truck and bus dealer and school bus contractor based in Plaistow, New Hampshire (who served as one of the larger Wayne bus dealers in the United States) began to import chassis from South Korea. Essentially gliders with an American-sourced powertrain (a Caterpillar 3208 diesel and an Allison MT643 automatic), the chassis were fitted to the Lifestar with redesigned engine covers to fit the larger Caterpillar engine. Branded as "Asia-Smith" chassis, the venture was ultimately not well-received in U.S. markets and many sat at the Wayne Indiana plant for an extended time awaiting body orders. Due to the supply issues of the GM S-7 affecting other manufacturers, some surplus Asia-Smith chassis were sold off to other manufacturers to be fitted with bus bodies; some were purchased by Ward/AmTran (for the Ward President) and from short-lived startup New Bus Company from Oklahoma (for the New Bus Chickasha FE).

== Second generation (1991–1992) ==
For its 1991 production, Wayne Corporation updated the Lifestar out of necessity. Following the discontinuation of the Caterpillar 3208 engine for road use in the United States, the Asia-Smith chassis was left without an engine. In response, Wayne introduced a third chassis supplier for the Lifestar, shifting to the International 3900FC for 1991 production. Though shared with Ward/AmTran and Carpenter (and Canadian bus manufacturer EMC/Corbeil), the 3900FC provided the Lifestar with a reliable source of chassis production.

The shift to a Navistar-sourced chassis (powered by either a DTA360 or optional DT466 inline-6 turbodiesel) would result in several modifications to the body of the Lifestar. The most visible changes included a 4-piece wrap-around windshield (created by the relocation of the entry door), the introduction of quad headlights, and an all-new grille. The interior saw multiple changes, including the introduction of a Navistar-sourced steering column and instrument panel.

This generation of the Lifestar was only produced for two years, as Richmond Transportation Corporation, then the parent company of Wayne, filed for Chapter 11 bankruptcy and Wayne Corporation was liquidated and sold.

=== Wayne vs. AmTran ===
Other body manufacturers also expressed interest in the 3900, and AmTran (still selling buses bearing the Ward brand name) developed a product based upon it, the Ward Senator (which later evolved as the AmTran Genesis); however, AmTran was also working on a rear-engined model using the 3900 components to be fully assembled at its Conway, Arkansas plant utilizing Navistar mechanical components; this saw production as the 1996 AmTran RE. The rear-engine concept promised substantially lower costs than chassis assembled at the Navistar plant at Springfield, Ohio, and in comparison, would put the Wayne Lifestar with the Springfield chassis at a significant price bidding disadvantage in the marketplace.

== Third generation (1993–1995) ==
After Richmond Transportation Corporation's bankruptcy filing and liquidation in 1992, the assets of Wayne were acquired by Harsco Corporation. At the end of 1992, Wayne Wheeled Vehicles (WWV) began production of the Wayne Lifeguard and Lifestar out of Marysville, Ohio.

During the transition, Navistar was replaced as a chassis supplier by heavy-duty vehicle manufacturer Crane Carrier Corporation (CCC), replacing the engine with a Cummins 5.9L inline-6 turbodiesel. In contrast to the previous model revision, the CCC chassis used nearly an identical body as the 1991-1992 Lifestar with the 3900FC, distinguished primarily by the change of powertrain and the replacement of Navistar-sourced components.

== Model discontinuation ==
For 1988 production, Blue Bird introduced the Blue Bird TC/2000. In line with the Lifestar, the TC/2000 was developed to lower production costs over the long-running All American, initially offered in a front-engine configuration and with minimal exterior chrome. While the Lifestar and TC/2000 shared a front-engine design layout, the two model lines differed as the latter was not negatively affected by chassis supply. At the time of its launch, Ward/AmTran had projected that the TC/2000 would secure a full 10% of the U.S. school bus market by 1990.

Wayne continued to struggle for market share in 1990. In mid-June 1990, the Welles plant in Canada was closed.

In early 1991, Navistar International announced that it had purchased a one third of AmTran, the manufacturer of Ward school bus bodies, and one of Wayne's long-time competitors. This was seen by many industry observers as an ominous sign for Wayne's future, as Navistar was its largest supplier of both conventional and Type D chassis. Wayne had no major alliance to guarantee a source of chassis, nor any in-house capacity to do so.

In August 1992, Richmond Transportation Corporation (RTC) was forced to declare bankruptcy. Assets were sold by a federal bankruptcy judge at auction that fall. Wayne, essentially in name only, lived on as Wayne Wheeled Vehicles until 1995 under different ownership.

== See also ==
- AmTran Genesis
- Blue Bird TC/2000 FE
- Carpenter Cavalier FE
- Carpenter Counselor FE
- Thomas Saf-T-Liner MVP EF
- Thomas All-Star EF
- Ward Senator
