= M915 =

M915 may refer to:

- A model of Dual-Purpose Improved Conventional Munition used by the United States military
- M915 (truck), a tactical vehicle produced by AM General and used by the United States military
