= WJDI =

Cottekill, New York; United States
- Broadcast area: Poughkeepsie, New York
- Frequency: 1620 kHz
- Branding: WJDI

Programming
- Format: Silent

Ownership
- Owner: Dave Schneider

History
- First air date: January 1, 1970; 56 years ago
- Last air date: December 31, 1996; 29 years ago
- Former frequencies: 1580 kHz (1970–1976)

Technical information
- Power: 2,500 watts
- Transmitter coordinates: 41°56′11″N 73°0′30″W

WJDI (1620 AM) was a pirate radio station run by Dave Schneider. It was located in Cottekill, New York during its three iterations.

It was one of the pioneering and most successful pirate stations, known as "The Pirate King". Despite being a pirate radio, the station was a member of the National Radio Club. This made a lasting impression on so many DXers across the world.

== History ==
WJDI began its broadcast on January 1, 1970, on 1580 kHz. Run by Dave Schneider, it used Meissner Signal Shifter as its transmitter. The Meissner Signal Shifter used plug-in grid coils wound for amateur radio frequencies. Later on, the station began using Collins 30K transmitter rated for about 300 watts. Since the transmitter only covered 3.5 MHz and higher, it a new set of plug-in coils with the aid of Schneider's Millen grid dip meter. In 1976, WJDI received a warning from the Federal Communications Commission (FCC) for running a pirate station. In 1977, when Schneider moved to Arizona to work for Motorola Research on the Voyager II project, WJDI ceased its operations.

In fall 1989, Schneider relaunched WJDI on 1620 kHz. This time, it used a home-made transmitter, which had an output power of 1,000 to 1,250 watts, and the final tube was a 4CX15000J and the modulators were 3000A7s driven with a FET modulation driver. A year later, its power increased to 2,500 watts. WJDI aired an Adult Top 40 format with clever parody commercials, such as the famous dioxin “No Roach!” ad. In January 1991, WJDI was raided once again by the FCC, and was fined. As a result, WJDI went off the air for the next few years.

Schneider built a home-made 15 kW transmitter from scratch for 6 months. It was equipped with a Harris RF-1310 exciter, Harris RF-590 receiver, 4-1000a tube and 810s modulators. It turned out to be an actual AM broadcast band transmitter (not a 160-meter amateur rig). Its 300-foot (91 m) antenna had a horizontal 5-wire cage design, had the required 400 amp electrical service, and its design was directional with nulls produced in certain directions. Reception reports came in from all over the country and beyond. Only two official broadcasts were made: December 25 and 31, 1996. From that point, WJDI was never heard on air again.
