= Professional car =

Long-wheelbase car for commercial or industrial functions

A professional car is loosely defined as a vehicle based on a special long wheelbase commercial chassis and sometimes, though rarely, on modified passenger car chassis, for use as a hearse, flower car, service car, ambulance, limousines or for a combination of purposes (e.g. combination hearse-ambulances, sedan-ambulances or invalid coaches). The term is mostly used in the United States.

Until the 1980s, there were many coachbuilders in the United States that produced professional cars. The cars were built on long-wheelbase versions of American full-size chassis, such as the 1931–1976 Cadillac Commercial Chassis, 1937–1954 Packard 180 and 1965–1975 Oldsmobile 98.

Since the 1970s, ambulances began to provide increasing levels of on-scene care, which required more equipment to be transported and therefore larger vehicles. It was no longer feasible for ambulances to be based on passenger car chassis, therefore the use of professional cars as ambulances declined. The downsizing of American full-size passenger cars to smaller chassis from 1977 also reduced the feasibility of professional cars.

== See also ==
- Combination car
- Miller-Meteor
- Cotner-Bevington
