= M915 (truck) =

Tractor unit used for line haul missions by the US Army

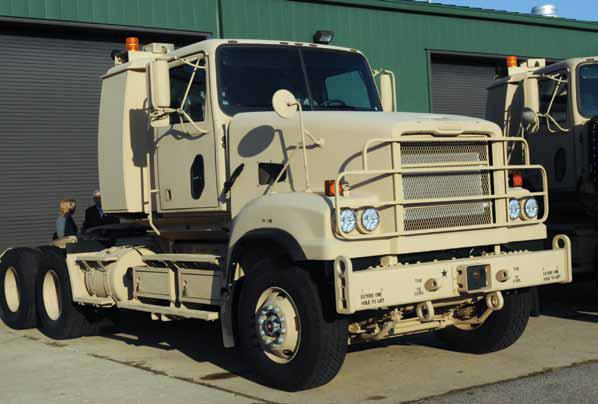
- A M915A5
- Type: 6x4 semi-tractor
- Place of origin: United States

Production history
- Designer: Crane Carrier Co. (M915); Freightliner (M915A2)
- Manufacturer: AM General (M915, M915A1); Freightliner (M915A2 and later)

Specifications (M915A2)
- Mass: 18,680 lb (8,470 kg) (empty)
- Length: 22 ft 11 in (6.99 m)
- Width: 8 ft 2 in (2.49 m)
- Height: 9 ft 11 in (3.02 m)
- Engine: Detroit Diesel DDEC II; 400 hp (300 kW)
- Transmission: 4-speed automatic
- Suspension: Beam axles on leaf springs
- Operational range: 300 miles (480 km)
- Maximum speed: 55 mph (89 km/h)

The M915 is a tractor unit used for line-haul missions by the United States Army. Designed for use on improved roads, it does not have a driven front axle.

== History ==
The M915 is the namesake and basis of a tactical truck series, although it is not tactical itself. It is a commercial type conventional 6x4 rear wheel drive 14-ton semi-tractor designed for use on improved roads. A powered front axle and other tactical equipment are not needed for this role, allowing a lighter and simpler truck. It shares the engine, transmission, cab, and some components of the other trucks in the series.

The more specialized trucks in the series are the M916 6x6 all wheel drive 14-Ton Light Equipment Transporter (LET) tractor with rear winch; M917 8x6 20-ton, 12 cubic yard Dump Truck; M918 6x6 22.5-ton, 1,500 gallon Bituminous Distributor; M919 8x6 22.5-ton, 8 cubic yard Concrete Mixer; and M920 8x6 20-ton Medium Equipment Transporter (MET) tractor with rear winch, all of which are employed in Engineer Combat Support and Construction units.

The M915 and follow on M915A1 were a Crane Carrier Company design based on CCC's Centaur commercial tractor, built under contract by AM General between 1978 and 1982. The 1990 -A2 upgrade was a completely different truck: a Freightliner Trucks design with a different engine and transmission, hood and cab. Older models were upgraded to -A4 standard with a new cab and frame that used the original truck's components. Starting in 2009 M915A3s were upgraded to the armored -A5 standard.

== Engine and driveline ==
The M915 has a 855 cu in (14.0 L) Cummins NTC 400 developing 400 hp (300 kW) at 2100rpm and 1,150 lbf⋅ft (1,559 N⋅m) of torque at 1500rpm. The M915A2 had a 775 cu in (12.7 L) Detroit Diesel Series 60 DDEC II developing 400 hp (300 kW) at 2100rpm and 1,400 lbf⋅ft (1,898 N⋅m) of torque at 1200rpm. Both are turbocharged inline 6 cylinder 4-stroke diesel engine, both engines are intercooled. The Cummins uses a water to air after-cooler while the Series 60 uses an air to air after-cooler.

The M915 has a Caterpillar 16 speed semi-automatic transmission, the M915A2 Allison HT-470 4-speed automatic.

== Chassis ==
A conventional ladder frame has a front steering axle with a 12,000 lb (5,400 kg) weight rating and tandem rear axles with a 40,000 lb (18,000 kg) weight rating. The truck can have a maximum weight of 52,000 lb (24,000 kg), including a 30,000 lb (14,000 kg) load. The total weight rating of the truck and trailer is 105,000 lb (48,000 kg).

A Holland commercial type sliding fifth wheel could carry 30,000 lb (14,000 kg). It towed the M871 22 1/2-ton (20,400 kg) 2 axle flatbed, the M872 34-ton (30,800 kg) 3 axle flatbed, and the M1067.

== Operators ==
- Afghanistan
- Chile
- Lebanon
- Moldova
- United States

== Gallery ==
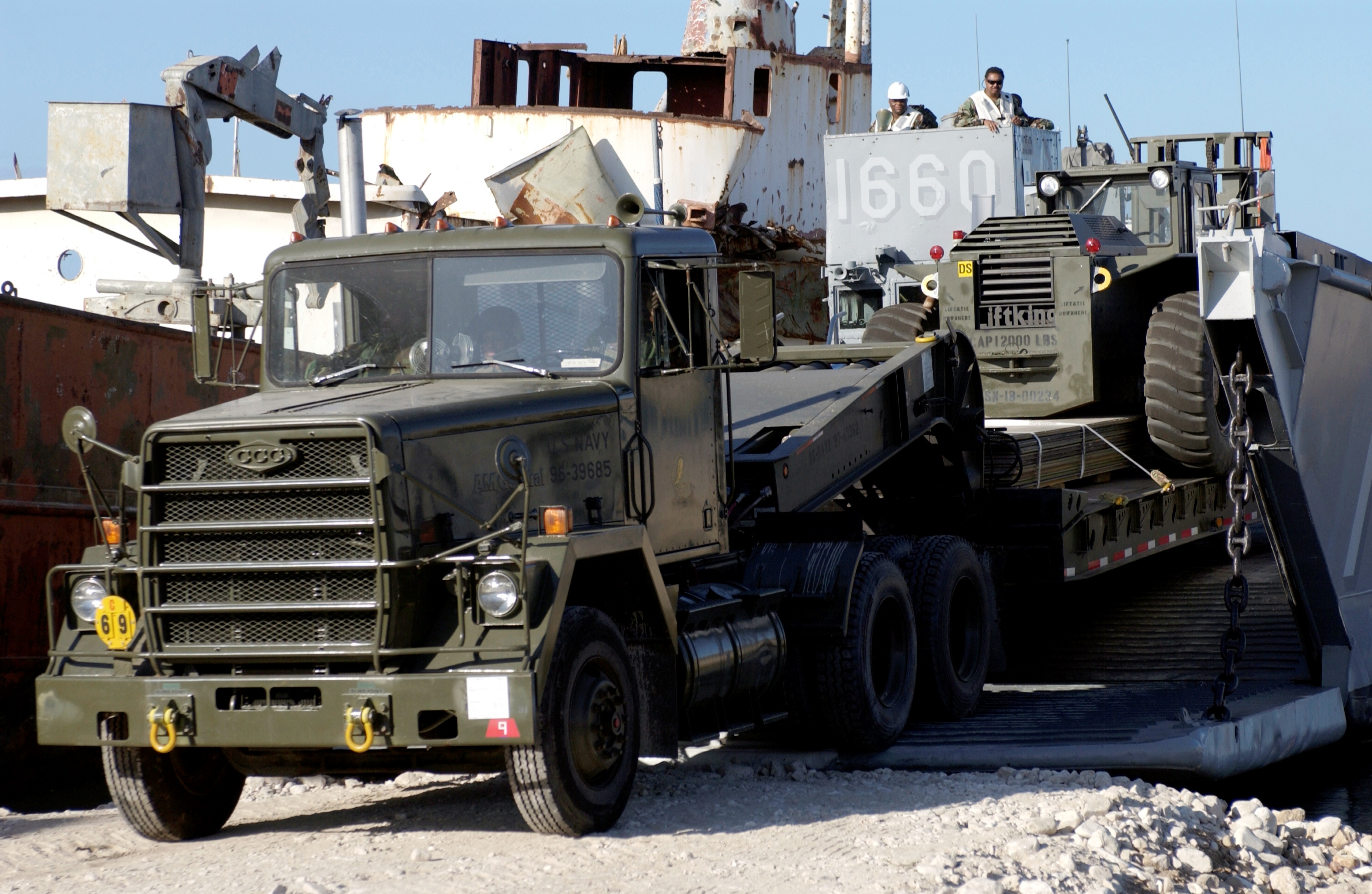
M915

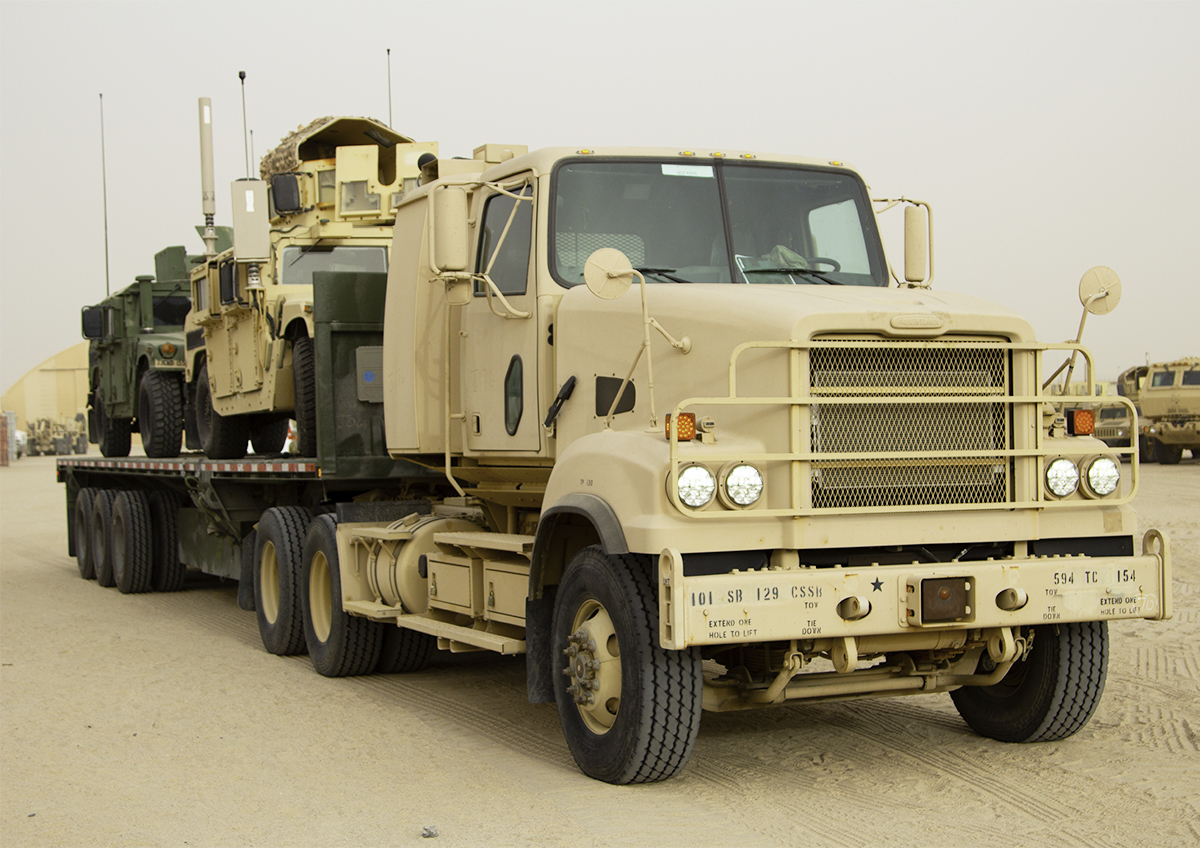
M915 truck deployed in Kuwait

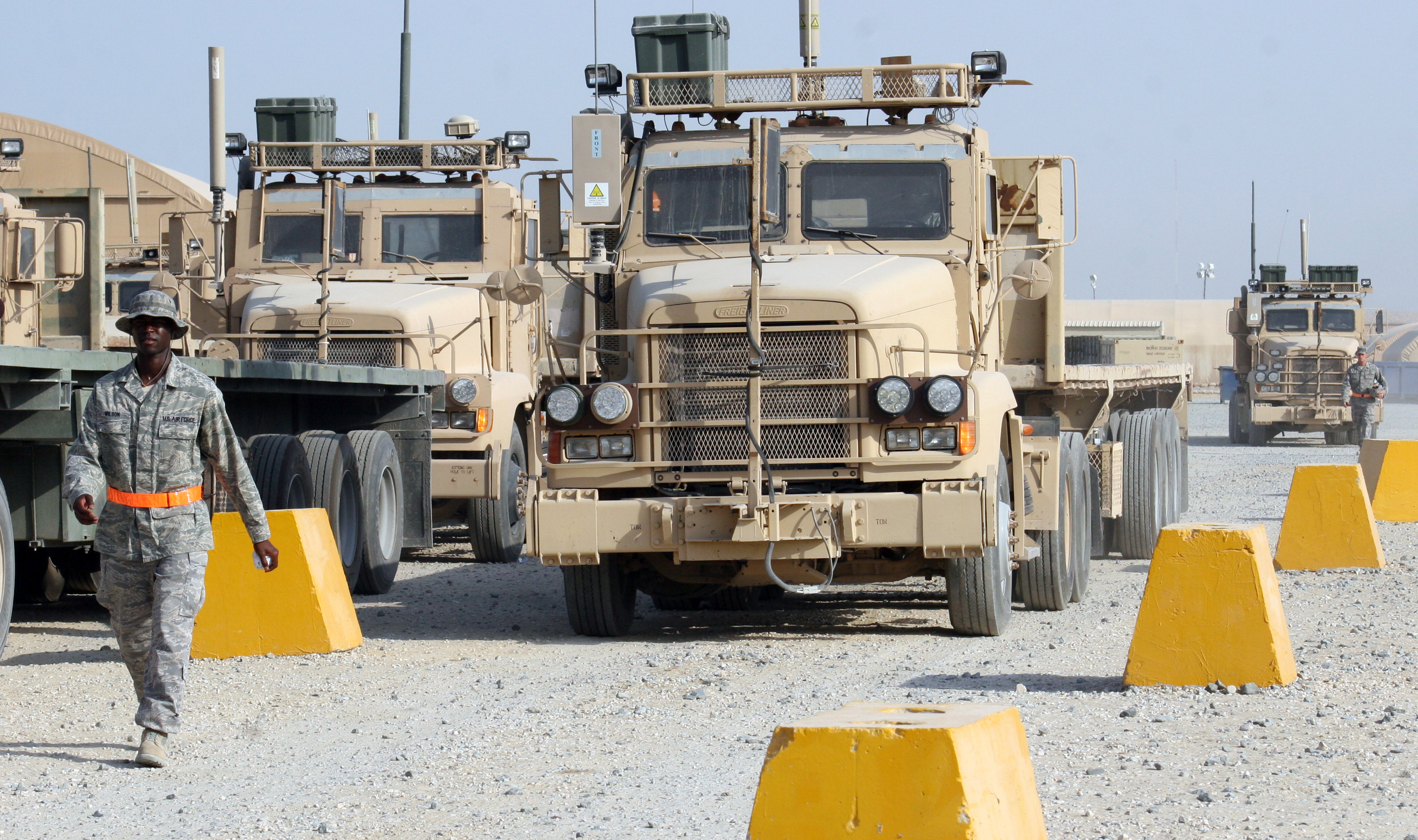
M915A3

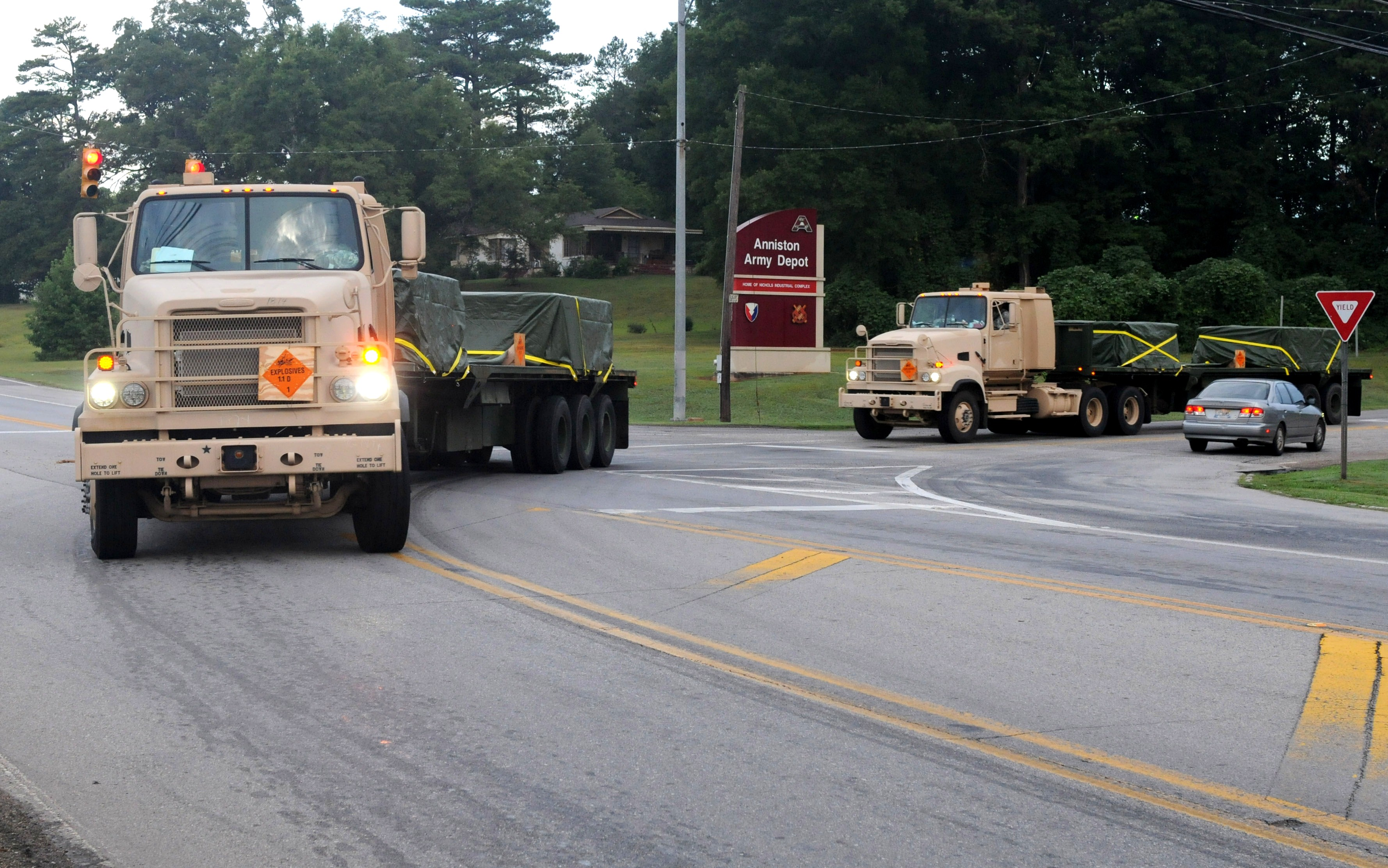
M915A5
