= Kid hack =

Horse-drawn vehicle used to bring children to school

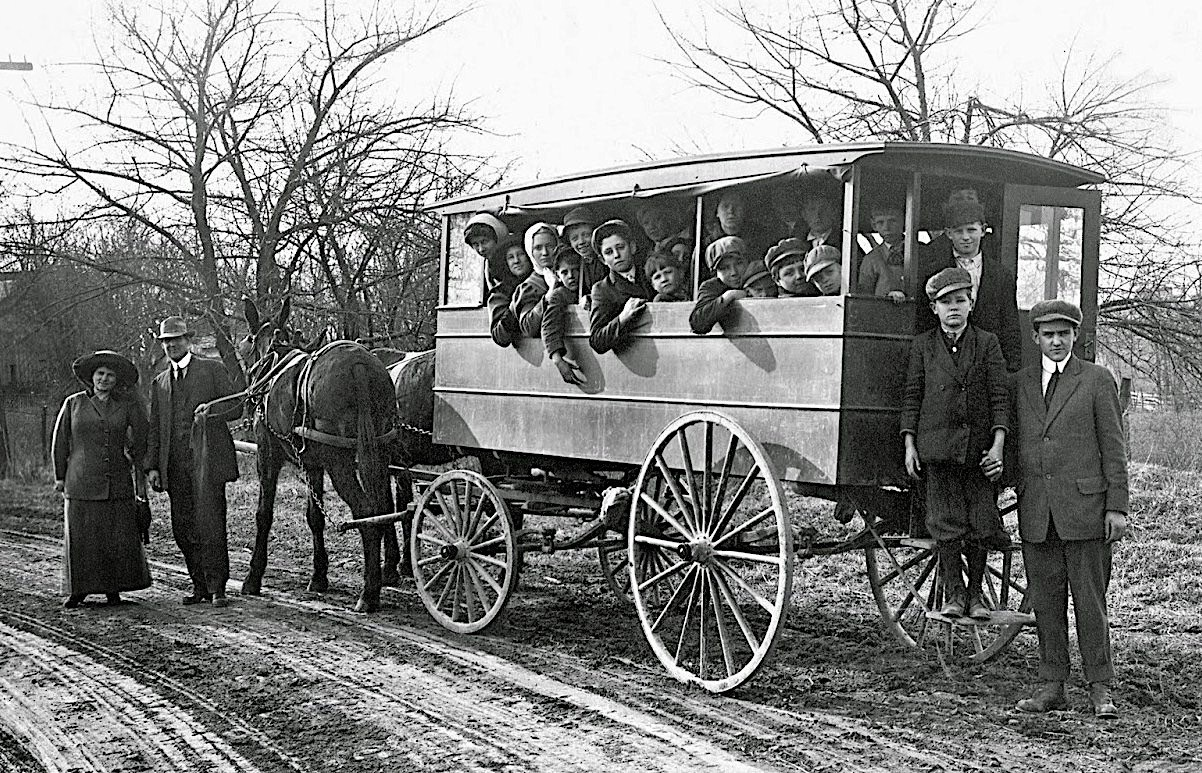
Horse drawn kid hack from the late 1890's, from Fayette County, Kentucky, USA

A kid hack is a horse-drawn vehicle that was used for transporting children to school in the late 19th and early 20th centuries in the United States. The word "hack" (a British term for a horse-drawn cab) is short for hackney carriage. The horse-drawn kid hack is considered to be the precursor to the modern yellow school bus.

Prior to the 1930s, elementary-age students in the rural United States were primarily served by either one-room or two-room schools. For students who lived too far to walk to school, the typical kid hack served all the farms in the area, transporting up to 20 children. Pulled by either a horse or a mule, the vehicle was typically rear-loaded; the design stemmed either from the hack's origins as a cargo wagon or (more deliberately) to avoid frightening the animal(s) in front. The Wayne County Historical Museum in Richmond, Indiana has a restored horse-drawn "kid hack" on display.

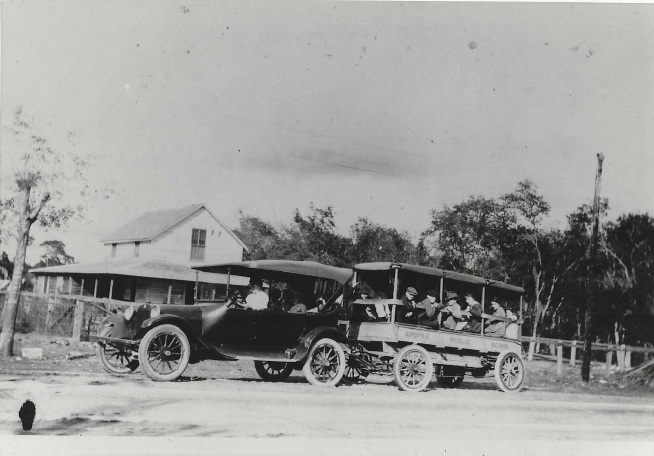
Early automobile towing cart of children to/from Apopka Public School

As early as 1914, kid hacks began to transition to "horseless" pulling power. As motorized trucks came into wider use in rural America, detachable wooden kid hack bodies were made so they could be removed when the truck was needed for other uses. Some examples of these were assembled by the Wayne Works in Richmond, Indiana.

At the end of the 1920s, body manufacturers largely began to transition to construction of bodies permanently mounted on the truck chassis, with the combined vehicle becoming known as a school bus. Initially designed with a steel-sheathed wood frame, assembly transitioned to all-steel construction during the mid-1930s. Today, many yellow school buses retain a design feature from the horse-drawn kid hack, as the rear-mounted entry remains as an emergency exit.

== See also ==
- School bus
- Blue Bird Corporation
- Wayne Corporation
