= National Railroad Construction and Maintenance Association =

- Abbreviation: NRC
- Formation: 1978
- Type: Trade Association
- Legal status: Active
- Purpose: Advocate, public voice, educator, research, lobbying, safety & efficiency of railroad construction industry
- Headquarters: 500 New Jersey Ave NW; Suite 400
- Location(s): Washington, DC; United States
- Region served: North America; Canada
- Members: Railroad contractors, suppliers, and associated professional service firms
- President: Ashley Wieland
- Staff: 4 (DC office)
- Website: http://www.nrcma.org/

The National Railroad Construction and Maintenance Association, Inc. (NRC) is a trade association in the railroad and rail transit construction industry. The NRC is a non-profit trade association, governed by a board of directors and administered by the Washington, D.C., government relations firm, TGA AMS. NRC members include rail construction and maintenance contractors such as Balfour Beatty Rail, Inc.,Colo Railroad Builders, Delta Railroad Construction, Inc., Herzog Contracting, Kiewit Corporation, Loram Maintenance of Way, RailWorks Corporation, and Stacy Witbeck; in addition to supplier companies such as A&K Railroad Materials, Inc., Harsco Rail, L. B. Foster Company, Progress Rail Services, Inc., and Western-Cullen-Hayes, Inc.

The NRC holds an annual conference and exhibition each January, taking place alternating between the East and West Coasts and regularly encompassing more than 1,000 attendees with around 100 exhibitors. Attendees include executives from rail construction contractors, suppliers, and associated professional service firms. Speakers are generally engineering executives from freight railroads, executives and administrators of public rail transit agencies, and a small number of related experts on topics, such as railroad financial analysis and rail-related federal legislative developments. The first NRC Conference took place in 1973 and has been held annually without interruption ever since.

The NRC hosts an annual railroad construction and maintenance equipment auction each spring. In the auction, NRC member companies buy and sell rail construction and maintenance equipment from each other and from railroads that participate. The auctions have ranged in size from 150 to 300 pieces of equipment, with a total value of $400,000 to $750,000. The first NRC-organized auction took place in March 2004, and have been held annually without interruption ever since.

The NRC participates in organizing an annual "Railroad Day on Capitol Hill" event, in cooperation with the lead organizations, the American Short Line and Regional Railroad Association (ASLRRA) and the Association of American Railroads (AAR).

== See also ==
- American Public Transportation Association (APTA)
- American Railway Engineering and Maintenance-of-Way Association (AREMA)
- American Short Line and Regional Railroad Association (ASLRRA)
- Association of American Railroads (AAR)
- Associated General Contractors of America (AGC)
- American Road and Transportation Builders Association (ARTBA)
