= Wayne Corporation =

American bus manufacturer (1837–1995)

- Company type: Private
- Industry: Transportation
- Predecessor: Wayne Works
- Founded: 1837; 189 years ago in Union City, Indiana
- Defunct: 1995; 31 years ago
- Fate: Defunct (bankruptcy)
- Successor: Wayne Wheeled Vehicles
- Headquarters: Richmond, Indiana, United States
- Area served: North America
- Products: Buses: School buses; Transit buses; Second-stage manufacturer: Ambulances; Delivery vans; Professional cars
- Parent: Divco Corporation (1957–1968); Indian Head (1968–1975); Thyssen-Bornemisza (1975–1984)
- Subsidiaries: Welles Corporation (1925–1990); Miller-Meteor (1956–1979); Cotner-Bevington (1964–1980)

The Wayne Corporation was an American manufacturer of buses and other vehicles under the "Wayne" marque. The corporate headquarters were in Richmond, in Wayne County, Indiana. During the mid‐20th century, Wayne served as a leading producer of school buses in North America.

Among innovations introduced by the company were the first application of cutaway van chassis for a school bus and an improvement in structural integrity in bus body construction, involving the use of continuous longitudinal panels to reduce body joints; the design change happened before federal standards required stronger body structures in school buses.

After 1980, Wayne faced difficulty competing in a market with overcapacity. Declaring bankruptcy, the company discontinued operations in 1992 and its assets were liquidated. Later in 1992, the Wayne brand was reorganized as Wayne Wheeled Vehicles, doing business through 1995.

== Overview ==
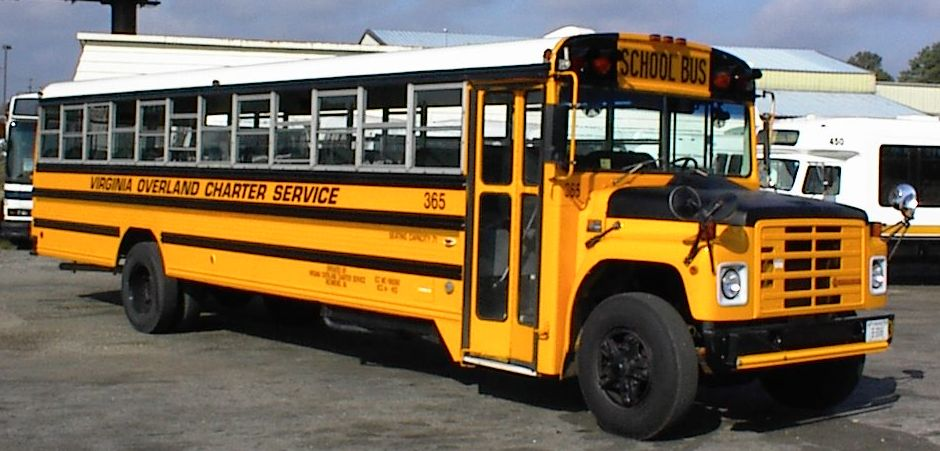
1988 Wayne/International Lifeguard

Beginning in the 19th century, craftsmen in Richmond, Indiana at Wayne Works and its successors built horse-drawn vehicles, including kid hacks, evolving into automobiles and virtually all types of bus bodies during the 20th century. Wayne products eventually included school buses, transit buses, highway coaches, military and shuttle buses, ambulances and trailer buses.

Wayne pioneered the side-mounted guard rails of modern school buses, inboard wheelchair lifts, and high-headroom doors (a special accommodation for mobility-challenged persons requiring head and neck support from above). The company was the first with a school bus based upon a cutaway van chassis, the Wayne Busette, a body design that would set a precedent for small school bus design, more than 40 years after its introduction.

Wayne was known for the "Wayne Lifeguard" structural body design introduced in 1973, which featured continuous interior and exterior longitudinal panels. The body design helped pave the way for U.S. Federal Motor Vehicle Safety Standards (FMVSS) for school buses, most of which became applicable on April 1, 1977.

Through nearly 160 years of existence, Wayne went through several ownership and name changes. From 1955 to 1975 alone, the business underwent periods under the ownership of Divco (as "Divco-Wayne"), Boise Cascade, "Indian Head, Inc.", and the Thyssen-Bornemisza Group.

In 1967, Wayne opened the largest school bus manufacturing facility in the United States adjacent to Interstate 70. During the 1980s, the company struggled against an industry downturn fueled by overcapacity and a difficult market cycle. Following millions of dollars of losses, Wayne Corporation declared bankruptcy in 1992.

During the 1990s, Wayne was briefly reorganized as Wayne Wheeled Vehicles, with the Richmond factory utilized by rival manufacturer Carpenter, building school buses from 1996 until its closure in 2000.

== Early history (1837–1956) ==
=== 1837–1900 ===
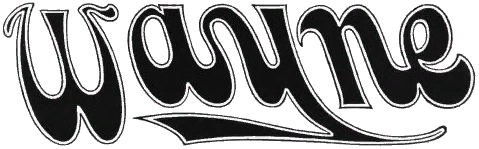
Early Wayne logo

The beginning of Wayne Corporation traces back to 1837 in Dublin, Indiana, as the Witt family set up a foundry. Alongside the initial manufacturing of stoves, the foundry expanded its manufacturing to farm implements. Through the 1840s and 1850s, the foundry would undergo several changes of ownership. In 1868, the company produced its first vehicle, a horse-drawn utility wagon derived from the then-popular Conestoga wagon.

The 1870s saw two major events that would change the company forever. In 1871, Wayne Agricultural Company was founded out of a reorganization of the foundry ownership (deriving its name from Wayne County, Indiana). In 1875, Wayne Agricultural relocated its operations to Richmond, Indiana. In the late 1880s, Wayne Agricultural fell into receivership and was nearly closed. In 1888, the company was reorganized as Wayne Works.

==== Kid hacks ====
Following the closure of Wayne Agricultural in 1888, Wayne Works began focusing its product range on horse-drawn vehicles, including wagons and carriages. In 1892, Wayne Works was commissioned by an Ohio school district to build a wagon designed for student transport. Its "School Car" featured perimeter seating with wooden bench seats. Other wagons at the time adapted for transporting students were referred to as "school hacks","school trucks," or "kid hacks."

=== 1900–1930: From wagons to buses ===
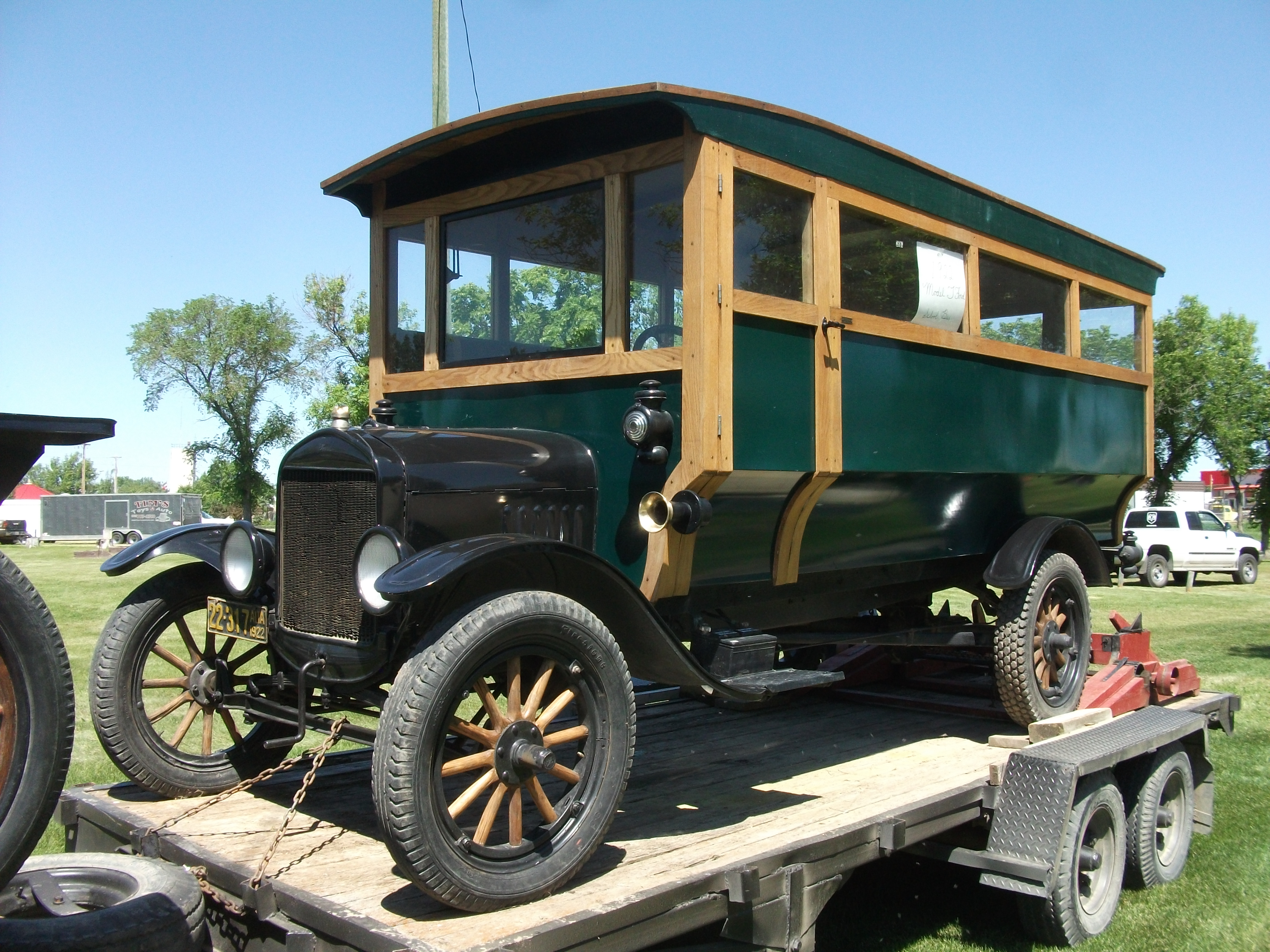
A 1922 Ford Model T kid hack/bus (body manufacturer unknown). By combining the kid hack wagon body with an automotive chassis, Wayne Works helped create the school bus in its earliest form.

In 1902, Wayne Works was forced to completely rebuild after a fire destroyed the factory. Moving away from farm implements, the company began a transition towards the manufacturing of automobile bodies. In addition, the company began production of complete automobiles, with the Richmond built between 1901 and 1917.

In 1922, Wayne introduced the Touring Home, a recreational vehicle derived from its bus body. By 1927, Wayne introduced the use of steel for its external body panels combined with a wood internal frame.

==== First buses ====
In the 1910s, Wayne chose to become a body manufacturer for truck chassis (such as the Ford Model T). In 1914, alongside a line of commercial truck bodies, the company introduced its first motorized "School Car", its first school bus mounted on an automotive chassis. In the vehicle bodies for school transportation that the company produced during this era, passengers sat on perimeter seating, facing the sides rather than the front of the bus. In place of wooden benches, the 1914 School Car was fitted with padded seats.

Entry and egress was through a door at the rear, a design first utilized from the days of wagons to avoid startling the horses. This feature was retained, becoming the rear emergency exit seen on the buses of today; the primary mode of ingress/egress is now through a curbside door.

Following World War I, Wayne Works began to produce the School Car in large numbers. Alongside changes in education funding and school modernization, the motorized school bus was a contributing factor in the decline of rural one-room schools in United States. Although fewer children lived within walking distance of school, school systems consisted of fewer but larger multi-room schools.

=== 1930s: Safety innovations ===
In 1930, Wayne Works became the first manufacturer to replace steel-sheathed bodies with full-steel construction, including the internal body frame. Initially offered as an option, the all-steel body became standard in 1933. In 1933, Wayne became the first manufacturer to offer an all-steel body with safety glass windows. In addition, the company began to phase in the heavy-duty reinforced side rails as n added safety feature on school buses, known as "collision rails" or "guard rails".

For 1936, Wayne redesigned its school bus body, making it sectional, allowing a customer to add or remove sections for repair or change capacity. In 1937, the company produced its largest school bus, seating 115 students. In 1938, Wayne Works introduced its first forward-control school bus, offered as a second-party conversion on its conventional-chassis body. In contrast to later front-engine buses, the driver sat on top of the front axle (instead of before the front axle).

=== 1940s: Production transition ===
A "Galloping Goose", which is a railbus constructed from a 1945 Wayne bus body (with a 1925 Pierce-Arrow engine)

==== World War II production ====
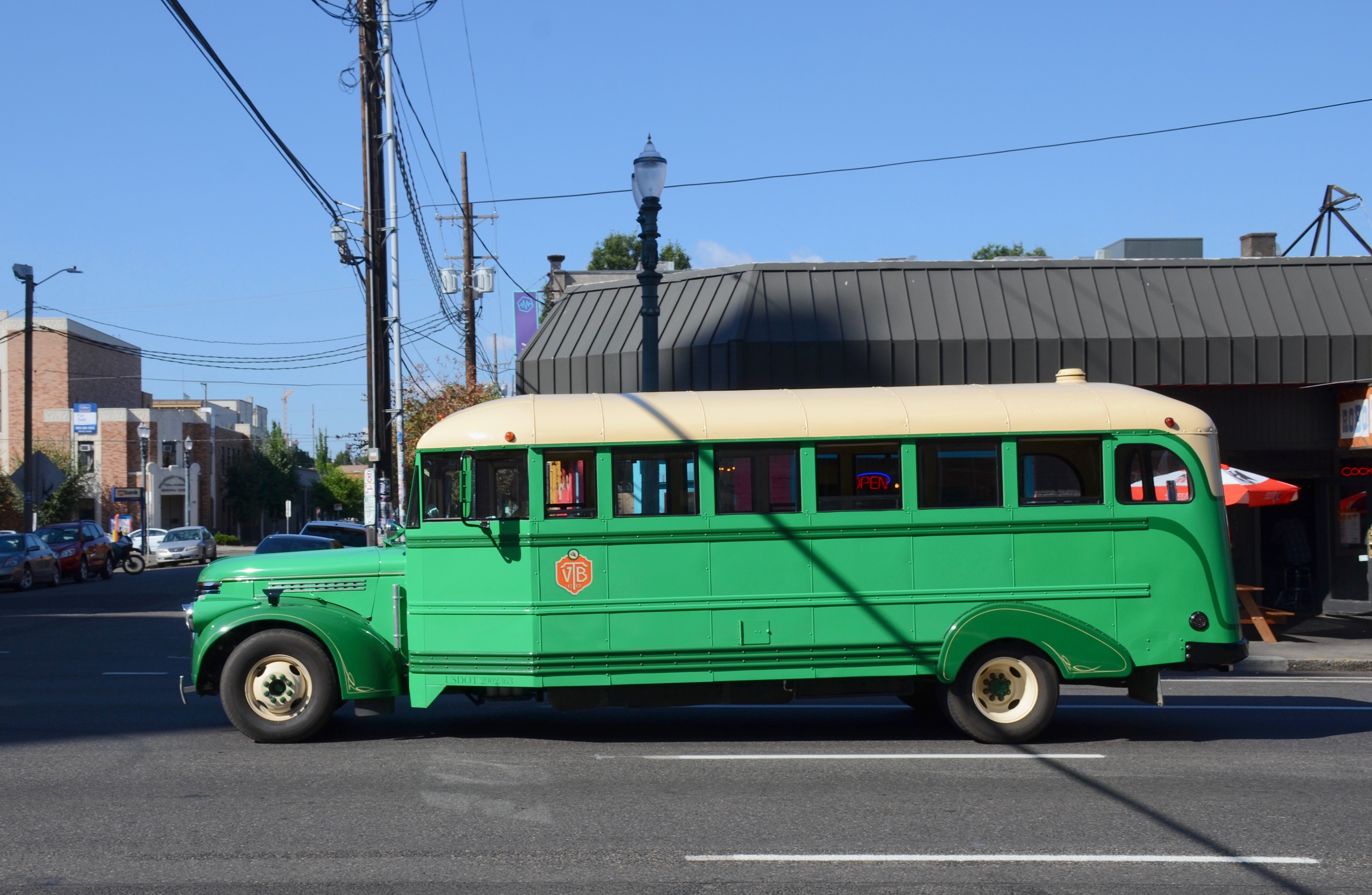
A former school bus that was built by Wayne in 1945

For World War II, as with other school bus manufacturers, Wayne Works retooled as a military supplier for the Armed Forces. From 1942 to 1945, Wayne would produce 22,857 ambulance bodies for the Dodge WC-54 4x4 chassis. The military also were supplied with other vehicles from the company, including mobile machine shops and buses. Along with conventional-chassis buses, Wayne produced trailer buses pulled by a semi-tractor; the latter buses could transport up to 150 passengers.

To conserve steel for war use, Wayne Works and other manufacturers reverted from all-steel construction to building some bus bodies with wooden components during World War II. The company also did some reconstruction on older buses and trucks to extend their lives during the war years, as did other bus body manufacturers. In 1944, as the end of World War II approached, Wayne returned to building all-steel bodies.

==== Post-war era ====
Following World War II, Wayne Works began to adapt for new markets for its vehicles. In 1948, Wayne entered a joint venture with Crown Coach to distribute a separate bus; the joint venture resulted in Crown becoming the West Coast distributor for Wayne. The same year, Welles Corporation of Windsor, Ontario became the sole Canadian distributor of Wayne Works school buses. Named for Halsey V. Welles (who founded H. V. Welles Ltd. in 1925), Welles Corporation was first established as Warford Corp. of Canada to distribute Warford transmissions.

=== 1950–1956: End of Wayne Works ===
In late 1950, Wayne Works changed hands, as the Jeffery Ives Corporation acquired Wayne Works from the Clements family, involved with the company ownership since 1897.

For 1952, the company introduced a redesigned bus body, introducing wraparound rear windows and an optional wraparound windshield.

In the mid-1950s, Wayne expanded beyond bus manufacturing, as it acquired two manufacturers of professional cars. In 1954, the company acquired Meteor Motor Car and A.J. Miller Company in 1956, merging them together as Miller-Meteor.

In 1956, Newton Glekel began negotiations with Divco to undergo a merger with Wayne Works. After having inspected the Richmond factory for a potential 1949 sale, the New York-based investor retained interest. At the time in the United States, Wayne controlled a 25% share of school bus manufacturing with Miller-Meteor controlling a 50% share of professional car manufacturing.

== Divco-Wayne Corporation (1956–1968) ==
In November 1956, under the leadership of Newton Glekel, a real estate investor from New York, completed a merger of Divco and Wayne Works, with Divco acquiring the assets of Wayne; a 26% share was owned by the law firm owned by Glekel. Under the merger, Wayne began business as the Divco-Wayne Corporation; by 1961, all management of the merged company came from Wayne, with Glekel serving as president.

=== Divco-Wayne structure ===
Following the merger, Divco-Wayne expanded into a manufacturing conglomerate; beyond its bus, professional car, and truck product lines, Divco-Wayne expanded into the manufacturing of mobile homes, recreational vehicles, and ambulances. Although Divco would continue the manufacturing of its namesake delivery vehicles, nearly all vehicle manufacturing was completed through Wayne and its professional car subsidiaries.

==== Delivery vehicles (Divco) ====
Divco stands for Detroit Industrial Vehicles COmpany. Founded in 1926, Divco was known for its pioneering delivery vehicles, with many examples built as milk trucks. At the time of the Divco-Wayne merger, 75% of milk delivery vehicles sold in the United States were manufactured by Divco.

First built in 1926, Divco produced its delivery trucks until 1986; only the Volkswagen Beetle remained in production under a single generation for longer. Divco trucks have become popular collectible vehicles today.

Following the 1956 merger, Divco-Wayne continued manufacturing of Divco trucks in its Detroit facility. From 1959 to 1961, the company produced the Divco Dividend bus, a Divco truck modified with seats and windows from Wayne buses.

In 1967, Divco-Wayne sold off its namesake truck manufacturing arm to air conditioning manufacturer Transairco. As part of the sale, Transairco shifted manufacturing of Divco trucks in 1969 from Detroit to Delaware, Ohio, lasting until 1986.

Divco vehicles

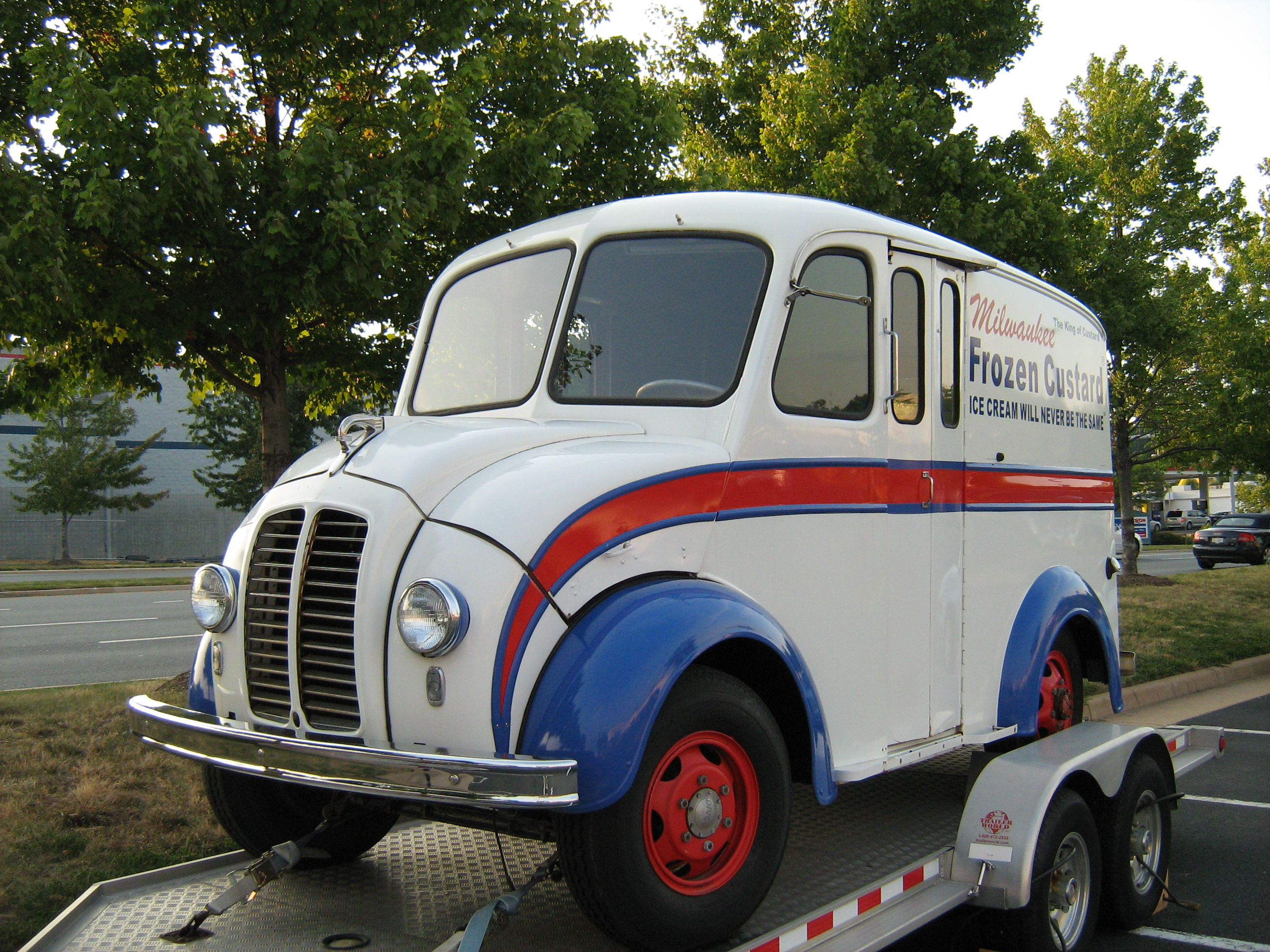
Divco milk delivery truck (vintage unknown)

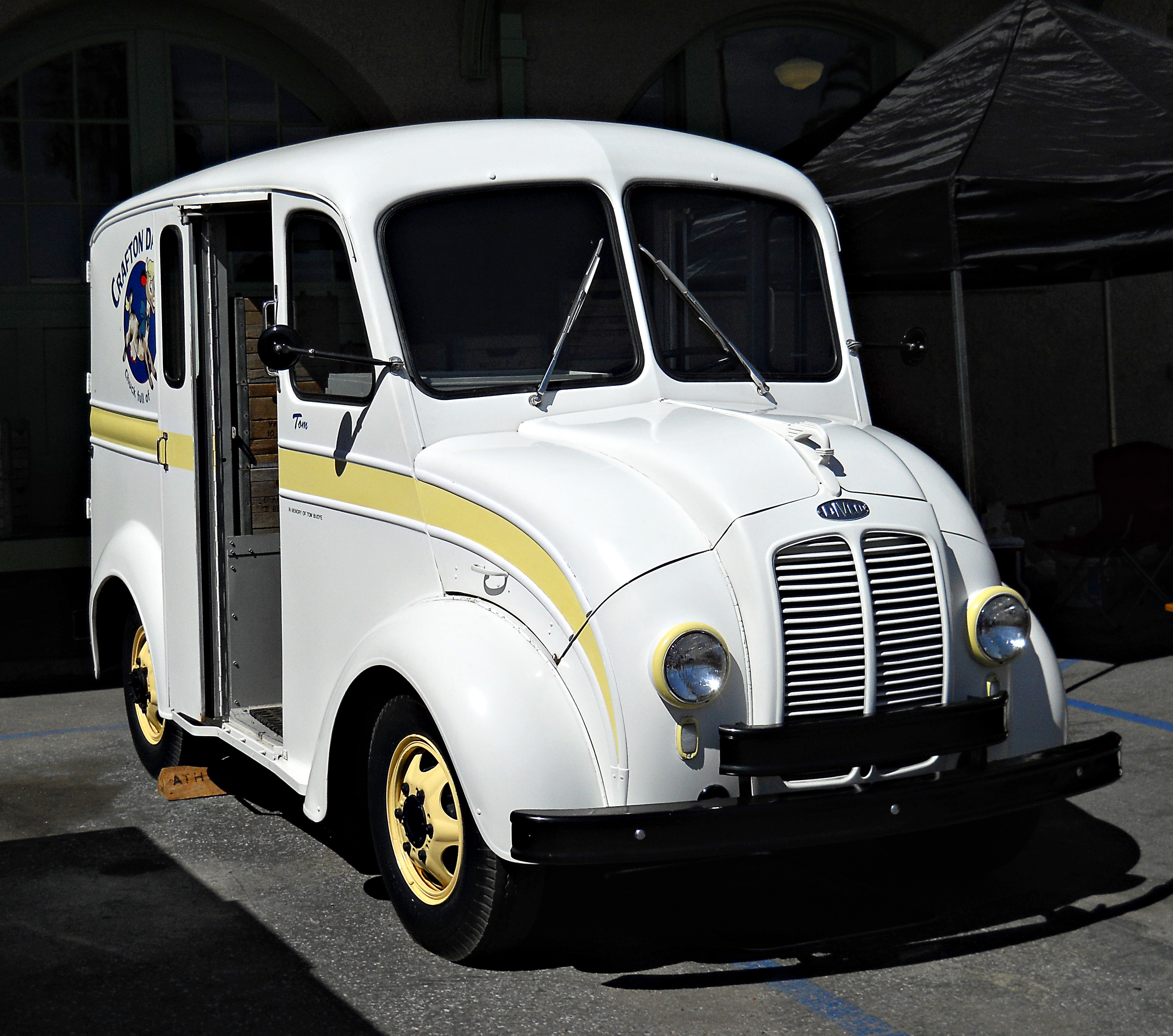
Divco dairy truck

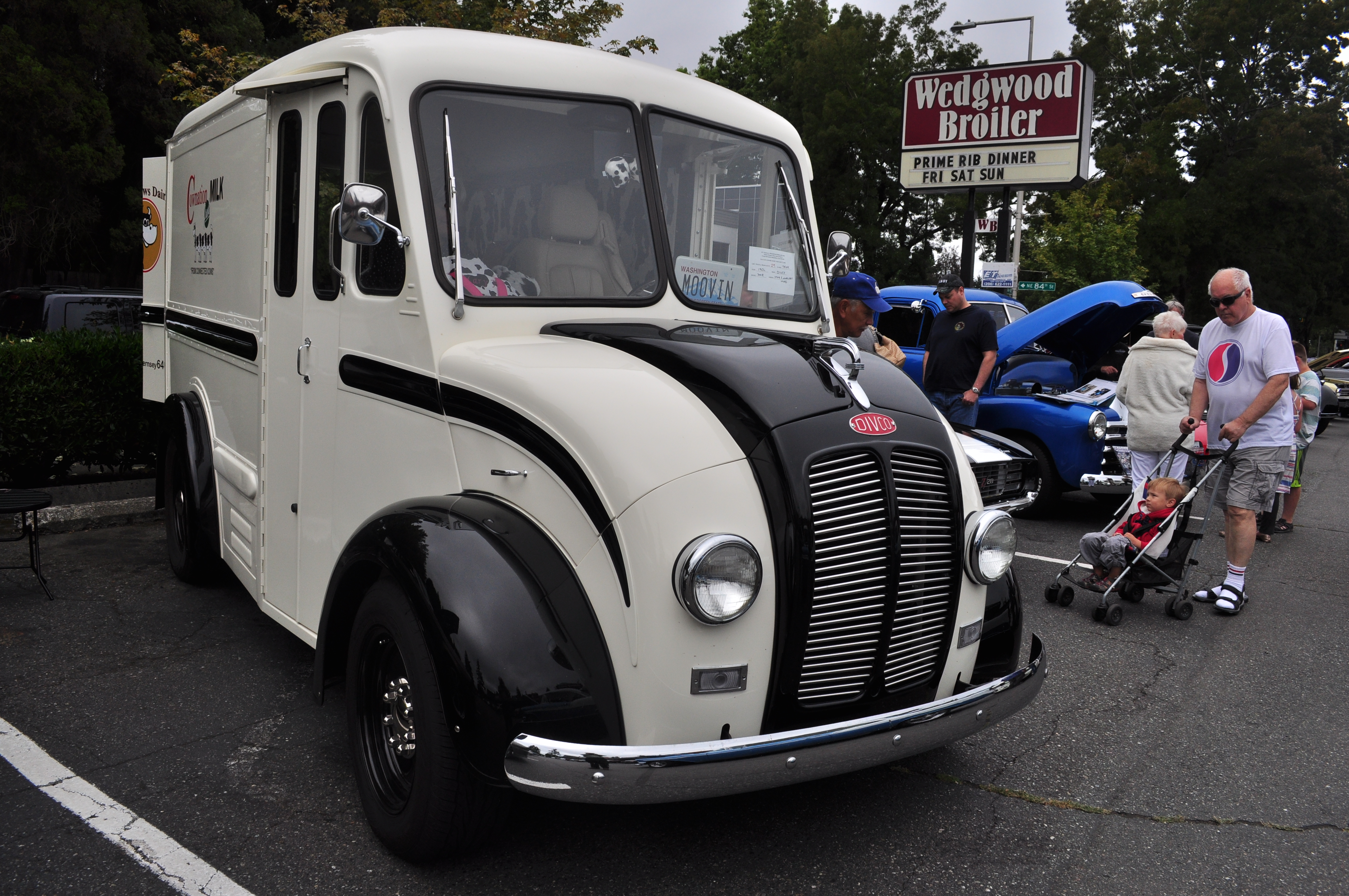
1962 Divco delivery truck

==== Bus manufacturing (Wayne) ====
As Wayne started out as the Wayne Agricultural Works in the 19th century, all manufacturing had been centralized at its facility in Richmond, Indiana. Most bus bodies consisted of in-house manufactured parts and purchased components manufactured by others, combined into bus bodies in assembly operations. Thus, the major two functions of the Richmond, Indiana, plant were manufacturing of parts, and assembly. Wayne bus bodies were also assembled at multiple locations of truck body dealers around the US and at a Canadian assembly plant, Welles, Ltd., in Windsor, Ontario. Kits were also shipped overseas even after all North American assembly was eventually centralized in Richmond, Indiana, and Windsor, Ontario, in the early 1960s.

During the earlier years of the school bus industry, the factory manufactured most of the parts used to assemble a bus body, but it was customary for these to be shipped unassembled to body dealers around the United States and Canada, for assembly onto an incomplete truck chassis. Gradually, as highway transportation of completed buses became more practical, and school bus bodies became more sophisticated, the assembly of complete bodies onto truck chassis in the United States and Canada became centralized at locations owned by the body companies. The companies often continued to ship "kits" overseas.

By the mid-1960s, several other body companies (notably Blue Bird Body Company and Perley A. Thomas Car Works) maintained assembly plants at multiple locations. Instead of establishing multiple assembly points in the U.S., Wayne chose to replace the overcrowded and aged Wayne Works facility on E Street near downtown Richmond with a single new plant large enough to handle both manufacturing and assembly for United States production. Due primarily to Canadian import tariffs, the separate Canadian assembly plant (Welles, Ltd.) had been established and was maintained for Canadian production. In 1963, Divco-Wayne acquired Welles entirely, making it a subsidiary of the company.

==== Professional cars ====
Divco-Wayne Corporation acquired two professional car manufacturers, Miller-Meteor and Cotner-Bevington. Both companies produced funeral cars and ambulances.

==== Miller-Meteor ====
Wayne Works purchased Meteor Motor Car Company in Piqua, Ohio, in 1954. Meteor built professional cars, such as limousines and ambulances.

In 1956, Wayne acquired A.J. Miller's professional car building company of Bellefontaine, Ohio. The A.J. Miller Company had begun in 1853 by making horse carriages and then started making automobiles in the early part of the 20th century. However, the small company found it could not compete in the general market with the larger automobile makers, so they began specializing in hearses and ambulances. Over the years the Miller hearses became known and used throughout the world. The Miller Co. was combined with Wayne's existing professional car subsidiary, Meteor Motor Car Company, forming the new Miller-Meteor (M-M) division of Wayne.

Professional car manufacturers Miller and Meteor, newly combined as Miller-Meteor, were brought into the fold of Divco-Wayne as the newly formed conglomerate was developing its opportunities in this field. Although the recently combined Miller-Meteor company was initially based at Bellefontaine, Ohio, originally the home of the A.J. Miller Company, under Divco-Wayne ownership, it was later relocated to Piqua, Ohio, Meteor's old hometown nearby.

Ecto-1, the vehicle used by the protagonists in the 1984 film Ghostbusters and its 1989, 2021 and 2024 sequels, is a 1959 Cadillac fitted with a Miller-Meteor ambulance body.

==== Cotner-Bevington ====
Divco-Wayne acquired Cotner-Bevington Coach Company (C-B) in 1965. Founded as Comet Coach Company, the coachbuilder sold the rights in 1959 to the "Comet" name" to Ford Motor Company (which sought to use it for the Lincoln-Mercury Division); in 1960, the Mercury Comet was introduced. In response, Comet Coach renamed itself Cotner-Bevington Coach Company, taking on the names of its two founders; the company also relocated from Memphis, Tennessee, a few miles north to Blytheville, Arkansas.

At the time of its acquisition by Divco-Wayne, Cotner-Bevington specialized primarily in ambulances based on Oldsmobile commercial chassis.

In 1968, Wayne began production of truck-based ambulances, using the Cotner-Bevington facilities. For 1968, the "Sentinel" (based on the Chevrolet Suburban) was introduced, expanding to the "Vanguard" (based on the Chevrolet Van) in 1971, and "Medicruiser" (based on Dodge Ram Van) in 1973. The Sentinel received a headroom increase for 1971, but were only built through the 1972 model year. After that, the Sentinel brand name was used on Wayne's line of Type I (pickup chassis) modular ambulances. Body shells were produced at the Richmond, Indiana, bus plant for Care-O-Van ambulance units, based upon cutaway chassis and Wayne Busette bodies.

In 1973, Wayne truck-based ambulance production moved to Piqua, Ohio, home to Miller-Meteor. C-B stayed in business through the 1975 model year, building only on Oldsmobile commercial chassis after 1964; all other production would become truck-based ambulances. In 1967, the company became the first coachbuilder to standardize air conditioning on all vehicles produced.

Divco-Wayne professional cars

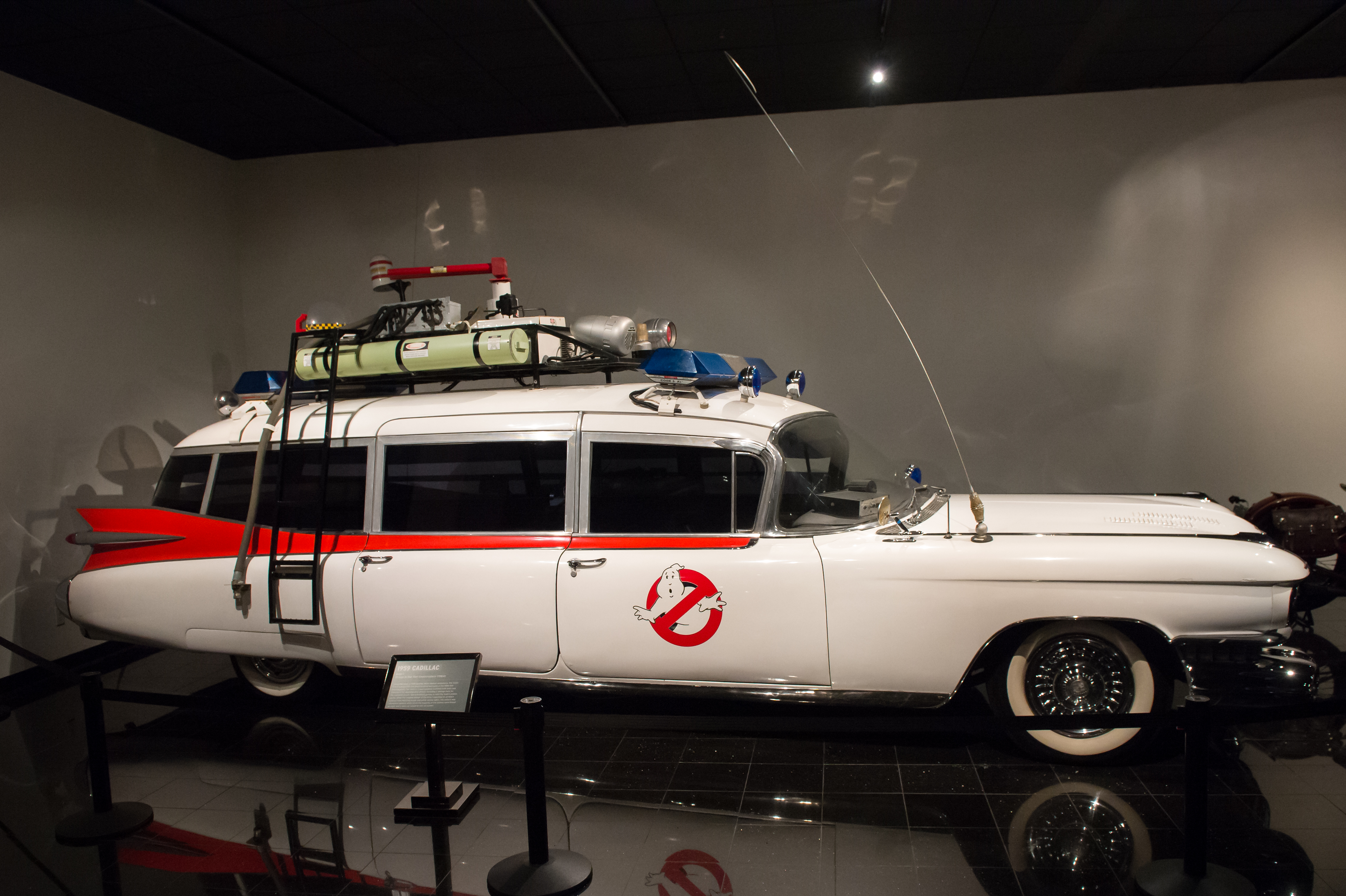
The 1959 Cadillac Miller-Meteor Futura Duplex Ambulance "Ectomobile" that was used in the Ghostbusters films.

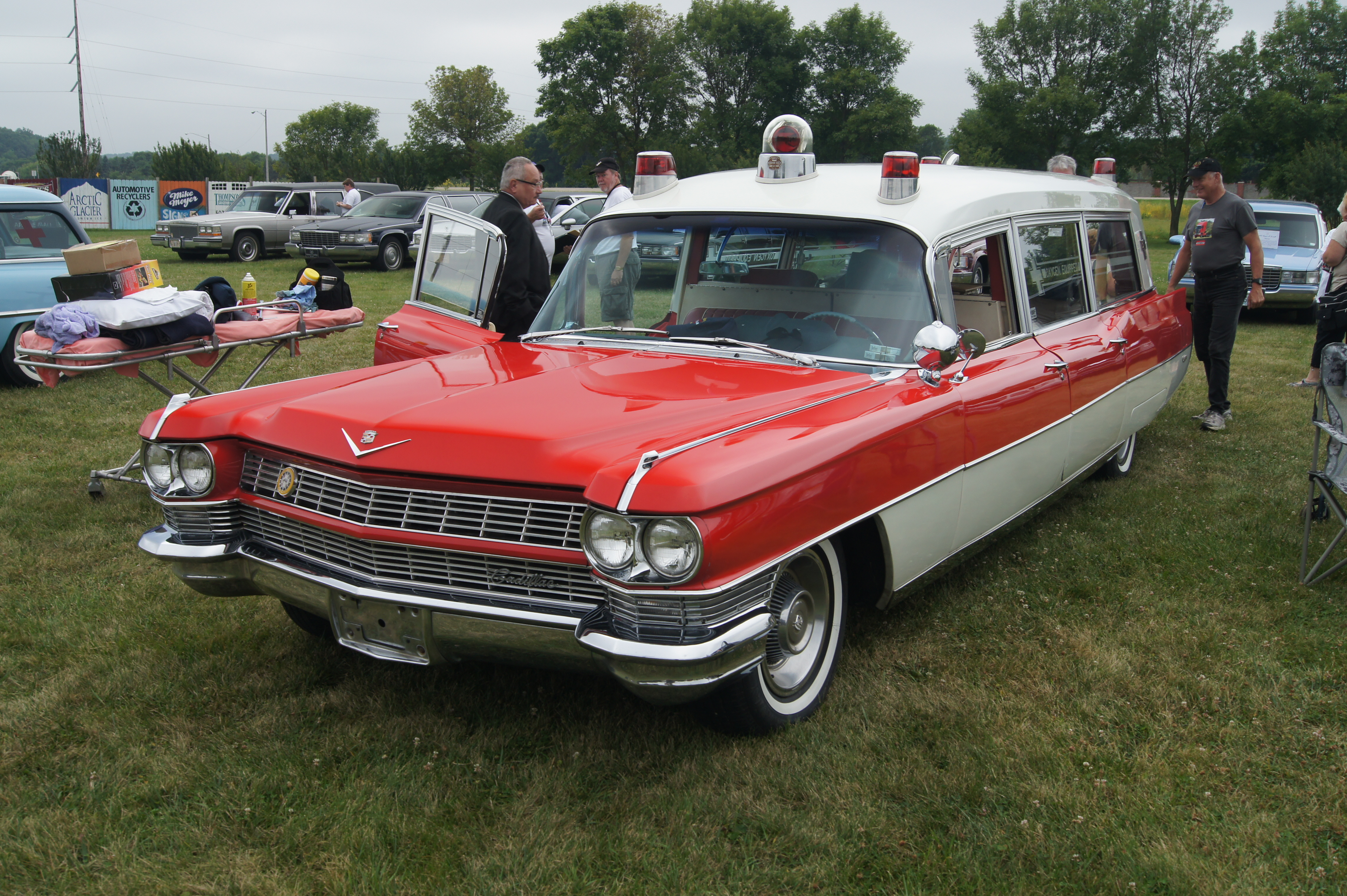
1964 Cadillac ambulance with Miller-Meteor body.

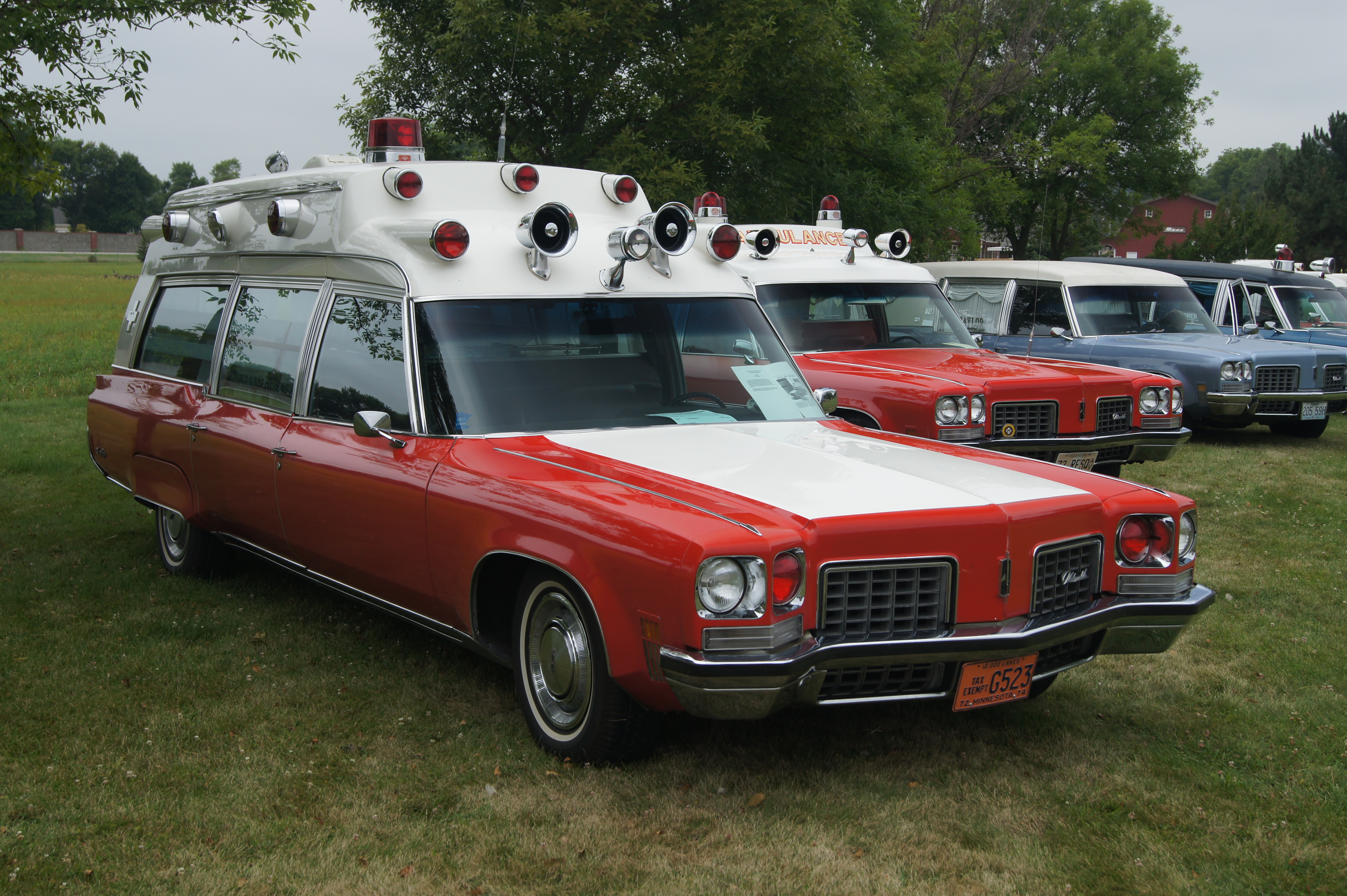
1972 Oldsmobile 98 ambulance (Cotner-Bevington body)

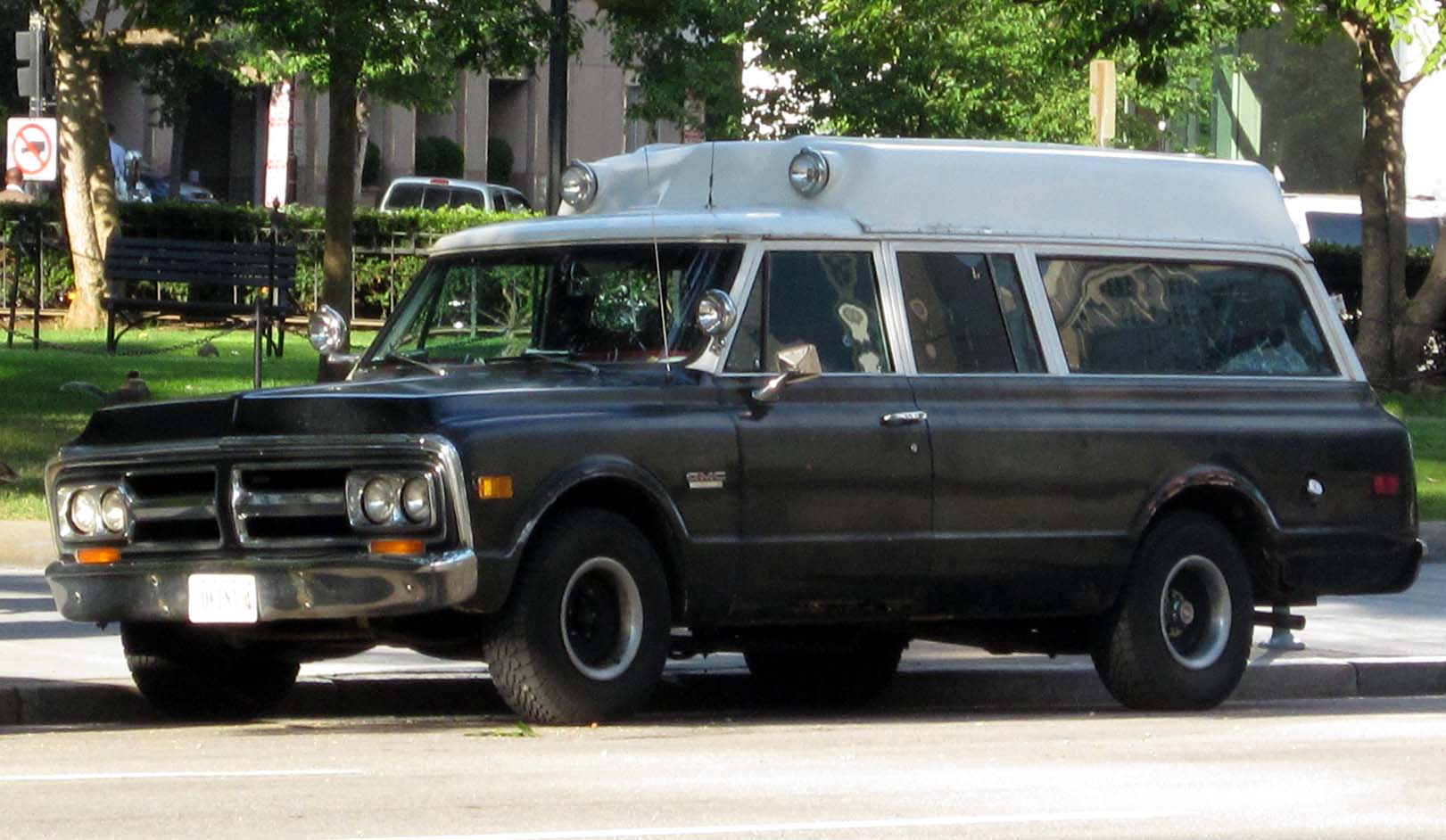
Wayne Sentinel ambulance (GMC C20 Suburban 1969–1972)

==== Non-automotive divisions ====
Divco-Wayne Corporation manufactured housing brands included Kozy, Elcar, Star, and National. The Divco-Wayne conglomerate also had a financial arm, Divco-Wayne Acceptance Corporation, which was also known as Divco-Wayne Financial, Wayne Acceptance or Financial Corporation and Wayne Financial Sales Corporation.

From 1958 to 1959, the company owned Divco-Wayne Electronics. In a $1.5 million purchase of the Electronics Division of Gruen Watch Company of Cincinnati, Ohio, Divco-Wayne sought to enter the aerospace technology segment. After poor results, the Electronics Division was sold off.

==== Distribution network ====
Some Wayne dealerships were operated by school bus contractors. ARA Transportation and Laidlaw were the largest. Others included Bus and Bodies of Plaistow, New Hampshire, Town & Country Transportation of Warren, Rhode Island, Rohrer of Duncannon, Pennsylvania, Virginia Overland Transportation of Richmond, Virginia, and School Bus Services of Shawnee Mission, Kansas. These school bus contractors found having a dealership provided both a source and an input to product design at Wayne, as well as a natural outlet for sale of surplus equipment at the end of contract periods.

Wayne Export was a Divco-Wayne division which specialized in selling disassembled Wayne bodies knock-down kits (CKDs) outside North America. By 1957, Wayne bus bodies were in use in 60 different countries.

In 1963, Wayne licensed the Spanish S.A. Bosuga to build in Barcelona coach bodies based on Wayne's technology and designs. These were marketed as Bosuga Wayne, utilizing mainly Pegaso and Barreiros-AEC chassis. The venture was short-lived since the Spanish market for coach bodies was crowded.

=== Factory relocation ===
As early as 1964, Divco-Wayne started plans for the construction of a new plant. In need for over 100 acres of land to build a factory, the company purchased a site in Florence, Kentucky. In response, $450,000 was raised by the community of Richmond and local UAW to persuade the company to build on a 100-acre parcel of land outside of the city, located near the intersection of Interstate 70 and US 35 northwest of the city.

In late 1964, construction began on the new 550,000 square feet (51,000 m^{2}) facility, at a cost of $3.5 million. As it opened at the beginning of 1967, the new Richmond factory included assembly and manufacturing for all Wayne product lines under one roof, including steel manufacturing presses, rust-proofing equipment, and paint booths. Although export buses would remain shipped in CKD form (to ease shipping), the new factory allowed all buses to leave the factory fully assembled and driveable.

=== Divco-Wayne breakup ===
At the end of 1966, Divco was put up for sale and sold to Transairco. At the beginning of 1967, Newton Glekel put the entirety of Divco-Wayne Corporation up for sale.

After several offers, the company was sold for $47.1 million in January 1968 to Boise Cascade, a wood-products manufacturer. As Boise Cascade had sought out Divco-Wayne for its manufactured-housing division, Wayne Corporation was resold in October 1968 for $15 million to Indian Head, Inc., a textile conglomerate. The sale included Wayne Corporation and its transportation-segment subsidiaries: Welles, Miller-Meteor, and Cotner-Bevington.

== Wayne Corporation (1968–1992) ==
=== Indian Head ownership (1968–1975) ===
Logo used under ownership of Indian Head Inc.

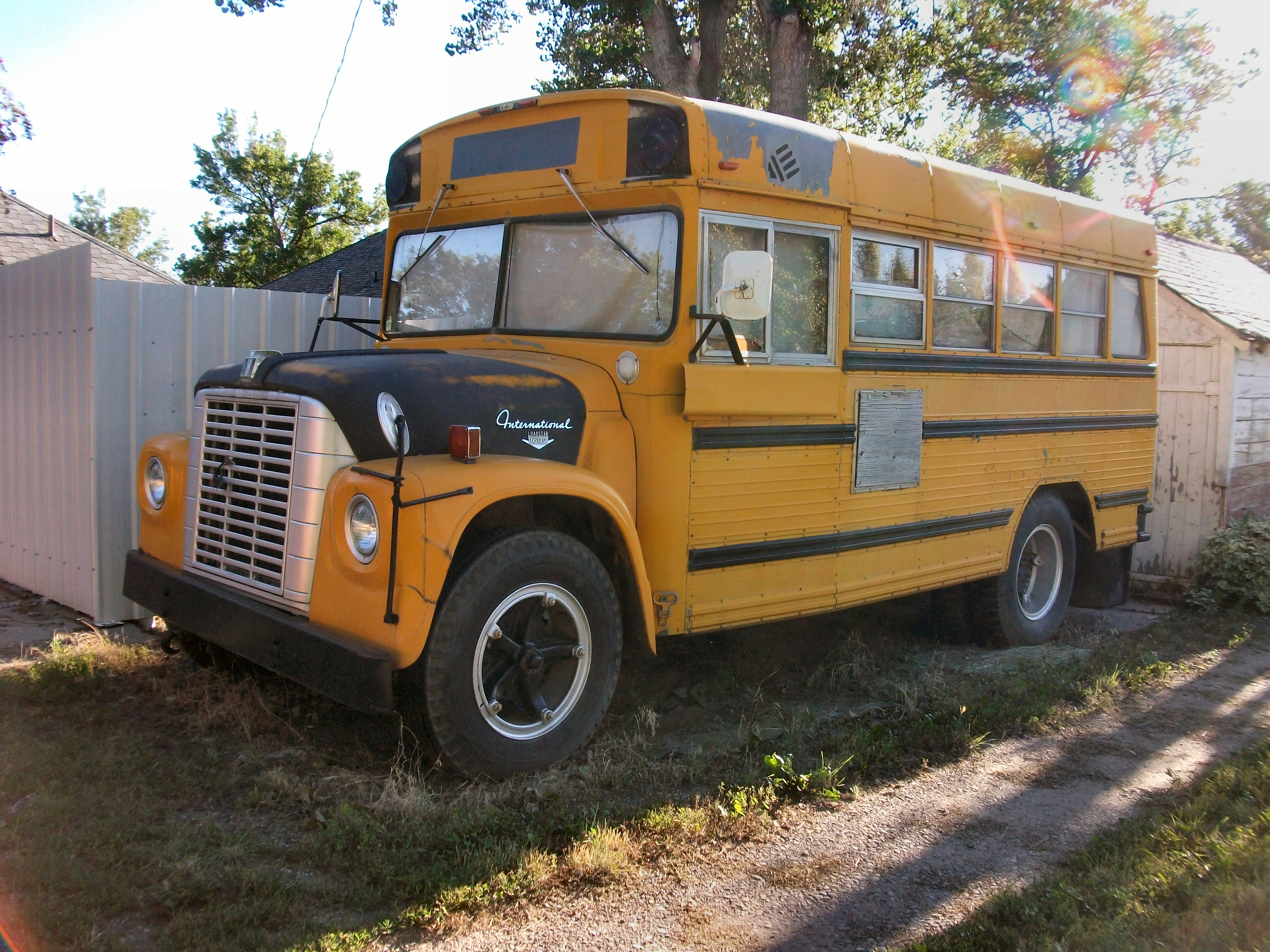
1969-1975 Wayne/International school bus (retired)

Divco-Wayne had formed a union and had expanded into a moderate sized-conglomerate, with all facilities basically within 500 miles (800 km) of Wayne's Richmond, Indiana base. In contrast, Indian Head was already a large and diversified corporate conglomerate when it purchased Wayne Corporation and its subsidiaries in 1968. Indian Head Inc. acquired Wayne Corp., which its history recorded as "maker of school buses, ambulances, hearses, professional cars" from Divco-Wayne.

==== New-generation buses ====
The late 1960s and early 1970s led to the development of new platforms suitable for use for small school buses. Additionally, to improve the basic structural integrity of full-size school buses, Wayne engineers went back to the drawing board and changed how school buses were constructed with an all-new body design.

===== Small buses: Papoose and Busette =====
In the early 1970s, the step van was principal platform for school buses smaller than conventional types but with more than 4 wheels. Essentially developed as a newer, larger generation of the Divco truck or IHC Metro van, the step van chassis was built with dual rear wheels and shipped to a body manufacturer with a bare frame. Often referred to as a "P-chassis", step-van chassis were produced by both Ford or General Motors.

In 1969, Carpenter Body Works became the first company to build a school bus on a P-chassis, named the Cadet. In 1970, Wayne developed its own vehicle line for a Chevrolet P-chassis, named the Wayne Papoose. The front bodywork of the Papoose was designed in an effort to maximize forward visibility. The front bodywork also maximized the use of flat glass and flat-paneled sheetmetal. Described by some observers as "severe" in its appearance, the Papoose earned other nicknames even less kind.

Although the Papoose failed to gain ground in the school bus segment and was discontinued in 1973, other school bus manufacturers would develop buses of a similar configuration by the end of the 1970s, with the Blue Bird Mini Bird and Carpenter Cadet remaining in production into the late 1990s.

Following the failure of the Papoose, Wayne chose to develop an even smaller school bus, becoming the first manufacturer to adapt a cutaway van chassis for school bus use. For 1973, the Busette was introduced, using Chevrolet/GMC and Dodge chassis. Prior to the Busette, small school buses were conversions of full-size vans or large SUVs (such as the Chevrolet Suburban or International Travelall). Using a cutaway chassis, the Busette placed a purpose-built bus body on a dual rear-wheel chassis; the wider rear axle provided an extra margin of stability and capability over converted passenger vehicles.

Following its introduction, the Busette (and its Transette commercial variant) set a design precedent for the configuration of all small buses, not just school buses. The Busette and Transette also were among the first small buses to be fitted with wheelchair lifts.

===== Full-size buses: Lifeguard =====
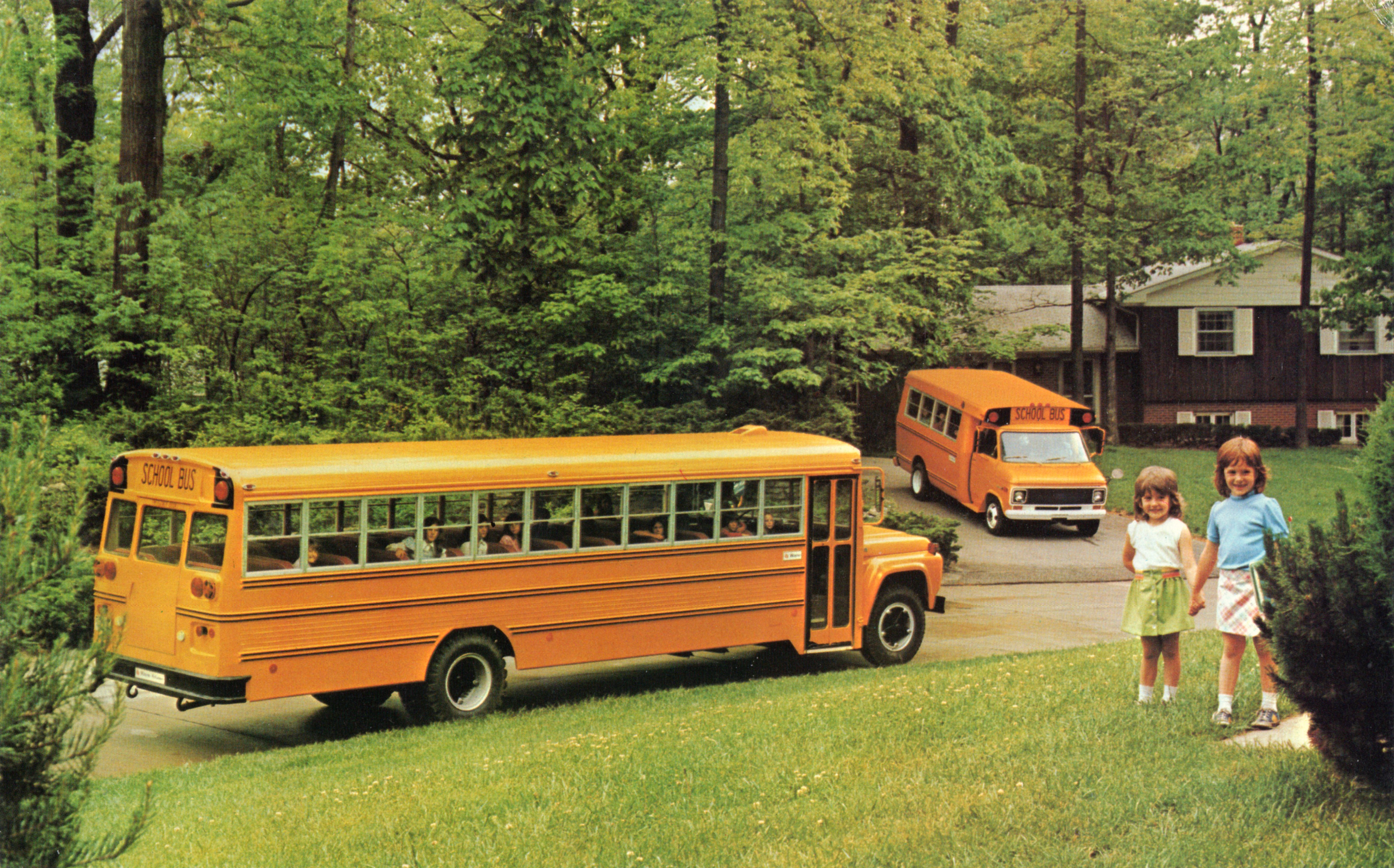
1976 photograph of Wayne Lifeguard (foreground) and Wayne Busette school buses.

In the early 1930s, Wayne was one of the first school bus manufacturers to introduce guard rails and all-metal construction into school bus design. While safer than wooden body construction, riveted metal body panels posed problems of their own; in a crash, a weak point of the body was identified as the joints where body panels were fastened together.

In 1967, safety engineers of Ward Body Works of Conway, Arkansas (a competing bus manufacturer) subjected one of their school bus bodies to a multiple roll test and noted the separation at the joints. Ward noted that many of their competitors were using far fewer rivets and fasteners. This resulted in new attention by all manufacturers to the number and quality of fasteners.

As opposed to simply adding more fasteners, Wayne engineers proposed eliminating the body panel joints entirely; essentially, the entire side of the bus would have to be formed from a single piece of metal. The roof panel would be manufactured in the same fashion: one piece, cut to length. Fasteners would only be needed for the interior structure, the guardrails, and at the rear of the bus.

In 1973, Wayne introduced the new design, branded the Lifeguard. Although Wayne needed specialized equipment to manufacture the Lifeguard's body panels, the design also reduced overall body weight and man-hours required for assembly.

==== Indian Head and Thyssen ====
In 1973, Indian Head established a joint business venture with Thyssen-Bornemisza Group N.V., a Dutch holding company. In 1975, the rest of Indian Head Industries was sold to (and folded into) Thyssen-Bornemisza, a conglomerate based in Monaco, which was owned by one man: Baron Hans Heinrich (Heini) Thyssen-Bornemisza.

=== Thyssen-Bornemisza ownership (1975–1984) ===
Thyssen spent much of the next 8–10 years selling off or closing its North American investments. In the late 1970s and early 1980s, the portions of Thyssen-Bornemisza which formed the Wayne Corporation went through a period of decline. By 1980, Wayne existed solely as a bus manufacturer in a segment itself struggling to survive.

In 1975, when the ownership of Wayne Corporation shifted from Indian Head to Thyssen, Wayne was one of six major school bus body builders in the United States. Wayne apparently enjoyed some profitable years in the late 1970s, buoyed by sales of its Busette and Transette product lines. By 1980, the company was one of the "Big Six" school bus body manufacturing companies in the United States, competing with Blue Bird Body Company, Carpenter Body Works, Superior Coach Company, Thomas Built Buses, Inc., and Ward Body Works; the Big Six were joined by Crown Coach Corporation and Gillig Bros., manufacturers which traded primarily on the West Coast.

A downturn in North American school bus purchase volumes began in the late 1970s as the children of the Baby Boom completed their elementary and secondary educations. Bidding competition for reduced volumes became devastating to profits and even liquidity.

==== Closure of professional car manufacturing ====
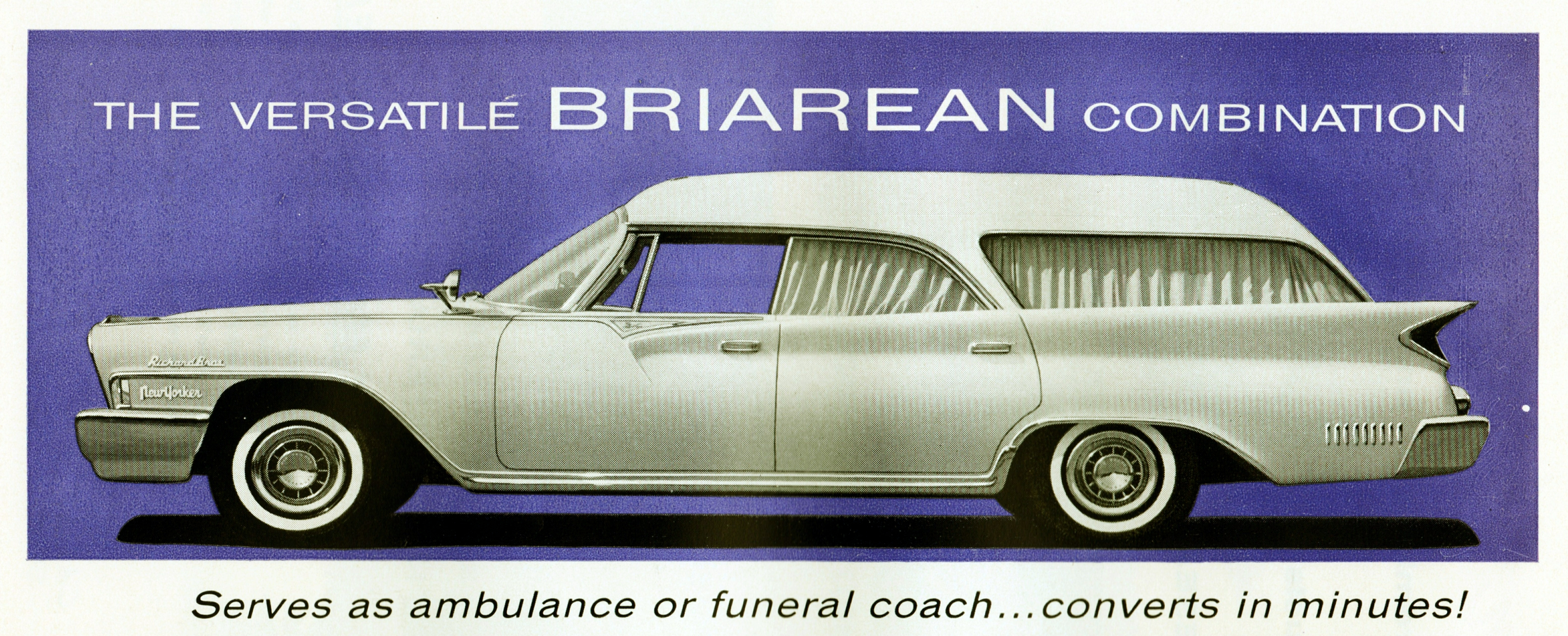
Combination car

The professional car industry was negatively and profoundly impacted by three factors in the late 1970s. At the time, many units served as both ambulances and funeral vehicles, called "combinations." Combinations disappeared from general service in the late 1970s. The downsizing of America's biggest luxury cars, beginning with the 1977 model year, forced major changes upon professional car builders, who were dependent upon car frames purchased from General Motors and Ford Motor Company to begin their conversion processes.

Cotner-Bevington was closed in 1975, with Thyssen selling off its assets; Miller-Meteor was closed at the end of 1979.

Downsizing

Alongside the rest of the full-size Cadillac product model line, the Cadillac commercial chassis was downsized for 1977 to reduce vehicle weight and fuel consumption. The Cadillac Division built 1,299 commercial chassis for 1977; of that total, only 21 Lifeliner Cadillac ambulances were manufactured by Wayne's Miller-Meteor subsidiary.

For 1978, Cadillac's commercial chassis production further declined to only 852 units; Miller-Meteor received orders for only 4 ambulances. There were no 1979 Miller-Meteor ambulances. On December 13, 1979, the company, with roots tracing back to 1853, closed its doors. The company laid-off 252 employees and terminated the contracts of their 34 North American distributors. By the late 1970s, as the situation became critical, Wayne Corporation, the parent of M-M and C-B, and Wayne's Thyssen owners chose not to invest heavily in either firm as would have been required in the uncertain futures of the diverging professional car and ambulance building industries. There were no buyers for either subsidiary as a going business. In 1980, Cotner-Bevington ambulance product line was sold to Gene Knisley, owner of Mid-Continent Conversion Co., which was an ambulance and medicar builder in Kansas City, Missouri. The C-B plant in Blytheville, Arkansas was closed.

A few years later, the rights to the Miller-Meteor name were acquired and resurrected by another professional car builder in Norwalk, Ohio which in 2004 was producing a line of funeral coaches and limousines on Cadillac and Lincoln chassis under the Miller-Meteor brand name.

Regulatory Changes

At the same time coachbuilders met downsizing in the automotive industry, the federal government in the United States updated its requirements concerning minimum width, headroom, and equipment levels of emergency vehicles. These changes were part of the 1973 National EMS Systems Act, which was passed by Congress in 1974, and implemented four years later (in 1978). In order for communities to receive federal funds, their ambulances were required to meet updated federal specifications. Passenger-based vehicles were purposely excluded from legislation and the last American-made automobile-based ambulance was built in 1978.

Three design styles meet the criteria and are still in use today (as of 2017):

Type	Chassis	Compartment
Type I	1-ton truck chassis	Modular
Type II	Heavy-duty van	Van body with raised roof
Type III	Cutaway van chassis	Modular

In the early 1970s, Wayne introduced a full line of non-car-based ambulances; the Type III Medi-cruiser was based on the popular Dodge B-series van Tradesman panel van, the Care-O-Van was a Type II ambulance and the Type I Guardian, an early version of a 1-ton truck-based modular ambulance.

==== Rabbitransit: 41-MPG Taxi ====
About the time of the 1979 energy crisis, Wayne's Engineering Department experimented with creation of a stretch conversion of the diesel-powered Volkswagen Rabbit. The "Rabbitransit" vehicle would have the potential to transport a large number of passengers (8–12) with very efficient fuel consumption in comparison with other automobiles.

The mini-taxi project was dropped by Wayne. The frequently seen "Rabbitransit" at the Richmond plant could not be sold for highway use and it was later destroyed.

==== Sale by Thyssen ====
Although not publicly reported (as corporate ownership under Thyssen was private), it is likely that Wayne and Welles began incurring losses around 1980 or 1981, and these continued into 1982. By 1983, Wayne dealers and union leaders were told that the annual losses at Wayne/Welles were reportedly in the millions, and the Thyssen owners were poised to end the relationship and financial hemorrhage.

In 1984, following significant concessions by its unionized workers, members of United Auto Workers Local # 721 which were intended to make the company more efficient, Wayne Corporation (and its Canadian subsidiary, Welles, Ltd.) were sold by Thyssen to new owners.

=== Richmond Transportation Corporation (1985–1992) ===
Wayne Corporation company logo, post-Indian Head ownership (c. 1975–1992)

In 1984, Richmond Transportation Corporation (RTC) was formed by Jack H. Dekruif, a Corona del Mar, California-based industrialist, and several officers who had served at Wayne for many years under the Indian Head and Thyssen ownership. RTC acquired Wayne Corporation and its Welles subsidiary in Canada in February, 1985. Terry G. Whitesell was named President of RTC. A civic leader in Richmond, Indiana, his prior responsibilities at Wayne included sales, marketing, and purchasing over a period of more than 15 years. Whitesell was well known within the company, its dealer and supplier networks, and the industry.

Although as industrialist investor, Dekruif had a track record of liquidating troubled businesses, he was persuaded to allow the new organization to operate and compete. Several successful years followed. The Chaperone and Chaperone II products on cutaway van chassis did well, and several Wayne dealer-contractors were expanding, most notably Laidlaw. In the fall of 1986, the company was preparing to launch an initial public stock offering (IPO) when "Black Monday" struck the stock market that October, forcing cancellation of the IPO.

==== New-generation buses: Chaperone and Lifestar ====
In 1985, Wayne introduced the Chaperone, a school bus designed to use a cutaway van chassis. Although the Busette had proven successful in the marketplace, its standard interior height of 63 inches (1,600 mm) was far shorter than a full-size school bus. In addition, the company sought to adapt the longitudinal-panel construction of the Wayne Lifeguard on a smaller bus. Using the same GM and Ford dual rear-wheel chassis as the Busette/Transette, the Chaperone fit the single-panel construction of the Lifeguard on its body, along with a standard bus-style door. The Busette would remain in production alongside the Chaperone through 1990, when Wayne sold its body tooling to Mid Bus.

For 1986, Wayne Corporation introduced the Wayne Lifestar, its first transit-style school bus since the early 1970s and its first transit-style bus with a front-engine layout since World War II. Designed specifically for school bus use, the body of the Lifestar was designed to share the longitudinal side panels of the Lifeguard. Unlike its largest competitors, Wayne did not have the manufacturing equipment or capacity to build chassis in-house; consequently, chassis from an outside supplier was crucial. Supply problems outside of the company's control led to the use of several suppliers for the Lifestar over its production run.

==== Bankruptcy ====
In the school bus marketplace, Wayne struggled alongside its competitors. In 1986, a major potential order for Wayne in Canada was split between Wayne and Ward. During 1987, its Welles factory in Canada was destroyed by fire; to keep the division in business, Wayne had to remodel a separate factory in Windsor; in June 1990, the Welles division was closed entirely.

Shortly after the introduction of the Wayne Lifestar, the Blue Bird TC/2000 was introduced; a model similar to the Lifestar, the TC/2000 captured a large share of the school bus segment. In 1991, Navistar, a chassis supplier for the Wayne Lifestar, purchased a controlling interest in AmTran; along with the end of Ward in school bus manufacturing, the purchase also began a period of mergers and acquisitions of school bus manufacturers by chassis suppliers.

Richmond Transportation Corporation (RTC) declared bankruptcy in August 1992, with the company put up for auction.

== Post-Bankruptcy ==
=== Wayne Wheeled Vehicles (1993–1995) ===
After the bankruptcy of Richmond Transportation Corporation, Wayne Corporation effectively ceased to exist. During its liquidation, the product rights and many of the assets of the company (aside from the company itself and its liabilities) were purchased in February 1993 by the BMY defense subsidiary of Harsco Corporation for $2.1 million. Seeking to diversify beyond military production, BMY relaunched the Wayne brand as Wayne Wheeled Vehicles (WWV) and relocated bus manufacturing to its Marysville, Ohio headquarters.

For the first time since 1875, Wayne no longer was associated with Richmond, Indiana; the Wayne Corporation factory was not included in the sale and remained shuttered. In Ohio, the Lifeguard and Lifestar full-size buses restarted production alongside the Chaperone small bus (the Busette ended production in 1990). The school buses restarted production largely unchanged, with the most notable revision being a change in chassis suppliers for the Lifestar.

During 1994, Harsco began to change its footprint as a defense supplier; leading to BMY ending production of its 5-ton truck line. After an attempted sale of Wayne to a commercial bus manufacturer fell through, WWV was closed down by parent company Harsco in June 1995.

At the time of its closure, Wayne was in the process of developing the RD-9000 school bus. A rear-engine design, the RD-9000 featured significant advances and innovations, improving usage for both driving and servicing the vehicle. The vehicle was only built as a prototype, with some features of the RD-9000 later adopted by competitive manufacturers.

=== Crown by Carpenter ===
See Also: Crown By Carpenter

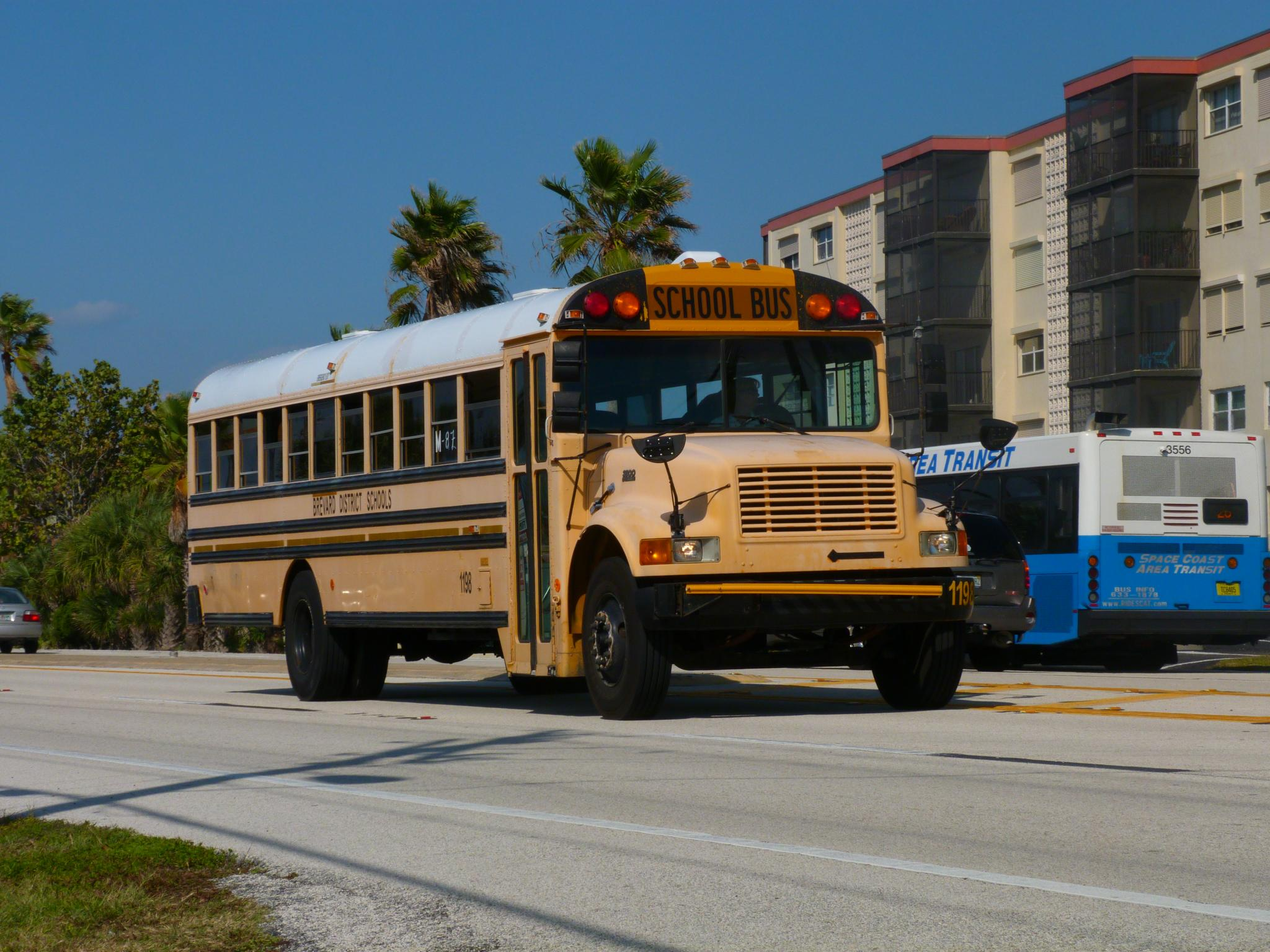
Crown by Carpenter "Classic" school bus; produced with Wayne exterior and interior body parts

Alongside Wayne, Indiana was home to school bus manufacturer Carpenter Body Works, a family-owned company from its 1919 founding until 1990. In 1994, Carpenter relocated from its Mitchell, Indiana, facilities to lease the former Wayne Corporation Richmond, Indiana facilities in their entirety. By moving to the Wayne facilities, Carpenter leveraged its existing workforce and with former Wayne Corporation employees. Both the leadership and workforce based at Richmond included a number of veterans of the former Wayne operations there; as such, they brought considerable experience and knowledge of the plant and industry to the effort.

For 1996 production, Carpenter unveiled extensive changes to its body design. The body structure was strengthened with single-piece roof bows and full-length exterior lower guard rails; new welding procedures (allowed by the newer equipment at the Richmond factory) strengthened roof joints (without a crucial structural flaw later found in Mitchell-produced buses). The tooling from the Wayne factory also provided some components to update the body, with the Wayne Lifeguard donating its windshield, driver control panel, and entry door for the redesigned Carpenter body.

Though retaining its official corporate name, Carpenter considered the transformation of its bus line so extensive that it changed its branding to Crown by Carpenter. Resurrecting the first half of the Crown Coach name, the company introduced a revised version of a Crown Coach emblem introduced in the late 1980s. In an effort to further diversify its product line outside of school buses, the company introduced a delivery truck loosely based on its Cadet bus products.

Facing a similar market situation as Wayne did at the beginning of the decade, Carpenter continued to struggle for market share through the end of the 1990s, leading to its closure. In 1998, the company was acquired by Michigan-based Spartan Motors, one of its largest chassis suppliers. In a similar situation, AmTran and Thomas Built Buses were acquired by Navistar and Freightliner, respectively. At the end of the 1990s, lower initial capital costs for school buses began to trump their longevity; when it was time for purchasing decisions, financially pressed districts and contractors tended to select cheaper products with shorter life cycles.

After 1999, Carpenter retired the Crown name and its small bus lines. In another redesign of the body, Carpenter kept the Wayne Lifeguard entry door; while the windshield was redesigned, the dashboard of the Lifeguard was adopted nearly in its entirety. In early 2001, majority owner Spartan Motors (holding a 2/3 stake) did not see any potential return on any further investments made on the company, voting to end the venture.

=== Fate of the factory ===
The former Wayne Corporation plant, after standing idle for a number of years, was purchased by a group of investors in 2005 with the intention of using the plant and surrounding property for a business park. The investors intended to use the large plant to house a number of smaller companies, rather than looking for a single, large corporation. At the end of 2006, the property along Interstate 70 was becoming re-utilized for a number of retail and industrial enterprises.

== Products ==
- Wayne Papoose school bus (1971–1973)
- Wayne Lifeguard school bus (1973–1995)
- Wayne Busette school bus (1973–1990)
- Wayne Transette bus
- Wayne Transette XT bus
- Wayne Chaperone school bus (1985–1995)
- Wayne Chaperone II school bus (1985–1995)
- Wayne Lifestar school bus (1986–1995)
- Wayne RD 9000 school bus (1995 prototype only; never mass-produced)

Wayne Corporation Timeline
Bus Type	1970s										1980s										1990s
Bus Type	'70	'71	'72	'73	'74	'75	'76	'77	'78	'79	'80	'81	'82	'83	'84	'85	'86	'87	'88	'89	'90	'91	'92	'93	'94	'95
Type A				Busette
Type A																Chaperone/Chaperone II
Type B		Papoose
Type C	Conventional			Lifeguard
Type D	RE
Type D																	Lifestar
