= National Radio Club =

Non-profit radio club

The National Radio Club (NRC) is a non-profit hobbyist organization in the United States focused on the pursuit of DXing on the AM broadcast band. The group was founded in 1933 as a result of merging several regional radio clubs.

The NRC produces a magazine, DX News, which is issued 20 times annually. The club has also authored numerous books and radio station directories over the years. In 1985, to cater to the needs of visually impaired DX enthusiasts, the "DX Audio Service" was introduced. This was an audio cassette version of the newsletter, supplemented with additional content. However, this service ceased in 2014.

In 2005, the NRC set up an online platform, which enabled subscribers to download DX News. The site hosts several forums, with some open to all DX enthusiasts. However, forums with columns from DX News are exclusively accessible to NRC members.

The NRC organizes an annual convention, generally held in late summer. The location rotates between different American cities each year and the event is usually hosted by one or more of its members.
