= Crane Carrier Company =

American truck chassis manufacturer

- Founded: 1946; 80 years ago
- Founder: Robert L. Zeligson
- Defunct: April 2021; 5 years ago
- Fate: Bought by Battle Motors
- Successor: Battle Motors
- Headquarters: New Philadelphia, Ohio, US
- Products: cranes, trucks, wheeled loaders
- Parent: Illinois Tool Works (2008–2013); Hines Corporation (2013–2019); Turnspire Capital Partners (2019–2021); Battle Motors (from 2021)
- Website: cranecarrier.com

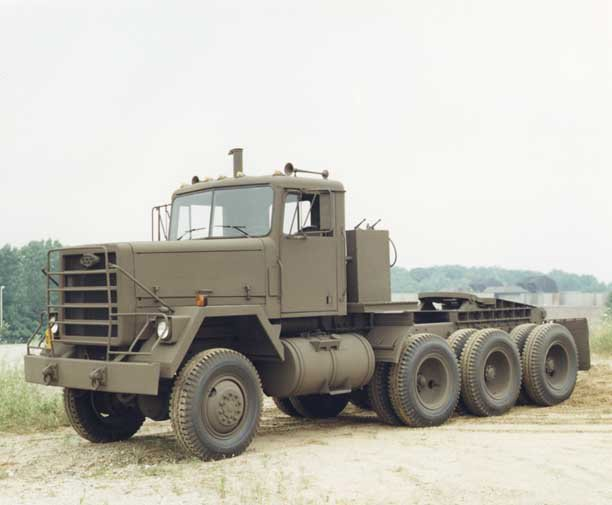
A CCC M920 MET (Medium Equipment Transporter), military version of the Centaur.

Crane Carrier Company (CCC) was a manufacturer that specialized in construction truck and garbage truck chassis. Headquartered in New Philadelphia, Ohio, it was established by Robert Zeligson in 1946, along with the affiliated Zeligson Trucks. In 2021, CCC was bought by Battle Motors.

The primary design of CCC's trucks are Cab-Beside-Engine (CBE) or half-cabs, most notably the Century II Unimixer. Half-cabs have the advantage of being able to carry the booms of cranes, hence the name of the company.

== History ==
CCC began as a firm in Tulsa, Oklahoma that remanufactured World War II-era surplus vehicles for civilian crane-carrying use. In 1953, CCC presented their first own truck, and soon evolved into a company that manufactured over-the-road trucks for concrete mixing, logging, mining, and other construction industries, including a wheeled loader.

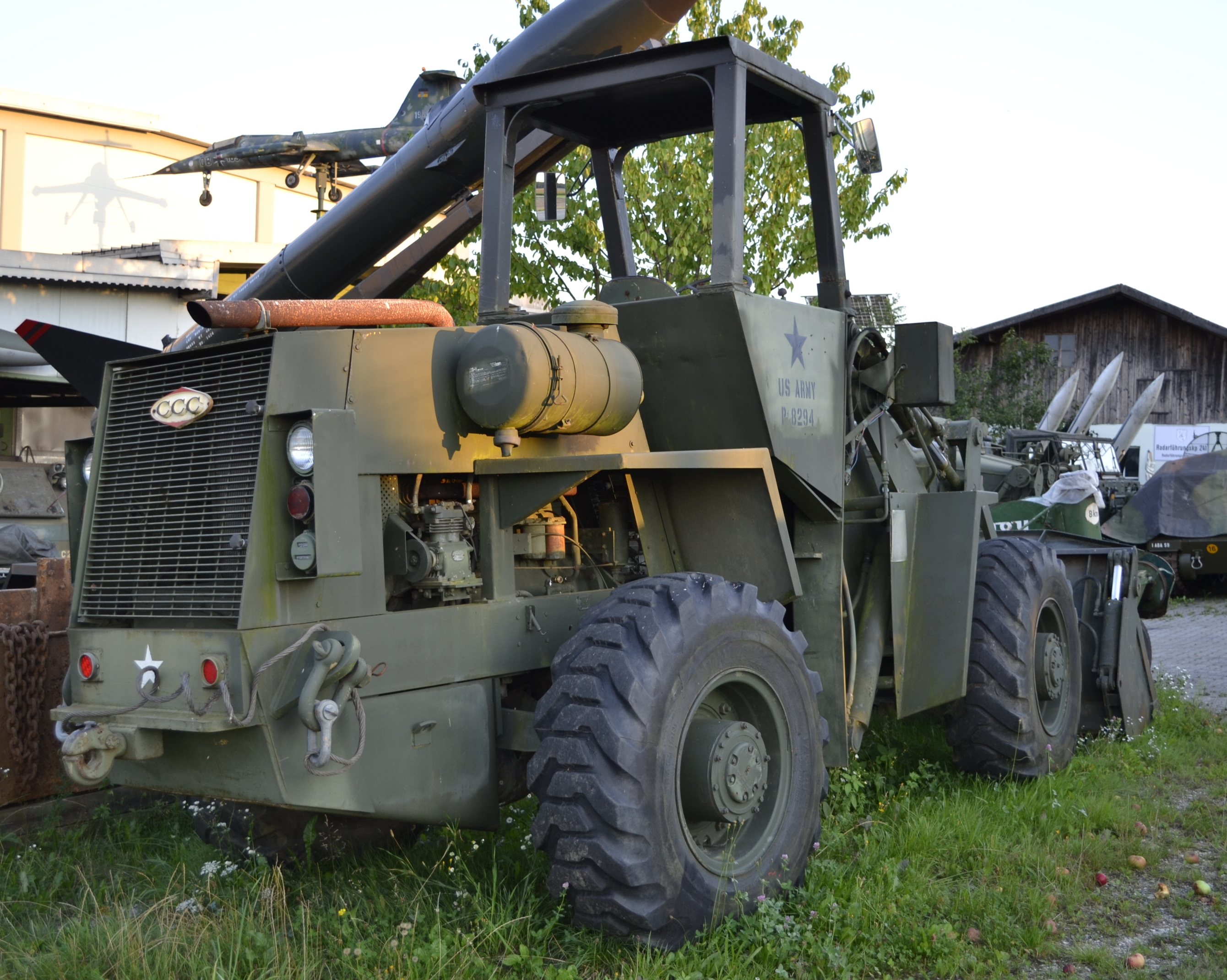
CCC wheel loader built for the U.S. Army

Though primarily building CBEs, CCC started moving toward the two-seater market during the 1970s, with models such as the Centaur. The Centurion is a series of low-entry trucks, primarily used for garbage collection. The Centurion has an engine mounted behind the cab and was also available with dual controls.

CCC manufactured Type D school bus chassis during the early to mid-1990s, which were used by bus manufacturers Carpenter Body Company and Wayne Corporation.

CCC sold Zeligson in 1980. It lasted as a separate company for nine years. In 2008, CCC and its parent, CCI Corp., were sold to Glenview, Illinois-based Illinois Tool Works, which stated its plans to continue operating CCC as a separate company.

CCC was acquired by Hines Corporation in June 2013 and the company’s headquarters was relocated to New Philadelphia, Ohio. Under Hines, a strategic merger was initiated to join CCC and Kimble Manufacturing forming Hines Specialty Vehicle Group – manufacturer of custom heavy-duty chassis and purpose built vehicles for the refuse and recycling, infrastructure maintenance, ground support, agriculture, oil and gas, and concrete mixer markets.

Crane Carrier Company (CCC) embarked on a brief new chapter by launching as an independent company in 2019. Headquartered in New Philadelphia, Ohio, CCC consisted of two brands, Crane Carrier Company (truck chassis) and Crane Carrier Company Engineered Chassis. The Company was sold to Turnspire Capital Partners later in 2019. In April 2021 Battle Motors, a developer of heavy duty trucks with a focus on electrification, acquired Crane Carrier.

== Operations ==
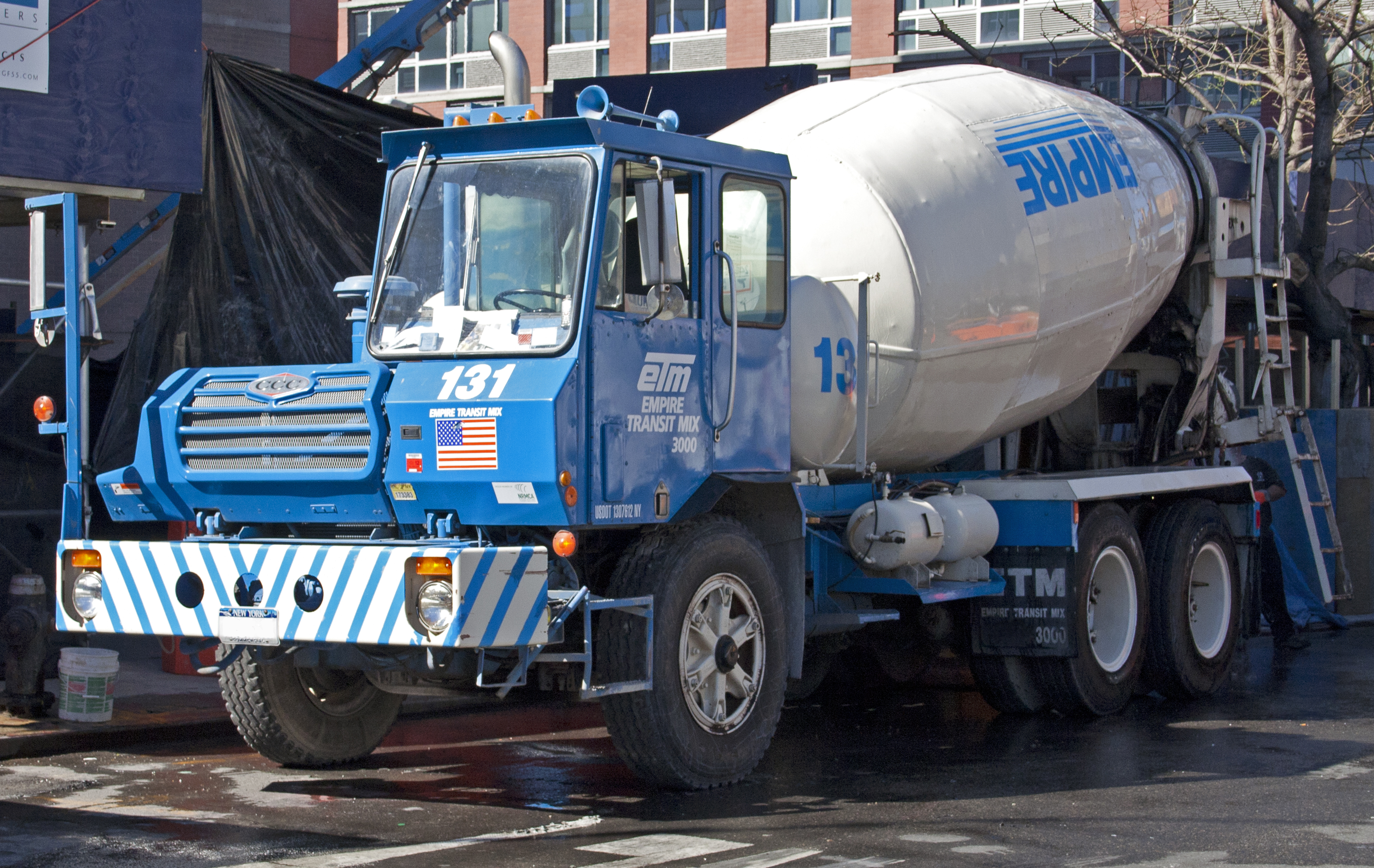
A 1999 CCC Century II concrete mixer

In addition to over-the-road trucks and wheeled loaders, CCC also builds trucks for oil drilling, water well drilling, terminal tractors, and aviation fuelers. As with most American specialty truck manufacturers, the customer's choice of proprietary engines and transmissions have been available.

== Additional Reading ==
- The Complete Book of Trucks & Tractors, by John Carroll & Peter Davies.
- American Truck & Bus Spotter's Guide; 1920–1985, by Tad Burness.
