= Enviri =

American global industrial company

Enviri Corporation
- Type: Public
- Traded as: NYSE: NVRI
- Industry: Environmental
- Founded: 1853; 173 years ago - Public, as Harsco Corporation (1956; 70 years ago)
- Headquarters: Philadelphia, Pennsylvania
- Key people: Russell Hochman, President & CEO
- Products: ecoproducts
- Revenue: ▼US$$2.342 billion (2024)
- Operating income: ▼US$31.7 million (2024)
- Net income: ▼US$−122.6 million (2024)
- Total assets: US$346.3 million (2023)
- Total equity: ▲US$183.2 million (2024)
- Number of employees: 12,000 (2024)
- Website: enviri.com/

Enviri Corporation is an environmental company based in Philadelphia, Pennsylvania. It operates in over 30 countries and employs approximately 12,000 people worldwide. The company addresses complex environmental issues for large industries, including steel, railways, and energy.

Enviri's common stock is a component of the S&P SmallCap 600 Index and the Russell 2000 Index. Founded as a railway car manufacturer in 1853, it rebranded from Harsco to Enviri in 2023.

== History ==
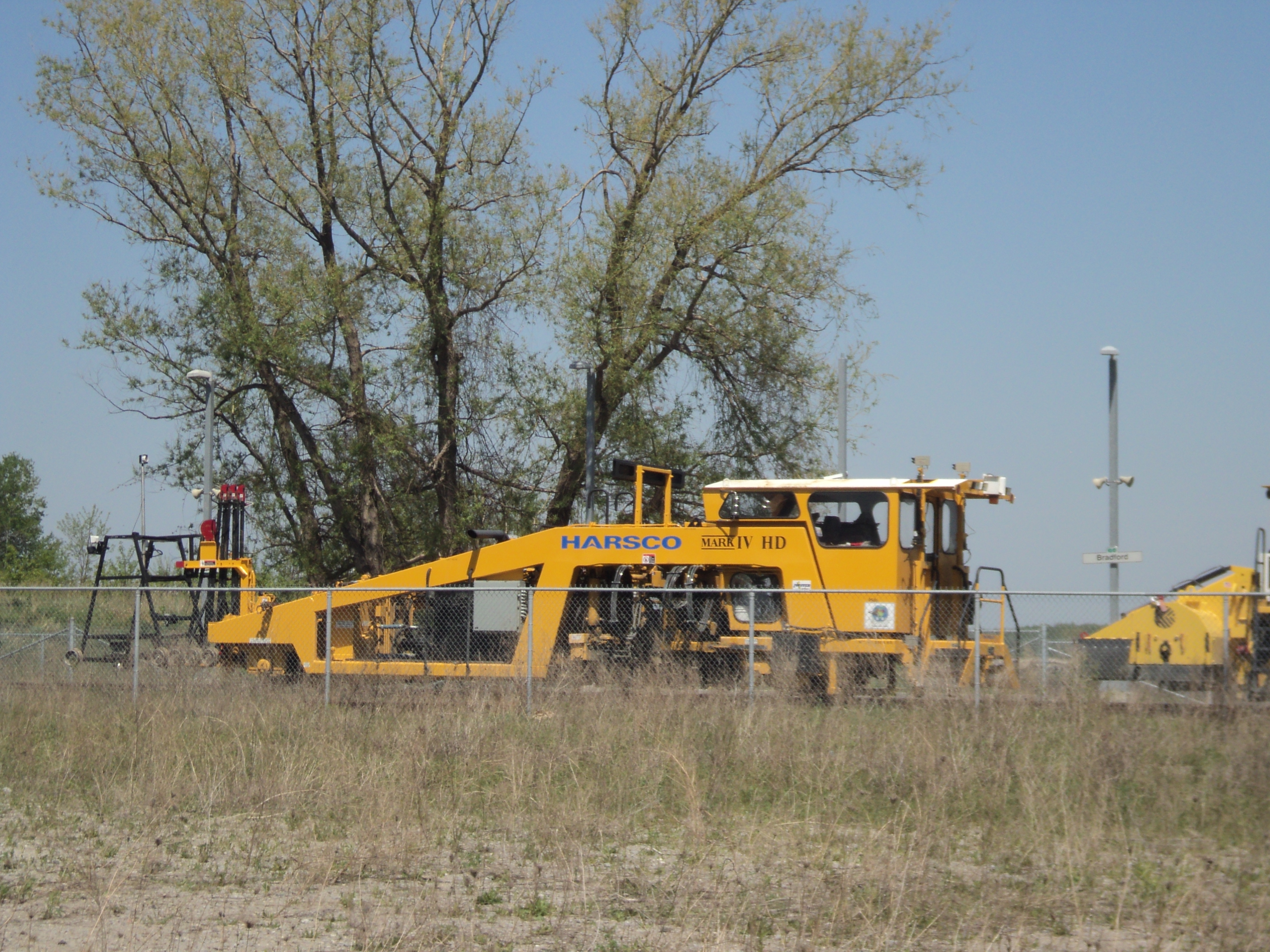
Harsco rail equipment seen in Bradford, Ontario, May 2015.

Harsco was founded in 1853 as The Harrisburg Car Manufacturing Company and became the Harrisburg Steel Corporation in 1935. Following a series of acquisitions, the company became Harsco Corporation in 1956, forming three divisions: Metals & Minerals (Now Harsco Environmental), Rail, and Industrial.

By the early 1990s, Harsco products and services covered defense, industrial, commercial, and construction applications, with over 250 manufacturing, reclamation, distribution, and service facilities across 14 countries.

In 2018, Harsco acquired Altek, a UK producer of aluminum processing equipment.

In 2019, Harsco Metals & Minerals rebranded to Harsco Environmental, and acquired Clean Earth, a U.S. provider of services for specialty waste streams.

In April 2020, Harsco Corporation acquired the Environmental Solutions business (ESOL) from Stericycle, Inc. The company finally rebranded as Enviri in 2023.

Enviri operates as the mother company with its three main divisions Clean Earth, Harsco Environmental and Harsco Rail. Additional subsidiary companies include Altek, SteelPhalt, and Black Beauty Abrasives.

== Financial information ==
Harsco reported total sales of US$1.89 billion in fiscal year 2022.

=== Stock exchanges ===
Enviri is traded publicly on NYSE under Enviri Corporation with ticker symbol $NVRI (formerly $HSC).
