= International S series (bus chassis) =

International S series "Schoolmaster" International 3700/3800
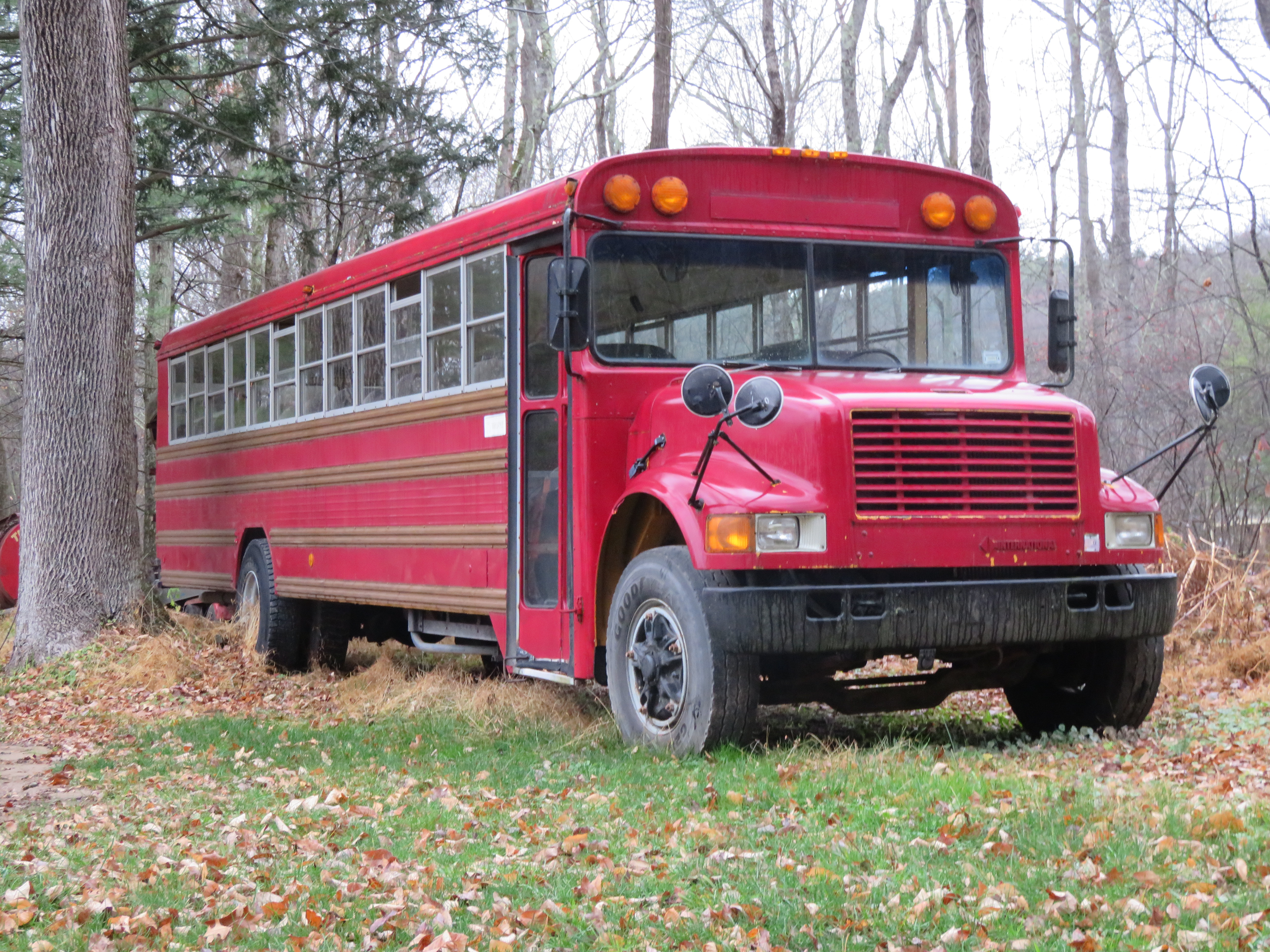
- International 3800 with Wayne body

Overview
- Production: 1979–2004

Body and chassis
- Class: Class 6
- Body style: Cowled chassis (conventional)
- Related: International S series/International 4000 series (1989–2001)

Chronology
- Predecessor: International Harvester Loadstar (bus chassis)
- Successor: International 3300 (DuraStar)

The bus chassis variant of the International S series is a cowled bus chassis (conventional style) that was produced by International Harvester (later Navistar International) from 1979 to 2004. Produced primarily for school bus applications, the chassis was also produced for other applications, including commercial-use buses and cutaway-cab buses. In addition, the cowled chassis formed the basis for front-engine and rear-engine stripped chassis produced for bus applications.

Designed as a replacement for the International Loadstar bus chassis, the S-series bus chassis was produced in two distinct generations. Matching the development of the International S series, during 1989, the model line underwent a major update, becoming the International 3800. The 3800 was also made in a truck variant. In 2004, the International 3800 ended production, replaced by the International 3300 (a cowled-chassis version of the International 4300/DuraStar). In production for over 25 years, the S-series bus chassis was the longest-lived model line ever produced by International and the final Navistar product line developed by International Harvester.

== First generation (S series; 1979–1989) ==
International S series "Schoolmaster"
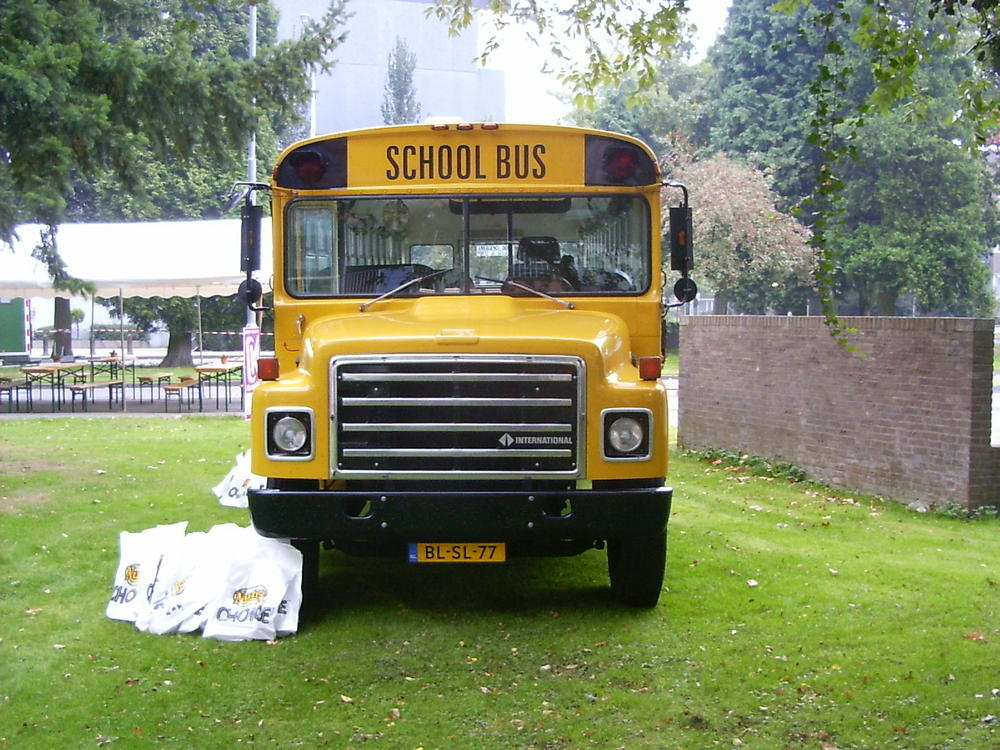
- 1987-1989 Navistar International S-1800 (retired)

Overview
- Manufacturer: International Harvester; Navistar International
- Also called: International Harvester S-1723/S-1753 "Schoolmaster"
- Production: 1979–1989
- Assembly: United States: Springfield, Ohio

Body and chassis
- Body style: Cowled chassis; School bus; Commercial bus; Stripped chassis (1853FC)
- Platform: International S series

Powertrain
- Engine: Gasoline: International Harvester 345 cubic-inch V8 (1979–1986); International Harvester 392 cubic-inch V8 (1979–1986); International Harvester MV-404 6.6 liter V8 (1979–1981); International Harvester MV-446 7.3 liter V8 (1979–1981); Diesel: International Harvester D-150/170/190 9.0 liter V8 (September 1978 – December 1979); International Harvester 9.0L V8 (January 1980–1987); International Harvester IDI 6.9 L (420 cu in) (1983–1987); International Harvester IDI 7.3 L (444 cu in) (1986–1989); International Harvester DT466 7.6 L (466 cu in) (1979–1989); International Harvester DT360 5.9 L (360 cu in) (1986–1989); Caterpillar 3208 10.4 L (636 cu in) (1979–1981)
- Transmission: 4-speed manual 5-speed manual Allison AT545 4-speed automatic Allison MT643 4-speed automatic

Dimensions
- Wheelbase: 152 in (3,861 mm); 170 in (4,318 mm); 193 in (4,902 mm); 216 in (5,486 mm); 254 in (6,452 mm); 276 in (7,010 mm)

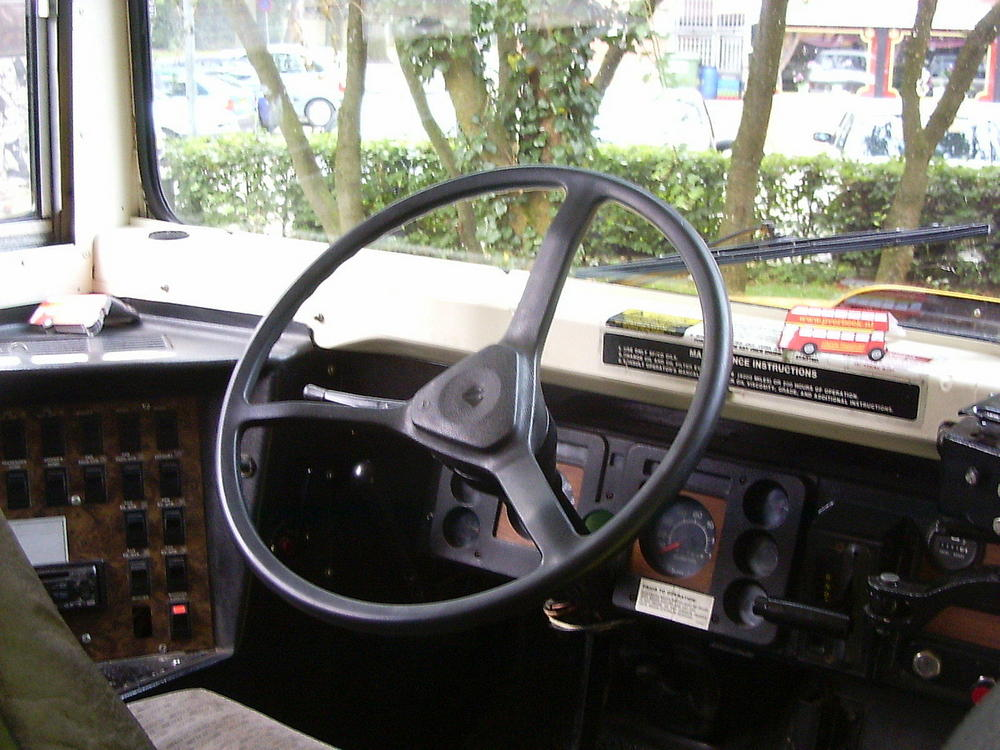
Driver's compartment of a typical 1980s International S-series school bus (Wayne Lifeguard body pictured)

Released during 1979 production, International Harvester introduced the S-series bus chassis alongside its conventional-cab counterpart. Replacing the bus chassis variant of the International Harvester Loadstar, the S-series chassis continued the use of the "Schoolmaster" product name. In a shift from being an adaptation of a truck chassis, the Schoolmaster was designed as a distinct model line intended solely for bus use. Along with completely straight frame rails, the chassis was designed with a flat-back firewall, allowing for body mounting with minimal design adaptations.

During its production, the Schoolmaster changed relatively little. Along with revisions to the powertrain, many changes reflected the manufacturer transition from International Harvester to Navistar International. For 1987, the grille underwent a revision, with the "International" wording moved from the top of the grille to the bottom left, paired with Navistar's famous "Diamond Road" logo (replacing the IH logo on the steering wheel). In another change, Navistar ended the use of gasoline-fuel engines (in all of its vehicles).

=== Model overview ===
The Schoolmaster was produced as a variant of the International S1700 and S1800 (Class 6 trucks), with the lighter-duty S1700 and heavier-duty S1800. Along with powertrain configurations, the two model ranges were distinguished largely by suspension weight capacities. Following International traditional model nomenclature, the specific model numbers for the Schoolmasters ended in 3; gasoline-engine examples were given "23" model numbers while diesel-engine examples were given a "53" model number.

International S-series "Schoolmaster" model designations
Model Names	S1700		S1800		1853-FC
Model Names	S1723	S1753	S1823	S1853	1853-FC
Fuel type	Gasoline	Diesel	Gasoline	Diesel	Diesel
Years produced	1979–1986	c.1983–1989	1979–1981	1979–1989	1981–1989

=== Powertrain ===
At its launch, the Schoolmaster was offered with four gasoline engines and three diesel engines (dependent on the model range specified). The S1723 was powered solely with gasoline engines, with the International 345 V8 as standard, with three optional gasoline V8s (the 392, and the MV404 and MV446). The S1823 was offered solely with the MV-series V8s (which ended production after 1981). The S1853 was powered by diesel engines, with a standard 9.0L V8, along with a DT466 and Caterpillar 3208 as options (the latter, discontinued around 1982, for the Schoolmaster).

For 1983, an S1753 was introduced to introduce diesel engines to the S1700 chassis; in place of the 9.0L V8 and DT466 inline-6, International debuted a 6.9L IDI-series V8. In 1987, the displacement of the IDI V8 was enlarged to 7.3L. A 4-speed manual was standard on the S1700 variants, while S1800 variants were equipped with a 5-speed manual; a 4-speed automatic was optional on all engines. Following the discontinuation of the MV-series engines, the S-1823 was phased out after 1981, while the S-1723 was phased out after 1986, after International withdrew production of gasoline engines entirely.

International S series "Schoolmaster" powertrain details
Engine	Production	Configuration	Fuel	Fuel System	Output	Transmission
International Harvester V345	1979-1986	345 cu in (5.7 L) OHV V8	Gasoline	Carburetor	147 hp	4-speed manual (S-1723 only) 5-speed manual (optional on S-1723, standard on S-1753, S-1823/1853 4-speed automatic (optional all)
International Harvester V392	1979-1986	392 cu in (6.4 L) OHV V8	Gasoline	Carburetor	185 hp	4-speed manual (S-1723 only) 5-speed manual (optional on S-1723, standard on S-1753, S-1823/1853 4-speed automatic (optional all)
International Harvester MV-404	1979-1982	404 cu in (6.6 L) OHV V8	Gasoline	Carburetor	189 hp (2-bbl) 206 hp (4-bbl)	4-speed manual (S-1723 only) 5-speed manual (optional on S-1723, standard on S-1753, S-1823/1853 4-speed automatic (optional all)
International Harvester MV-446	1979-1982	446 cu in (7.3 L) OHV V8	Gasoline	Carburetor	227 hp	4-speed manual (S-1723 only) 5-speed manual (optional on S-1723, standard on S-1753, S-1823/1853 4-speed automatic (optional all)
International Harvester 9.0L V8	1980-1989	551 cu in (9.0 L) OHV V8	Diesel	Direct injection	165 hp 180 hp	4-speed manual (S-1723 only) 5-speed manual (optional on S-1723, standard on S-1753, S-1823/1853 4-speed automatic (optional all)
International Harvester DT466	1979-1989	466 cu in (7.6 L) OHV inline-6 turbocharged/naturally aspirated	Diesel	Direct injection	180 hp 210 hp	4-speed manual (S-1723 only) 5-speed manual (optional on S-1723, standard on S-1753, S-1823/1853 4-speed automatic (optional all)
International Harvester IDI	1983-1987 (6.9L) 1986-1989 (7.3L)	420 cu in (6.9 L) OHV V8	Diesel	Indirect injection	155 hp 170 hp	4-speed manual (S-1723 only) 5-speed manual (optional on S-1723, standard on S-1753, S-1823/1853 4-speed automatic (optional all)
International Harvester IDI	1983-1987 (6.9L) 1986-1989 (7.3L)	444 cu in (7.3 L) OHV V8	Diesel	Indirect injection	170 hp 185 hp	4-speed manual (S-1723 only) 5-speed manual (optional on S-1723, standard on S-1753, S-1823/1853 4-speed automatic (optional all)
Caterpillar 3208	1979-c.1981	636 cu in (10.4 L) OHV V8 turbocharged/naturally aspirated	Diesel	Direct injection	160 hp 175 hp 200 hp 210 hp	4-speed manual (S-1723 only) 5-speed manual (optional on S-1723, standard on S-1753, S-1823/1853 4-speed automatic (optional all)

== Second generation (3800; mid-1989–2004) ==
International 3800
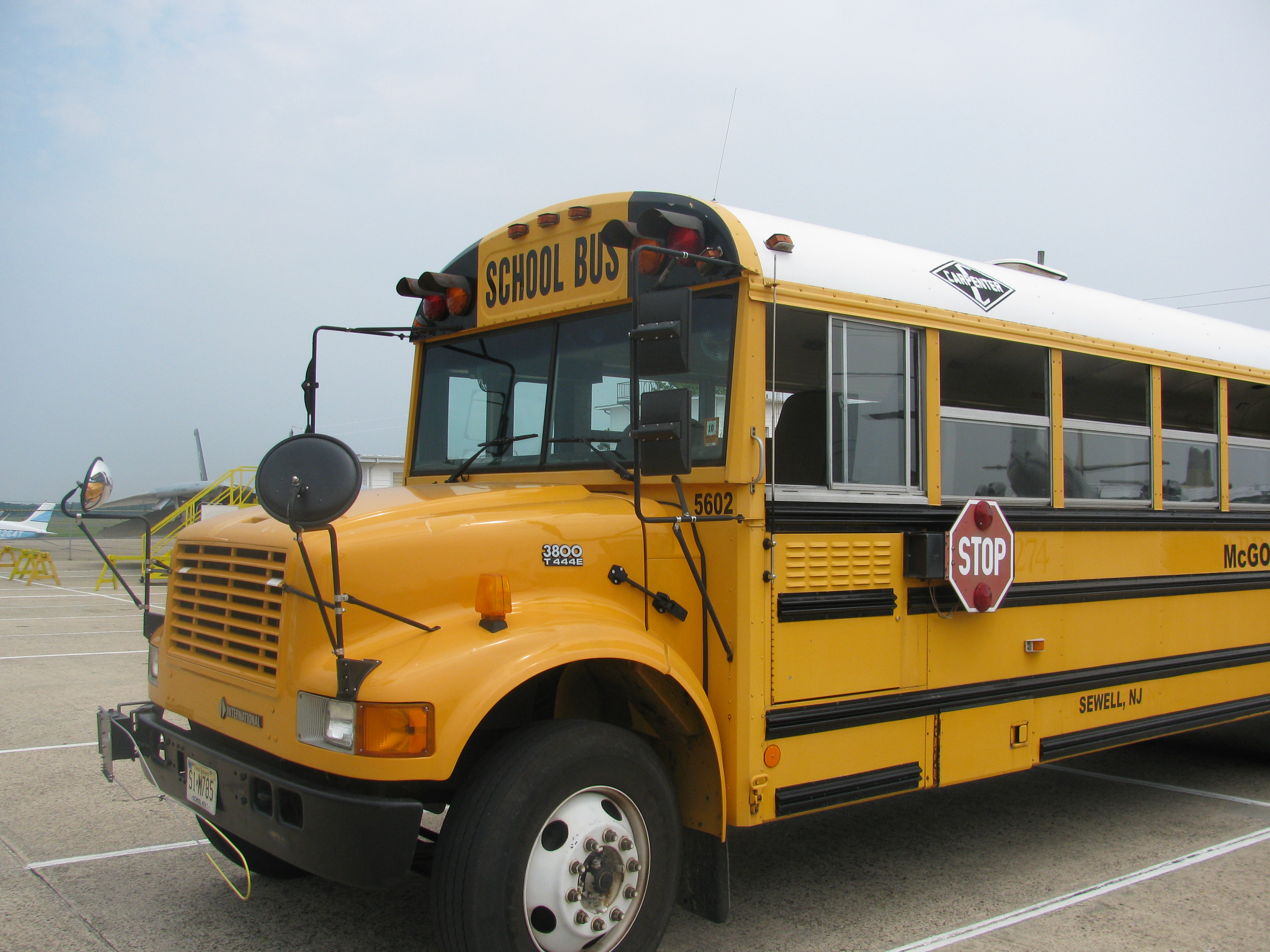
- 2000–2001 International 3800 (Carpenter Classic 2000 body)

Overview
- Manufacturer: Navistar International
- Also called: International 3700/3800
- Production: 1989–2004
- Assembly: United States: Springfield, Ohio; Conway, Arkansas; Tulsa, Oklahoma

Body and chassis
- Body style: Cowled chassis; School bus; Commercial bus; Front-engine stripped chassis (3900); Rear-engine stripped chassis (3000)
- Platform: International S series

Powertrain
- Engine: Diesel: Navistar DTA360 I6 (1989–1994); Navistar DT408 I6 (1994–1995); Navistar DTA466 I6 (1989–1998); Navistar DT466E I6 (1996–2004); Navistar 7.3L IDI V8 (1989–1994); Navistar T444E V8 (1994–2004)
- Transmission: 5-speed manual Allison AT545 4-speed automatic Allison MT643 4-speed automatic Allison 2000 series 5-speed 2000-2004

Chronology
- Successor: International 3300

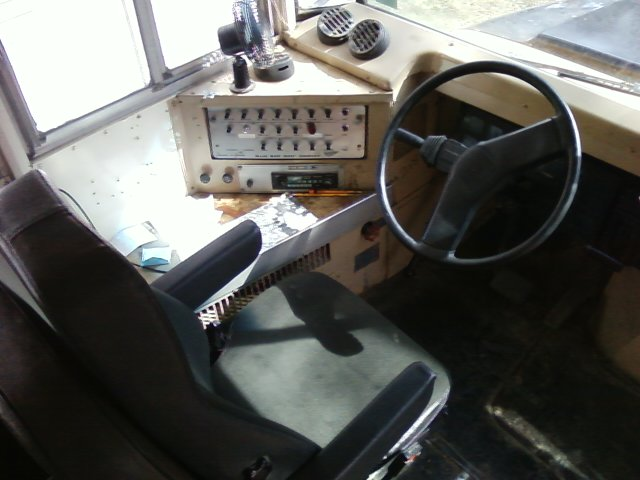
Driver's compartment of a typical 1990s International 3800 school bus

In 1989, Navistar introduced the second generation of the S-series medium-duty trucks, renaming the Class 6 range the 4000 series. Ending the 10-year use of the "Schoolmaster" product name, the bus chassis received a separate model designation; the S-1753 was replaced by the 3700, and the S-1853 was replaced by the 3800. As part of the redesign, the 3700/3800 were given a redesigned hood; along with aerodynamic improvements, the design included a lower hoodline and closer-fitting fenders. The front bumper was updated to better fit the design of the hood. While the cowled bus chassis was produced without a cab or interior, the steering column was redesigned (adapting a two-spoke steering wheel with spokes in an inverted "V" configuration) and larger gauges for the instrument cluster were introduced.

The 3700 (equivalent to a 4700) was lower in GVWR and equipped with a 7.3L IDI V8 and hydraulic brakes; the 3800 (equivalent to a 4900) was equipped with a DTA360 I6 and air brakes.

=== Model history ===
Over its 15 years of production, the second generation of the S-series chassis underwent few changes, centered around revisions to its powertrain. In 1991, the 3600 chassis variant was developed for the Thomas Vista semi-forward control conventional. The lower-GVWR 3700 was discontinued after 1994. For 1995, the 3800 (in line with the 4000-series) received chrome hood badges denoting the model series and its engine type; the "International" grille badging changed from red to chrome.

A key event that would affect school bus manufacturing during the later 1990s was the completion of the acquisition of AmTran by Navistar in April 1995. By the end of the decade, AmTran buses would begin to start wearing International badging on the body as well. To promote the change, in 2000, International redesigned the hood for its conventional bus, dubbed the International IC. These wore vertical grille slats instead of horizontal ones seen since 1989 (although the horizontal grille slats continued to be produced for the 3800 until 2004). As it was a change intended to promote IC Corporation, chassis destined for Blue Bird or Canadian manufacturer Corbeil were still received with the standard hood and grille design.

International S series "Schoolmaster" model designations
Model names	Conventional				Stripped chassis	
Model names	3400	3600	3700	3800	3900FC	3000
Fuel type	Diesel					
Years produced		1991–1998	1989–1994	1989–2004	1990–2010	1996–2024

=== Variants ===
==== 3400 ====
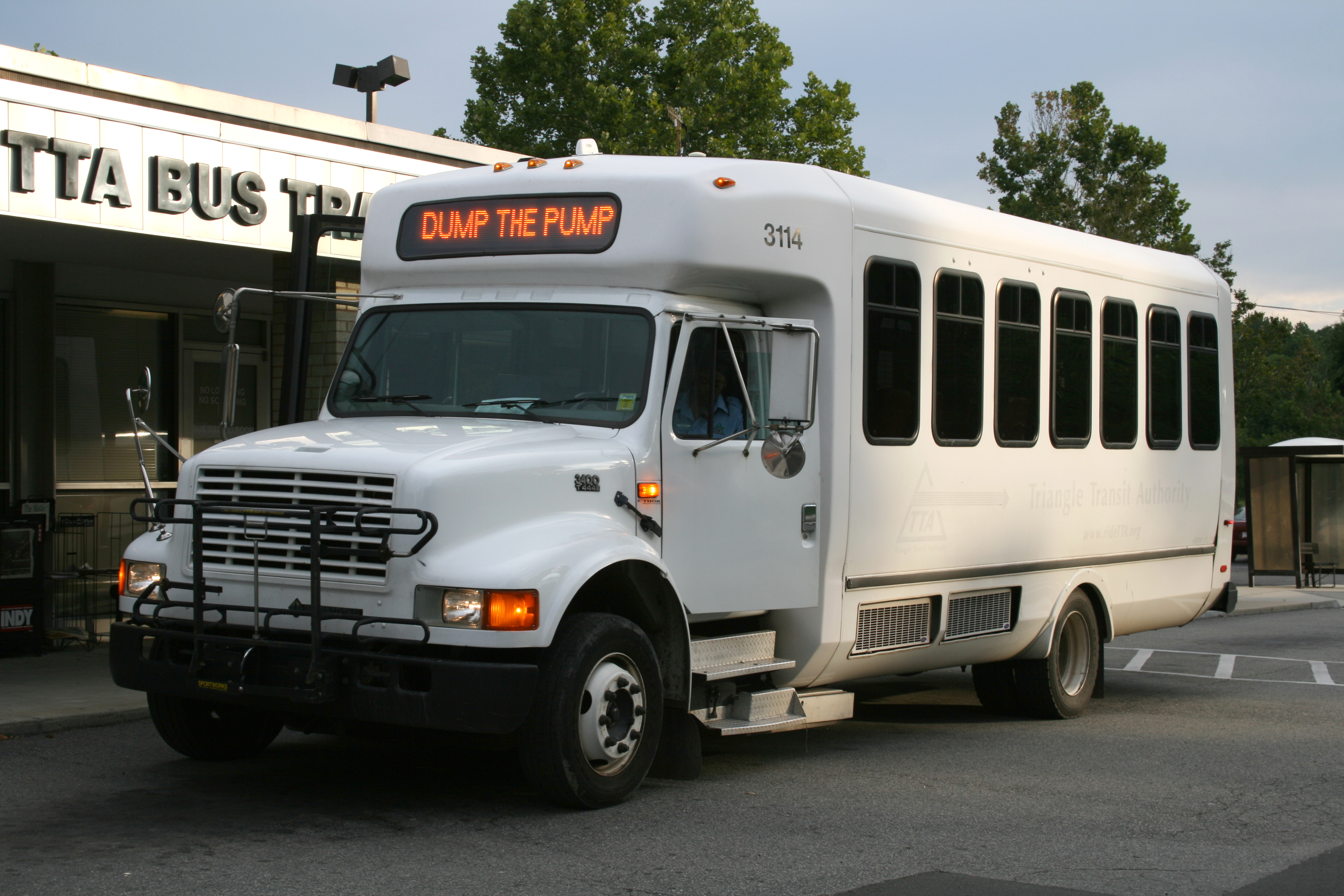
International 3400 in use as a transit bus.

Using the low-profile International 4700LP as a basis, the 3400 has been among the largest vehicles developed as cutaway cab chassis. While far larger than a van chassis, International marketed its design by allowing the higher GVWR and higher durability associated with a medium-duty chassis. All versions of the 3400 were powered by the 7.3L IDI and T444E V8 engines and used hydraulic brakes.

Primarily used by manufacturers of transit minibuses and specialty vehicles, during the mid to late 1990s, several school bus body manufacturers (Mid Bus and U.S. Bus) developed body designs for the International 3400.

After 2001, International ended production of the 4000-series; the 3400 was replaced by the 3200 based upon the new-generation 4000-series trucks (later the DuraStar, today the MV). While International (under its IC Bus brand) produces cutaway-cab chassis, all production is for commercial use, including transit, commercial, and specialty vehicle applications.

==== 3600 ====
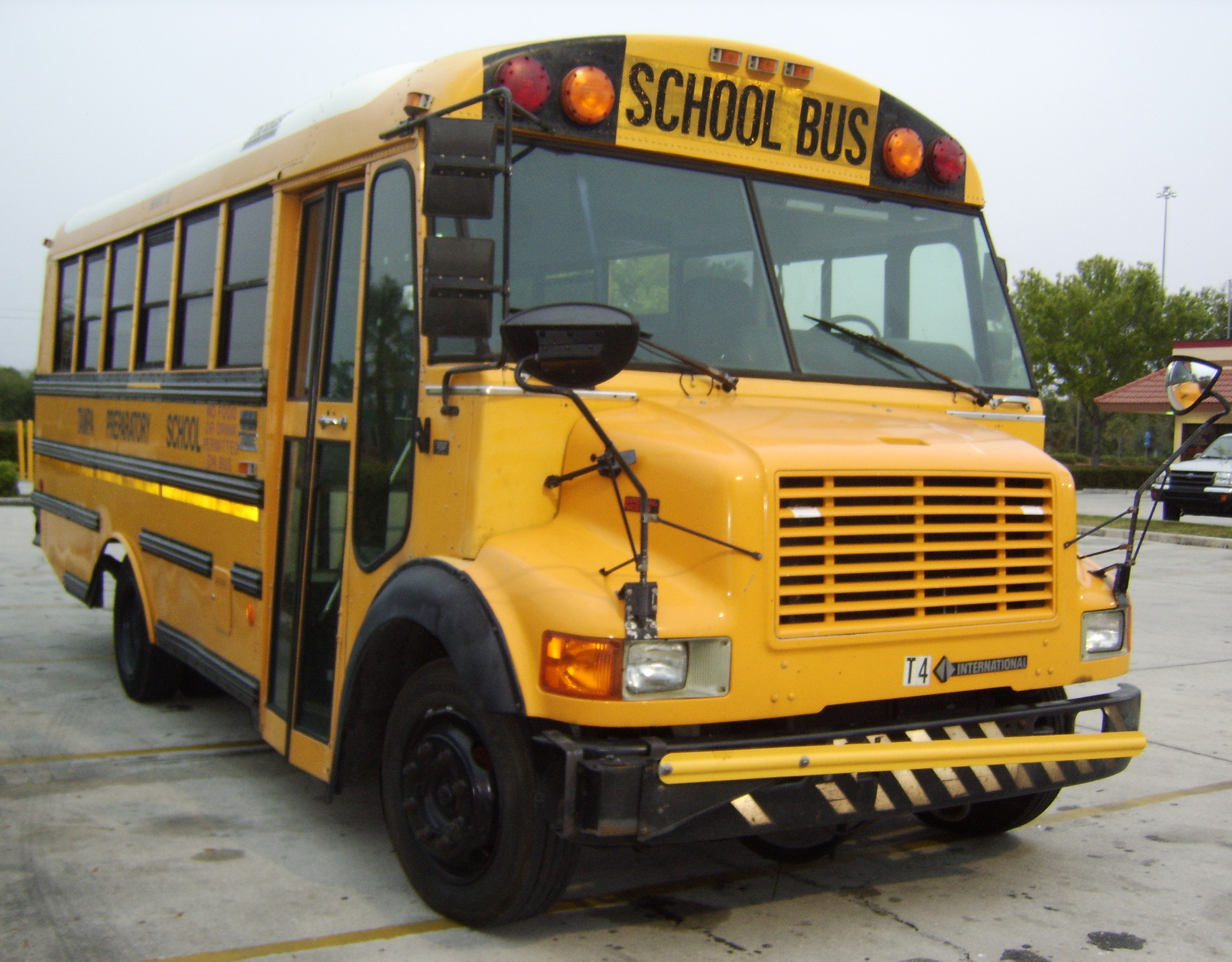
Thomas Vista, the bus body paired with the International 3600 chassis

Introduced in 1991, the 3600 was a chassis custom-designed for manufacturer Thomas Built Buses for its Thomas Vista product line. Designated a semi-forward control design, the Vista combined design elements of conventional and forward control school buses.

The 3600 chassis borrowed elements and its overall configuration from Navistar step van chassis, adapting other components from the 3800. In comparison to the 3800, the driver of the Vista sat further forward (shifted nearly atop the front axle instead of behind it). In line with a transit-style bus, the driver sat next to much of the engine; access from the front was also maintained via a tilting hood (shortened in length by nearly half). Both the 7.3L/T444E V8s and the DT inline-6 engines were offered.

As the 3600 chassis was developed alongside the 1991 update for the Thomas Vista body, it was never used on another product line. Following the purchase of Thomas Built Buses by Freightliner, the Thomas Vista was discontinued after 1998 production; elements of its design were adopted into the Thomas Saf-T-Liner C2.

==== 3700 ====
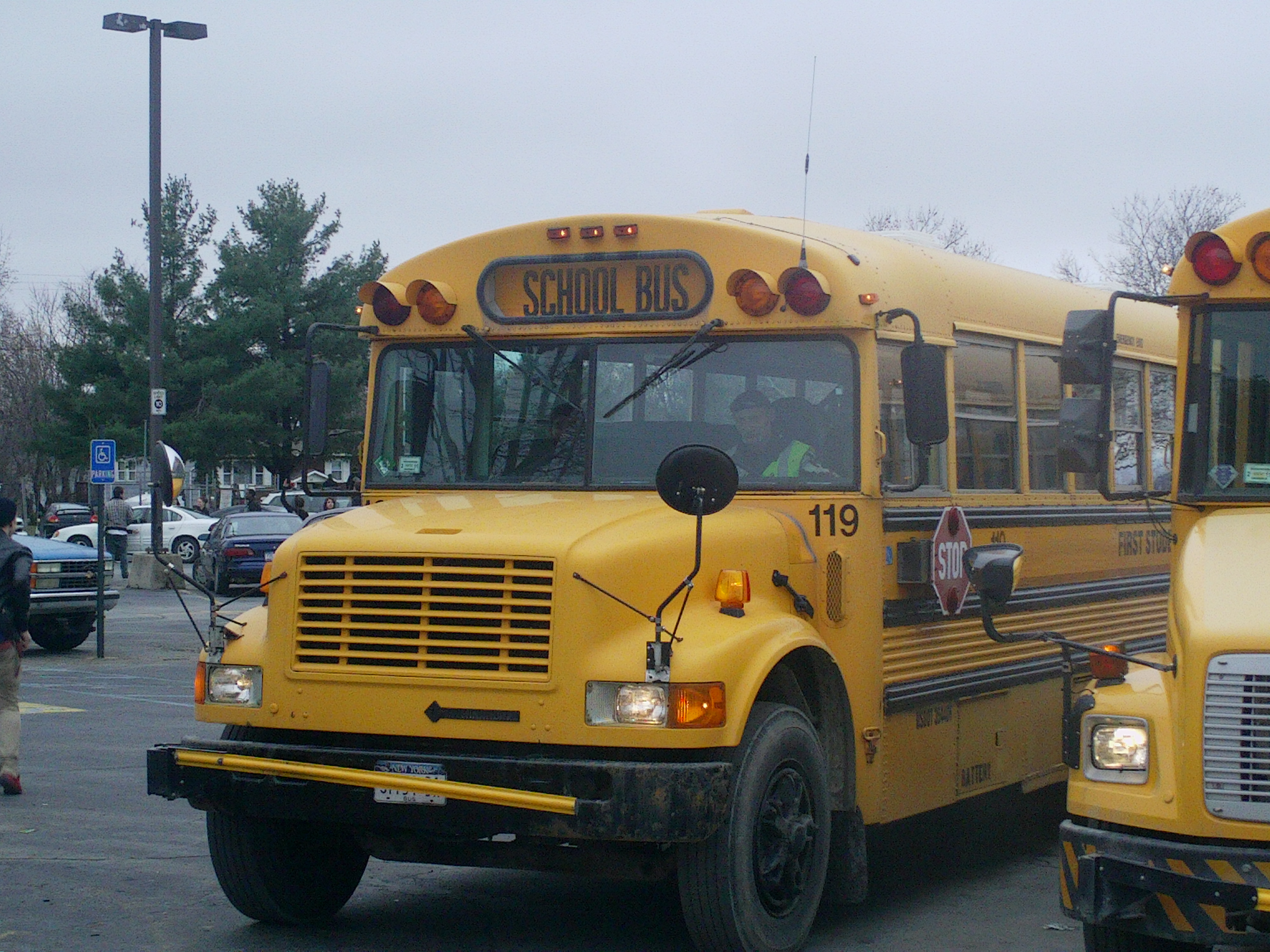
1994 International 3700 with Thomas body

From 1989 to 1994, International offered two versions of its conventional school bus chassis (as it had with the S series). The 3700 was the lighter-GVWR model of the lineup, derived from the International 4600. Only produced with the 7.3L IDI V8 engine, the 3700 was offered with hydraulic brakes.

For 1995, International consolidated the two model lines, discontinuing the 3700.

=== Powertrain ===
Following the retirement of gasoline engines in 1986, the second-generation S-series became the first American school bus chassis powered entirely with diesel engines. In place of both its predecessor (and successor), all engines were sourced from International. The 3700 offered the 7.3L IDI as a standard engine, with a DTA360 as a standard engine for the 3800; a DT466 was offered as an option on the latter.

Along with 5 and 6-speed manual transmissions, multiple automatic transmissions were paired with the T444E and DT466 engines.

1989-2004 International 3700/3800 powertrain details
Engine name	Production	Configuration	Fuel system	Output	Transmission
Navistar DTA360	1989-1994	360 cu in (5.9 L) I6 turbodiesel (aftercooled)	Direct injection (mechanical)		Spicer 5-speed manual Spicer 6+1 manual Eaton-Fuller 6-speed manual Allison AT545 automatic Allison MT643 automatic Allison A2000 automatic
Navistar DT408	1994-1995	408 cu in (6.7 L) I6 turbodiesel	Direct injection (mechanical)		Spicer 5-speed manual Spicer 6+1 manual Eaton-Fuller 6-speed manual Allison AT545 automatic Allison MT643 automatic Allison A2000 automatic
Navistar DTA466	1989-1994	466 cu in (7.6 L) I6 turbodiesel (aftercooled)	Direct injection (mechanical)		Spicer 5-speed manual Spicer 6+1 manual Eaton-Fuller 6-speed manual Allison AT545 automatic Allison MT643 automatic Allison A2000 automatic
Navistar DT466E	1994-2004	466 cu in (7.6 L) I6 turbodiesel (aftercooled)	Direct injection (electronic/HEUI)		Spicer 5-speed manual Spicer 6+1 manual Eaton-Fuller 6-speed manual Allison AT545 automatic Allison MT643 automatic Allison A2000 automatic
IHC 7.3L IDI	1989-1994	444 cu in (7.3 L) V8 diesel 444 cu in (7.3 L) V8 turbodiesel	Indirect injection (mechanical)		Spicer 5-speed manual Spicer 6+1 manual Eaton-Fuller 6-speed manual Allison AT545 automatic Allison MT643 automatic Allison A2000 automatic
Navistar T444E	1994-2004	444 cu in (7.3 L) V8 turbodiesel	Direct injection (electronic/HEUI)		Spicer 5-speed manual Spicer 6+1 manual Eaton-Fuller 6-speed manual Allison AT545 automatic Allison MT643 automatic Allison A2000 automatic

== Stripped chassis (1981–2024) ==
Along with its conventional-style cowled chassis, International has produced stripped-chassis variants for transit-style school buses in both front and rear-engine configurations.

=== Forward control (1981–2010) ===
Replacing the Loadstar 1853FC, the front-engine International 1853FC (FC=Forward Control) was produced from 1981 to 1989. While produced as a bare chassis, the model line shared the steering column and instrument cluster from the S-series conventionals. Unlike the S-series conventional, the chassis was powered exclusively by a diesel engine; the 9.0L V8 was the standard engine, with the DT466 I6 offered as an option.

In 1990, the 1853FC was replaced by the more advanced 3900. In a major revision of the frame, the 3900 significantly reduced the interior space required for the engine compartment (freeing up space for the driver and front stairwell), using narrower DT-series inline-6 engines exclusively. Utilized by several body manufacturers (though primarily Ward/AmTran and its IC successor), the 3900 was produced until 2010.

=== Rear-engine (1996–2024) ===
In 1996, International entered rear-engine chassis production (for the first time since the early 1970s), developing the International 3000 chassis for the AmTran RE. Sharing powertrain and chassis components with the 3800, the 3000 was designed for V8 and inline-6 engines from multiple manufacturers.

As of 2020 production, the International 3000 rear-engine chassis is the final variant of the S-series that remains in production (24 years after its release).

== Body manufacturers ==
Over its 25-year production, the S-series was bodied by many bus manufacturers, primarily for use as a school bus. The first generation chassis saw use by many manufacturers across North America, as did the 3800 during most of the 1990s.

Following the 1995 acquisition of AmTran by Navistar, school bus production began a transition, as chassis suppliers and body manufacturers began a period of joint ventures and acquisitions. During the late 1990s, the market share of International grew as several body manufacturers (Wayne and Carpenter) closed down; while Freightliner began chassis production in 1997, Ford and General Motors were gradually phased out of full-size chassis production.

At the time the 3800 ended production in 2004, the number of full-size body manufacturers from 1979 had decreased from eight to three (Blue Bird, Thomas, and IC, the successor to AmTran/Ward); International was the sole remaining chassis manufacturer (following the exit of Ford and GM, Freightliner and Blue Bird commenced production of cowled chassis).

International S-series bus chassis usage by school bus manufacturers, 1979–2004
Body manufacturer	Chassis variants					Notes
Body manufacturer	Conventional		Front-engine		Rear-engine	Notes
Body manufacturer	S1700 S1800 (1979-1989)	3700 3800 (1989-2004)	1853FC (1981-c.1989)	3900FC (1990-2010)	3000 (1996–2024)	Notes
American Transportation Corporation (AmTran)		AmTran Volunteer (1993-1996); AmTran CS (1997-1999)		AmTran Genesis (1992-1997); AmTran FE (1998-early 2002)	AmTran RE (1996-early 2002)	
Blue Bird Corporation	Blue Bird Conventional (1979-1989)	Blue Bird Conventional (1989-2004)				Replaced by Blue Bird SBCV (based on International 3300) and Blue Bird Vision.
Carpenter Body Works	Carpenter Classic (1979-1989)	Carpenter (Crown) Classic (1989-1999); Carpenter Classic 2000 (late 1999-2001)	Carpenter Cavalier (1983-1988)	Carpenter Counselor (1991-1993)		From 1996 to 1999, Carpenter used the Crown by Carpenter brand name on their buses.
Gillig Corporation	Gillig Coach (1979-1981)					The last Gillig Type C bus (Gillig Coach School Bus) was built in 1981; very few were produced.
Integrated Coach Corporation (IC)		International IC (2000–early 2002); International CE series (2002–2004)		International FE series (2002–2010)	International RE series (2002–2024)	The version of the 3800 used by IC wore a modified hood.
Les Enterprises Michel Corbeil		EMC 1st Premier ( 1990-1995); Corbeil Conventional (c.1996-c.2004)		EMC-3900 ( 1993-1999)	EMC-3900 RE (c.2000–2001)	Corbeil Type C buses were not sold in the United States.
Mid Bus						The Mid Bus SC is a school bus built on the International 3400 cutaway-cab chassis (with a truck cab and driver-side door); the SC was built during the mid-1990s.
New Bus Company	1988-1989					
Superior Coach Company	Superior Pioneer (1979–1985)					Superior ended production of Type C buses in 1985 to concentrate on Type A buses (see Mid Bus)
Thomas Built Buses, Inc.	Saf-T-Liner Conventional (1979-1989)	Saf-T-Liner Conventional (1989-2002)				
Ward Body Works	Ward Volunteer (1979-1989)	Ward Volunteer (1989-1992)	Ward President (1981-1986)	Ward Senator (1990-1992)		Non-school bus versions of the Volunteer built after 1980 were sold under the AmTran name.
Wayne Corporation	Wayne Lifeguard (1979-1989)	Wayne Lifeguard (1989-1992)		Wayne Lifestar (1991-1992)		
Wayne Wheeled Vehicles		Wayne Lifeguard (1992-1995)				

== See also ==
- International Harvester – manufacturer (S series)
- Navistar International – manufacturer (3800)
- Chevrolet/GMC B-Series – competing bus chassis
- Ford B-Series – competing bus chassis
- School Bus
- List of buses
