= Navistar T444E engine =

T444E

Overview
- Manufacturer: Navistar International
- Also called: Ford 7.3L Power Stroke
- Production: 1994–2006

Layout
- Configuration: 90° V8
- Displacement: 444 cu in (7.3 L)
- Cylinder bore: 4.11 in (104.4 mm)
- Piston stroke: 4.18 in (106.2 mm)
- Cylinder block material: Cast iron
- Cylinder head material: Cast iron
- Valvetrain: OHV, two valves per cylinder
- Compression ratio: 17.5:1

Combustion
- Turbocharger: Wastegate
- Fuel system: Direct injection and hydraulic electronic unit injection
- Fuel type: Diesel
- Cooling system: Water-cooled

Output
- Power output: 175–275 hp (130–205 kW)
- Torque output: 425–525 lb⋅ft (576–712 N⋅m)

Dimensions
- Dry weight: 920 lb (417 kg)

Chronology
- Predecessor: International Harvester IDI
- Successor: Navistar VT365; Ford 6.0L Power Stroke

The Navistar T444E is a diesel V8 engine manufactured by Navistar International Corporation. In its use in Ford Motor Company trucks, vans, and school buses, it is the first of the Power Stroke family of diesel engines. The T444E was manufactured from 1994 to 2003, replacing the 7.3L IDI V8 designed by International Harvester. As a result of its inability to meet California noise regulations, the T444E was discontinued midway through the 2003 model year, replaced by the all-new 6.0L VT365. In total, nearly 2 million 7.3L Power Stroke V8s were manufactured for Ford at Navistar's Indianapolis, Indiana, plant before switching to the 6.0L.

The T444E used a 4.11 in × 4.18 in (104.4 mm × 106.2 mm) bore and stroke. Power output was 210 hp (157 kW) at 3000 rpm and 425 lb⋅ft (576 N⋅m) at 1600 rpm for 1994-1997. Power was increased in 1998 to 235 hp (175 kW) at 2600 rpm and 500 lb⋅ft (678 N⋅m) of torque at 1600 rpm. In 2000, power was once again upped to 250 hp (186 kW) at 2700 rpm with automatic transmission and 275 hp (205 kW) with manual transmission, and 525 lb⋅ft (712 N⋅m) of torque at 1600 rpm.

Applications:

- 1994.5–1997 Ford F-250 HD, F-350, and F-Super Duty
- 1999–2003 Ford Super Duty (2001–2006 in Australia)
- 2000–2003 Ford F-650/F-750
- 2000–2003 Ford Excursion
- 1995–2003 Ford E-Series (E-350, E-450, and E-550)
- 1994–2003 International 3400/3600/3700/3800 bus chassis
- 1996–2003 International 3000 bus chassis
- 1994–2003 International 4700/4900 cab/chassis
