= Carpenter Body Company =

Defunct American bus manufacturer

Carpenter Body Works, Inc.
- Trade name: 1918–1937: Ralph H. Carpenter Body Company; 1937–1990: Carpenter Body Works, Inc.; 1990–1996: Carpenter Manufacturing Co; 1996–2001: Carpenter Industries, Inc.
- Type: Subsidiary
- Industry: Vehicle manufacturing
- Founded: 1918 in Mitchell, Indiana, United States
- Founder: Ralph H. Carpenter
- Defunct: 2001
- Fate: Dissolved by parent company
- Headquarters: Mitchell, Indiana (1919–1995); Richmond, Indiana (1995–2001)
- Area served: North America
- Key people: John A. Foddrill; Dr. Beurt SerVaas
- Products: School buses Transit buses Step vans
- Number of employees: 700+ (1997); 200 (2000)
- Parent: Spartan Motors (1998–2001)
- Website: www.crownbycarpenter.com (1999 version, archived)

Carpenter Body Works (typically referred to simply as Carpenter) was an American bus manufacturer based in Mitchell, Indiana. Founded in 1918, the company produced a variety of vehicles, with the majority of production consisting of yellow school buses for the United States and Canada.

Remaining a family-owned company into the late 1980s, Carpenter entered bankruptcy at the end of 1989 and was forced to reorganize to survive. In 1995, the company relocated to the former Wayne Corporation facilities in Richmond, Indiana; in 1996, the company rebranded its product line as "Crown by Carpenter". In 1998, Carpenter was acquired by specialty vehicle manufacturer Spartan Motors.

In early 2001, Carpenter ended vehicle production, as its market share declined further.

== History ==
=== Foundation ===
Carpenter traces its roots to 1918, in Mitchell, Indiana. Local blacksmith Ralph H. Carpenter established his own blacksmith works; at the time, part of the business involved building and repairing horse-drawn wagons. At the time, in many rural areas, these were still adapted to carry people simply with the addition of wooden benches. Inspired by the merger of two local school systems in the area near Mitchell, in 1922, Carpenter shifted from repair to construction of new bodies, constructing his first wooden-bodied "kid hack". By the mid-1920s, motorized truck chassis formed the basis of all vehicle bodies. Although still constructed primarily of wood, the new bus bodies were now reinforced by steel in the exterior and framing.

In 1935, the combination of wood and metal construction was replaced by a body built solely of steel; the roof panels were welded together instead of riveted, forming a single panel. At the same time, the company debuted an early form of the school bus stop arm, though in a much different form: instead of a stop sign, the company used a clenched fist with a red-painted index finger that was propped out from the side of the bus. In 1937, Ralph Carpenter reincorporated his business as Carpenter Body Works, expanding into a larger factory in Mitchell in 1939.

In 1939, Ralph Carpenter attended a New York conference organized by rural education professor Dr. Frank W. Cyr, who sought to develop uniform design standards for school bus manufacturers; the event led to the birth of school bus yellow. Several of Carpenter's ideas were adopted, including shatterproof safety glass, steel seat frames, and a fold-out stop sign.

In 1941, the company became one of the first publicly owned bus manufacturers. During the World War II moratorium on private-sector vehicle manufacturing, Carpenter became a bus supplier for the US Army and US Navy, becoming a source of buses for military training facilities across the United States.

In May 1947, the Carpenter factory in Mitchell, Indiana, was heavily damaged by a fire in the paint shop.

=== 1950s ===
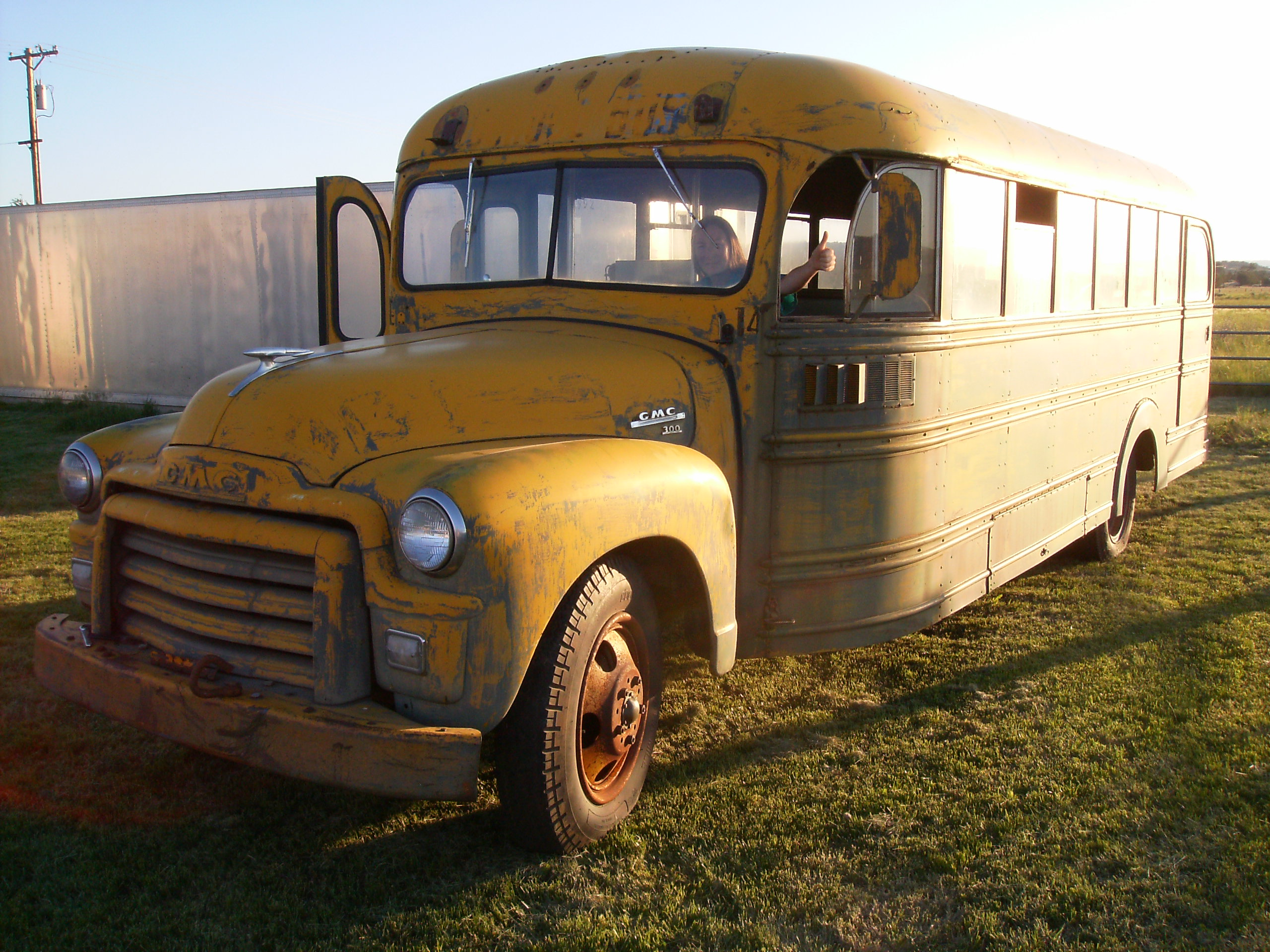
1955 Carpenter/GMC school bus

In the era following World War II, Carpenter began marketing itself under "The safest link between home and school" under the mascot of a lance-carrying knight (symbolizing the safety of its all-steel bodies); in various forms, this was used to the end of the 1980s.

In 1954, Carpenter produced its first transit-style "forward-control" bus. Similar to designs from Blue Bird and Wayne, the company used Marmon-Herrington as its chassis supplier. As with other manufacturers, Carpenter conventional-style buses in the early 1950s were available on a variety of chassis, including Chevrolet/GMC, Ford, Dodge, International Harvester, Mack, REO, Diamond T, Studebaker, and White.

In March 1956, the Mitchell, Indiana factory was again struck by fire; starting in the body-fitment station, the fire caused nearly $750,000 in damage. Much of the factory was destroyed, with the exception of the warehouse, upholstery shop, and paint shop (the source of the 1947 fire); approximately two dozen buses were driven away from the fire to safety.

With the help of factory workers, the factory was rebuilt and expanded in just 89 days. During the reconstruction, some workers worked without pay until later compensated..

=== 1960s ===
In November 1963, company founder Ralph Carpenter died at age 86. Though living part-time in Florida since World War II, Carpenter had maintained his leadership role at the company that bore his name until his death; over 55 years, the company shifted from a rural blacksmith works fixing wagons as a side business to building nearly 3,000 school buses yearly. The company continued operations as a family-owned business, with leadership transferring to his son-in-law John A. Foddrill.

To the end of the 1960s, Carpenter continued its operations as it had since the 1920s: every vehicle was essentially built one at time without an assembly line and essentially to order. Though body designs primarily varied in size and passenger capacity (coinciding with chassis manufacturers and customer specification), Carpenter allowed for an extensive range of specialization and available options for a purchaser.

In 1969, Carpenter became one of the first manufacturers to offer a downsized school bus (under 30 passengers) for smaller-scale operators. Based on the General Motors P-chassis, the Carpenter Cadet CV utilized the roof and the body of the conventional-body Carpenter from the entry door rearward; the forward portion of the Cadet was developed similar to a "stepvan". The Cadet would spawn a number of similar designs from other manufacturers, remaining in production through 1998.

At the end of the 1960s, Carpenter underwent a further expansion of its facilities (completed in 1970). Under a management objective, the raw materials used in the construction (and all labor) were sourced entirely from within Indiana (with the sole exception of carpeting).

=== 1970s ===
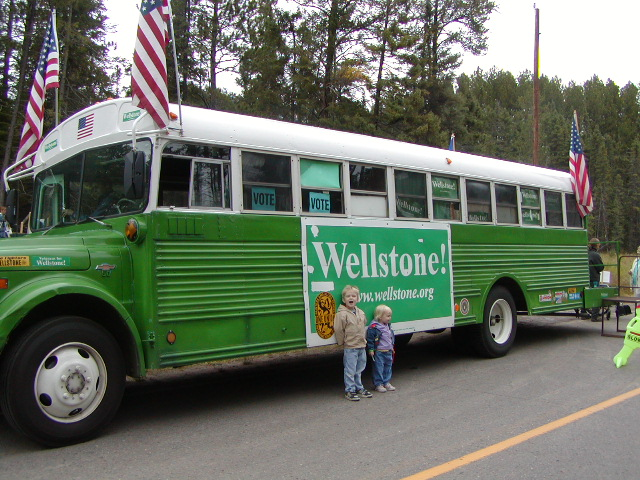
1970s Carpenter/Chevrolet conventional in use as a campaign bus

During the 1970s, Carpenter was among six major school bus manufacturers in the United States (Blue Bird, Carpenter, Superior, Thomas, Ward, Wayne) and was among four family-operated companies (Blue Bird, Carpenter, Thomas, Ward); Carpenter claimed an annual production of 6,000 vehicles annually. For conventional-chassis vehicles, its Indiana facility claimed approximate geographic centrality between Ford Motor Company, General Motors, and International Harvester.

In 1970, Carpenter upgraded its transit-style school buses with the introduction of the Corsair, with a diesel-fuel engine becoming an option for the first time. The Marmon-Herrington chassis was replaced by an Oshkosh chassis for the front-engine Corsair; the rear-engine Corsair sourced its chassis from Hendrickson; both versions shared a wraparound curved "fishbowl" windshield. The same year, Carpenter sold 24 buses to Nicaragua, with their new owners driving the vehicles over 4,000 miles home on the Pan-American Highway.

In 1972, Carpenter removed metal-backed seats from its school buses, replacing them with fully padded seats; the design was modified further as all school buses were required to comply with FMVSS 222 in April 1977.

During much of 1978, production at the Mitchell, Indiana facility was halted by a six-month long labor strike lasting from February to August.

=== 1980s ===
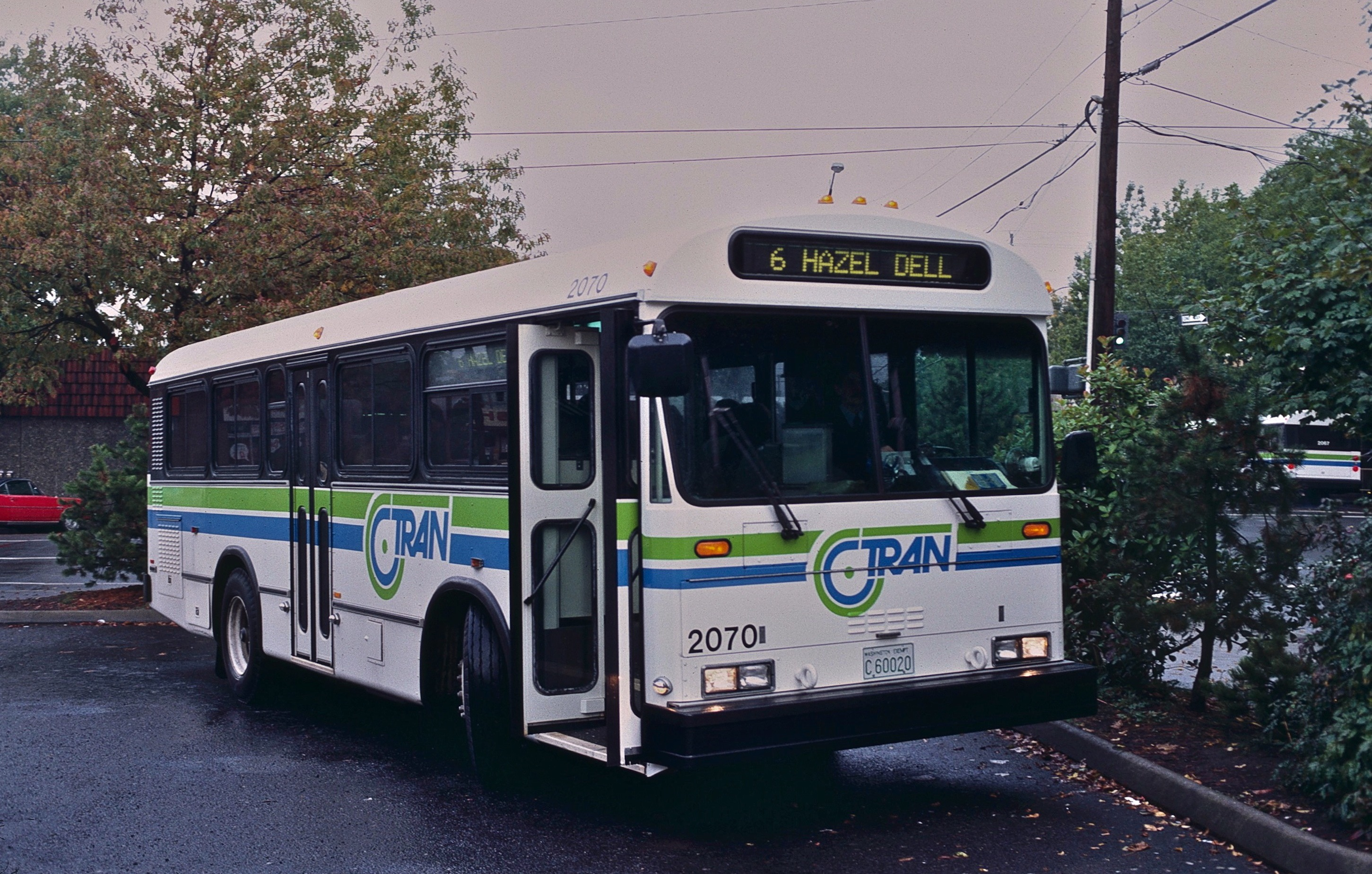
A CBW 300 transit-style bus, built in 1984

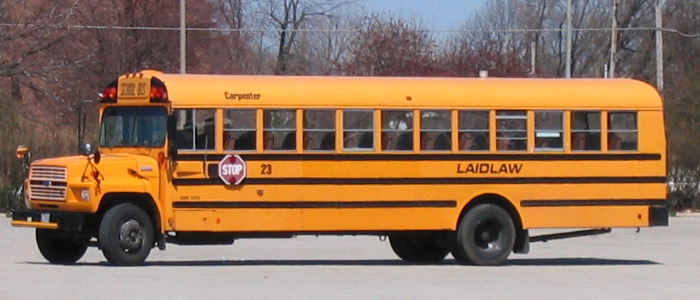
Late 1980s-early 1990s Carpenter Classic on Ford B800 chassis

As the 1980s began, school bus manufacturing became critically affected by the same factor that previously drove its success: the end of the baby boomer generation (that had attended schools since the early 1950s) was on the verge of completing their secondary education. Coupled with the unstable economy of the time, the bus manufacturing industry faced manufacturing overcapacity stemming from lowered product demand (as student population growth began to level off).

In 1981, Carpenter made its first move expanding beyond its Mitchell, Indiana home. After securing over $1 million in loans, the company opened a machine shop in North Vernon, Indiana; the facility was also opened in response to the 1978 strike. To diversify production beyond its school bus lines, Carpenter introduced the CBW transit bus. A rear-engine mass-transit bus designed in 30 and 35-feet lengths, large orders for the CBW were received from the Southern California Rapid Transit District (Los Angeles), the Chicago Transit Authority and New Orleans RTA.

During the first half of the 1980s, the company began to modernize its school bus range. For 1983, the Cavalier replaced the front-engine Corsair, adopting the International 1853FC chassis (making a diesel engine standard). Sharing parts of its design with the CBW, the Cavalier upgraded driver visibility and ergonomics over its predecessor; as it was sold in limited numbers, the rear-engine Corsair remained in production. During 1984, the Carpenter conventional-body school bus (renamed the Classic) underwent its most extensive updates in nearly 20 years, distinguished by nearly-flat bodywork above the windshield and rear windows. In 1985, Carpenter introduced its smallest school bus, with the Carpenter Clipper using a cutaway van chassis (primarily the dual rear-wheel Chevrolet/GMC G30).

Though less volatile than the 1978 strike, operations for Carpenter faced further instability as the 1980s progressed. After selling fewer than 150 units, Carpenter closed down its CBW transit bus line during 1984. In 1985, the company opened a chassis-manufacturing plant in Seymour, Indiana, but would close it within a year of opening. While the North Vernon plant opened in 1981 was intended to support the Mitchell factory, the operation ultimately worked the other way around. As the facility never produced a profit for the company, Carpenter idled the North Vernon facility after 1986 (even at a cost of over $1 million yearly), ending all operations at North Vernon in 1988.

For 1989, Carpenter introduced a new front-engine bus, replacing the Cavalier with the Counselor; along with moving to a GMC-produced chassis, the Counselor was designed with a larger front windshield. After nearly two decades, the rear-engine Corsair was produced for the last time.

In December 1989, Carpenter Body Works was forced by its creditors to declare Chapter 11 bankruptcy, facing nearly $14 million in unpaid debt (including nearly $400,000 of its 1981 loan). During the 1980s, the company became the third of the six major manufacturers to undergo bankruptcy, following Ward Body Works (reorganizing as AmTran in 1980; exists today as IC Bus) and Superior Coach (liquidated by its parent company in 1980 and split into several entities, ending large bus production).

=== 1990s ===
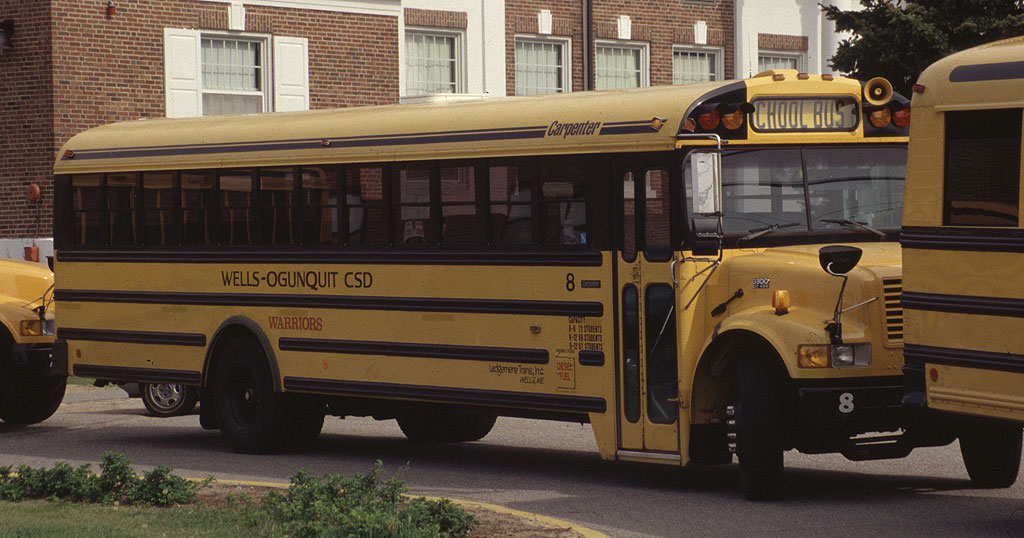
1994–1995 Carpenter Classic on International 3800 chassis

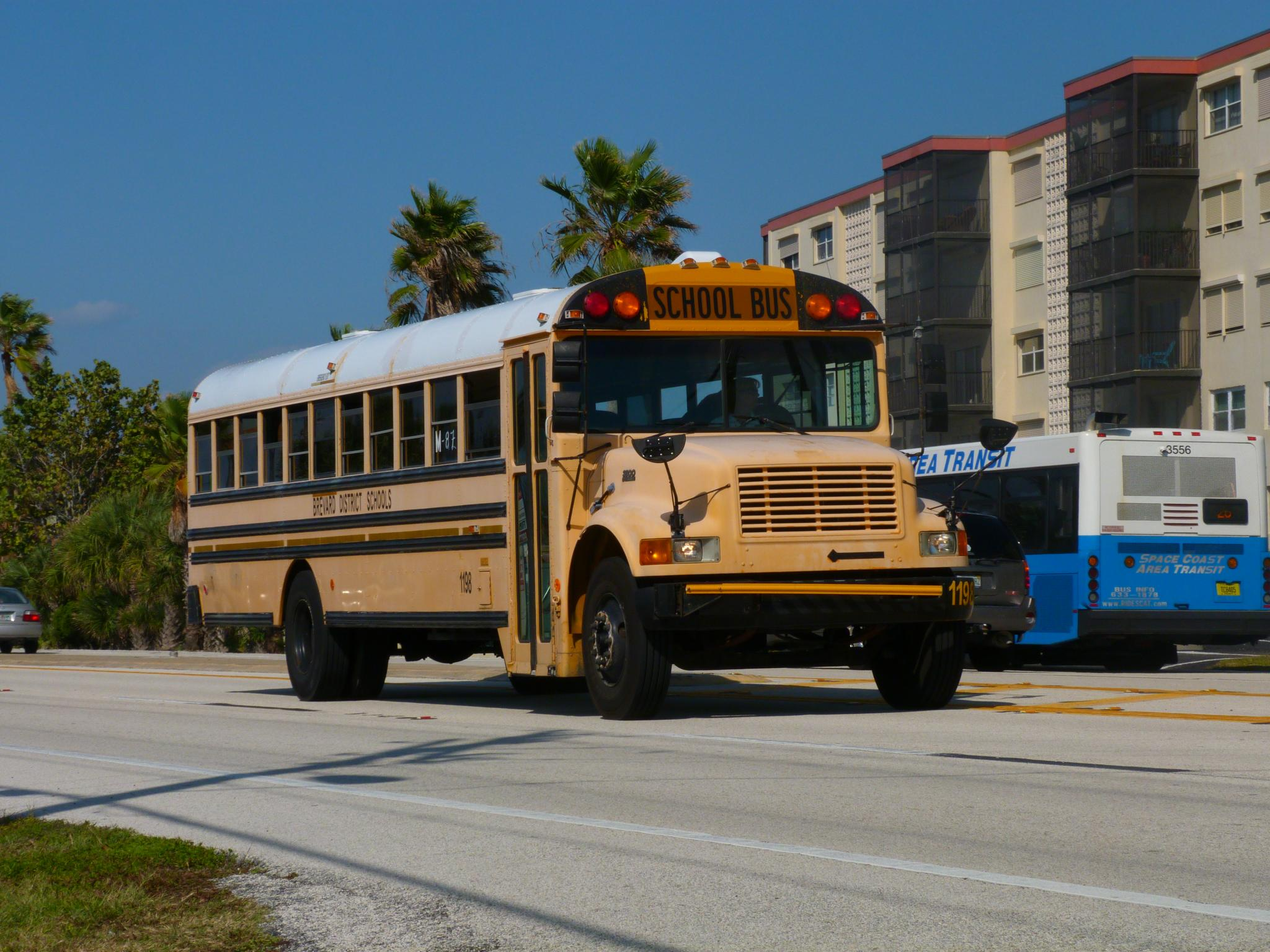
1996–1997 Crown by Carpenter Classic on International 3800 chassis

In 1990, Indianapolis-based businessman Dr. Beurt SerVaas formed a holding company (CBW, Inc) to acquire Carpenter Body Works. Although the company board (consisting primarily of the Foddrill family and supporters) were in favor of the acquisition (as it would avoid liquidation of the company and the end of operations), the labor force initially rejected the proposal, as it required massive labor concessions. During March 1990, production was idled altogether and over 300 employees were laid off during negotiations. CBW, Inc. acquired Carpenter Body Works in late April 1990 for a sale price of $5 million (paid through 2002), with CBW assuming the financial obligations of the existing company. The Foddrill family transferred leadership to Dr. SerVaas; after 72 years, Carpenter was no longer a family-operated business (leaving only Blue Bird and Thomas as such). At the time of the acquisition, Dr. SerVaas referred to the product line as the Cadillac of school buses". The company began a series of moves to improve its financial health, including the sale of its closed manufacturing facilities (avoiding foreclosure) and a renegotiated labor contract. Under its new ownership, Carpenter Body Works was quietly renamed Carpenter Manufacturing Company.

In May 1991, Carpenter purchased tooling, product rights, and intellectual property of California-based Crown Coach (which had closed two months before). At the time, the company sought to use the assets to revive production of the Crown Supercoach Series II to replace the Corsair for 1992. The plan was ultimately shelved, as Carpenter deemed the complexity of the unibody chassis and aluminum-panel body too expensive (Crown sold the Series II for over $125,000 in 1990). Though the Supercoach Series II would not (ever) re-enter production, Carpenter did pay attention to its design, as the bus that ultimately replaced the Corsair did adopt several elements of its design.

For 1992, Carpenter released the Coach RE (Rear Engine), its first new rear-engine bus since 1970. Though of more traditional design than the Crown Series II (a separate ladder frame and steel body panels), the Coach still bore multiple similarities, including the vertical configuration of its taillamps (moving to round lenses), its headlamp configuration, and its standard 6V92 Detroit Diesel engine. The Carpenter Coach was also the first school bus to utilize a chassis produced by specialty manufacturer Spartan Motors. Coinciding with a minor update, the Carpenter Clipper was renamed as the Carpenter Classmate. For 1994, the Classmate was joined by a single rear-wheel bus, as Carpenter entered into a joint venture with Quebec-based manufacturer Corbeil to distribute vehicles in the United States.

In 1994, Carpenter underwent a major change, as the company acquired a new home. Approximately 120 miles northeast of Mitchell, Carpenter leased the shuttered facilities of Wayne Corporation (closed in 1992) in Richmond, Indiana, transitioning its entire workforce there by the end of 1995. The move brought Carpenter to a larger, more advanced facility, and it also inherited a considerable amount of leadership and workforce of the former Wayne operations, bringing considerable experience and knowledge of the plant and industry to the effort.

For 1996 production, the move to Richmond began to make its appearance in Carpenter vehicle design. To return some previous tooling to use that it inherited from previous Wayne production, the Carpenter Classic adopted some parts of the Wayne Lifeguard, including its larger windshield, split entry door (giving it larger windows), and its drivers' control panel. Less visibly, Carpenter made structural upgrades to the body, adding single-piece roof bows and an additional full-length rub rail. As a result of both the design and tooling change, 1996 and later Carpenters became unrelated to units containing a crucial structural flaw (see below). That situation was not envisioned by anyone then and would only become an issue nearly a decade in the future.

==== Crown by Carpenter (1996–99) ====
Crown by Carpenter business logo

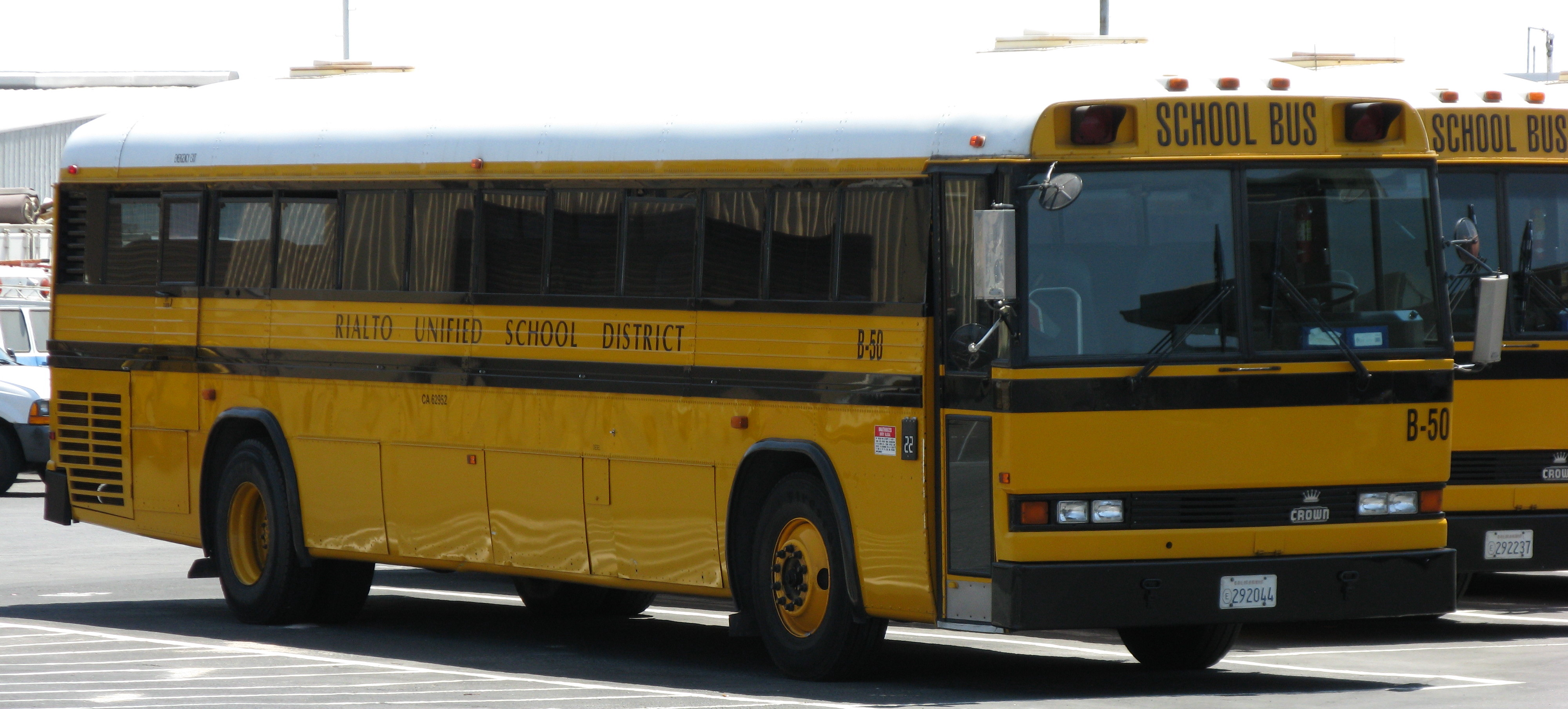
Crown Supercoach Series II (1990), the design Carpenter acquired in its purchase of Crown Coach.

As part of the 1991 purchase of the Crown Coach intellectual property, Carpenter inherited the rights to the Crown brand name. After 1993, the Carpenter Coach RE was withdrawn, but the company held onto all the Crown Coach assets. For the second half of the 1990s, the Crown name returned to school bus production, as Carpenter used it to rebrand itself during its relocation to Richmond, Indiana. Though legally trading as Carpenter Industries, Inc. (replacing Carpenter Manufacturing), Carpenter marketed its vehicles under the "Crown by Carpenter" brand name; the knight-and-lance emblem (largely relegated to company literature) was retired completely, replaced by an emblem introduced by Crown Coach in 1989.

Alongside the newly updated Crown by Carpenter Classic, the company continued to market the Classmate dual and single rear-wheel buses (the latter, built by Corbeil) and the Cadet small bus. The Counselor transit-style school bus underwent the same design changes as the Classic, becoming the Crown FE/Crown RE. The Crown RE featured an industry-first rear-mounted emergency door (as an option), replacing the emergency exit window typical of rear-engine school buses. To make the design possible, the body of the Crown RE adopted an upward-angled floor (built over the engine compartment). Carpenter also marketed commercial-use variants of its school buses (also under the Crown by Carpenter name). In 1998, Carpenter developed a Crown delivery truck loosely derived from its Cadet Type B school bus line.

In exchange for cash payment of the development of the Crown FE/RE, Carpenter offered chassis manufacturer Spartan Motors a one-third stake of the company in 1996. At the beginning of 1997, Spartan invested over $30 million of capital in Carpenter, with SerVaas, Inc. retaining a stake in the company. In the summer of 1998, Carpenter Industries was forced to cease operations for three months; in response, Spartan Motors doubled its stake in the company, becoming the majority shareholder in October 1998. To return Carpenter to profitability, Spartan installed several new management members to the company.

=== 2000–2001 ===
Carpenter Classic 2000 school bus
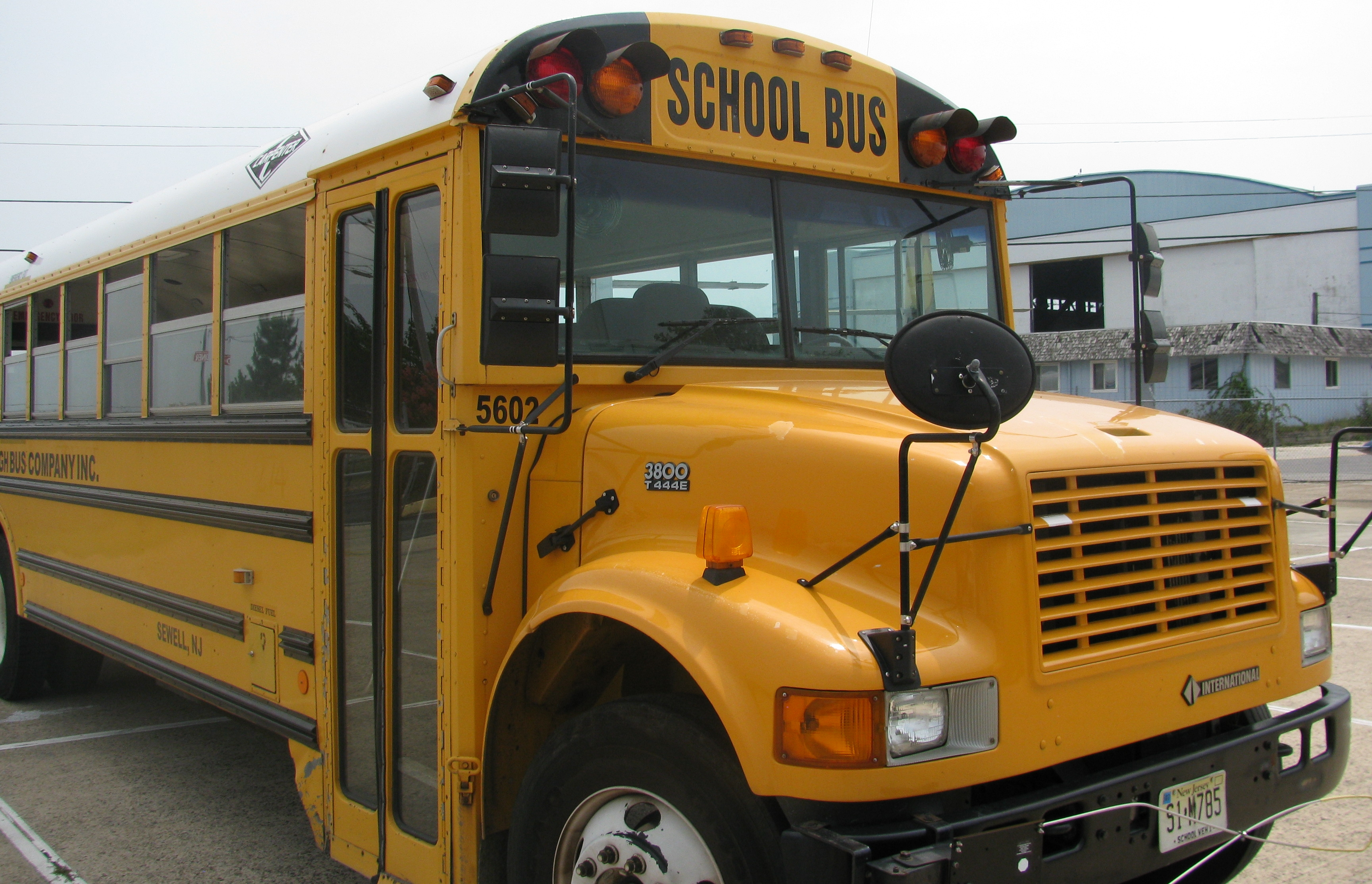
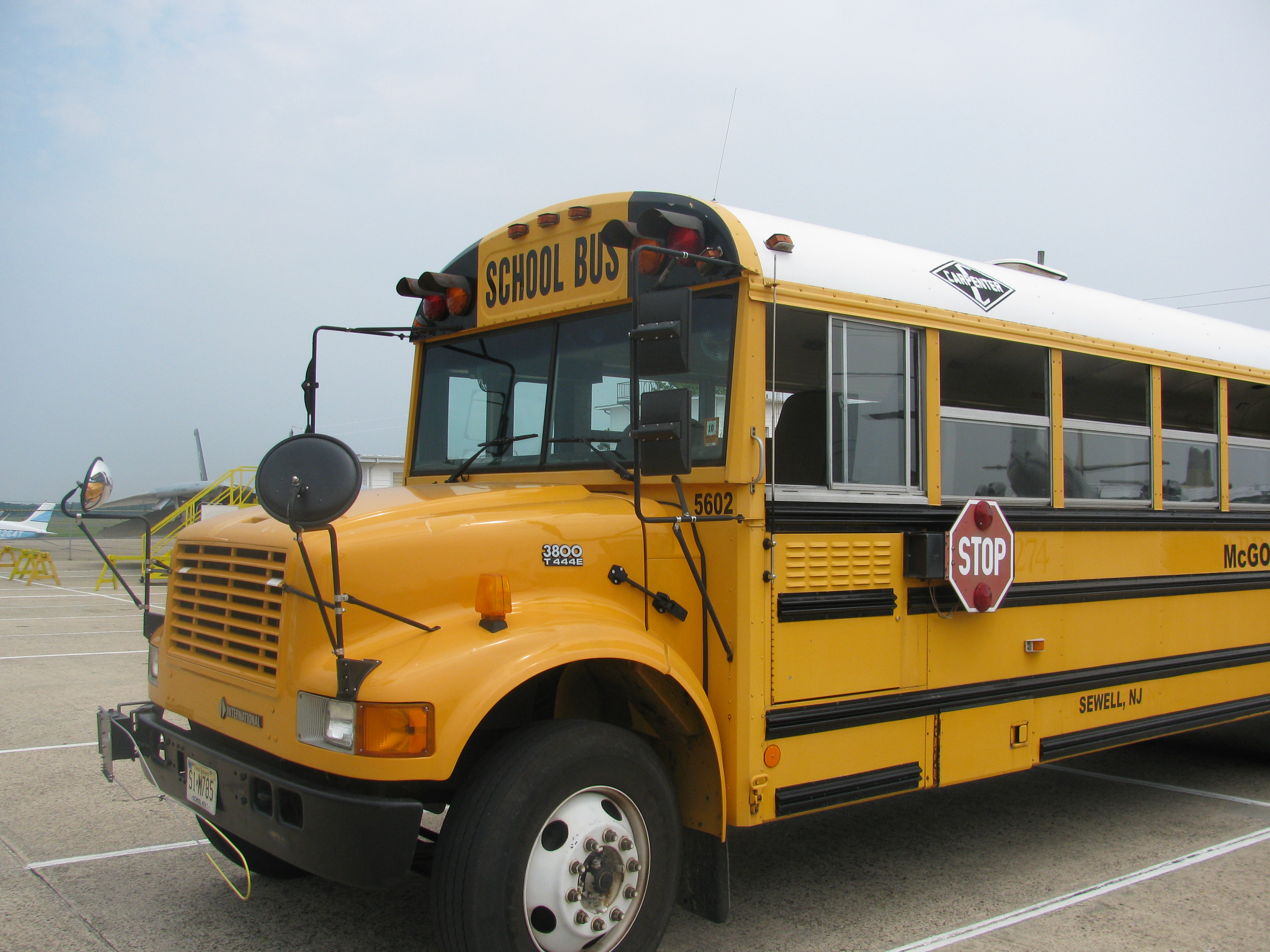
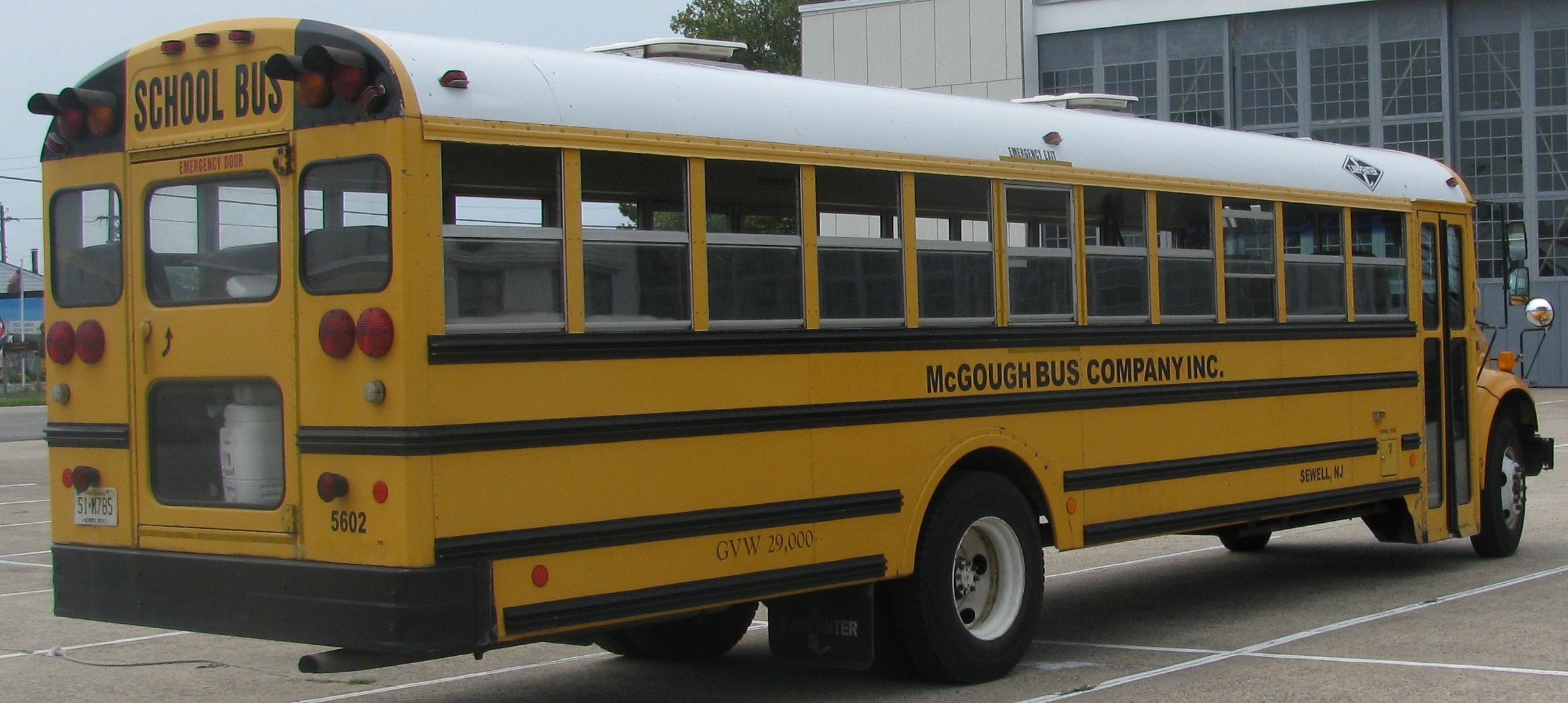
International 3800 chassis

Following its return to production at the end of 1998, Carpenter Industries rebuilt its business strategy entirely. The "Crown by Carpenter" branding was retired (though the Crown Coach assets were not sold), with the company reverting to Carpenter; to reflect the change, an all-new "black diamond" company emblem was directly derived from the Spartan Motors emblem. Production of vehicles was retained in the former Wayne facilities in Richmond, Indiana.

For Carpenter to become competitive in the 21st century, the company refocused its objectives away from production goals and market share towards leadership in quality, innovation, and design. Abandoning small buses altogether, Carpenter ended production of the Classmate and Cadet buses (along with its distribution venture with Corbeil). For its relaunch, the company announced its product range would be initially limited to a full-size conventional bus, with transit-style school buses subsequently developed only as a secondary effort.

In late 1999, Carpenter released the Classic 2000 conventional-style bus, marking the most extensive changes to its body design since the early 1970s. While visibly similar to both the early 1990s Classic and its Crown by Carpenter namesake, the Classic 2000 underwent a complete structural redesign, distinguished by its fully vertical rear body and redesigned windshield; the Wayne Lifeguard again shared its entry door (in modified form) and nearly its entire set of driver's controls.

In early 2000, Carpenter released the front-engine Carpenter Chancellor, replacing the Crown FE; featuring the same structural changes as the Classic 2000, the Chancellor again used a Spartan Motors chassis.

Following its the approval of its liquidation by Spartan Motors, Carpenter continued operations to fulfill its existing customer orders. In March 2001, the final vehicle was produced, nearly 80 years after Ralph Carpenter produced his first wood-bodied school wagon.

==== Carpenter Chancellor RE (2001) ====
During early 2000, Carpenter previewed a rear-engine version of the Chancellor as its third, flagship model line, intended for 2001 production. In contrast to its predecessors, the Chancellor RE differed substantially from its front-engine counterpart beyond its engine layout. While the rear emergency door option of its Crown RE predecessor was removed, the Chancellor brought new innovations with its design. Its Spartan chassis used double frame rails; through the use of smaller-diameter wheels (19" vs. the standard 22.5"), the interior was designed with a full-length flat floor. Other standard features included independent front suspension with air ride for both axles. Coinciding with the closure of the company, only a single prototype was completed along with a second rolling chassis (intended for display).

== Closure ==
Final Carpenter logo (late 1999–early 2001)

For the final two decades of its existence, Carpenter had struggled through a variety of factors: declining market share, company finances, and damages to its reputation. The company also struggled to compete in a market segment facing larger-scale issues of stagnant demand and production overcapacity.

Carpenter began losing money on a large scale during the end of the 1970s, ultimately leading to its 1989 bankruptcy and 1990 acquisition. Following its initial reorganization, the company maintained a degree of liquidity, but without a long-term future. In contrast with its remaining competitors (AmTran and Thomas, with Blue Bird doing so through a different venture), Carpenter did not align itself with a major truck manufacturer during the 1990s to secure conventional truck chassis. Though the company had been affiliated with Spartan Motors since 1992 (introducing Spartan to school bus chassis production), Carpenter sourced Spartan chassis for transit-style school buses (a distinct minority of school bus production). In contrast to Ford (later Freightliner), General Motors, and International, Spartan was a specialty manufacturer that produced chassis for recreational vehicles and fire and rescue apparatus accustomed to premium markets with lower quantities and higher margins; school buses were sold under distinct pressures for low pricing (regardless of sales volume). The Spartan-chassis Carpenter Chancellor was well received by the industry for both its design innovations and its potential for premium quality. The design approach proved a fatal downside to its launch, as incorporating both aspects also meant placing the company at a competitive disadvantage in pricing (a factor that largely ended school bus production of Crown Coach and Gillig).

At the beginning of October 2000, Spartan approved the liquidation of Carpenter, leading to the final closure of the company in early 2001 after completing all customer orders. While Spartan acknowledged that its investment in Carpenter would have become a long-term success, it had yet to make a profit in the venture and continued school bus production was placing the entirety of Spartan Motors under financial risk; in total, the closure of Carpenter cost Spartan over $7 million.

Carpenter became the third of the six major school bus manufacturers to close its doors (following Superior and Wayne); less than a year later, AmTran was renamed by its parent company (ultimately becoming IC Bus).

In 2011, Spartan reentered school bus production, serving as the chassis supplier for Autobus Lion (today LION), moving to a cowled-chassis design for the first time; since 2015, the chassis has produced nearly exclusively as a battery-electric vehicle.

=== Epilogue: Body structure concerns ===
On March 20, 2003, a Carpenter school bus rolled over onto its roof in Alachua County, Florida; at the time of the rollover, no passengers were on board the 83-passenger bus and the driver survived the accident (with severe injuries). In the rollover of the bus, the internal roof structure failed, causing much of the roof to collapse down to the level of the seats. Under FMVSS220, during a rollover, a school bus roof structure is required to support 1½ times the weight of the vehicle with only 5 inches of vertical displacement.

Following the rollover accident, inspections of the accident vehicle revealed a large number of cracked and broken welds in the roof structure. Subsequent inspection of Carpenter buses by operators in various parts of the United States revealed similar failed welds in their roof structure; the problem was not unique to the crash vehicle in Florida. The buses affected were units assembled by Carpenter in its Mitchell, Indiana facility prior to its 1995 closure; though the roof design was shared by approximately 15,000 vehicles, a large number were presumed to have been retired from service at the time of the accident. The Crown by Carpenter and Carpenter buses built in Richmond, Indiana from 1996 to 2001 used a different design for their roof structure (extending the roof bows to floor level) and were not found to have any related issues with cracked or broken roof welds.

The 2001 closure of Carpenter posed several problems to resolving the safety issue. In a normal case, National Highway Traffic Safety Administration (NHTSA) would have used the preliminary findings as part of a full-scale investigation. If the findings found any kind of manufacturers defect, a safety recall of the vehicles involved would be ordered by NHTSA. As Carpenter was no longer in operation (and with no successor company in existence), that procedure was impossible, as there was no one for NHTSA to hold accountable for the design problem.

While unable to offer a recall, NHTSA responded to its roof structure concern by releasing several advisories regarding Carpenter buses produced in Mitchell, Indiana. In notifying Carpenter bus operators its recommendation to inspect their own buses for cracked and broken welds in the roof structure, NHTSA clarified that not all details behind the design and construction of the roof layout could ever be made available; it also noted that it could not advise repair unilaterally. For Carpenter buses that were found to have failed roof welds, NHTSA recommended the replacement of the vehicle; if retirement from service was not practical, NHTSA advised professional repair of the failed welds and restriction of the vehicle to low-speed use (minimizing its potential for rollover); a school bus industry organization went further, advising operators to remove affected Carpenter buses from front-line service entirely (restricted to reserve use).

To avoid resale of the affected vehicles to the public, NHTSA advised that the title of Carpenter buses removed from service to be branded as "scrap".

== Products ==
Carpenter produced a product lineup of both small and full-size buses. Like other school bus manufacturers, the company also produced commercial, shuttle, and transit bus derivatives of their school bus designs. The Carpenter Cadet, introduced in 1969, was one of the first Type B school buses; during the Crown by Carpenter era, a modified version of the Cadet was marketed as a delivery van.

With the exception of "Classic", its Type C conventional and "Coach", its Type D rear-engine transit style (influenced by Crown Coach), most Carpenter school buses derived their model names from themes in education (Classmate, Cadet, Counselor, Chancellor) while many transit-style Carpenters derived their model names from common team names (Corsair, Cavalier).

Carpenter/Crown by Carpenter product line
Model name	Production	Vehicle type	Chassis	Notes
Clipper Classmate Commuter (commercial)	Clipper: c.1985–91 Classmate: 1992–98	Type A (cutaway)	General Motors Corporation; Chevrolet G30/GMC Vandura (to 1996); Chevrolet Express/GMC Savana (1997–99); Ford Motor Company; Ford Econoline/Ford E-Series (to 1999)	During a minor update for 1992, the Clipper was renamed the Classmate.; Sold only in dual-rear wheel configuration.; Commuter: commercial variant of Classmate.
Cadet Crown by Carpenter Concourse (commercial)	P30 chassis: 1969–98; Spartan chassis: 1997–98	Type B (integrated)	General Motors: Chevrolet/GMC P30; Spartan Motors	For 1996–98, larger versions of the Cadet were sold based upon a Spartan Motors chassis.; Crown by Carpenter-produced delivery vans loosely based on the Cadet bus.; Concourse: commercial variant of Cadet.
Classic Courier (commercial)	c. 1960s–1999	Type C (conventional)	Chrysler Corporation: Dodge S-Series (to 1977); Ford Motor Company: Ford B series (to 1998); Freightliner: Freightliner FS-65 (1997–1999); General Motors Corporation: Chevrolet/GMC B-Series (to 1991); International Harvester; Navistar International: International Harvester Loadstar (1962–78); IHC/International S-series "Schoolmaster" (1979–89); International 3700/3800 (1989–1999)	Crown by Carpenter Classic featured redesigned body sides and Wayne Lifeguard entry door and windshield.; Freightliner FS-65 version built with 4-piece windshield.; Crown by Carpenter Courier sold as a commercial-segment variant.
Classic 2000	1999–2001	Type C (conventional)	Freightliner Custom Chassis Corporation Freightliner FS-65 Navistar International International 3800	Classic 2000 body featured same body as Chancellor Type D buses.; Interior featured Wayne Lifeguard dashboard and control panel (padded above instrument panel).; Available with single-pane windshield as an option.
Corsair	Front-engine: to 1983; Rear-engine: to 1991	Type D (transit-style): front engine; rear engine	Corsair FE; Oshkosh; International Harvester; Hendrickson; Corsair RE; Hendrickson	
Cavalier	1983–88	Type D (transit-style): front engine	International Harvester; IHC 1853FC	
Coach RE	1992–93	Type D (transit-style): rear engine	Spartan Motors; Crane Carrier Corporation	
Counselor Crown FE/RE Coastline (RE commercial)	FE: 1989–99; RE: 1994–99	Type D (transit-style): front engine; rear engine	General Motors; Chevrolet/GMC S7 (FE); Navistar International; International 3900 (FE); Spartan Motors (FE and RE); Cummins 6BT 5.9L (1997)*	During its production by Crown by Carpenter, the Crown RE became the first rear-engine school bus with a full-size emergency door (in place of the rear emergency window); Crown FE and Crown RE sold as Crown Continental and Crown Coastline commercial buses.
Chancellor	2000–01	Type D (transit-style): front engine; rear engine	Spartan Motors	The Chancellor FE was introduced in late 1999.; The Chancellor RE was introduced for the 2001 model year.

== Survivors ==
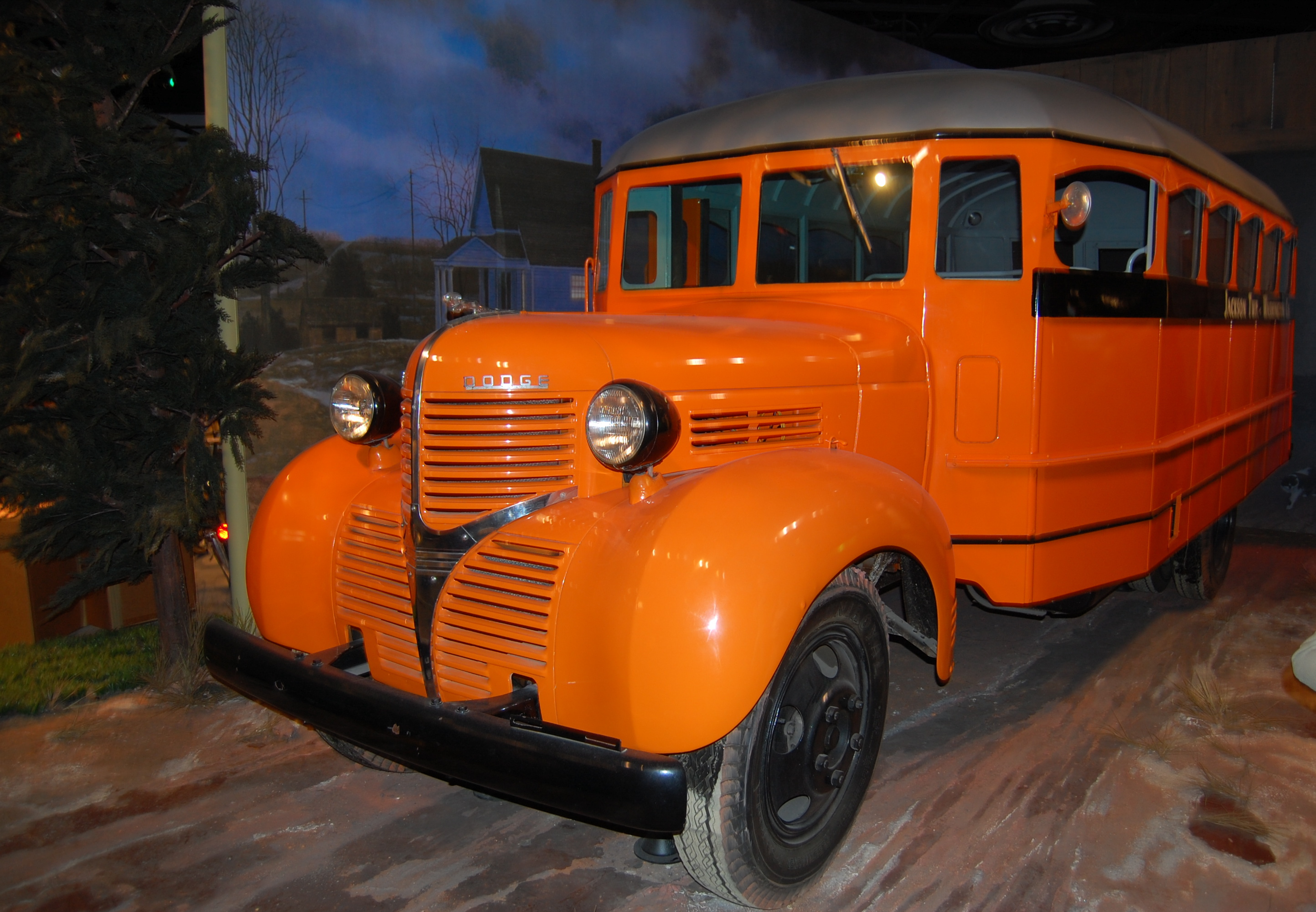
A 1939 Carpenter school bus, built on a Dodge chassis, on display at the National Museum of American History

The Smithsonian Institution's National Museum of American History in Washington, DC has a thirty-six passenger school bus built by Carpenter Body Works in 1936 on a chassis made by Dodge in 1939. The bus carried students to the grade school in Martinsburg, Indiana from 1940 to 1946, and was owned and driven by Russell Bishop during that period. It was later used as a traveling grocery store until 1962.

The bus has a streamlined steel body painted double-deep or "Omaha" orange with black trim. It was restored by Carpenter in the early 1980s under the supervision of Ollie Eager, who was Carpenter's plant manager in 1936, and John Foddrill, who worked in the Carpenter plant in 1936. The bus has replacement seats that do not match the originals exactly. The originals were black upholstery.
