= Ford Power Stroke engine =

Power Stroke engine
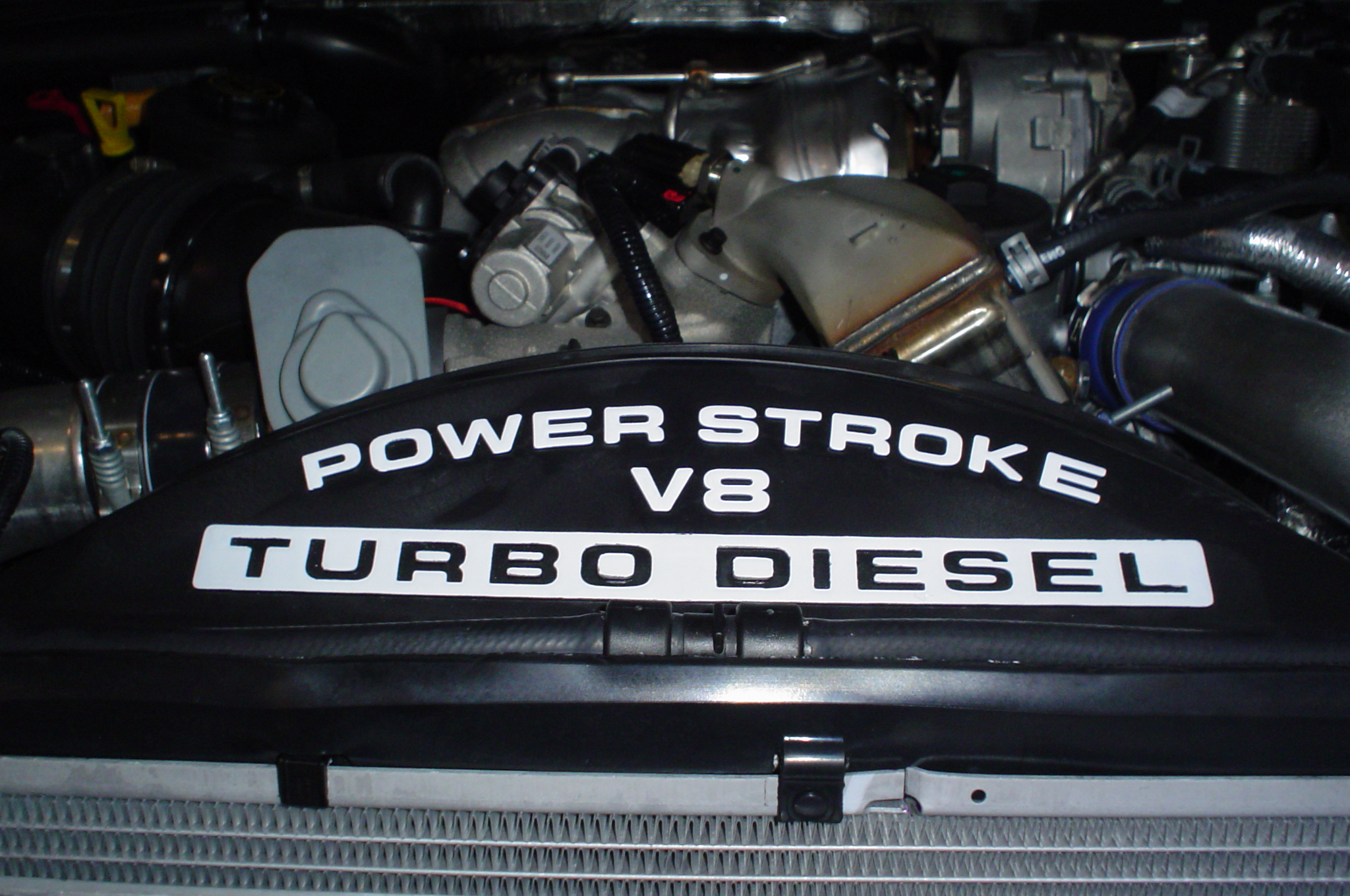
- 6.4 Powerstroke as installed in a Ford Super Duty

Overview
- Manufacturer: Navistar International (1994–2010); Ford Motor Company (2011–present)
- Also called: Ford Powerstroke
- Production: 1994–present

Layout
- Configuration: 90° V8, Inline-5, V6
- Displacement: 3.0 L (183 cu in); 3.2 L (195 cu in); 6.0 L (365 cu in); 6.4 L (389 cu in); 6.7 L (406 cu in); 7.3 L (444 cu in)
- Cylinder bore: 3.74 in (95 mm); 3.87 in (98.3 mm); 3.9 in (99.1 mm); 4.11 in (104.4 mm)
- Piston stroke: 4.13 in (105 mm); 4.18 in (106.2 mm); 4.25 in (108 mm)
- Cylinder block material: Cast iron (7.3, 6.0, 6.4 L); Compacted graphite iron (6.7 L)
- Cylinder head material: Cast iron Aluminum (reverse flow)
- Valvetrain: OHV, DOHC 4 valves × cyl.
- Valvetrain drive system: Gear (7.3, 6.0, 6.4, 6.7 L); Belt (3.0 L)
- Compression ratio: 17.5:1, 18.0:1

Combustion
- Turbocharger: Single Garrett variable-geometry with wastegate and air-to-air intercooler
- Fuel system: HEUI direct injection (7.3, 6.0L); Common rail injection (6.4, 6.7L)
- Fuel type: Diesel
- Oil system: High-pressure oil pump
- Cooling system: Water-cooled

Output
- Power output: 210–500 hp (157–373 kW)
- Torque output: 350–1,200 lb⋅ft (475–1,627 N⋅m)

Dimensions
- Dry weight: ≈920–2,463 lb (417–1,117 kg)

Emissions
- Emissions control systems: Bosch DPF, EGR, Denoxtronic-based SCR, and DOC

Chronology
- Predecessor: International Harvester IDI (1983–1994)

Power Stroke, also known as Powerstroke, is a family of diesel engines that were produced by Navistar International from 1994 until 2010, and by Ford Motor Company since 2011. Along with its use in Navistar's medium-duty trucks and in the Ford F-Series (including Ford Super Duty trucks), applications include the Ford E-Series, Ford Excursion, and Ford LCF commercial truck, and South American production of the Ford Ranger.

From 1994 until 2010, Power Stroke engines sold by Ford were re-branded versions of Navistar International medium-duty truck engines. Since the 2011 introduction of the 6.7 L Power Stroke V8, Ford has designed and produced its own diesel engines. The Power Stroke engine range has been marketed against large-block V8 (and V10) gasoline engines along with the General Motors Duramax V8 and the Dodge Cummins B-Series inline six.

== Engine family list ==
Nominal	Family	Configuration	Turbocharger	Production
7.3	Navistar T444E	444 cu in (7.3 L) 16-valve V8	Single, wastegated	1994 1/2–2003
6.0	Navistar VT365	365 cu in (6.0 L) 32-valve V8	Single, variable-geometry	2003 1/2–2007 (Super Duty) 2003 1/2–2010 (E-Series)
6.4	Navistar MaxxForce 7	389 cu in (6.4 L) 32-valve V8	Compound, variable-geometry	2008–2010
6.7	Ford Scorpion	406 cu in (6.7 L) 32-valve V8	Single, variable-geometry (Twin-scroll Turbocharger)	2011–present
3.2	Ford Duratorq (Puma)	195 cu in (3.2 L) 20-valve I5	Single, variable-geometry	2015–present
3.0	Ford Power Stroke	183 cu in (3.0 L) 24-valve V6	Single, variable-geometry	2018–2021

== 7.3 Power Stroke ==
The first engine to bear the Power Stroke name, the 7.3 L Power Stroke V8 is the Ford version of the Navistar T444E turbo-diesel V8. Introduced in 1994 as the replacement for the 7.3 L IDI V8, the Power Stroke/T444E is a completely new design, with only its bore and stroke dimensions common with its predecessor (resulting in its identical 444 cu in (7.3 L) displacement). In line with the IDI diesel, the Power Stroke was offered in three-quarter-ton and larger versions of the Ford F-Series and Econoline product ranges.

The Power Stroke is an electronically controlled, direct injection engine with a 4.11 in × 4.18 in (104.4 mm × 106.2 mm) bore and stroke creating a displacement of 444 cu in (7.3 L). It has a 17.5:1 compression ratio, and a dry weight of approximately 920 lb (417 kg). This engine produces up to 250 hp (186 kW) and 505 lb⋅ft (685 N⋅m) of torque in automatic transmission trucks from the last years of production, and 275 hp (205 kW) and 525 lb⋅ft (712 N⋅m) of torque in manual transmission trucks. The oil pan holds 15 US qt (14 L; 12 imp qt) while the top end (due to the HPOP) holds an additional 3 US qt (2.8 L; 2.5 imp qt), making for a total of 18 US qt (17 L; 15 imp qt) of oil contained within the engine.

The 1994.5 to 1996/97 DI Power Stroke has "single shot" HEUI (hydraulically actuated electronic unit injection) fuel injectors which were AA code injectors unless from California where as they received AB code injectors. It ran a high pressure oil pump (HPOP) to create the necessary oil pressure to fire the fuel injectors. This generation of Power Stroke utilizes an HPOP with a 15° swash plate angle. The 1995-1997 trucks use a two-stage cam-driven fuel pump, whereas the 1999-2003 trucks use a frame rail mounted electric fuel pump. The 1999–2003 trucks also had a deadhead fuel system and a "long lead" injector in cyl. number 8 due to lower fuel pressures with the deadhead design (AE code injector). The California trucks from 1996 and 1997 have a 120 cc (7.3 cu in) split-shot fuel injectors; other trucks did not get split-shot injectors until 1999. Single-shot injectors only inject one charge of fuel per cycle, whereas the split-shot injector releases a preliminary light load before the main charge to initiate combustion in a more damped manner. This "pre-injection" helps reduce the sharp combustion 'knock' as well as lower NO_{x} emissions by creating a more complete burn.

1994.5–1997 engines utilize a single turbocharger, non-wastegated, with a turbine housing size of 1.15 A/R. For 1999, an air-to-air intercooler was added to cool the charged air from the turbo for increased air density. With the new cooler, denser air would increase the horsepower potential of the engine, while also reducing exhaust gas temperatures (EGT). The turbine housing was changed to a .84 A/R and a wastegate was added halfway through the 1999 model year. The 1999 engine also received 140 cc (8.5 cu in) injectors, up from 120 cc (7.3 cu in) in the early model engine. With the larger injectors, the HPOP capability was increased by utilizing a 17° swash plate angle to meet the requirements of the new, higher flowing injectors.

The engine used forged connecting rods until powdered metal rods were introduced for early 2002 models. Serial numbers can be seen with the aid of a borescope to confirm the changeover between the 2001 and 2002 model years. These new connecting rods sufficed in an unmodified engine, but would become a potentially catastrophic failure point if aftermarket tuning pushed the engine above 450 hp (336 kW). Early models did not use any form of exhaust aftertreatment, such as a catalytic converter, as emissions were not enforced on diesel engines; however, by mid-year 2002, Ford began installing catalytic converters as part of the OEM exhaust as part of the Tier 1–3 standards.

=== Common issues ===
Despite being regarded as one of the most reliable diesel engines ever put in a light-duty truck, the engine had its own issues. A common failure point was the camshaft position sensor (CPS). The failure of this sensor would cause a no-start condition or a stall while running. The easiest way to diagnose a failed CPS is through movement of the tachometer when cranking. If the tachometer does not move, the CPS is most likely bad. The fuel filter/water separator also tends to be a minor failure point across the trucks. The aluminum filter housing can crack, causing fuel leaks. The heating element contained in the filter housing also can short out, blowing a fuse and causing a no start condition. The turbocharger up-pipes are a large failure point, with the pipes leaking from many different points but mainly from the joints. Leaking of the up-pipes causes the engine to lose boost and cause exhaust gas temperatures to increase. The EBPV exhaust back-pressure valve (EBPV) was also prone to failure; it could close when cold and get stuck on causing a jet engine like noise coming from the exhaust.

Most of the issues that came out of these motors were due to poor electrical connections. The UVCH (under valve cover harness) was prone to losing contact with either glow plugs or injectors which caused rough starts or a misfire depending on the year. 1994–1997 engines have two connectors going into each bank, whereas 1999–2003 engines had one connector going into each bank; troubleshooting the harness was easier for the 1994–1997 engines.

The 7.3 L DI Power Stroke was in production until the first quarter of model year 2003, when it was replaced by the 6.0 L. Nearly 2 million 7.3 L DI Power Stroke engines were produced in International's Indianapolis plant.

The 7.3 L DI Power Stroke engine is commonly referred to as one of the best engines that International produced.

== 6.0 Power Stroke ==
The 7.3 L (444 cu in) Power Stroke was replaced by the 6.0 L (365 cu in) beginning in the second quarter of the 2003 model year. The 6.0L Power Stroke, was used in Ford Super Duty trucks until the 2007 model year but lasted until 2009 in the Ford Econoline vans (model year 2010) and in the Ford Excursion SUVs until after the 2005 models when Ford discontinued Excursion production. The engine has a 3.74 in × 4.13 in (95 mm × 105 mm) bore and stroke creating a displacement of 5,954 cc (6.0 L; 363.3 cu in). It utilizes a variable-geometry turbocharger and intercooler, producing 325 hp (242 kW) and 570 lb⋅ft (773 N⋅m) torque with an 18.0:1 compression ratio, with fuel cutoff at 4,200 rpm. Many 6.0 L Power Stroke engines experienced problems.

=== Key specifications ===
- Fuel injection system: Split-shot HEUI (hydraulically actuated electronically controlled unit injectors)
- Valve train: OHV 4-valves per cylinder, 32 valves total (16 intake valves, 16 exhaust valves)
- Turbo configuration: Single; variable vane geometry (VGT)

=== Common issues ===
==== Oil cooler and EGR cooler ====
The sources of the main issues with the 6.0L were the in-block oil cooler, and the EGR cooler materials. The oil cooler is located in the valley of the engine block, underneath the cartridge oil filter set up. The sealed outer portion of the oil cooler is submerged in engine oil, with coolant flowing through the center passages. Over time, the coolant side of oil cooler would plug up with sediment. This would reduce the flow of coolant through the oil cooler and cause higher oil temperatures. This sediment would also reduce the flow of coolant through the EGR cooler resulting in premature failure due to thermal expansion fatiguing the heat exchanging core. The early EGR coolers (2003-2004.5) were also susceptible to premature failure.

==== High-pressure oil system ====
With the use of split-shot HEUI fuel injectors, high-pressure oil is required to pressurize the fuel injectors. The main high-pressure oil (HPO) system components are the high-pressure oil pump (HPOP), HPO manifolds, stand pipes, and branch tube. The HPOP is located in the engine valley at the rear of the engine block. Early build years (2003.5–04.5) are well known for premature HPOP failure. This is due to the poor quality materials used in manufacturing. The HPOP is pressurized by a rotating gear, meshed with a rear camshaft gear. The early model HPOP gears were known to be weak, and develop stress cracks in the teeth resulting in gear failure, thus causing a no start issue for the engine. Early models also had the ICP sensor located on the HPOP cover. The high amount of heat in this location, combined with the exposure to debris in the oil was known to cause ICP sensor failure also resulting in a no-start condition. This issue was addressed by Ford with the late-2004 engine update, bringing a new HPOP design, along with relocation of the ICP sensor to the passenger-side valve cover. The newly designed pump is not known for frequent failure, however a new issue arose with the update. In the late model engines, Ford also redesigned the HPO stand pipes and dummy plugs in the HPO manifold, using poor-quality O-rings. These O-rings were prone to failure causing a HPO leak, and eventually a no-start condition. Ford addressed this concern with updated Viton O-ring washers fixing the issue. With the new HPO system design also came a snap-to-connect (STC) fitting. Some models had the issue of the STC fitting's prongs breaking, causing the fitting to lose its sealing property and again, a no-start condition for the engine. Another frequent (but not always catastrophic) issue with the HPO system is the injection pressure regulator (IPR) screen. The IPR screen is located in the engine valley with the oil cooler. The material used was susceptible to failure and neglecting to replace the screen during an oil cooler replacement could lead to the debris being sent through the HPOP causing complete failure. If the HPOP does not fail, another common failure point is the IPR that, if contaminated by debris, will not be able to seal completely and will then "bleed off" oil pressure causing a no-start condition.

==== Head gaskets ====
Ford/International used four Torque to Yield (TTY) cylinder head bolts per cylinder for the 6.0 and 6.4. TTY bolts offer some of the most precise clamping force available but can be problematic. In certain situations—such as the failure of the oil cooler or EGR cooler, or high boost/load levels brought on by performance upgrades—TTY bolts can be stretched beyond their torque mark by increased cylinder pressures (commonly from coolant being introduced into the cylinder). This has never been addressed by Ford because other malfunctions or abuse must occur to stretch the bolts. Some in the aftermarket will replace the factory bolts with head studs in an attempt to protect the head gaskets from future failure. If this is done without addressing the underlying issue, the head gaskets may fail again bringing along a cracked or warped cylinder head. In contrast, the 7.3 and 6.7 have six head bolts per cylinder while the 6.0, 6.4/VT365, and IDI 7.3 only have four.

==== Electrical and fuel ====
Numerous PCM recalibrations, attempts to "detune" the engine, fuel injector stiction (caused by lack of maintenance and proper oil changes), along with several other drivability and quality control problems, have plagued the 6.0. The FICM (fuel injection control module) has been a problem, where low voltage in the vehicle's electrical system due to failing batteries or a low-output alternator can cause damage to the FICM. In addition, the placement of the FICM on top of the engine subjects it to varying and extreme temperatures and vibrations causing solder joints and components to fail in early build models; mostly in the power supply itself. The FICM multiplies the voltage in the fuel injector circuit from 12 to 48–50 volts to fire the injectors. Low voltage can eventually cause damage to the fuel injectors.

=== Lawsuits and litigation ===
Many owners who purchased their trucks equipped with the 6.0L Power Stroke engine new have received class-action lawsuit payments. Some owners have opted out of the class action lawsuit and went straight to a fraud case: one example is Charles Margeson of California, who was awarded $214,537.34 plus legal fees ($72,564.04 was for repayment of his 2006 F-350). Margeson, along with 5 other owners who opted out of the class action lawsuits, have been awarded over US$10 million.

== 6.4 Power Stroke ==
The 6.4L Power Stroke was introduced for the 2008 Ford Super Duty (F-250 through F-550), and was the first engine introduced to the light truck market that utilized dual turbochargers directly from the factory. Additionally, this was the first Power Stroke to use a diesel particulate filter (DPF) to reduce particulate matter emissions from the exhaust. The new DPF and active regeneration system greatly hindered fuel economy and the engine was ultimately retired after 2010 and replaced by the 6.7L Power Stroke. While warranty claims began to show a level of unreliability similar to the previous 6.0L Power Stroke, the 6.4L Power Stroke has proved to be capable of handling elevated boost levels needed to generate high horsepower and torque.

The engine has a 3.87 in × 4.13 in (98.3 mm × 104.9 mm) bore and stroke, resulting in a total calculated displacement of 6,369 cc (6.4 L; 388.7 cu in). Despite having to meet emission regulations, the engine was able to increase horsepower ratings to 350 hp (261 kW) and torque to 650 lb⋅ft (881 N⋅m) at the flywheel. Horsepower and torque are achieved at 3,000 rpm and 2,000 rpm respectively. It also features a compound VGT turbo system. Air enters the low-pressure turbo (the larger of the two) and is fed into the high-pressure turbo (the smaller of the two), then is directed into the engine or intercooler. This system is designed to result in reduced turbo lag when accelerating from a stop. The series-turbo system is set up to provide a better throttle response while in motion to give a power flow more like a naturally aspirated engine. The 6.4 L also has a DPF and dual EGR coolers which are capable of reducing exhaust gas temps by up to 1,000 degrees before they reach the EGR valve and mix with the intake charge. The DPF traps soot and particulates from the exhaust and virtually eliminates the black smoke that most diesel engines expel upon acceleration. The engine computer is programmed to periodically inject extra fuel in the exhaust stroke of the engine (which is called a DPF Regen or regeneration) to burn off soot that accumulates in the DPF. This engine is designed to only run on ultra low sulfur diesel (ULSD) fuel which has no more than 15 ppm sulfur content; using regular diesel fuel results in emission equipment malfunctions and violates manufacturer warranties.

The 6.4L has had one recall (safety product recall 07S49 was released on March 23, 2007) that addresses the potential for flames to come from the tailpipe of the truck. This problem arises from the DPF which is part of the diesel after-treatment system. A PCM recalibration was released to eliminate the possibility of excessive exhaust temperatures combined with certain rare conditions resulting from what is becoming known as a "thermal event".

=== Key specifications ===
- Fuel injection system: High pressure common rail
- Valve train: OHV 4-valve
- Compound VGT turbo
- DPF
- Advanced multi-shot piezoelectric fuel injection control

=== Common issues ===
- Piston ring failures in #7 and #8 cylinders due to regeneration process. During regeneration, fuel is injected during the exhaust stroke in order to increase the exhaust temperature for DPF cleaning. This exposes the piston rings to excessive heat which eventually causes the piston rings to lose tension, causing low to no compression (compression skip) and excessive blow-by.
- Rocker arm tips impacting (especially on lower geared trucks) due to higher pressure on valve-train (that was not upgraded from the 6.0 liter engine design) after 100,000 to 150,000 mi (160,000 to 240,000 km).
- Turbocharger bearing seal failures (which in turn allows engine lubricating oil to leak past the bearing seal) due to regeneration process pushing high exhaust temperatures through the turbocharger. This condition will precipitate premature clogging of the DPF, which then causes the engine to stay in regeneration mode. If this condition is not corrected quickly, the leaking seal will eventually allow all the engine oil to be pumped out of the engine through the exhaust, causing complete engine failure due to lack of lubrication.
- Higher incidents of cavitation erosion of the front cover due to the larger water pump impeller speed, causing coolant to leak into engine oil.
- EGR cooler failures allowing engine coolant to flow back into #8 cylinder while engine is shut off, which causes the cylinder to hydro-lock and possibly bend the piston connecting rod as well as other damage to engine when it is subsequently started.
- Cylinder head valve guides do not have bronze sleeves, which allows for excessive wear and oil leakage around the valves.
- Connecting rods do not have bronze bushings where the piston wrist pin goes thru the connecting rod. This also allows for excessive wear and noise on higher-mileage vehicles.
- If aftermarket tuning is installed that introduces too much advanced fuel injection timing, cracking of the cylinder heads can result due to excessive combustion temperatures.
- Very high cost of service and repair parts compared to other versions of the Power Stroke.
- Siemens K16 High Pressure Fuel Pump had a problem of self destruction in the 6.4L Power Stroke. When the pump destroyed itself, shrapnel would almost always be sent to all eight injectors, basically rendering them just as useless as the destroyed pump. On occasion, an injector may become stuck open and burn a piston crown, resulting in more repair work.
- Cracking pistons were a problem and usually started on the thin edge of the fuel bowl on the pistons. It occurred more frequently in high-mileage engines, and if left untreated for too long, more engine damage could occur.

== 6.7 Power Stroke ==
The 6.7L Power Stroke debuted in the 2011 Ford Super Duty (F-250 through F-550) trucks, replacing the 6.4L Power Stroke. The first Power Stroke engine to be developed and manufactured by Ford, it was designed in conjunction with AVL of Austria. During its development, Ford engineers codenamed this engine "Scorpion" because of the exhaust manifold and turbocharger being mounted in the engine's "valley" (called hot vee configuration). It features a compacted graphite iron (CGI) block for greater strength and reduced weight, reverse flow aluminum cylinder heads (the exhaust ports are located in the lifter valley) with dual water jackets, six head bolts per cylinder, and 29,000 psi (1,999 bar) high-pressure common rail Bosch fuel system. The system delivers up to five injection events per cylinder per cycle using eight-hole piezo injectors spraying fuel into the piston bowl. This engine also supports B20 biodiesel, allowing fueling options of up to 20 percent biodiesel and 80 percent petroleum diesel. Garrett's single-sequential turbocharger features an industry-first double-sided compressor wheel mounted on a single shaft. The engine block is cast by Tupy, which also does the initial machining. The connecting rods are made by Mahle.

Emissions controls include exhaust gas recirculation, Denoxtronic-based selective catalytic reduction (SCR) from Bosch, and a DPF. Output was originally 390 hp (291 kW) and 735 lb⋅ft (997 N⋅m). but shortly after production started, Ford announced that it made an update to the engine. The new engine control software makes the engine capable of 400 hp (298 kW) at 2,800 rpm and 800 lb⋅ft (1,085 N⋅m) at 1,600 rpm while achieving better fuel economy and without any physical changes to the engine. The 2015 engines are rated at 440 hp (328 kW) and 860 lb⋅ft (1,166 N⋅m). Ford claimed the bump in horsepower is from a new turbocharger, new injector nozzles, and exhaust improvements. For 2017, the torque had risen to 925 lb⋅ft (1,254 N⋅m) at 1800 rpm, while horsepower remained the same. To compete with the Duramax and Cummins engines from GM and Ram, Ford increased output for the 2018 model year to 450 hp (336 kW) 935 lb⋅ft (1,268 N⋅m). Previously, the Duramax motor had a 5 hp (4 kW) gain over the Power Stroke in 2017, and the Cummins engine for 2018 would have had a 10 lb⋅ft (14 N⋅m) torque gain over the Power Stroke if the Power Stroke's output hadn't been increased for 2018. As of 2020, the Power Stroke's output was increased to 475 hp at 2600 rpm and 1050 lb-ft at 1600 rpm, becoming the best-in-class diesel in horsepower. A high-output variant was introduced for the 2023 model year, producing 500 hp (373 kW) and 1,200 lb⋅ft (1,627 N⋅m) of torque.

=== Common issues ===
- Turbocharger Failures. Turbocharger failures were common on 2011 and 2012 model year 6.7L Power Stroke-equipped pickups because of weak ceramic ball bearings in the Honeywell DualBoost turbo. The issue was resolved by using steel ball bearings. Turbo failures are characterized by loud screeching sounds and smoke from the tailpipe.
- Defective Radiators. Early 2011 model year pickups with the 6.7L Power Stroke often experienced radiator leaks. Defects in radiators manufactured before September 2010 were the likely cause. Later model years had fewer reported issues, but leaks can still occur over time.
- NOx Sensor Failures. The 2011 model year engines had frequent failures of NOx sensors, resulting in reduced engine power. Ford addressed the issue through the Custom Satisfaction Program 12B33, which replaced faulty sensors and upgraded the emission control strategy. The program expired in April 2013.
- EGT Sensor on "Ambulance Package" Chassis Cab Trucks. Certain 2011 and 2012 F-350 through F-550 trucks with the "Ambulance Package" had faulty EGT sensors. Failures could cause vehicle shutdown while driving or difficulty restarting. Ford issued a recall (recall 13S10) to replace the sensors, primarily in emergency vehicles. Similar incidents occurred in pickup models but were less widespread.
- Dropping Glow Plugs and Catastrophic Engine Failure. Some early production 6.7L Power Stroke engines experienced glow plug tip breaking off into the engine, leading to catastrophic engine failure. This issue was limited and not a significant concern in later production engines, mainly occurring in specific chassis cab models. Ford would have taken action if widespread issues were detected.
- CP4 Failure. Much less common (but not uncommon) was the failure of the CP4 pump which would lead to catastrophic engine failure. Due to the use of low lubricity fuels, susceptibility to internal wear, and potential of air bubbles formation in the housing, accelerated wear could occur, causing metal shavings to enter the fuel system and damaging components such as the fuel rails, high-pressure lines, injectors, overflow valve, and return lines.

=== Key specifications ===
- Diesel particulate filter
- Valve train: OHV 4-valve
- Turbo configuration: GT32 SST single sequential turbocharger; single 64 mm (2.5 in) turbine and dual-sided compressor
- Fuel injection system: High-pressure common rail, Bosch CP4 injection pump, piezoelectric injectors

2015–2016

Turbo configuration:	"GT37" – single 72.5 mm (2.85 in) turbine and 88 mm (3.5 in) compressor
Fuel system:	High-pressure common-rail, Bosch CP4.2 injection pump, piezoelectric injectors
Engine:	Power Stroke 90° V8
Displacement:	6.7 L (406 cu in)
Bore and stroke:	3.9 in × 4 1/4 in (99.1 mm × 108.0 mm)
Block:	Compacted graphite iron
Heads:	Aluminum (reverse flow)
Pistons:	Hypereutectic piston
Valvetrain:	OHV, 4 valves per cylinder (32 valves in total)
Horsepower:	450 hp (336 kW) at 2,800 rpm
Torque:	935 lb⋅ft (1,268 N⋅m) at 1,600 rpm
Emissions equipment:	EGR, DPF, SCR
Engine dry weight:	970 lb (440 kg)

== 3.2 Power Stroke ==
The 3.2L Power Stroke is an inline-five engine that debuted in the U.S.-spec Transit for model year 2015. The engine is a modified version of the Ford Duratorq 3.2L diesel engine that has been adapted to meet emissions in the United States. To aid in economy, emissions, and reduce NVH, it has a high-pressure common-rail fuel injection system and piezo injectors that can spray up to five different injections per compression event. It has a water-cooled EGR system to reduce the temperature of the exhaust gas before being recirculated through the intake. A unique feature to the emissions system is that the diesel oxidation catalyst (DOC) and the DPF have been combined into one singular unit as opposed to the traditional two separate units. Exhaust treatment continues with SCR which is done by the injection of diesel exhaust fluid in the exhaust to reduce NOx. The engine features a variable-geometry turbo which allows for intake airflow tuning on the fly to increase power and fuel economy. The engine also features a variable-flow oil pump to avoid wasting mechanical energy pumping excessive amounts of oil. It has cast aluminum, low-friction pistons with oil squirters to keep them cool during heavy-load conditions, a die-cast aluminum cam carrier to stiffen up the valvetrain and reduce NVH, and to increase low-end durability, the crankshaft is cast iron and the connecting rods are forged. The block itself is an extra rigid, gray cast iron with a closed deck. The power figures for the 3.2L Power Stroke are 185 hp (138 kW) at 3,000 rpm and 350 lb⋅ft (475 N⋅m) at 1,500–2,750 rpm. The Euro Duratorq 3.2 makes 197 hp (147 kW) and 350 lb⋅ft (475 N⋅m) of torque.

=== Key specifications ===
- Fuel injection system: High-pressure common-rail
- Valvetrain: DOHC 4-valve
- Turbo configuration: Single variable-geometry turbo
- Combined diesel particulate filter and diesel oxidation catalyst
- Urea-injected selective catalytic reduction

== 3.0 Power Stroke ==
The 3.0 L Power Stroke turbo-diesel V6, codenamed "Lion," was introduced in the 2018 Ford F-150 to compete with the Ram 1500 EcoDiesel V6. The engine has a bore and stroke of 84 mm × 90 mm (3.31 in × 3.54 in) with a compression ratio of 16.0:1, and generates 250 hp (186 kW) at 3,250 rpm and 440 lb⋅ft (597 N⋅m) of torque at 1,750 rpm, paired with a Ford–GM 10-speed automatic transmission. It provided a towing capacity of up to 11,440 lb (5,189 kg) when properly equipped. EPA-estimated fuel economy ratings ranged from 25–30 mpg_{‑US} (9.4–7.8 L/100 km; 30–36 mpg_{‑imp}) highway, 20–22 mpg_{‑US} (12–11 L/100 km; 24–26 mpg_{‑imp}) city, and 22–25 mpg_{‑US} (10.7–9.4 L/100 km; 26–30 mpg_{‑imp}) combined, depending on drivetrain and model year. It continued to be offered until the 2021 model year in North America. The 3.0 L Power Stroke was assembled in Dagenham, England.

== 2.8 Power Stroke ==
In South American models, diesel versions of the 2001–2012 Ford Ranger used a 2.8L Power Stroke engine developed by Navistar International from an inline-four Land Rover Defender diesel 2.5L engine, with 130 hp (97 kW) (waste gate) or 133 hp (99 kW) (VNT). A 3.0L version with common-rail fuel injection, four-valve-per-cylinder heads, and 160 hp (119 kW) (wastegate turbo), is the electronic version of the Power Stroke; it has only the block and connecting rods in common with 2.8L version.

== 4.5 Power Stroke ==
The 4.5L Power Stroke is a V6 with the same turbo design as the 6.4L. The geometry of these engines is the same as the 6.0L minus two cylinders. The 4.5L and 6.0L share some of the same parts. The 4.5L came stock with 200 hp (149 kW) and 440 lb⋅ft (597 N⋅m) of torque.

== Applications ==
Power Stroke engines have been used in the following applications.

Ford Econoline E-350 and E-450 (full-size vans)

- 1995–2003 7.3 L
- 2004–2010 6.0 L

Ford Excursion (full-size sport utility vehicles)

- 2000–2003 7.3 L
- 2003.5–2005 6.0 L

Ford F-Series (full-size pickup trucks)

- Mid-1994 – Mid-2003 7.3 L
- Mid-2003 – 2007 6.0 L
- 2008–2010 6.4 L
- 2011–present 6.7 L
- 2018–2021 3.0 L (F-150 only)

Ford F-Series (F-650 and F-750 medium duty trucks)

- 2000–2003 7.3 L
- 2004–2008 6.0 L
- 2016–present 6.7 L

LCF (low cab forward)

- 2005–2010 4.5 L

Ford Transit

- 2015–2019 3.2 L

== See also ==
- Ford engines
- Ford Modular engine
