= International Harvester IDI =

IDI
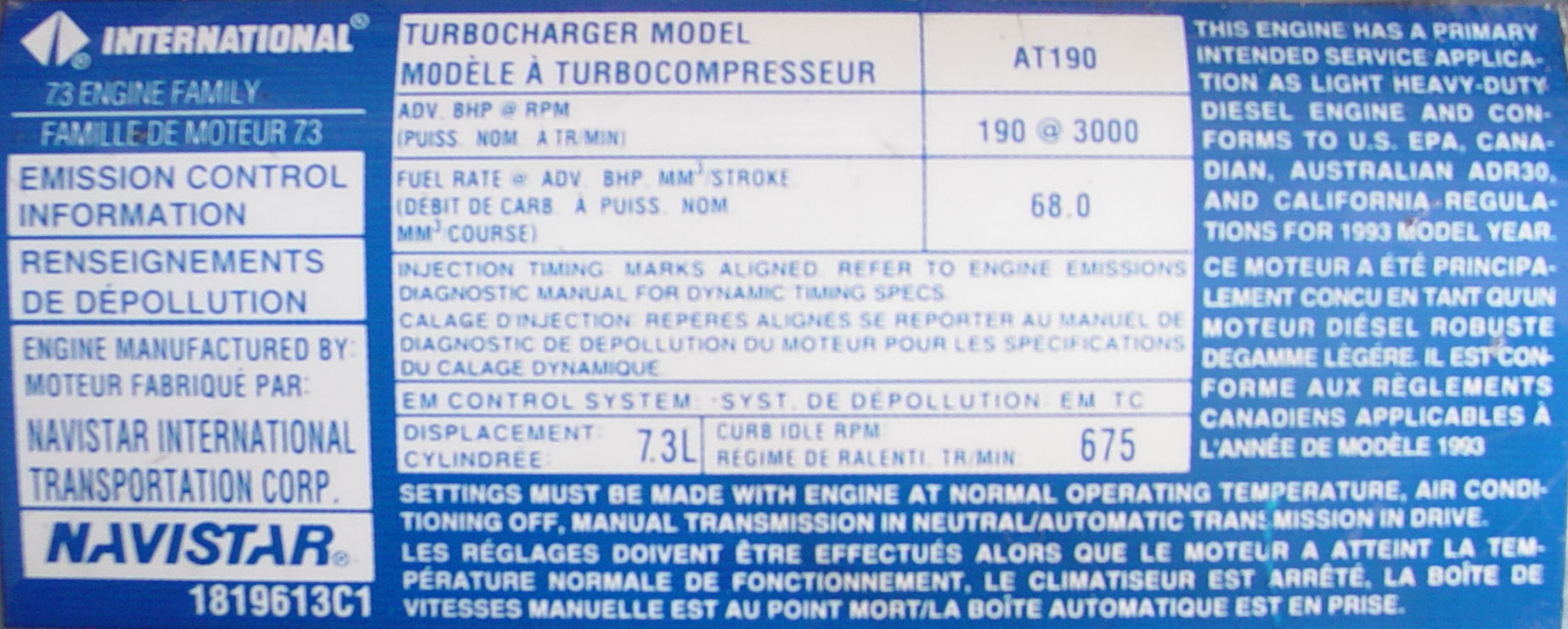
- Valve cover sticker from International-Navistar AT190 7.3 liter turbo-diesel engine as installed in 1994 Ford F-350

Overview
- Manufacturer: International Harvester (1982–1985); Navistar International (1986–1994)
- Production: 1982–1987 (6.9 L); 1986–1994 (7.3 L)

Layout
- Configuration: 90° V8
- Displacement: 420 cu in (6.9 L); 444 cu in (7.3 L)
- Cylinder bore: 4 in (101.6 mm) (6.9 L); 4.11 in (104.4 mm) (7.3 L)
- Piston stroke: 4.18 in (106.2 mm)
- Cylinder block material: Iron
- Cylinder head material: Iron
- Valvetrain: OHV 2 valves x cyl.
- Compression ratio: 20.7:1 (1983 6.9 L); 21.5:1 (1984 & Later 6.9 L)

RPM range
- Idle speed: 650 (6.9 L); 675 (7.3 L)

Combustion
- Turbocharger: Optional Single Wastegated, AR.82 Garrett T3 (1993–1994 Only)
- Fuel system: Indirect injection
- Management: Mechanical
- Fuel type: Diesel
- Oil system: 10 US qt (9.5 L; 8.3 imp qt)
- Cooling system: Water-cooled

Output
- Power output: 161 hp (120 kW) (1983), later 170 hp (127 kW) @ 3,300 RPM (6.9 L); 185 hp (138 kW) @ 3,000 RPM (7.3 L); 190 hp (142 kW) @ 3,000 RPM (7.3 L turbo)
- Torque output: 307 lb⋅ft (416 N⋅m) @ 1,800 (1983) 315 lb⋅ft (427 N⋅m) @ 1,400 RPM (1984 & Later)(6.9 L); 338 lb⋅ft (458 N⋅m) @ 1,800 RPM (7.3 L); 388 lb⋅ft (526 N⋅m) @ 1,400 RPM (7.3 L turbo)

Chronology
- Successor: Navistar T444E; Ford Power Stroke V8

The International Harvester IDI (from Indirect Injection) engine is a four-stroke diesel V8 engine used in International Harvester school buses, trucks, Ford F-Series pickups, and Ford E-Series vans from the 1983 to 1994 model years. The engine was built in two displacements: 420 cubic inches (6.9 L), which was used in Ford trucks from 1983 until 1987, and 444 cubic inches (7.3 L), which was used in Ford trucks from 1988 until 1994 (naturally aspirated) and in 1993 and 1994 (turbocharged).

During 1994 production, the IDI engine was replaced by the Navistar T444E engine, sharing only the displacement with the IDI. The T444E was the first engine marketed under the Ford Power Stroke name.

== History ==
In 1981 Ford signed an agreement with International Harvester to produce diesel engines for their light truck line. This led directly to the production of the 6.9-liter IDI diesel. The engine is developed as a low cost, light weight diesel that fit where a V8 gas engine would, to try to convert their gas engine customers to diesel and to sell to Ford for use in F-Series light duty trucks and E-Series/Econoline vans. Before it could be sold to Ford however, Tenneco Inc. purchased in the "Harvester" division of International Harvester which was moved within their Case heavy equipment line. The remainder of what was International Harvester was renamed Navistar, which concentrated on engine and medium/heavy truck development. Consequently, these are actually International-Navistar IDI engines.

== 6.9 L ==
Initial development for the 6.9 began in 1976, and after receiving approval from upper-level executives in 1977, casting and testing began the following year with the goal of production for spring 1983; however, production started seven months early for an autumn 1982 release. Introduced for the 1983 model year, the 6.9 L diesel was the first to be offered in Ford light-duty pickups, available in the F-250 HD and F-350. Although GM pickups already had offered a diesel engine in the C10 starting in 1978 (5.7 L Oldsmobile), and across the range in 1982 (6.2 L Detroit), those engines were intended for efficiency over power. The 6.9 L loosely replaced the 400 cu in (6.6 L) gas V8 that was offered between 1977 and 1982 and was billed as a fuel efficient alternative to the 351 cu in (5.8 L) V8 Windsor gasoline engine. Falling between the base 300 cu in (4.9 L) Inline-6 and top-of-the line 460 cu in (7.5 L) gas V8, the 6.9 L engine was naturally aspirated and put out 170 hp (127 kW) at 3,300 RPM and 315 lb⋅ft (427 N⋅m) at 1,400 RPM.

== 7.3 L ==
For 1987, a larger 7.3 L version of the IDI was introduced. This engine features numerous improvements over the 6.9, with most of the changes located in the heads; the block received an increased bore and select-fit pistons, while the heads received an enlarged prechamber, enlarged valve stem shields, harder valves, and other minor upgrades. The front cover was revised to reduce seepage.

The first 7.3 L engines were available as an option for International S-series trucks & school buses. For 1988, it became the sole available IDI engine and was now offered in Ford trucks.

For 1993, Ford made available a turbocharged variant of the 7.3 L featuring an internally wastegated AR.82 Garrett T3 series turbo. The system was tuned to minimize performance loss at high elevation, rather than to improve peak performance. A primary limiting factor to the performance potential of the engine is a highly restrictive stock down-pipe. It is commonly believed, but not officially verified, that this is deliberate and due to Ford's impending release of the T444E (Powerstroke) engine. Factory turbo vehicles received numerous additional improvements. Pistons had an enlarged primary compression ring, added intermediate ring, an enlarged ring land and wrist pin, as well as an anodized piston face. Other improvements included tweaks to the injection pump, and an upgraded oil-coolant heat exchanger.

== Fuel system ==
These engines use an injection pump that is entirely mechanical, as was the standard for diesels of the day. The fuel system also utilizes indirect injection which made it quieter than mechanically direct injected engines. Both displacements use the Stanadyne DB-2 injection pump fed by a cam-driven lift pump.
