= List of school bus manufacturers =

In most instances, school bus manufacturers are second stage manufacturers; however, a few school buses (typically those of Type D configuration) utilize a body and chassis produced by a single manufacturer.

Although school buses are typically body-on-frame, Type D school buses are typically of monocoque/semi-monocoque design.

== School bus configurations ==
The North American school bus industry produces buses in four different body configurations, listed below:

School bus configurations (images of contemporary school bus models)
Configuration	Type A	Type B	Type C	Type D
Passenger capacity (typical)	≥10 typically 16-36	≥10 typically 30-36	≥10 typically 36-78	≥10 typically 36-90
GVWR	Type A-I: ≤ 14,500 pounds (6,600 kg); Type A-II:14,500 pounds (6,600 kg) and up	Type B-I: ≤ 10,000 pounds (4,500 kg); Type B-II: between 10,000–21,499 pounds (4,536–9,752 kg)	over 21,500 pounds (9,800 kg); (typically between 23,000–29,500 pounds (10,400–13,400 kg))	over 20,000 pounds (9,100 kg); (typically between 25,000–36,000 pounds (11,000–16,000 kg))
Description	A small school bus with the body placed on a cutaway van chassis with a left-side driver's door; Single or dual rear wheels on drive axles.	A small school bus with the body mounted to a stripped chassis (except for the IC Bus BE Series, which is built on a cowled chassis); The entrance door is mounted behind the front wheels; In most versions (except the IC BE), the engine compartment is located partially inside the passenger compartment next to the driver and the hood is significantly shorter than that of conventional buses (similar to step vans)	A school bus with the body mounted to a cowled medium-duty truck chassis; In the past, the chassis was often supplied from another manufacturer, but more recently, the chassis manufacturer and the bus body manufacturer are the same company.; Although typically of cowled-chassis chassis design, a few Type C buses are of cutaway-cab design.; The entrance door is mounted behind the front wheels.; The engine is mounted forward of the windshield	A monocoque or semi-monocoque school bus (not chassis-based).; The entrance door is mounted in front of the front wheels.; Single rear axle or (historically) tandem rear axles; The engine is mounted next to the driver inside the bus (front-engine/"FE"), in the rear of the bus behind the rearmost seats (rear-engine/"RE"), or historically, in between the axles underneath the floor ("amidship" or "mid-engine"); The last mid-engine Type D school buses were manufactured when Crown Coach ceased operations in 1991.; Although they are typically of monocoque design, a few Type D school buses used a separate chassis.

== Lists of manufacturers ==
Current manufacturers
Company name	Current bus production	Founded	Location	Notes
Full-line manufacturers
Blue Bird Corporation	Type A; Type C; Type D	1932	Fort Valley, Georgia; Drummondville, Quebec; Plattsburgh, New York	Blue Bird is a publicly held company with Cerberus Capital Management as majority stakeholder.; Blue Bird produces the Vision and All American full-size buses; the Micro Bird is assembled by Girardin.; school buses fueled by diesel, gasoline, and propane, along with fully electric school buses.
IC Bus	Type C	2002	Lisle, Illinois (corporate); Tulsa, Oklahoma (assembly)	IC has been a wholly owned subsidiary of International Motors, part of Traton since 2021.; IC was founded through the rebranding of AmTran, the successor of Ward Body Works.; school buses produced with diesel, gasoline, or electric powertrains
LION	Type C; Type D	2011	Saint-Jérôme, Quebec, Canada	Founded as Autobus Lion/Lion Bus, the company adopted its current name of LION in 2025.; First school bus mass-produced with an electric powertrain.; Following corporate bankruptcy, vehicles are currently marketed only in Quebec.; LION produces electric Type C (conventional) buses on Spartan Motors chassis.; LION bus bodies are produced with composite materials in place of steel to minimize corrosion.
RIDE (Real Innovation Delivered with Excellence)	Type A; Type C; Type D	2023	Pasadena, California (corporate); Lancaster, California (manufacturing / assembly)	RIDE is the US spinoff of Chinese manufacturer BYD.; RIDE produces battery-electric school buses in all three design configurations.
Thomas Built Buses, Inc.	Type A; Type B (formerly); Type C; Type D	1916 (as Perley A. Thomas Car Works)	High Point, North Carolina (headquarters/assembly); Archdale, North Carolina (assembly)	Since 1998, Thomas has been a subsidiary of Daimler Trucks North America, LLC (Freightliner).; The oldest surviving bus manufacturer in the United States, Thomas was founded in 1916 as the Perley A. Thomas Car Works.
Type A-only manufacturers
Collins Bus Corporation	Type A	1967	Hutchinson, Kansas	Since 2024, Collins Bus Corporation has been a wholly owned subsidiary of Forest River.; Manufacturer of the "Bantam" and "NexBus" series of Type A buses.; Parent company of Corbeil and Mid Bus in the late 2000s, with the latter two companies becoming regional brands for Collins until 2016.; The Collins Magellan line was sold as a successor for Starcraft Bus vehicles.
Endera Motors	Type A	2019	Ottawa, Ohio	Endera Motors purchased Titan Bus, LLC in April 2021.
Girardin Minibus	Type A	1965	Drummondville, Quebec, Canada Plattsburgh, New York	In 1965, Girardin converted a van into a school bus for the first time.; From 2009 to 2026, the company formed half of the Micro Bird, Inc. joint venture; it still assembles the vehicles in Quebec and New York.; Along with small-bus production, Girardin is also the Canadian distributor of Blue Bird full-size buses.
Trans Tech	Type A	2007	Goshen, Indiana	Since 2026, Trans Tech is a subsidiary of Forest River (becoming a sister company of Collins).; Replaced ST and Star-series vehicles with NexBus-series designs in 2026.; Trans Tech was the first school bus manufacturer to produce a fully electric school bus (eTrans, based on the Smith Electric Newton).
Van-Con, Inc.	Type A Type B	1973	Middlesex, New Jersey	Van-Con, Inc. is New Jersey's only school bus manufacturer.; Van-Con, Inc produces 16, 25, 30 passenger and wheelchair accessible school buses.; All vehicles produced on Chevrolet cutaway van chassis.
Type A&D-only manufacturers
GreenPower Motor Company	Type A Type D	2017	Vancouver, British Columbia, Canada (corporate); Porterville, California (assembly); South Charleston, West Virginia (manufacturing)	GreenPower Synapse 72 - introduced in early 2017 - is a zero-emission Type D school bus.; GreenPower exclusively builds all-electric vehicles.

Recently defunct manufacturers (2002–present)
Company name	Founded	Ceased production	Location	Notes
Full-line manufacturers
AmTran (American Transportation Corporation)	1980	2002	Conway, Arkansas; Tulsa, Oklahoma	Produced Type A, C, and D buses.; Marketed school buses under the Ward name from 1980 to 1992 (commercial buses adopted AmTran name in 1980).; Re-branded as International, then IC in 2003 after being purchased outright by Navistar International in 1995.
Les Enterprises Michel Corbeil (Corbeil)	1985	2007	St-Lin-Laurentides, Quebec, Canada	Produced Type A, C, and D buses.; Type C and D full-size buses sold in Canada only.; Assets acquired by Collins Industries in 2007.; Exists today in the United States as Collins subsidiary Corbeil Bus Corporation.
Lion Electric Company (La Compagnie Électrique Lion)	2011	2025	Saint-Jérôme, Quebec, Canada	Produced Type A, C, and D buses.; Along with diesel-fuel buses (Lion 360), the company produces the first full-size electric school bus (eLion).; The company stated in December 2024 that it was entering creditor protection in Canada and Chapter 15 bankruptcy in the US, as it defaulted on its debt; Lion laid off 920 employees during the year, including a temporary layoff of 400 employees at the Illinois plant.
Type A-only manufacturers
Liberty Bus		2005	Lima, Ohio	Produced a small number of Type A school buses in early 2000s.
Mid Bus Corporation	1981	2007	Lima, Ohio (1981–1995); Bluffton, Ohio (1995–2007)	Created by employees of Superior Coach Company to continue production of Type A school buses.; Acquired by Collins Bus Corporation in 1998.; From 2007 to 2013, Mid Bus products are re-badged Collins models.
Starcraft Bus	1997	2020	Goshen, Indiana	Produced Type A buses from the late 2000s to 2020.; Starcraft announced in November 2009 a joint venture with Hino Motors (a division of Toyota) to develop an all-new Type C design. A prototype was unveiled in Fall 2010, but did not enter series production.; In 2016, Starcraft developed a Type B "Quest XL" bus on a Ford stripped chassis to utilize alternative-fuel sources, which was no longer in production.
Titan Bus, LLC	2017	2021	Ottawa, Ohio	Titan Bus was purchased by Endera Motors in April 2021.
U.S. Bus Corporation	1995	2007	Suffern, New York	Producer of Type A buses in the 1990s and the early 2000s.

Historical manufacturers (1980–2002)
Company name	Founded	Ceased production	Location	Notes
Full-line manufacturers
Carpenter Industries, Inc.	1919	2001	Mitchell, Indiana (1919–1995); Richmond, Indiana (1996–2001)	Produced Type A, B, C, and D buses.; Crown by Carpenter was a 1995–96 re-branding of Carpenter, using the rights from the purchase of the Crown Coach name; It was used from the 1996 to 1999 model years.; Carpenter was shut down in May 2001 by parent company Spartan Motors.
Superior Coach Company	1925	1985	Lima, Ohio	Produced Type A, B, C, and D buses.; Superior employees created Mid Bus in 1981.; Full-size bus production ended after 1985 (design later used by New Bus, Inc.).
Ward Body Works	1933	1980	Conway, Arkansas; Beaver Falls, Pennsylvania	Produced Type A, B, C, and D buses.; Filed for Chapter 11 bankruptcy in 1980; re-organized as American Transportation Corporation (AmTran) in 1981.; Successor AmTran continued use of Ward brand name (on school buses) until 1992.
Wayne Corporation	1837	1992	Richmond, Indiana; Windsor, Ontario, Canada	Produced Type A, B, C, and D buses.; Wayne underwent several changes of ownership before ending up as Richmond Transportation Corporation from 1985 to 1992.; Wayne Wheeled Vehicles (the successor to Wayne Corporation) was a subsidiary of Harsco Corporation and ceased operations in 1995.
Wayne Wheeled Vehicles	1992	1995	Marysville, Ohio	Produced Type A, C, and D buses.; Wayne Wheeled Vehicles (the successor to Wayne Corporation) was a subsidiary of Harsco Corporation.; Continued production of Wayne Corporation products.
Type A-only manufacturers
Coach and Equipment Manufacturing		1999	Penn Yan, New York	A manufacturer of van conversions to Type A school buses from the early 1970s to the mid 1990s
Shirley Van	1984?	1996		A manufacturer of van conversions to Type A school buses from the 1980s to 1996.
Type C/D-only manufacturers
Crown Coach Corporation	1904	1991	Los Angeles, California (1904–1984); Chino, California (1984–1991)	Produced Type D buses.; Subsidiary of GE Railcar from 1987 to 1991.; Rights to the Crown name were purchased in May 1991 by Carpenter Body Works.
Gillig Corporation	1890	1993	Hayward, California	Produced Type C and D buses.; Ended school bus production in 1993; still produces mass-transit buses.
New Bus, Inc.	1988	1990	Chickasha, Oklahoma	Produced a small number of Type C and Type D buses in the late 1980s.; Type C buses were continuation of Superior production.
TAM-USA	1991	1991	Maribor, Slovenia (initial body assembly); Van Nuys, California (final assembly)	TAM-USA was an importer of Yugoslavian-built TAM buses.; A small number of school bus bodies (Type D) were manufactured in Yugoslavia and fitted with American drivetrain components in California.; Ceased all production in 1994.

Historical manufacturers (before 1980)
Company name	Founded	Ceased production	Location	Notes
Hackney Brothers Body Company	1928	c. 1966	Wilson, North Carolina	Produced Type C buses on Ford chassis.
Hicks Body Company	1923	1953	Lebanon, Indiana	Produced Type C buses.
Kenworth-Pacific		1957	Renton, Washington	Produced Type D buses.; Kenworth subsequently sold their bus tooling and equipment to Gillig.
Northern Coach	1977?	1979?	Wisconsin	Produced a small number of "Northern-Air" Type C buses in the late 1970s.
Oneida Products Corporation	c. 1935	1960	Canastota, New York; Indianapolis, Indiana	From 1952 to 1960, Oneida was owned by professional car manufacturer Henney Motor Company.; Oneida was purchased in 1960 by Marmon-Herrington.
Perley A. Thomas Car Works	1916	1972	High Point, North Carolina	Produced Type C and D buses; best known for its streetcar production.; Perley A. Thomas Car Works was re-organized into Thomas Built Buses in 1972.
Union City Body Company		1957	Union City, Indiana	Produced Type C buses.; Union City is now a supplier of bodies for UPS.

== See also ==
- List of buses
