= Corbeil Bus Corporation =

Defunct Canadian bus manufacturer

- Industry: Transportation
- Founded: 1985; 41 years ago
- Founder: Michel Corbeil
- Defunct: 2007
- Fate: Acquired by Collins and was withdrawn from production by parent company
- Headquarters: 830 12th Avenue, Saint-Lin-Laurentides, Quebec, Canada
- Area served: Canada (small and full-size buses); United States (small buses only)
- Products: Buses (school buses)
- Parent: Collins Industries
- Website: www.corbeilbus.com (Enterprises Michel Corbeil website, archived); www.corbeilbus.com (Corbeil Bus Corporation website, archive)

Corbeil Bus Corporation is a former Canadian bus manufacturer headquartered in Saint-Lin–Laurentides, Quebec, that specialized primarily in school buses from 1985 to 2007. From 1936 to 1975, J.H. Corbeil was a manufacturer of bus bodies; In 2007, the company was acquired out of bankruptcy by Collins Industries. Serving as the Canadian equivalent of Collins Bus Corporation, manufacturing was shifted from Quebec to Hutchinson, Kansas.

In the early 2000s, Corbeil built over 2,500 vehicles per year in its facility in Canada. Following the discontinuation of the Mid Bus brand name, Collins ended the use of the Corbeil name after 2015 in favor of using its namesake brand on its vehicles across North America.

== History ==
=== 1936–1975: J.H. Corbeil ===
Corbeil traces its roots to 1936, when Joseph Henri Corbeil founded J.H. Corbeil. Located in St-Lin-Laurentides, the company was a manufacturer of bodies for trucks and buses, shifting to bus body production in 1956.

Following the 1960 death of Joseph Corbeil, control of J.H. Corbeil shifted to his sons, including Michel Corbeil. During the late 1960s, the company held nearly two-thirds market share of bus body production in Quebec and eastern Canadian provinces. To accommodate increased demand, J.H. Corbeil introduced a larger manufacturing facility in St-Lin-Laurentides (next door to the first factory).

In 1975, J.H. Corbeil was sold to the Canadian division of Blue Bird, which was converted to manufacture their products under the "Blue Bird Québec" plant name. However, due to the reducing demand, the company closed the plant in the early 1980s, and consolidated its operations at their main plant near Brantford, Ontario.

=== 1985–2007: Les Entreprises Michel Corbeil ===
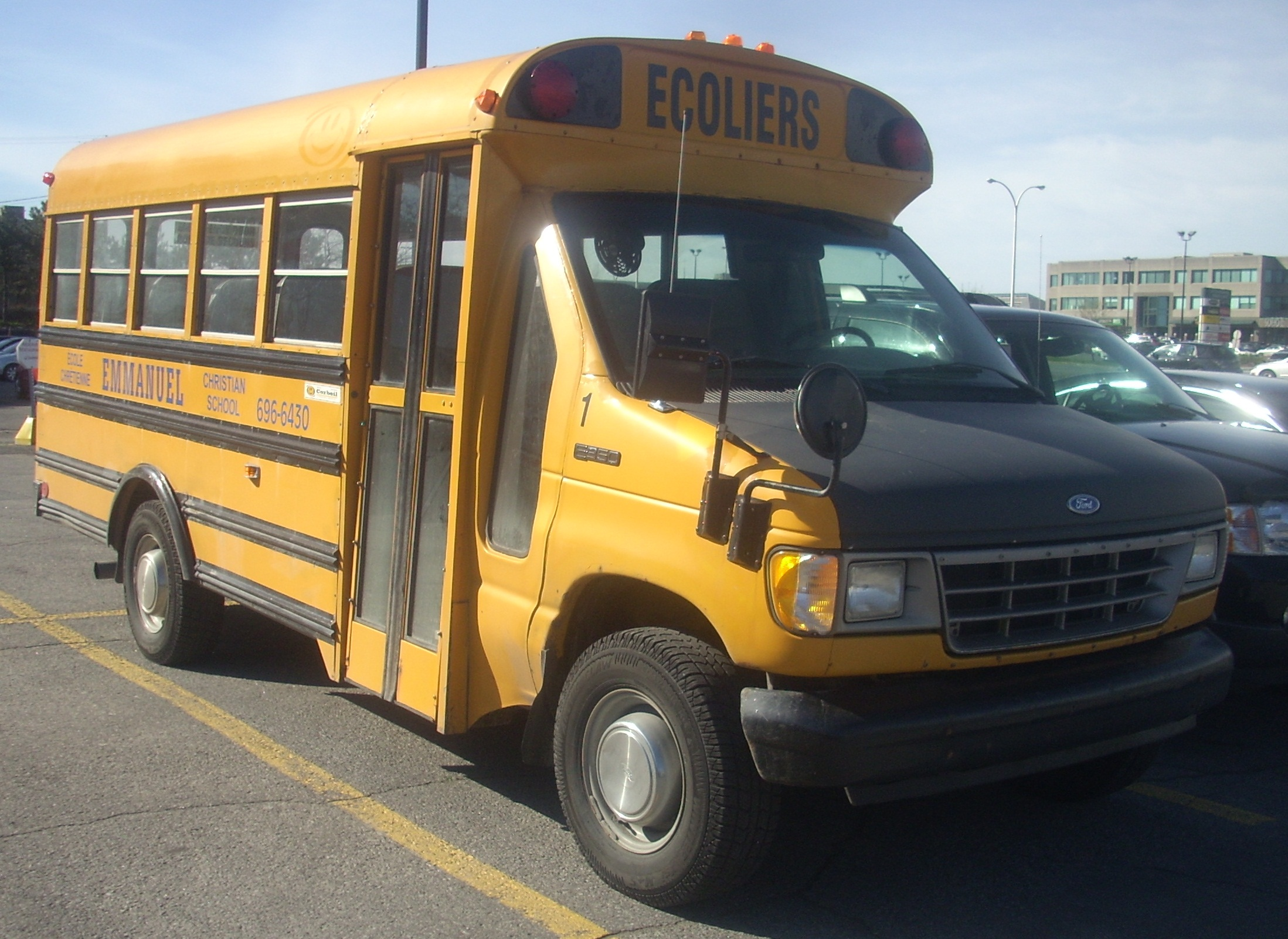
1995-1996 Corbeil Mini-Bus (Ford E-350) in Quebec

In 1985, with several business partners in St-Lin-Laurentides, Michel Corbeil founded Les Entreprises Michel Corbeil, Inc. restarting production in the 7,000 square-foot factory founded by his father in 1936. For the first time, Corbeil produced school bus bodies, specializing in bodies for single rear-wheel cutaway van chassis. By the end of 1985, the company produced 77 bus bodies.

By the end of the 1980s, production of Corbeil buses expanded, with the company replacing its 1930s facility with a 130,000 square-foot factory to accommodate demand. In 1990, the company added bodies for dual rear-wheel van chassis for the first time.

In 1991, the company introduced its first full-size buses, the EMC 1st Premier conventional (EMC=Entreprises Michel Corbeil), using an International 3800 chassis (with Ford B800 as an option). In 1993, the EMC3900 was introduced; sharing its International 3900 chassis with the AmTran Genesis.

For the United States school bus market, American Transportation Corporation (the bus division of International) blocked Corbeil from selling its full-size buses in the country, because they would directly compete with AmTran's own bus products. This forced Corbeil to concentrate on its small bus offerings, not selling the 1st Premier or the EMC3900 outside of Canada.

For 1994, Corbeil entered a joint venture with Indiana-based manufacturer Carpenter, manufacturing single rear-wheel buses marketed through its deal network (similar to a joint venture between Blue Bird and Girardin); the joint venture lasted through 1998.

In 1995, Corbeil changed its company emblem, shifting from a vertical EMC to a large smiley face on the roofline of the bus, with the design becoming one of the most widely recognized manufacturer emblems in the transportation industry. With the addition of the "smiley face", the EMC 1st Premier was renamed the Corbeil Conventional.

During the early 2000s, Les Entreprises Michel Corbeil struggled to compete. In 1999, Carpenter shifted exclusively towards production of full-size buses, effectively ending its joint distribution agreement with Corbeil (before closing its operations forever in 2001). Following poor sales, the Corbeil Rear Engine was withdrawn, alongside the forward-control (formerly EMC3900) bus. The body of Corbeil minibuses and conventionals underwent several revisions in 2002, largely distinguished by the warning light surrounds.

In 2002, Corbeil introduced its Heritage model. Sold only in Canada, the Heritage used the Ford E450 cutaway chassis for deluxe commercial applications; including tour operators, care facilities, and resorts. After the 2004 model year, Corbeil stopped selling the Conventional. In 2004, IC Corporation (the successor to AmTran/Ward) commenced sales of full-size buses in Canada, largely taking the place of the discontinued Corbeil Conventional, along with the discontinued 3000 and 3900.

In September 2007, after 22 years of assembly, Corbeil shut down its operations, closing its facilities in Quebec and Indianapolis, Indiana.

=== 2007–2013: Corbeil Bus Corporation ===
In late 2007, Les Entreprises Michel Corbeil was acquired by Collins Bus Corporation, with Collins purchasing the assets, designs, naming rights and warranties of Corbeil. In a major change, Corbeil transitioned from a stand-alone manufacturer to a regional product line of Collins Bus Corporation, consolidating headquarters from Quebec to the Hutchinson, Kansas facility of Collins. The parent company of Mid Bus, in 2007, Collins consolidated production of all three bus product ranges in its Kansas facility, with the first American-produced Corbeils assembled before 2008. As the company restarted bus production, Corbeil offered the Collins Bantam product line under the Corbeil Quantum nomenclature.

To minimize internal competition, Collins marketed itself, Mid Bus, and Corbeil in different regions of North America. As before, Corbeil production was marketed primarily in Canada (Quebec and Ontario) and New England. In 2012, the Quantum naming scheme was retired as Collins introduced the NexBus bodyshell for all three of its brands (shifting towards a naming scheme naming buses by function).

During the 2010s, Collins has consolidated from three vehicle brands to one. In 2013, Mid Bus (the final remaining entity of the bus manufacturer Superior) was withdrawn. Also in 2013, Collins ended the use of the Corbeil brand in Canada in favor of using the Collins brand across North America.

== Products ==
Corbeil product line (1985–2007)
Model name	Production	Vehicle type	Chassis	Notes
Minibus	1985–2007	Type A (cutaway)	Ford Motor Company: Ford E-Series (to 2007); General Motors: Chevrolet G30/GMC Vandura (to 1996); Chevrolet Express/GMC Savana (1997–2007)	Sold with single or dual rear wheels.; Dual rear wheels were introduced in 1990.
EMC 1st Premier/Conventional	1991–2004	Type C (conventional)	Ford Motor Company: Ford B700/B800/B8000 (to 1998); Freightliner: Freightliner FS-65 (1997–2002); Navistar International: International 3800	Introduced in 1991, the 1st Premier/Conventional was only sold in Canada.; International/AmTran competed the Corbeil Conventional with its Volunteer/CS model and the IC model in the United States.
EMC3900/Forward Control	1993–2000	Type D (transit-style): front engine	Navistar International: International 3900	Introduced in 1993 and was only sold in Canada.; International/AmTran competed the Corbeil Forward Control with its Genesis/FE model in the United States.
EMC3000/Rear Engine	1998–2000?	Type D (transit-style): rear engine	Navistar International: International 3000	Introduced in 1998 and was only sold in Canada.; International/AmTran competed the Corbeil Rear Engine with its RE model in the United States.; Similar in configuration to the AmTran RE, very few examples of the Corbeil Rear Engine were produced.

=== Company timeline ===
Les Entreprises Michel Corbeil, Inc. timeline (1985–2007)
	1980s					1990s										2000s
	'85	'86	'87	'88	'89	'90	'91	'92	'93	'94	'95	'96	'97	'98	'99	'00	'01	'02	'03	'04	'05	'06	'07
Brand name	Corbeil/EMC											Corbeil
Bus type	Corbeil school buses
Type A	Minibus
Type C							1st Premier/Conventional
Type D									EMC3900
Type D															EMC3000
