= International 3000 and 3900 =

Bus chassis

International 3000/3900
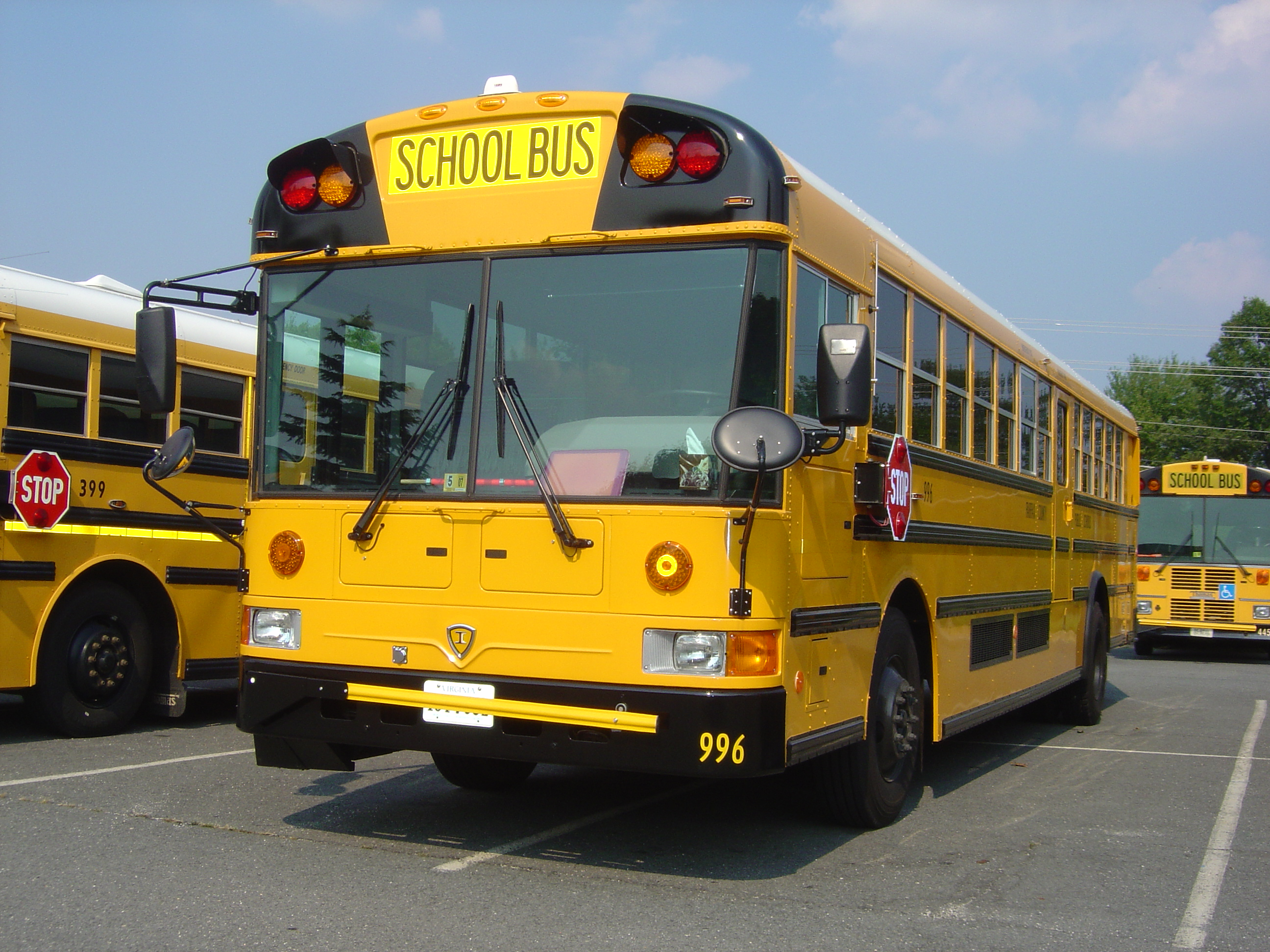
- IC Bus RE-Series (current model)

Overview
- Manufacturer: Navistar International
- Production: 1990 - 2024

Body and chassis
- Class: Type D (transit-style)
- Layout: front-engine/forward-control 4x2 (3900); rear-engine 4x2 (3000)
- Body styles: Stripped chassis: School Bus/MFSAB; Commercial Bus
- Vehicles: see below

Powertrain
- Engine: see below

Chronology
- Predecessor: International Harvester 183/193RE; International Harvester 1853FC

The International 3000 and 3900 are transit-style (Type D) bus chassis manufactured by Navistar International, used for school bus and commercial bus applications. Produced from 1990 to 2024, the 3000 and 3900 have been produced in rear and front engine configurations respectively.

== 3000 ==
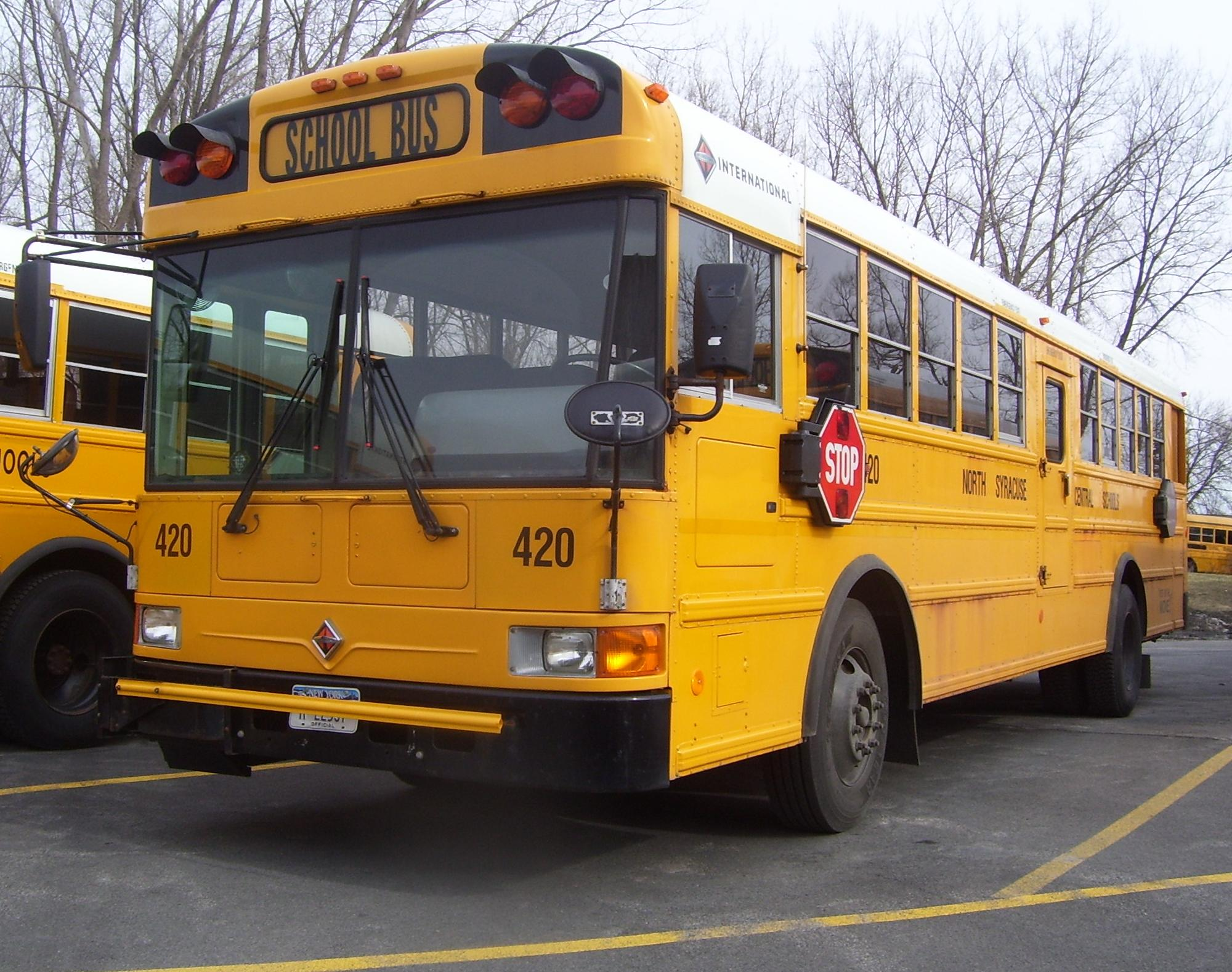
International-branded 2002 AmTran RE

Introduced in 1996 as a chassis for the AmTran RE, the 3000 was the first rear-engine bus chassis produced in nearly 20 years. Aside from a few buses bodied by Corbeil in the late 1990s, this chassis has been used exclusively by AmTran and its Navistar corporate successor IC Bus. In production for 20 years unchanged, it has one of the longest production runs of a bus chassis in North America. Just like the FE, the RE would be redesigned in 2003 after the rebranding of AmTran to IC Bus.

From 1996 to 2016, the 3000 was powered exclusively by International diesel engines. Introduced with the T444E V8 engine, the engine lineup was expanded in 1997 to include the DT engine family and successor V8 engines, including the VT365. For the 2008 model year, IC stopped offering V8 engines for the RE and only offered inline-6 engines, starting with the MaxxForce DT. In 2017, the MaxxForce DT engine was replaced with the Cummins L9 due to the failed EGR strategy of the International diesel engines. Production of the IC RE was officially discontinued as of January 1st, 2024.

== 3900 ==
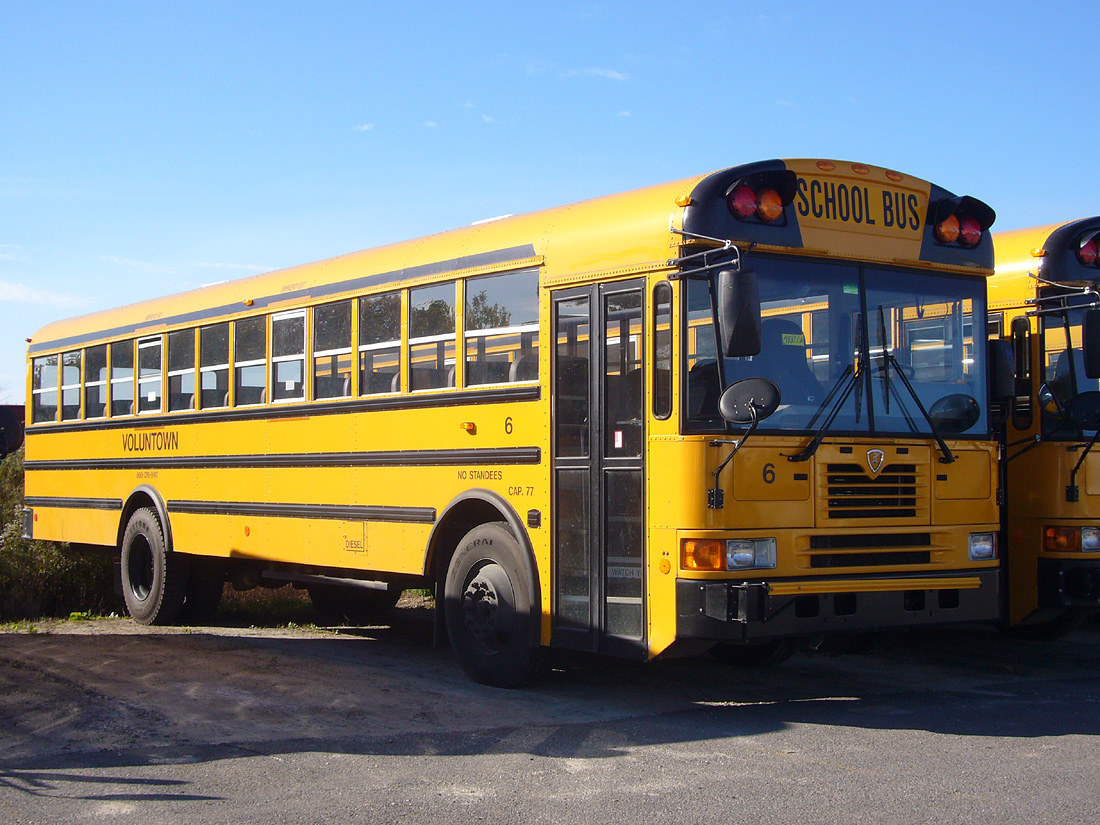
IC FE300 (Discontinued)

Introduced as the replacement for the long-running International Harvester 1853FC forward-control chassis, the 3900 was first produced in 1990. Along with its IHC predecessor, many body manufacturers sourced the 3900 as the replacement for the discontinued General Motors S7 and Asia-Smith Motors forward-control chassis. By the mid-1990s, Navistar subsidiary AmTran became the sole user of the 3900. The FE was redesigned for the 1999 model year. The warning light caps and the back were redesigned after AmTran renamed themselves to IC Bus in 2003. It would later also be updated in 2008. In 2010, production of the 3900 was discontinued.

All 3900 chassis were powered by variations of the DT engine family, those being the DT466 and MaxxForce DT.

== Powertrain ==
While a stripped chassis instead of a cowled chassis, the 3900/3000 maintained mechanical commonality with the 3800 conventional. This included shared powertrain and suspension components, while interior parts included Navistar instrument panels and steering columns. The 3800 itself was based on the International 4700/4900.

As Navistar abandoned its use of MaxxForce engines (due to the use of EGR emissions treatment systems), the company announced that the MaxxForce DT was replaced by the Cummins L9 for 2017 production.

=== V8 engines (1996-2007, 3000 only) ===
- Navistar T444E
- Navistar VT365

=== Inline-6 engines (1990-2024) ===
- Navistar DT466E
- Navistar DT530E (1996-2002, 3000 only)
- Navistar MaxxForce DT
- Navistar MaxxForce 9 (IC RC only)
- Cummins L9 (2017- 2024) (IC RE only)

=== Transmission ===
Unlike the 3800 conventional, the 3000/3900 were only produced with automatic transmissions.

- Allison AT545
- Allison MT643
- Allison World Transmission (MD3060/3560)
- Allison 3000PTS Transmission
- Allison 2500 Transmission

== Availability ==
Manufacturer	Model Name	Production Years	Notes
International 3900 buses
American Transportation Corporation (AmTran)	Genesis; FE	1992-1997; 1998-2002	The AmTran Genesis and AmTran FE are evolutions of the Ward Senator.
Carpenter Industries, Inc.	Counselor FE	1991–1992	In 1993, Carpenter switched to a chassis from Spartan Motors.
Les Enterprises Michel Corbeil, Inc.	EMC 1st Premier	1993-1999	The 1st Premier was never sold outside of Canada.
IC Bus	IC FE300	2003–2010	IC Bus was the final user of the 3900 in school bus form.
Ward Body Works	Senator	1990–1992	The Ward Senator was the first bus to use the 3900 chassis.
Wayne Corporation	Lifestar	1991–1992	In 1993, Wayne Wheeled Vehicles restarted production of the Lifestar with a chassis from Crane Carrier Corporation.
International 3000 buses
American Transportation Corporation (AmTran)	AmTran RE3000	1996-2002	The AmTran RE was the debut model of the Navistar 3000 chassis.
IC Bus	IC RE200; IC RE300; RE-Series; RC-Series (commercial)	2003–2024	
Les Enterprises Michel Corbeil, Inc.	Corbeil Rear Engine	2000	Never sold outside of Canada.

== See also ==
- List of buses
