= Conway Bus Plant =

School bus plant in Conway, Arkansas, U.S.

- Operated: 1933–2010
- Location: 600 Dave Ward Drive; Conway, Arkansas, United States
- Coordinates: 35°4′11″N 92°26′1″W
- Industry: Automotive
- Products: school buses
- Employees: 477 (2009)
- Area: 160 acres (65 ha)
- Volume: 750,000 square feet (70,000 m^{2})
- Owner: Navistar International

Conway Bus Plant was a IC Bus manufacturing plant in Conway, Arkansas owned by Navistar International.

== History ==
The plant was established in 1933 when Ward Body Works was founded in Conway by Dave Ward.

IC Corporation announced potential layoffs of up to 500 workers at the Conway plant (which employed approximately 1,000) in June 2007. Demand for school buses were affected by a price hike in the 2007 model year due to more stringent emissions regulations. School districts increased their purchases of the 2006 model year buses, which were $5,000 to $7,000 less than the 2007 model year buses, and the Conway plant was producing approximately 30 buses per day, down from 50 buses per day during the peak demand.

Although the company later announced no layoffs would occur in 2007, the layoffs materialized on January 11, 2008, when IC Corporation announced a layoff of about 300 employees at the Conway, Arkansas Bus Plant. This was just under the maximum proportion of employees that could be laid off in Conway without the company violating the WARN Act, which requires employers to give 60 days notice of a mass layoff or plant closing. In addition to the layoffs, the company also announced a 50 percent reduction in bus production at the Conway plant. IC Corp. officials cited a lack of new orders as the reason for the layoffs. However, the company had recently announced increased production at the plant in Tulsa, Oklahoma. This stoked fears in Conway that the company was planning to shut down the plant in the near future and move all production to the newer, and non-union, Tulsa plant.

170 more workers were laid off at the Conway plant in March 2009. At the time, production had slowed to 16 buses per day, and following the layoffs, "cancellation of a huge order" resulted in production dropping to eight buses per day.

On November 5, 2009, IC Bus announced it will close its school bus manufacturing plant in Conway, Arkansas, projecting elimination of 477 jobs. The Conway facilities would serve as fabrication shops and manufacture parts, but would no longer produce complete buses. The company cited low demand by school districts and contractors during the recessionary economic climate in the United States. "We have to consolidate our bus-assembly operations into one facility," Navistar spokesman Roy Wiley said. "Unfortunately for Conway, Tulsa is a much newer facility." The facility ceased producing school buses on January 18, 2010.

Navistar sold off the Conway property in 2014. The Conway property was acquired by DBG Canada Ltd., a manufacturer of parts for the heavy truck industry, in 2017, and DBG announced it would make Conway its United States headquarters.

== Products made ==
- Ward/AmTran Volunteer/CS (1973–2002)
- Ward Coachette (c.1973–1980?)
- Ward President (c.1975–1989)
- Ward Patriot (1982–1991)
- Ward/AmTran Vanguard (1982–1996)
- International IC/IC CE (2000–2010)
- Ward Senator/AmTran Genesis/IC FE (1990–2010)
- IC RE (1996–2008)
