= IC Bus CE Series =

Type C IC school bus model

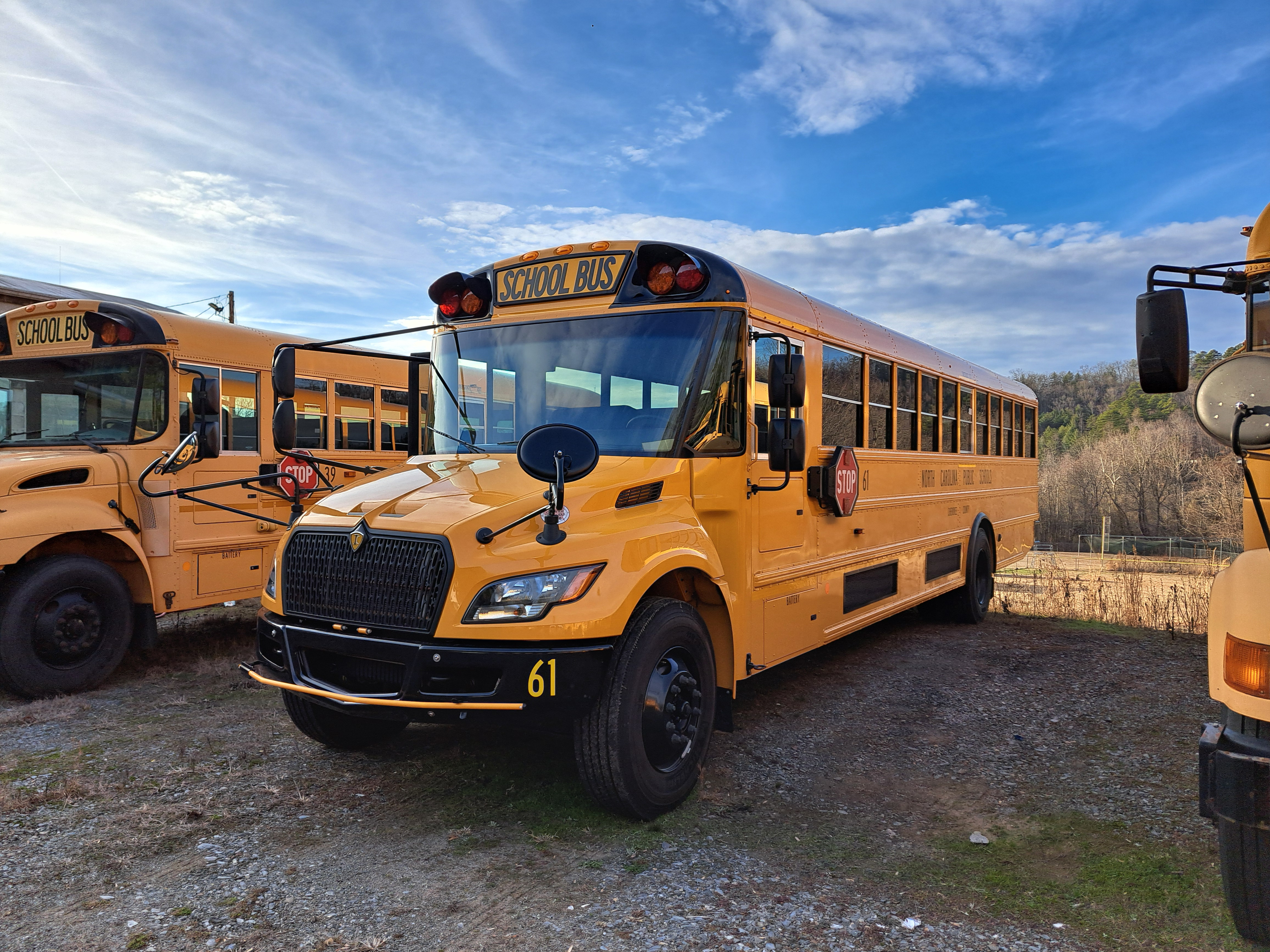
- 2026 IC CE

Overview
- Type: Cowled-chassis school bus
- Manufacturer: IC Bus (International)
- Production: 2000–present
- Assembly: United States: Conway, Arkansas (Conway Bus Plant) (2000–2010); Tulsa, Oklahoma (Tulsa Bus Plant) (2001–present)

Body and chassis
- Class: Type C (conventional)
- Body style: Body-on-frame (cowled chassis): School bus; Commercial bus
- Doors: entrance (two doors, passenger side) emergency exit (single door, rear)
- Floor type: traditional stepwell floor
- Chassis: International 3800 (2001–2004); International 3300 (2005–2024); International MV (2025–present)
- Related: International 3300

Powertrain
- Engine: Navistar DT466 210–255 hp (2000–2007); Navistar MaxxForce DT 210–255 hp (2007–2010); Navistar MaxxForce DT 215–260 hp (2010–2014); International PSI 8.8L V8; Cummins ISB6.7 200–260 hp (2014–2017); Cummins B6.7 220–300 hp (2017–present)
- Capacity: 29–83
- Transmission: Allison PTS 2500 5-speed automatic (standard)

Dimensions
- Length: 16'2" – 34'11"
- Width: 96 in (2,438 mm)
- Curb weight: 19,500–33,000 lb (8,845–14,969 kg) (GVWR)

Chronology
- Predecessor: Ward/AmTran Volunteer/CS (1973–2002)

The IC Bus CE Series, also known as the IC CE, is a school bus that is manufactured by IC Bus, a subsidiary of International Motors. Originally introduced in 2000 as the International IC ("Integrated Coach"), the CE was the first school bus model to have a integrated chassis and body. It is primarily used in school bus applications, as well as some commercial applications. IC Bus manufactures the CE in Tulsa, Oklahoma, United States. Originally, the CE was also manufactured at the former AmTran/Ward plant in Conway, Arkansas; this facility is now closed.

== Background ==
In 1991, Navistar International acquired one-third of the stock of American Transportation Corporation. As part of the purchase, Navistar acquired an option to buy the rest of AmTran, which was completed in April 1995. The AmTran purchase marked the first purchase of a school bus body manufacturer by a chassis manufacturer or supplier, as several more (Carpenter Industries and Thomas Built Buses) were acquired in 1998.

As a result of the purchase, AmTran changed the Volunteer school bus body design for 1997, named the AmTran CS. The driver's compartment was redesigned with updated controls and the flat windshield was replaced by a 4-piece design to improve forward visibility. However, with the discontinuation of the Ford B series after the 1998 model year, the International 3800 became the sole chassis for the AmTran CS.

When the number of school bus manufacturers had declined from seven to three in ten years, International began development of a next-generation AmTran Conventional with an integrated school bus body. Tom Cellitti, vice president and general manager of International Bus Vehicle Center, announced that International will develop the new integrated conventional by focusing on the customer and getting rid of the waste in the system. The electric configuration is rated at 342 horsepower while the diesel configuration equipped with the 6.7 Cummins is rated between 200-260 horsepower.

== Design history ==
=== 2001–2004 ===
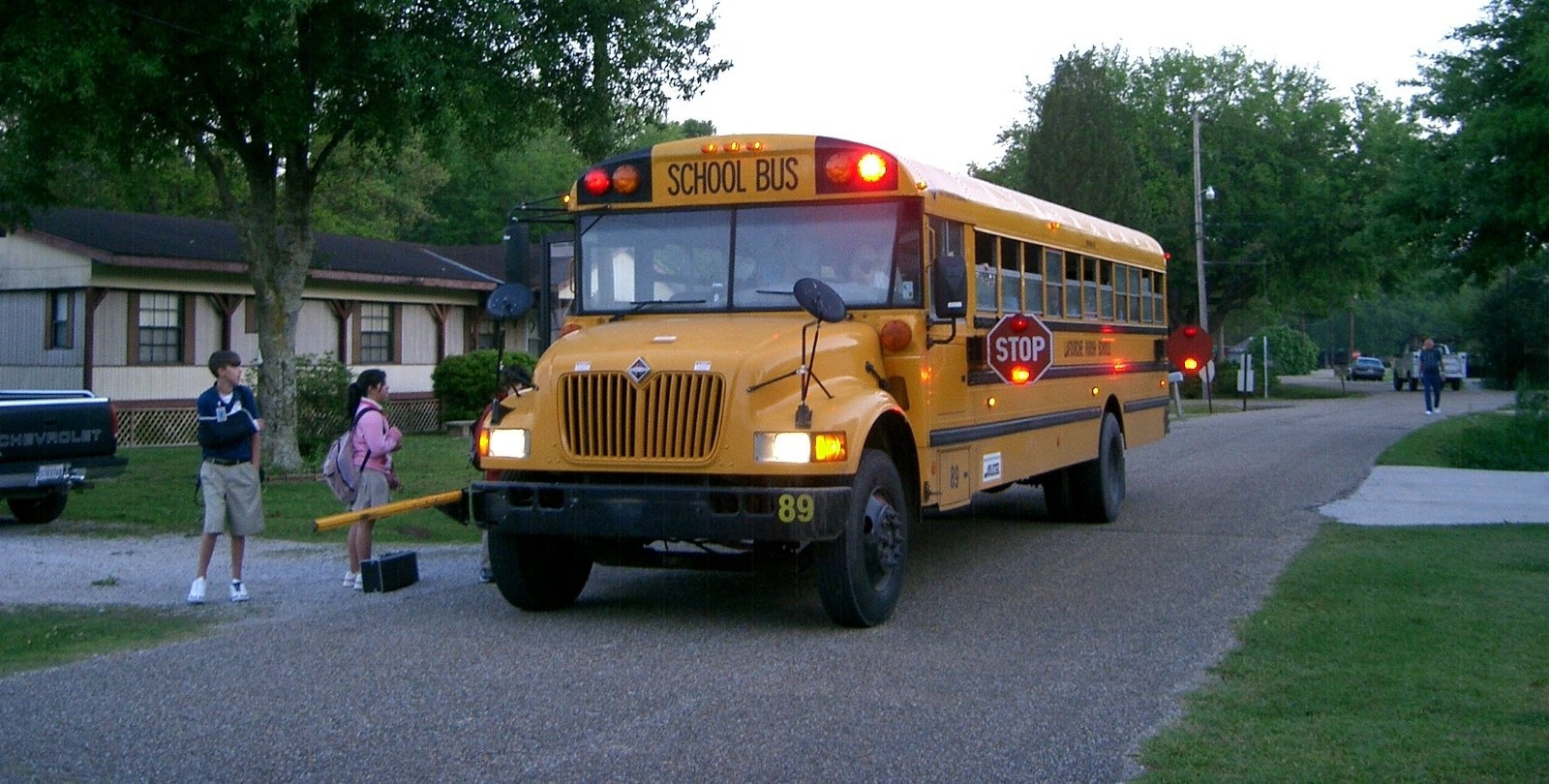
#89, a 2002 International IC CE300 operated by Lafourche Parish Schools

In 1999, Navistar announced the International IC, a fully integrated school bus with a modified 3800 chassis and a integrated AmTran school bus body. The bus would be produced at AmTran's Conway, Arkansas facility and the newer Tulsa, Oklahoma facility. While still based on the International 3800 and sharing much of the body with its Ward/AmTran Volunteer/CS predecessor, the new bus introduced a redesigned drivers compartment and enlarged windshield. To distinguish the model from other buses sharing the 3800 chassis, the hood of the IC was given its own grille and badging (marking the first visual update to International medium-duty trucks since 1989). Production began by American Transportation Corporation in April 2000 for the 2001 model year.

Tulsa, Oklahoma production of the IC began in January 2001 with 2 buses per day. The facility officially opened on June 5, 2001 with approximately 400 employees and one vehicle produced daily. International announced plans to increase production to 15 vehicles per day due to demand.

The Conway plant was becoming a dedicated Type D bus plant when the AmTran FE and RE were given the "International" badge, but some new school buses still used the "AmTran" badging. In 2002, for the 2003 model year, Navistar (at the time, International Truck and Engine Corporation) renamed its bus subsidiary from American Transportation Corporation to IC Corporation. After a minor revision, the IC adopted the CE-Series name (to match the FE/RE-Series transit-style buses).

=== 2005–2024 ===
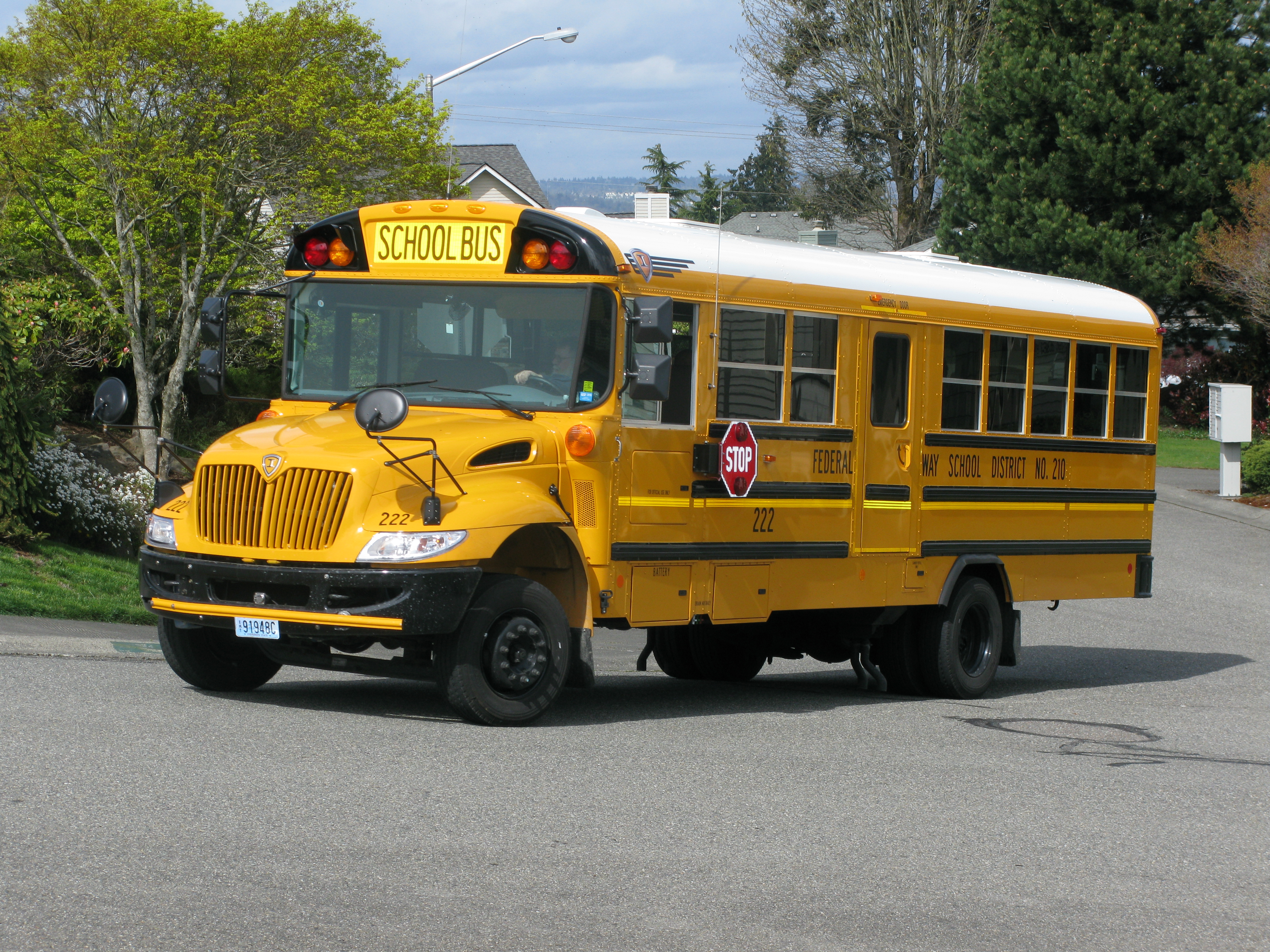
#222, a 2010 IC CE300 operated by Federal Way Public Schools

In November 2003, IC Corporation unveiled the new CE, featuring an all-new International 3300 chassis and body. The all-new CE series introduced a one-piece, flat-glass windshield. Production began in 2004 for the 2005 model year.

Also, IC entered the Canadian school bus market after selecting Leeds Transit for the Ontario market. Before that, AmTran/IC Corporation products including the International IC, were sold in the United States only. In 2006, IC Corporation worked with Enova Systems to create a hybrid diesel-electric bus. This school bus prototype includes an International VT365 engine with an 80 kW Enova hybrid-electric powertrain, incorporating a transmission, batteries, and permanent magnet motor. The IC "wing" logo was revised slightly in 2012 for 2014 production (with Navistar script added to the emblem and to the rear bumper).

In response to the failure of its EGR emissions strategy to meet emissions standards, Navistar began to phase out MaxxForce diesel engines in favor of Cummins-produced engines. The Cummins ISB6.7 was introduced as an option for 2014 production for the CE, becoming the standard engine for the 2015 model year. At the end of 2021, IC Bus announced the introduction of a 35-foot-8-inch body length for the CE (exempting the length of the hood), offering a capacity of up to 83 passengers. The largest-capacity Type C school bus ever produced, the new option retained the previously-offered 276-inch wheelbase.

=== 2025–present ===
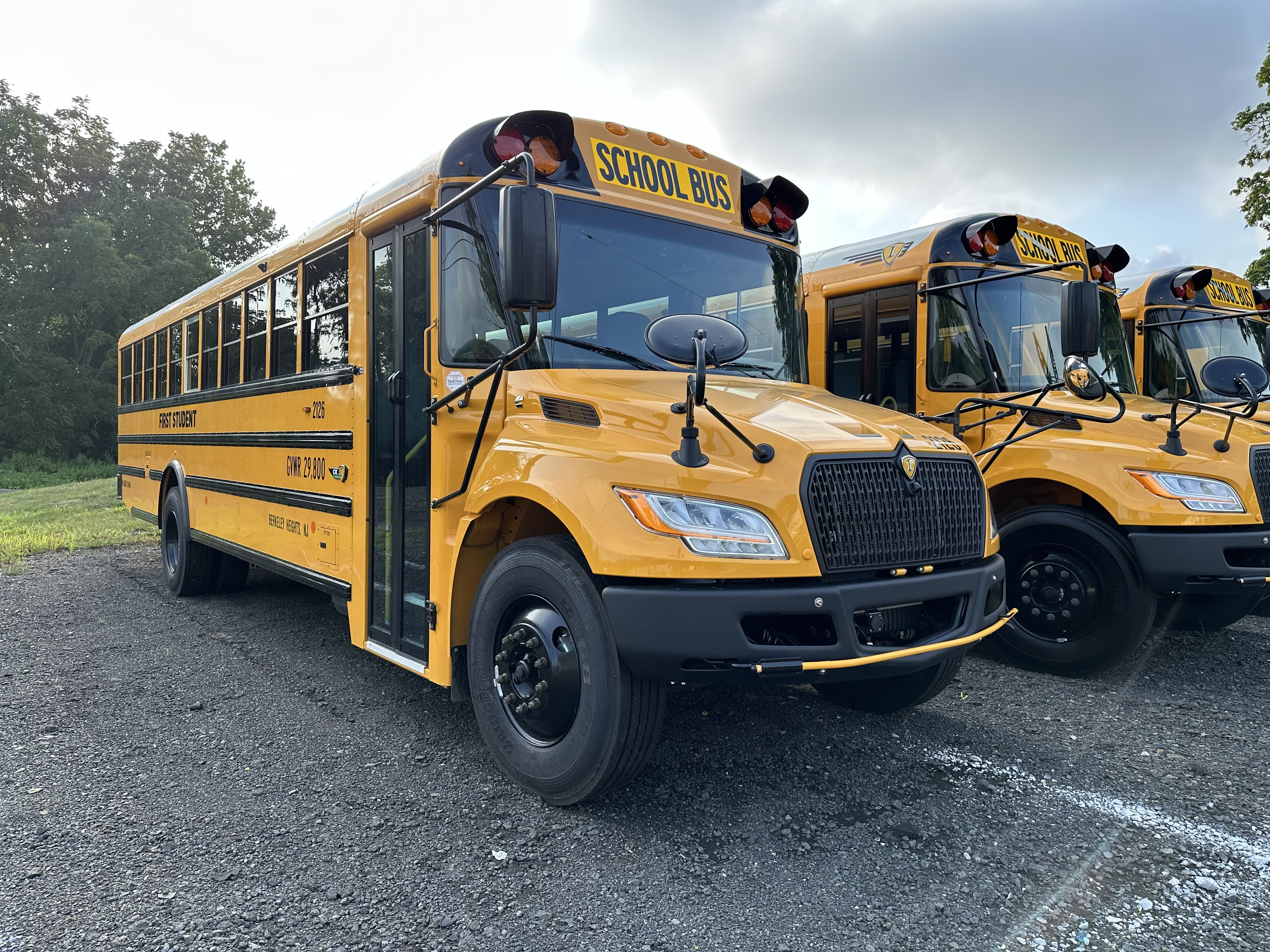
#2126, a 2025 IC CE operated by First Student

On July 14, 2023, IC unveiled a third generation of the CE series for 2025 production. Using the updated International MV as a base chassis, the new CE added a taller, wider windshield with asymmetrical car-style windshield wipers (much like the Thomas C2) to the body structure (rearward of the driver seat, much of the bodywork was carried over); the dashboard of the MV was integrated in its entirety. As of initial production, the only engine options for the new CE are the Cummins B6.7 diesel and the electric motor. Production began in late 2023 for the 2025 model year.

On October 21, 2025, the IC school bus manufacturing plant in Tulsa reached 250,000 units.

== Variants ==
=== IC BE ===
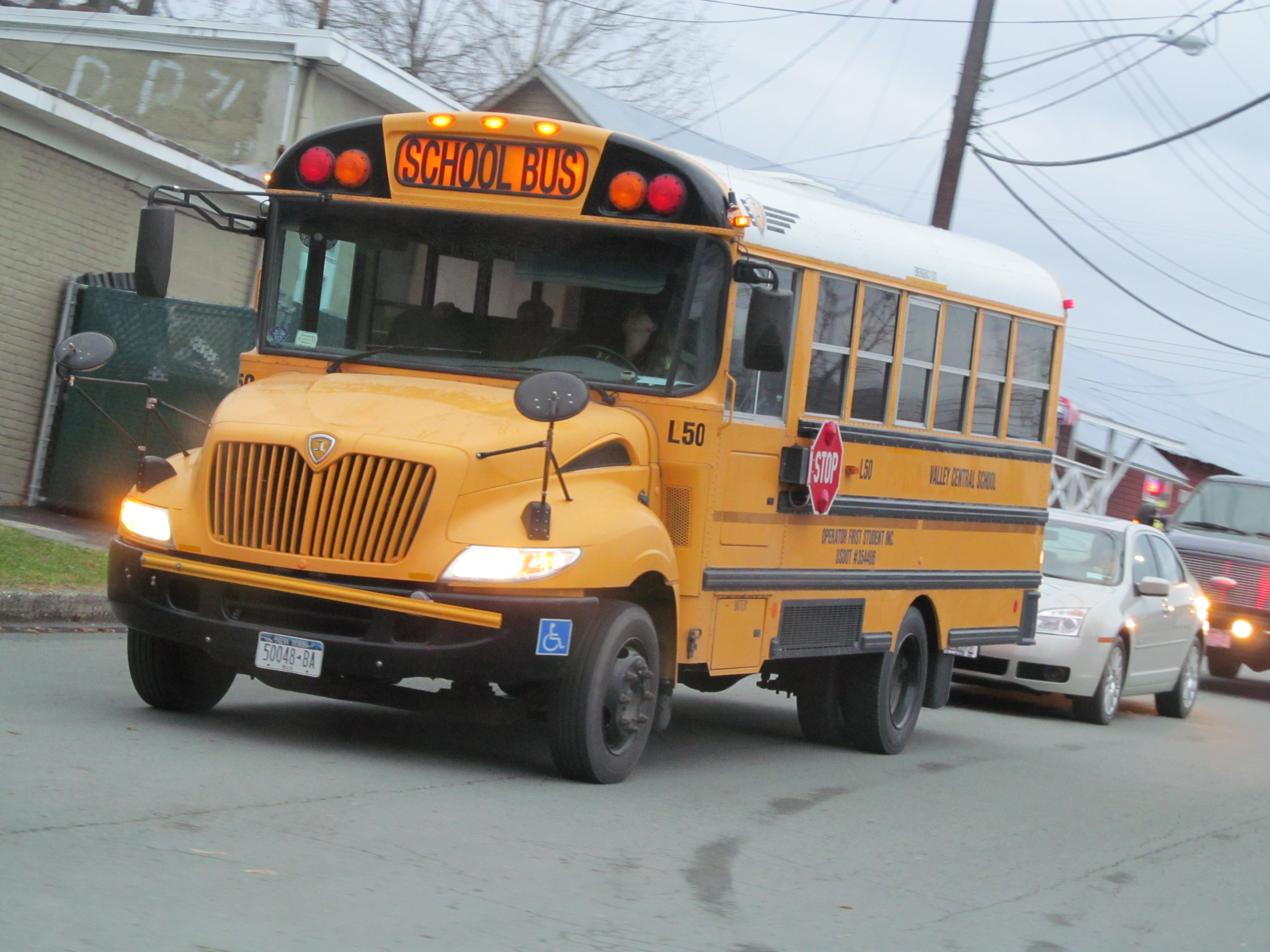
2006–2015 IC BE200

In 2004, IC produced its first small school bus for the 2006 model year, the 30-passenger BE200. In place of a cutaway van chassis, the BE adopted a lower-profile version of the 3300 chassis. Produced primarily as a school bus and as its commercial-market derivatives, the BE was designed for operators transporting special-needs passengers. Externally similar to the CE, the smaller BE was designed with a flat-floor interior, maximizing the available space for wheelchair passengers.

Unlike the larger CE, the BE was only sold with V8 engines and hydraulic brakes (200-series classification) due to having a low-profile chassis.

=== Hybrid diesel-electric bus ===
In 2008, IC Corporation introduced a diesel-electric IC CE school bus, featuring a MaxxForce DT and a Enova-supplied electric motor. The buses are claimed to provide approximately 40% to 65% better fuel economy, but cost about two and a half times more than a standard diesel bus ($210,000 versus $80,000). As Enova went bankrupt in 2014, IC Bus has discontinued the hybrid option, once again leaving the CE with the diesel powertrain option.

=== Alternative fuel powertrains ===
In 2015, IC debuted its first alternative-fuel vehicle, showing a propane-powered CE-Series with a PSI 8.8L V8 engine. In 2016, the same engine was introduced in a gasoline-fueled configuration. Both powertrains were removed for 2025, but only the gasoline powertrain was returning for the 2026 model year.

=== Electric CE bus (formerly chargE) ===
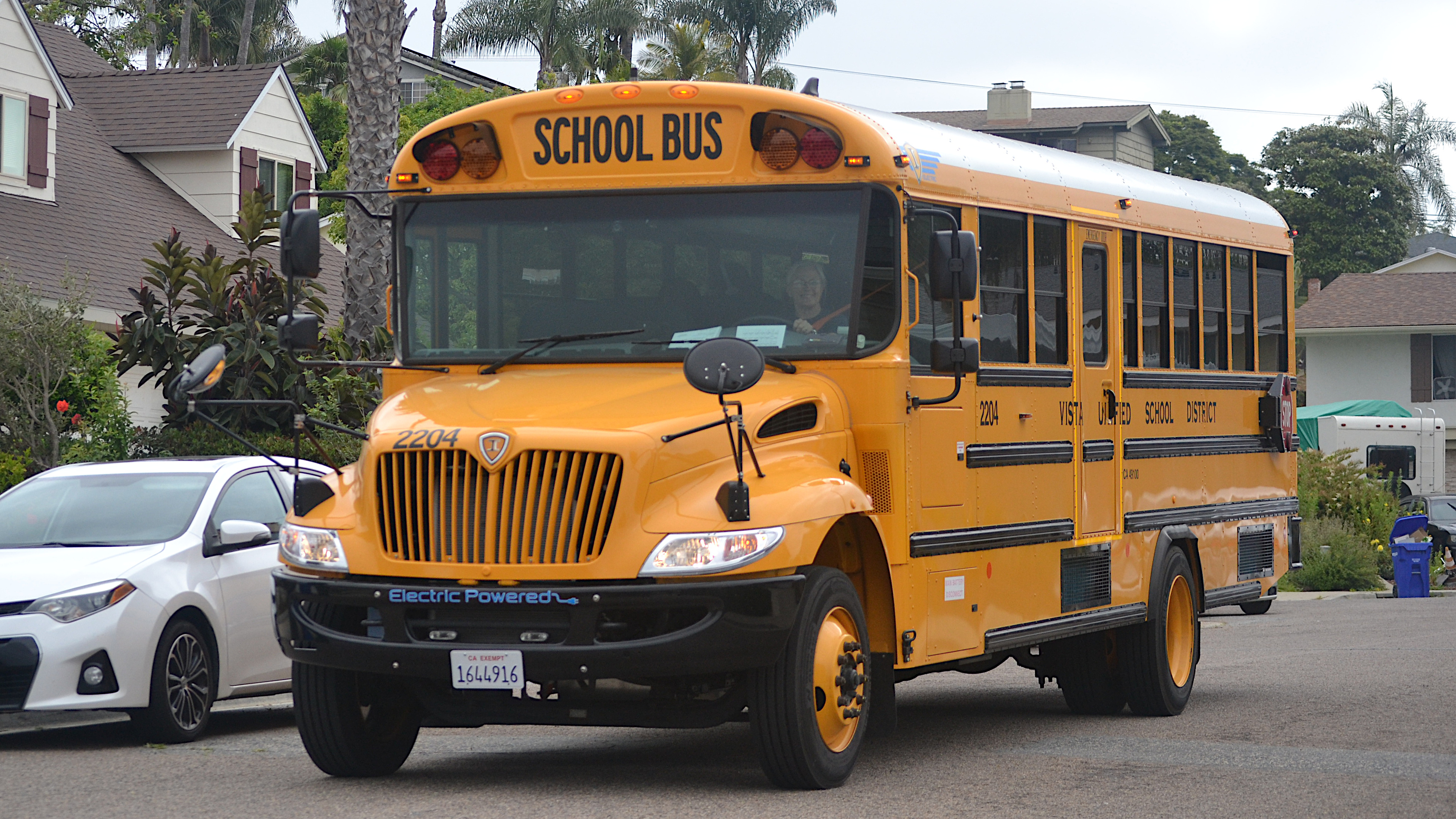
2022 IC CE in California

On November 7, 2017, IC Bus announced the chargE, an all-electric prototype CE Series bus delivering up to 260 kilowatts (350 hp) in power using a Volkswagen Truck & Bus Group-supplied common group electric drivetrain. It is the second electric vehicle to be delivered from the Navistar-Volkswagen alliance. The chargE started production as the Electric IC CE Series in 2020. In May 2021, the first electric CE buses were delivered to Canada.

The battery-electric CE is available with a 105, 210, or 315 kilowatt-hour battery capacity allowing for a range of over 70, 130, or 200 miles. The batteries can be recharged with a Level 1, Level 2, or DC fast charger. A 255 kilowatt (peak) permanent magnet motor is mounted at the rear and drives the rear wheels.

== Model specifications ==
Originally, the IC came with the Navistar DT-466 or DT-466E inline-6 engines, as well as the T444E V8 engine. After 2003, the IC CE200 came with the Navistar VT-365 engine. Currently, the IC CE comes with the Cummins B6.7 inline-6 engine.

Model name	CE 200 (discontinued)	CE 300
Seating capacity	to 81	to 83
Overall length (inches)	16'2" to 34'11"	
Body width (exterior)	96 inches (2.4 m)	
Fuel type(s)	Diesel	Diesel; Gasoline; Electric
Engine	Navistar T 444E (2000–2003) (200–230 hp or 150–170 kW); Navistar VT 365 (2003–2007) (200–230 hp or 150–170 kW); Navistar MaxxForce 7 (200–230 hp or 150–170 kW, 2007–2010) (220–260 hp or 160–190 kW, 2010–2014)	Navistar DT 466 (2000–2007) (210–255 hp or 157–190 kW); Navistar MaxxForce DT (210–255 hp or 157–190 kW, 2007–2010) (215–260 hp or 160–194 kW, 2010–2014); Cummins ISB 6.7 (2014–2017) (200–260 hp or 150–190 kW); Cummins B6.7 (2017–present) (220–300 hp or 160–220 kW); PSI 8.8l V8 (270 hp or 200 kW) (2015–2024) Propane/Gasoline engine; Cummins B6.7 Octane (2025–present) (200–300 hp or 150–220 kW); TM4 SUMO (2020–present) Electric motor
Transmission	Allison PTS 1000; Allison PTS 2100 (up to 2010); Allison PTS 2200 (up to 2010); Allison PTS 2500 5-speed automatic (standard); Allison PTS 3000 6-speed automatic; Eaton Procision 7-speed automatic (discontinued)	

== Comparable products ==
- Blue Bird Vision
- Thomas Saf-T-Liner C2

== See also ==
- International 3800 (2001–2004)
- International 3300 (2005–2024)
- International MV (2025–present)
