= IC Bus FE Series =

Type D IC school bus model

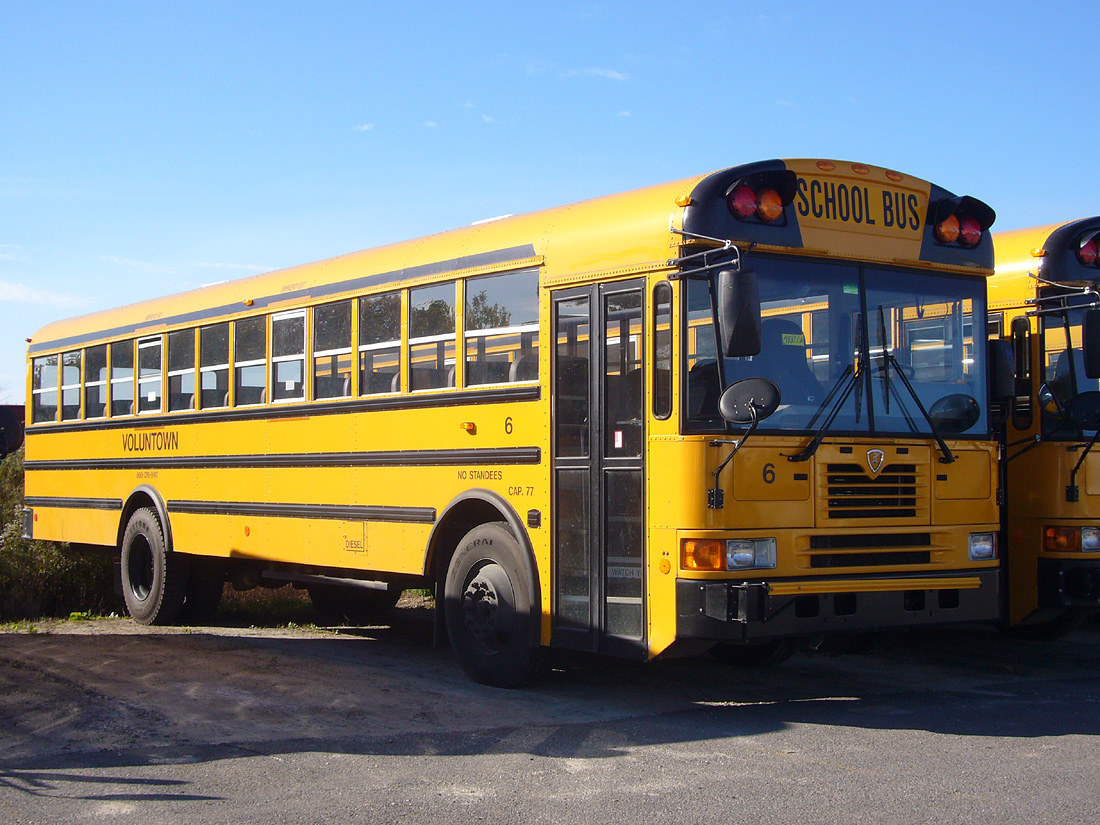

Overview
- Manufacturer: IC Bus (Navistar)
- Production: 1990–2010
- Assembly: United States: Conway, Arkansas (Conway Bus Plant); Tulsa, Oklahoma (Tulsa Bus Plant)

Body and chassis
- Class: Type D (transit-style)
- Body style: School bus; Commercial bus
- Platform: International 3900FC
- Chassis: Front-engine, stripped frame
- Related: Ward Senator; AmTran Genesis; AmTran/IC RE

Powertrain
- Engine: Navistar DT 466 210–255 hp (1990–2007); Navistar MaxxForce DT 210–255 hp (2007–2010)
- Transmission: Allison PTS 2500 5-speed automatic (standard)

Dimensions
- Wheelbase: 144.0–234.0 in (3,658–5,944 mm)
- Length: 314.1–476.1 in (7,978–12,093 mm)
- Width: 93 in (2,362 mm)
- Curb weight: 29,500–37,000 lb (13,381–16,783 kg) (GVWR)

Chronology
- Predecessor: Ward President (c. 1975–1990)

The IC Bus FE Series (also known as the IC FE) is a model line of buses that was manufactured by IC Bus. Taking its name from its front-engine configuration, the FE was produced primarily for yellow school bus use; some units were manufactured for commercial applications.

The IC FE was introduced in 1990 by Ward Body Works as the Ward Senator; several ownership changes during the 1990s led to the vehicle becoming the IC FE for 2003 production. The bus body was fitted to the International 3900FC chassis.

From 1990 to 2010, the model line was manufactured in the Ward Body Works facility in Conway, Arkansas.

== Design history ==
=== Ward Senator/AmTran Genesis ===
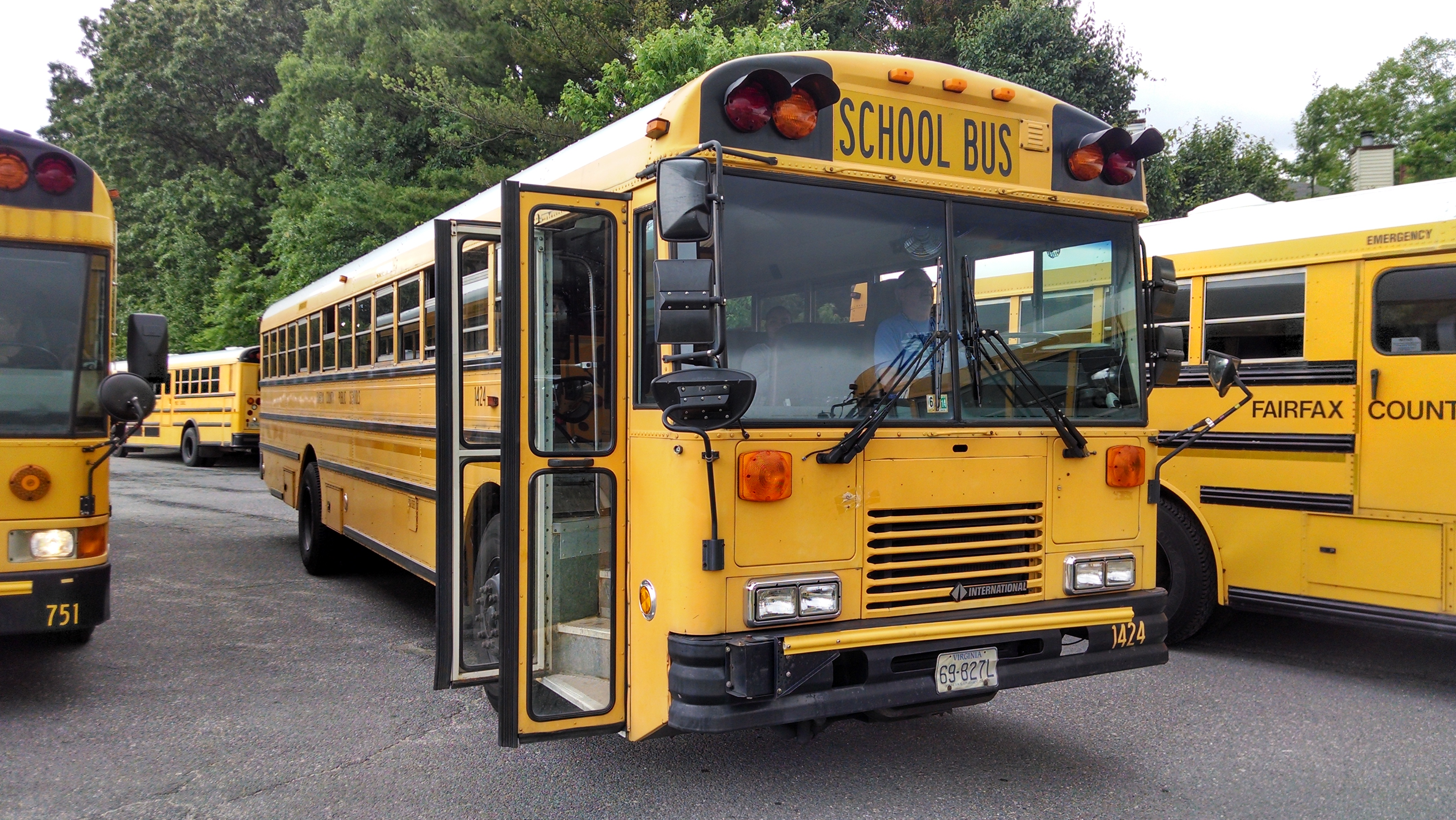
1996 AmTran Genesis

For 1990 production, AmTran modernized its transit-style school bus line, replacing the Ward President with the all-new Ward Senator. Developed in response to the Blue Bird TC/2000 and Wayne Lifestar, the Senator replaced the GMC S7 chassis (discontinued for 1990) with an International-sourced chassis. Along with making a diesel engine standard, the 3900FC only utilized inline-6 engines (the DT408 and DT466 I6 turbodiesels), improving both passenger and driver compartment access over a V8 engine.

Following the partial acquisition of AmTran by Navistar at the end of 1990, the company began to phase out the Ward brand name, with the Senator adopting the AmTran Genesis name during 1992 production.

=== AmTran FE/IC FE Series ===
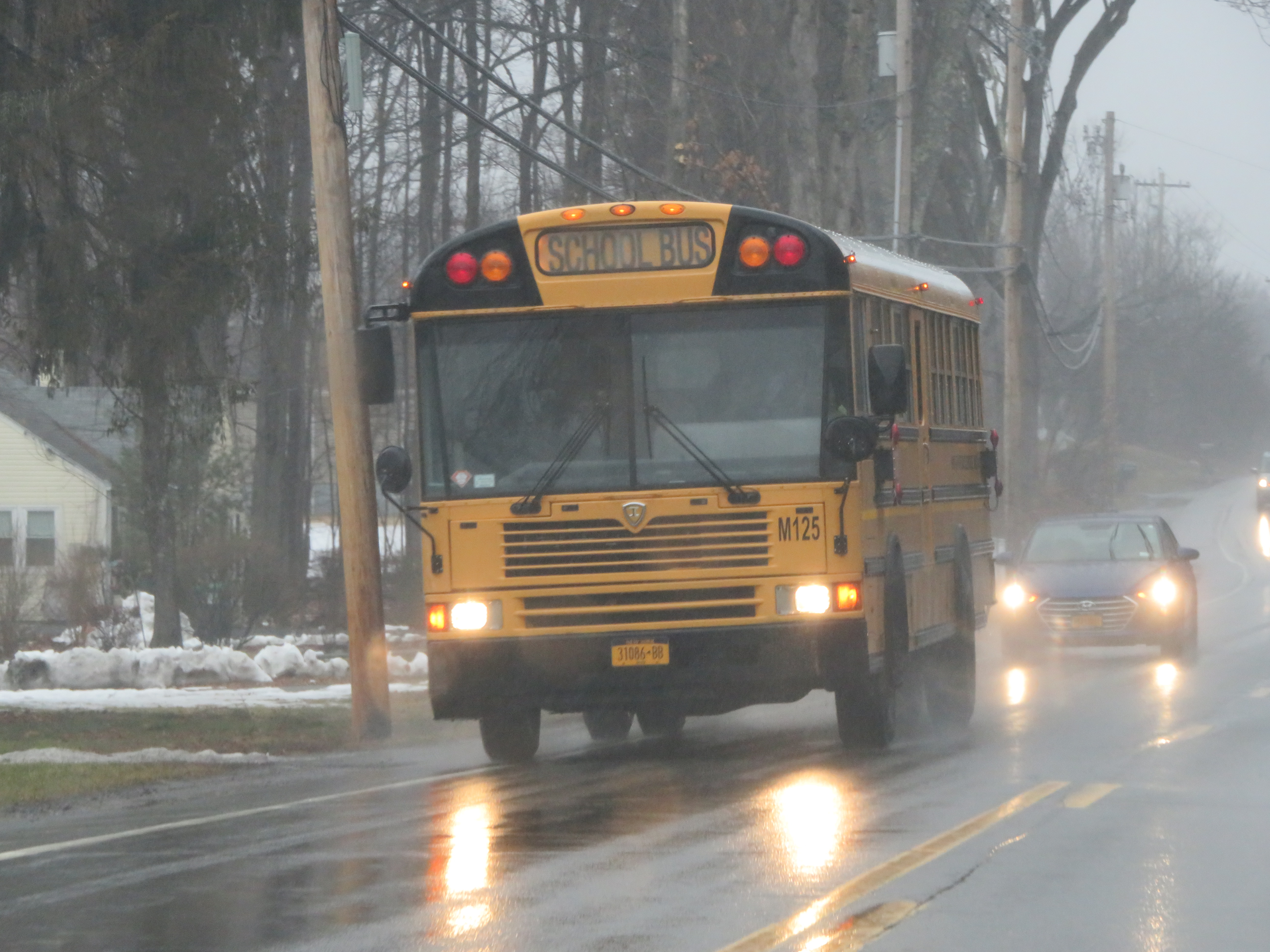
2008-2010 IC FE300. Note the wider grille.

In 1999, the model line underwent a major update, with AmTran renaming the Genesis as the AmTran FE. Along with standardizing the DT466E engine, the entry door was widened further. Along with adopting a visual resemblance to the RE (with the exception of its grille and air intakes), the FE began to adopt a further degree of commonality, with both model lines receiving a redesigned driver's compartment. To improve serviceability, the front of the vehicle was fitted with additional access panels for mechanical, electrical, and electronic components.

Following the introduction of the IC conventional during 2000, the AmTran FE began to use the "International" branding. In the spring of 2002, AmTran (American Transportation Corporation) ceased to exist, with parent company Navistar reorganizing it as IC Corporation; the AmTran FE was renamed the IC FE.
