= IC Bus =

American bus manufacturer

- Formerly: IC Corporation (Integrated Coach Corporation)
- Type: Subsidiary
- Industry: Manufacturing (Transportation)
- Predecessor: American Transportation Corporation (AmTran); Ward Body Works
- Founded: 2002
- Headquarters: 2601 International Drive; Lisle, Illinois 60532
- Number of locations: 1: Tulsa, Oklahoma (assembly)
- Area served: North America
- Key people: John McKinney, President
- Products: School Buses; Commercial Buses; Transit Buses
- Parent: International Motors
- Website: www.icbus.com

IC Bus (originally IC Corporation) is an American bus manufacturer. Headquartered in Lisle, Illinois, IC is a wholly owned subsidiary of International Motors. Established in 2002 by Navistar through the reorganization of subsidiary manufacturer AmTran, IC currently produces school buses and commercial-use buses for multiple applications.

The IC name stands for "Integrated Coach", referring to how the vehicles are nearly completely assembled under a single corporate structure. For all vehicles, the body and chassis are assembled within the same manufacturing facility; the latter is designed by parent company Navistar (prior to 2015, Navistar also supplied the engine). While using a chassis and hood shared with International-brand trucks, IC Bus vehicles have separate badging.

IC vehicles are produced at the Navistar Tulsa Bus Plant in Tulsa, Oklahoma. Prior to 2010, they were also assembled at the former AmTran/Ward facility in Conway, Arkansas.

== History ==
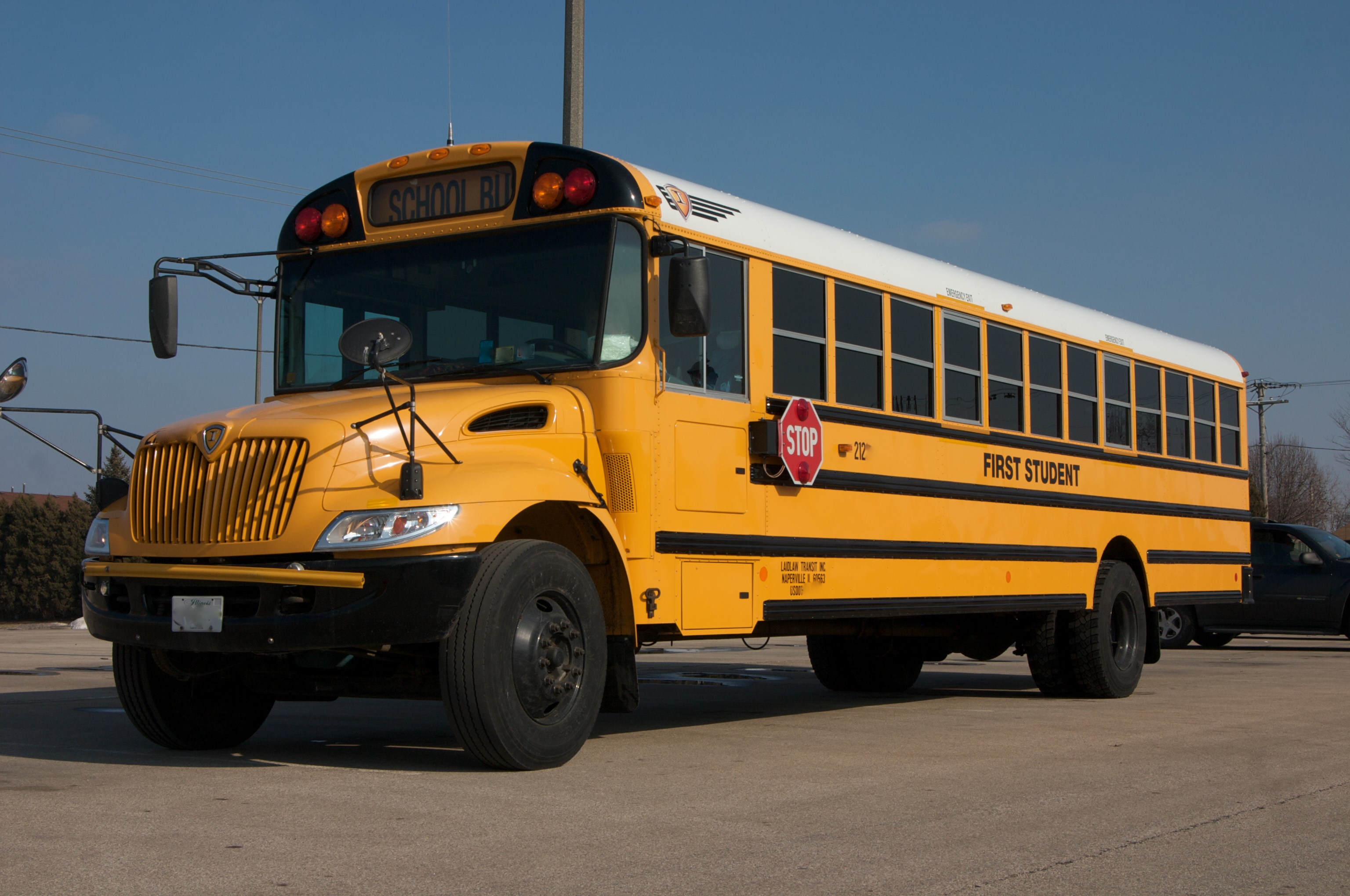
2005-2024 IC CE

Through its predecessor company AmTran, IC traces its roots to 1933, founded as Ward Body Works in Conway, Arkansas. Navistar predecessor International Harvester commenced chassis production 11 years earlier, entering production in 1922. Following the exit of several manufacturing firms from school bus production over the previous decade, IC would be the first newly established manufacturer in the 2000s.

=== 2000s ===
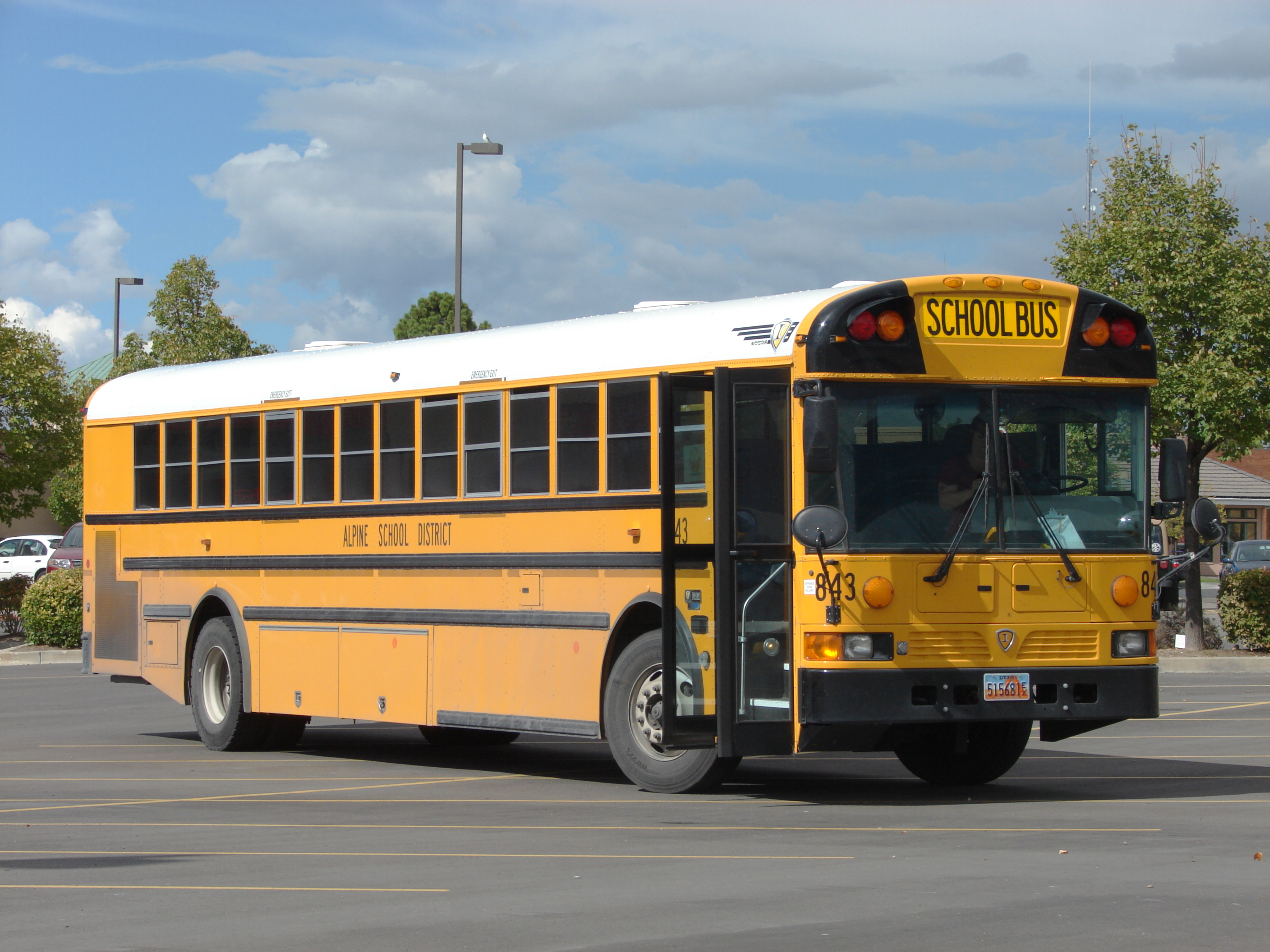
2015-2024 IC RE

In 2000, the IC name came into use for the first time, as AmTran introduced an updated version of its conventional-style bus body. While still based upon the International 3800 and sharing much of the body with its AmTran Volunteer/CS predecessor, the new bus introduced a redesigned drivers compartment and enlarged windshield. Named the International IC (IC standing for Integrated Coach/Chassis), the new bus emphasized how the entire vehicle was produced under the corporate entity of Navistar (who had purchased AmTran outright in 1995). To distinguish the International IC from other buses sharing the 3800 chassis, the hood of the IC was given its own grille and badging (marking the first visual update to International medium-duty trucks since 1989).

Following the introduction of the IC; AmTran's other product lines adopted the International brand name and badging for the body in addition to the chassis. In 2002, Navistar (at the time, International Truck and Engine) renamed its bus subsidiary to IC Corporation, and retired the AmTran brand name. After a minor revision, the IC adopted the CE-Series name (to match the FE/RE-Series transit-style buses).

During the mid-2000s, IC began an overhaul of its product line. For 2005, the International 3300 was introduced as a cowled-chassis variant of the International 4000-series (DuraStar), becoming the first completely new cowled chassis from International since 1979. For 2006, IC produced its first small school bus, the 30-passenger BE200. In place of a cutaway van chassis, the BE adopted a lower-profile version of the 3300 chassis. Externally similar to the CE, the smaller BE was designed with a flat-floor interior.

To comply with 2007 EPA emissions standards, IC buses adopted MaxxForce diesel engines for 2007, including the MaxxForce 7 6.4L V8 and the MaxxForce DT 7.6L I6. For 2008, to improve engine ventilation, the FE was given a wider grille, with the BE and CE adopting the redesigned front bumper of the International DuraStar. In April 2009, IC Corporation changed its name to IC Bus.

==== Commercial bus production ====
During its existence, the commercial product offerings of AmTran had been strictly derived from its school bus bodies, consisting as a small portion of its sales. In 2006, IC launched an expansion of its product range. Alongside the existing commercial derivatives of the BE, CE, and RE, the company introduced buses based on a cutaway-cab version of the International DuraStar. The HC was a range of shuttle buses; the LC was a paratransit bus with a low-floor configuration.

=== 2010s ===
For 2010, IC underwent an overhaul of its product line. The FE-series (which entered production in 1990 as the Ward Senator, later becoming the AmTran Genesis) was discontinued, leaving the RE as its sole transit-style bus offering. At the other end of the size spectrum, IC introduced two cutaway-cab buses derived from the International TerraStar truck. Slotted below the HC, the AC was a commercial shuttle bus, while the AE marked the first cutaway-cab school bus produced by the company. While using a smaller truck line for a donor chassis, the AE was offered in a higher seating capacity than the BE, up to 36 passengers.

In a branding change, from 2010 onward, Navistar badged the International 3200 (the cutaway-cab version of the DuraStar) as an IC, regardless of body manufacturer. The IC "wing" logo was revised slightly in 2013 for 2014 production (with Navistar script added to the emblem and to the rear bumper).

In response to the failure of its EGR emissions strategy to meet emissions standards, Navistar began to phase out MaxxForce diesel engines in favor of Cummins-produced engines. In the CE, the Cummins ISB6.7 was introduced as an option for 2014 production, becoming the standard engine for 2015. In 2017, the MaxxForce DT was replaced by a Cummins L9 diesel for the RE series, with a Cummins B6.7 introduced during 2018 for the CE.

In the mid-2010s, IC centralized production around school buses. After 2014, the AE/AC, BE, and LC were discontinued. For 2018, the HC was replaced by the TC (as the MV replaced the DuraStar); within the shuttle bus segment, IC reverted to a role of chassis provider, no longer producing completely-bodied vehicles.

Alongside the TC medium-duty cutaway cab, IC Bus currently produces the CE and RE-series as school buses/MFSABs (activity buses); both model lines are also offered in commercial applications (derived from the school bus bodies).

==== Alternative-fuel strategy ====
In the United States, Navistar was the sole diesel engine manufacturer to pursue the use of exhaust gas recirculation (EGR) to control diesel emissions rather than selective catalytic reduction (SCR). The company claimed EGR posed an advantage in overall fluid economy (measuring combined diesel + urea consumption), although separate testing resulted in an advantage with SCR.

In 2015, IC debuted its first alternative-fuel vehicle, showing a propane-powered CE-Series with a PSI 8.8L V8 engine. In 2016, the same engine was introduced in a gasoline-fueled configuration.

==== Electric bus ====
On November 7, 2017, IC Bus announced the chargE, an all-electric CE Series bus delivering up to 260 kilowatts (350 hp) in power using a Volkswagen Truck & Bus Group-supplied common group electric drivetrain. It is the second electric vehicle to be delivered from the Navistar-Volkswagen alliance. The chargE started production in 2019

=== 2020s ===
At the end of 2021, IC Bus announced the introduction of a 35-foot-8-inch body length for the CE (exempting the length of the hood), offering a capacity of up to 83 passengers. The largest-capacity Type C school bus ever produced, the new option retained the previously-offered 276-inch wheelbase.

In July 2023, IC unveiled a third generation of the CE series for 2025 production. Using the updated International MV as a base chassis, the new CE added a taller, wider windshield to the body structure (rearward of the driver seat, much of the bodywork was carried over); the dashboard of the MV was integrated in its entirety. As of initial production, the third-generation CE is offered with diesel or electric powertrain options (the gasoline/LPG engine has not been made an option).

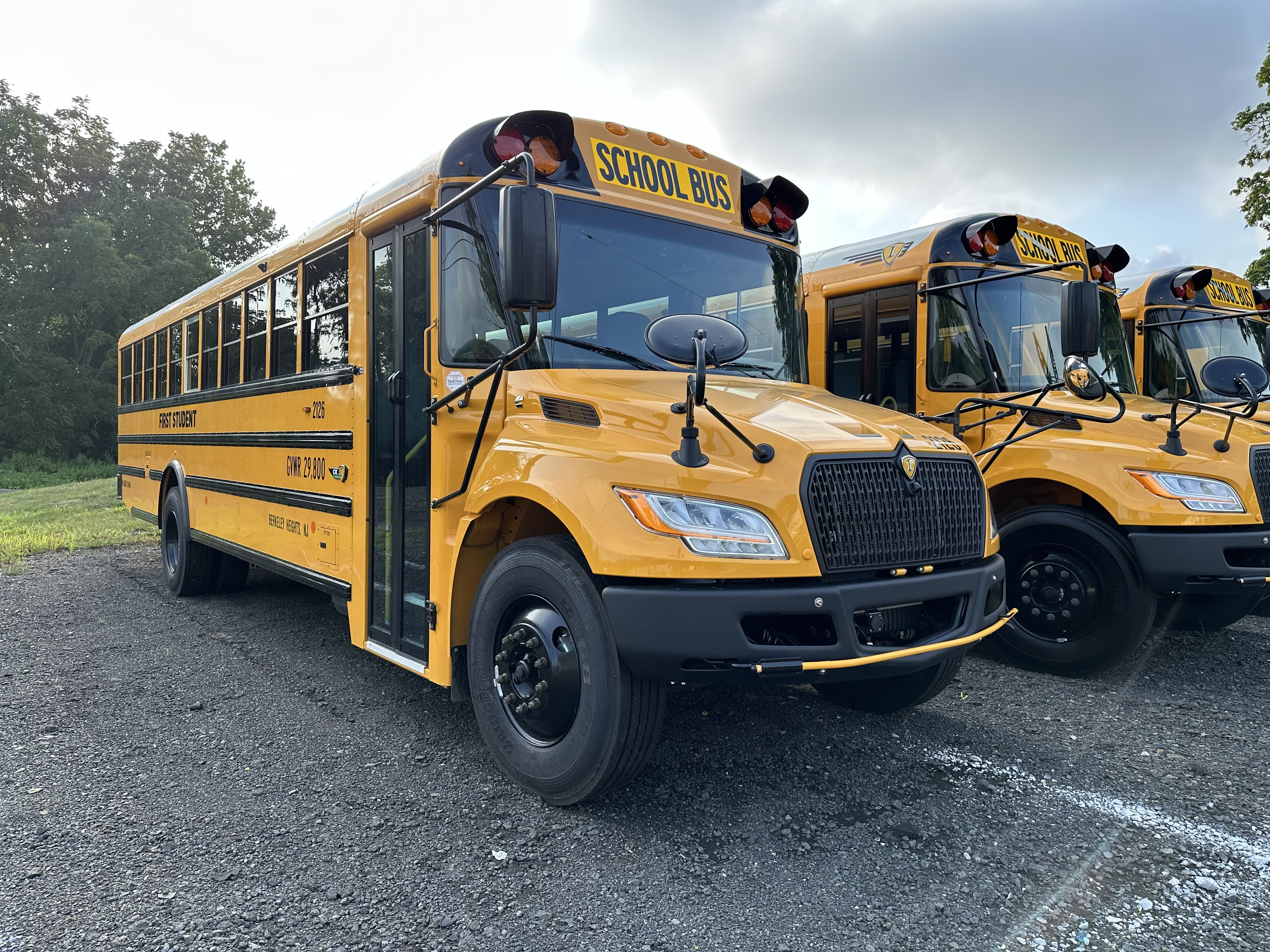
2025-present IC CE

At the end of 2024 production, IC retired the long-running RE Series; coinciding with low overall market demand for rear-engine school buses, IC also cited upgrades in emissions standards for commercial vehicles. Produced with only incremental changes since 1996, the RE Series used the International 3000 chassis, the final variant of the International S-Series remaining in production (45 years after its release).

== Products ==
=== School/commercial buses ===
Model designations

Prior to 2010, IC used the following nomenclature (on school buses) to designate the engine type; subsequently, only the model prefix has been used.

Diesel engine configuration	BE-Series	CE-Series	FE Series	RE Series
Small-displacement V8 (i.e. T444E, VT365, MaxxForce 7)	BE200	CE200		RE200 (Note: Except MaxxForce 7.)
Large-displacement inline-6 (i.e. DT466/E, MaxxForce DT)		CE300	FE300	RE300

IC Bus product line (school buses)
Model name	Production	Vehicle type	Chassis	Notes
AE Series AC Series	2010–2015	Type A (cutaway)	Navistar International: International TerraStar	The AE Series is the first cutaway-chassis school bus from IC Bus, it was dropped from its website in July 2015.; Available as the AC Series shuttle bus and the AE Series school bus, both are based on the International TerraStar.; The AE/AC-Series have a standard flat-floor interior
BE Series	2006–2015	Type B (integrated)	Navistar International: International 3300 (low-GVWR)	The BE Series is a lower-GVWR version of the CE-Series; it is marketed towards customers who transport special-needs students (competing as an alternative to van-based buses). It is also the only Type B school bus to be built on a cowled chassis, compared to others which were built on a stripped chassis.; Apart from its smaller size, the BE differs from the CE on the inside; a flat-floor interior is standard.; The BE also differs from the CE on the wheels; the wheels are smaller than the CE.; As of July 2015, the BE product line was dropped from the web site.; Due to having a low-profile chassis, the BE-Series was only sold with V8 engines (200-series designation).
CE Series	2002–present	Type C (conventional)	Navistar International: International 3800 (2001–2004); International 3300 (2005–2024); International MV (2025–present)	The CE-Series was introduced in 2000 as the International IC and is currently in its third generation (based on the International MV chassis).; The third generation CE-Series bus was officially announced in late June of 2023 and revealed on July 14.; Current powertrain options as of third-generation CE production are the Cummins B6.7 diesel (or gasoline) engine or a fully-electric powertrain. The CE was also formerly available with a PSI 8.8 propane or gasoline engine.
FE Series FC Series	2002–2010	Type D (transit-style): front engine	Navistar International: International 3900	The IC FE was introduced in 1990 as the Ward Senator and later as the AmTran Genesis with gradual updates (1992, 1995, 1998, 2005, 2008).; In April 2010, IC Bus removed the IC FE product literature from its website as dealers announced its discontinuation.; Just like the RC-Series, the commercial variant of the FE was branded as the FC-Series, which was discontinued alongside the FE.; Due to its chassis design, the FE-Series was only sold with inline-six engines (300-series designation).
RE Series RC Series	2002–2024	Type D (transit-style): rear engine	Navistar International: International 3000	The IC RE was introduced in 1996 as the AmTran RE with an interior redesign in late 1998; an exterior update was made in 2005.; Commercial variants were initially branded as the RC-Series, taking on the RE-Series name around 2009.; Discontinued after the 2024 model year.

IC Bus product line (commercial buses)
Model name	Production	Vehicle type	Chassis	Notes
LC Series	2006-2014	Low-floor shuttle bus	Navistar International: International 3200	The LC-Series was a low-floor ADA-compliant shuttle bus based on the International DuraStar cutaway cab.; In early 2014, IC Bus removed the LC-Series product literature from its website; its production status is unknown.
HC Series	2006–2017	Commercial bus; Limo bus; Tour bus	Navistar International: International 3200	The HC-Series is a high-floor shuttle bus based on the International DuraStar cutaway cab sold in various configurations.; The HC was also available in a parallel-drive hybrid model (MaxxForce DT)
TC Series	2019–present	Commercial bus; Limo bus; Tour bus	Navistar International: International MV	Replacing the HC, the TC is bodied by second-party manufacturers and is derived from the International MV (third-generation International NGV).

=== Company timeline ===
IC Bus timeline (2003–present)
	2000s							2010s										2020s
	'03	'04	'05	'06	'07	'08	'09	'10	'11	'12	'13	'14	'15	'16	'17	'18	'19	'20	'21	'22	'23	'24	'25	'26
Company name	IC Corporation							IC Bus
Bus type	IC Bus school buses
Type A									AE
Type B				BE
Type C	CE
Type D	FE
Type D	RE
Bus type	IC Bus commercial buses
Type A									AC
Type C					HC												TC
Type C					LC
Type D					FC
Type D					RC

== Prototype vehicles ==
=== Forward Advantage protoype ===
The IC FE Forward Advantage was a school bus prototype built by IC in 2008 as a testbed of a "flat-floor" design in the stepwell due to the compact design of the Caterpillar C7 engine. It also included some front-end styling modifications influenced by the severe-service line of International trucks. As Caterpillar has withdrawn from producing diesel engines for the school bus market, the Forward Advantage will not see production in its current form since its design was tailored to the Caterpillar engine.

=== Hybrid diesel-electric buses ===
IC offers hybrid diesel-electric powertrains in the CE conventional school bus as an option. The buses provide a claimed approximately 40% to 65% better fuel economy but cost about two and a half times more than a standard diesel bus ($210,000 versus $80,000).

Enova Systems entered into a long-term supply agreement with IC Bus that guarantees that Enova's proprietary Post Transmission Parallel Hybrid Electric drive system will be used in IC Bus' hybrid electric school buses. The hybrid school bus project features Enova's charge depleting (or "plug-in") or charge-sustaining systems. The drivetrain is powered by Valence Technology lithium ion phosphate battery modules. The braking system utilizes regenerative braking both as a means to reduce wear on the service brakes and to supply the batteries with extra power. As Enova went Bankrupt in 2014, IC Bus has discontinued the Hybrid option, once again leaving the CE with the Diesel Powertrain option.

=== Motorcoach prototypes ===
At the 2008 American Public Transportation Association Expo trade show, Navistar announced its intention to enter the intercity motorcoach segment by 2010, unveiling two prototypes produced by IC Bus. Using the MaxxForce 13 powerplant, IC Bus produced a 40-foot-long prototype alongside a 45-foot prototype. Using wind-tunnel design, the company predicted similar fuel efficiency gains that were seen with the streamlined International ProStar semitractor.

Following the two prototypes, IC Bus abandoned its efforts in the motorcoach segment, concentrating its commercial buses on school bus derivatives and the HC-Series (a cutaway variant of the International DuraStar).

== Assembly ==
All IC Corporation/IC Bus vehicles are produced in the Tulsa Bus Plant opened by AmTran in 2001. Prior to 2008, Type D models were produced in the Ward/AmTran Conway Bus Plant in Conway, Arkansas; this facility is now closed.

== See also ==
- AmTran - corporate predecessor
- Navistar International - parent company
