= Hackney Brothers Body Company =

American vehicle manufacturer

Hackney Brothers Body Company was an American vehicle manufacturer that produced vehicles from 1920 to 1996.

== History ==
In 1854, Hackney and Sons was organized by Willis N. Hackney, as a carriage shop in Wilson, North Carolina. In 1877, the company became known as Hackney Brothers, one of the largest manufacturers of buggies and wagons in the South. The present name, Hackney Brothers Body Company, was adopted in 1914, and formally incorporated in 1920. It was in these early years that the company pioneered the manufacture of school bus bodies and refrigerated bodies. The company was purchased in May 1996 by a holding company, Transportation Technologies, Inc. (TTI). The company was closed by the end of 1996 and operations were consolidated with another holding of TTI, Hackney & Sons, Inc., based in Washington, North Carolina, which was founded by a grandson of the founder of Hackney Brothers Body Company in 1946.

When the Hackney Brothers Body Company was dissolved in 1996, the company's records were given to Barton College, which is located in Wilson, North Carolina. Company presidents Thomas J. Hackney, Sr., and Thomas J. Hackney, Jr., were both chairmen of the Board of Trustees at Barton College during their various presidencies at Hackney Brothers Body Company.
