= Navistar DT engine =

Diesel engine

Overview
- Manufacturer: Navistar International
- Also called: Detroit Diesel Series 40
- Production: 1971–2016; 1971–2019 (Mexico)

Layout
- Configuration: Inline-6
- Displacement: 360 / 408 / 466 / 530 / 570 cu in (5.9 / 6.7 / 7.6 / 8.7 / 9.3 L)
- Cylinder bore: 4.59 inches
- Valvetrain: OHV, 2 or 4 valves per cylinder

Combustion
- Turbocharger: variable and fixed geometry turbocharged
- Fuel system: direct injection and HEUI (hydraulic electronic unit injection)
- Fuel type: Diesel

Output
- Power output: 170-350hp (commercial), 375hp military

The Navistar DT (Diesel Turbocharged or Diesel Turbo) engine family is a line of mid-range inline-6 turbo-diesel engines. With horsepower ratings ranging from 170 hp (130 kW) to 350 hp (260 kW), the Navistar DT engines are used primarily in medium-duty truck and bus applications such as school buses, although some versions have been developed for heavy-duty regional-haul and severe-service applications. Prior to 1986, Navistar International, then known as International Harvester Company, used the DT engine in farm and construction equipment. The DT466 was developed in the late 1960s and the production ran for more than four decades.

From 1997 to 2004, the DT was also rebadged and sold by Detroit Diesel as the Series 40.

== Design ==
The Navistar DT diesel engines are of a wet-sleeve design. This means that the cylinder wall (sleeve) is a separately machined part that fits into the cylinder bores cast into the engine block. The cylinder sleeve is in contact with the engine coolant, hence the "wet"-sleeve.

Navistar claims that the wet-sleeve design enhances durability because the consistent wall thickness of the sleeve allows for consistent heat transfer, ensuring the cylinders stay round during thermal expansion. Additionally, they state that the hardened cylinder sleeve is more durable and wear resistant than a softer, cast-in wall. Also, the replaceable cylinder sleeves protect the block from damage (e.g. in case of foreign objects entering the cylinder) and can easily be replaced, which Navistar claims enables simpler restoration to original specifications. The wet-sleeve design also allows the engine to be rebuilt easily to factory specifications, sometimes without even removing the engine from the vehicle.

This design is opposed to parent bore engines, where the cylinder walls are machined out of the bores cast into the block. International states that the uneven thickness of the cylinder walls causes the cylinders to become out of round during thermal expansion, increasing wear. Also, damage to the cylinder wall requires more extensive work to repair.

From 1984 until late 1995, the DT engines used a Bosch pump-line-nozzle (PLN) mechanical direct fuel injection system. 1984 through 1992 DTs used a Bosch MW style pump, while the 1993-1995s used a Bosch P style pump, and starting what was called New Generation Diesel engine design, which is still the same basic block design. Mechanical injection was still utilized in trucks up into the 1997 year, but this is rare. In 1994, due to tightening emissions regulations, the engines were redesigned to use electronically controlled unit direct fuel injection. From 1994 to 2004, the engines used HEUI (Hydraulically actuated Electronically controlled Unit Injection) injectors, co-developed by Navistar and Caterpillar Inc. From 2004 to 2009, the engines use International's Electro-Hydraulic Generation Two (G2) unit injectors.

== MaxxForce variants ==
From the time the United States Environmental Protection Agency's 2007 emissions regulations went into effect, the Navistar DT engines were available in three configurations in what turned out to be their final generation prior to discontinuation. These variants were renamed to conform to International's then-new MaxxForce engine brand.

- MaxxForce DT: 7.6 L (466 cu in) displacement, bore x stroke 4.59 in × 4.68 in (117 mm × 119 mm); with horsepower ratings from 210–300 hp (160–220 kW). The MaxxForce DT was available in standard and high torque configurations.
- MaxxForce 9: Enlarged variant of the MaxxForce DT, featuring a 9.3 L (570 cu in) displacement, bore x stroke 4.59 in × 5.75 in (117 mm × 146 mm); with horsepower ranging from 300–330 hp (220–250 kW).
- MaxxForce 10: Same displacement as MaxxForce 9, with horsepower ranging from 310–350 hp (230–260 kW). This engine featured stronger components, such as steel-crowned two-piece pistons, strengthened engine block, and a titanium turbocharger turbine to cope with the extra power and stress of severe-service and heavy-duty applications.

The engines were also available for defense applications under the MaxxForce D brand. The final generation MaxxForce DT was known as the MaxxForce D7.6I6, and the MaxxForce 10 was known as the MaxxForce D9.3I6. Modifications from the civilian versions included diamond-coated (metal nitride coating) injectors to enable the engines to run on JP-8 fuel.

== Electronic injection variants ==
Navistar DT466E

Overview
- Manufacturer: Navistar International
- Production: 1994-2004

Layout
- Configuration: Inline-6 wet-sleeved
- Displacement: 466 cu in (7.6 L)
- Cylinder bore: 4.59 in (116.6 mm)
- Piston stroke: 4.68 in (118.9 mm)
- Cylinder block material: Cast iron
- Cylinder head material: Cast iron
- Valvetrain: OHV 4 valves per cylinder

Combustion
- Turbocharger: turbocharged
- Fuel system: HEUI (hydraulic electronic unit injection)
- Fuel type: Diesel

Dimensions
- Dry weight: 1,425 lbs dry

Chronology
- Predecessor: DT466
- Successor: MaxxForce DT

- DT 530E 530ST (8.7L): available in standard and high-torque configurations. Replaced in 2004 by DT/HT 570, which were replaced in 2007 by the MaxxForce 9 and 10, respectively. Used electro-hydraulic unit injection.
- DT 466E (7.6L): Introduced in 1994, added electronic control to previous, non-electronic DT 466, superseded by model year 2005-and-later DT 466 with variable geometry turbocharger (see below). Also changed over from mechanical fuel injection to electro-hydraulic unit injection (HEUI).

== Mechanical injection variants ==
- DT 466 Family, Model A175 and A190.
- DT 408 (6.7L): a smaller version of the DT family.
- DT 360 (5.9L): 6-cylinder mechanical injection produced from 1987 to 1994
- DTA 360: Same as above, but with an aftercooler, the "A" stands for "aftercooled".
- DTA 466: Same as earlier mechanical-injection DT 466, but with an aftercooler.

Other Variants:

- Turbo 400 engine: version used in IH farm and construction equipment, with many different sizes.

== Update history ==
In 2004, the entire DT family of engines was updated to meet 2004 emissions standards set out by the United States Environmental Protection Agency. Changes to the engines included a new turbocharger (called EVRT, for "Electronic Variable Response Turbocharger") with movable turbo vanes to improve boost and reduce lag, a new, electronically controlled hydraulic unit fuel injection system, Exhaust Gas Recirculation with heat exchanger to compensate for improved thermal efficiency, and new four-valve cylinder heads.

In 2007, the DT engines were updated once again to comply with stricter 2007 emissions standards. The DT 466, DT 570, and HT 570 engines were renamed MaxxForce DT, MaxxForce 9, and MaxxForce 10, respectively. Among the new features were closed-crankcase ventilation and new wiring harnesses. The MaxxForce engines were first available in the 2008 model year of International trucks and IC Corporation school buses.

In 2010 the DT engines were updated once again for compliance with 2010 emissions standards. They all received new, twin turbochargers, with higher-rated versions of the MaxxForce DT and all MaxxForce 9 and 10 engines receiving intercooling and aftercooling. Upgrades to fuel injectors, the EGR system, and cooling were also part of the 2010 modifications.

2015 was the final production year for the MaxxForce DT. It was discontinued for 2015, with some buses being built as 2016 models. It continued in the RE for the 2016 model. It was announced on July 22, 2016, that the RE will be produced with the Cummins ISL9 and the DT offering was going away completely.

== Applications ==
- International S series (DT 466)
- International CXT (DT 466/MaxxForce DT)
- International 8500 (HT 570)
- International 7300, 7400, 7500 (DT 466, DT 570, HT 570)
- 4300, 4400 (DT 466/MaxxForce DT, DT 570/MaxxForce 9)
- International MaxxPro
- International 3300, 3800, 3900 bus chassis
- AmTran Corporation Genesis (1992–2002) (DT 360/DT466/DT466E)
- AmTran Corporation Volunteer/Conventional (DT 360/DT466/DT466E)
- IC Corporation FE 300 (DT 466/MaxxForce DT)
- IC Corporation RE 300 (DT 466/MaxxForce DT, DT 570/MaxxForce 9) [MaxxForce DT discontinued]
- IC Corporation CE 300 (DT 466/MaxxForce DT) [MaxxForce DT discontinued]

== See also ==
- Navistar VT engine
- Navistar T444E engine
- Navistar International
- List of International Harvester/Navistar engines
