= AmTran =

Defunct American school bus manufacturer

American Transportation Corporation
- Type: Subsidiary
- Industry: Transportation
- Predecessor: Ward Industries, Inc.
- Founded: 1980; 46 years ago
- Defunct: 2002
- Fate: Renamed IC Corporation in 2002
- Successor: IC Corporation
- Headquarters: Conway, Arkansas, U.S.
- Number of locations: 2 (Conway, Arkansas and Tulsa, Oklahoma)
- Area served: United States
- Key people: Tom Cellitti, Vice President and General Manager
- Products: School Buses; Commercial Buses
- Parent: Navistar International (1991–2002)
- Website: www.navistar.com (archived)

American Transportation Corporation (better known as AmTran) was an American bus manufacturer. Headquartered in Conway, Arkansas, AmTran specialized in yellow school buses, alongside buses for other uses. Tracing its roots to Ward Body Works (established in 1933), The company was formed in 1980 following the bankruptcy of Ward to continue bus production.

In 1991, the company became a subsidiary of Navistar International, leading to a series of acquisitions of school bus body manufacturers by chassis suppliers during the 1990s. In 2000, Navistar rebranded AmTran by introducing the International IC, with other vehicles taking on International branding later. In 2002, the "AmTran" brand name was retired, as the name was changed to IC Corporation (IC Bus since 2009).

As with its predecessor company, AmTran corporate headquarters and manufacturing facilities were located in Conway, Arkansas. In 2001, the company opened another manufacturing facility in Tulsa, Oklahoma (where IC Bus currently assembles vehicles).

== History ==
During the late 1970s, the school bus manufacturing industry was in relative turmoil. From the early 1950s, the segment was dependent on student population growth related to the baby-boom generation. By the beginning of the 1980s, the last of the generation had completed their secondary education, leading to a decrease in student population growth across the United States.

At the time, Ward Body Works was among "the Big Six" full-line school bus manufacturers (alongside Blue Bird, Carpenter, Superior, Thomas, and Wayne). The declining economy of the late 1970s also cut into the profitability of all school bus manufacturers. Of the "Big Six", Superior and Ward were the hardest hit. Following the 1975 closure of its secondary manufacturing facility in Pennsylvania, Ward amassed over $20 million in debt by 1979.

=== Reorganization of Ward Industries (1980–1991) ===
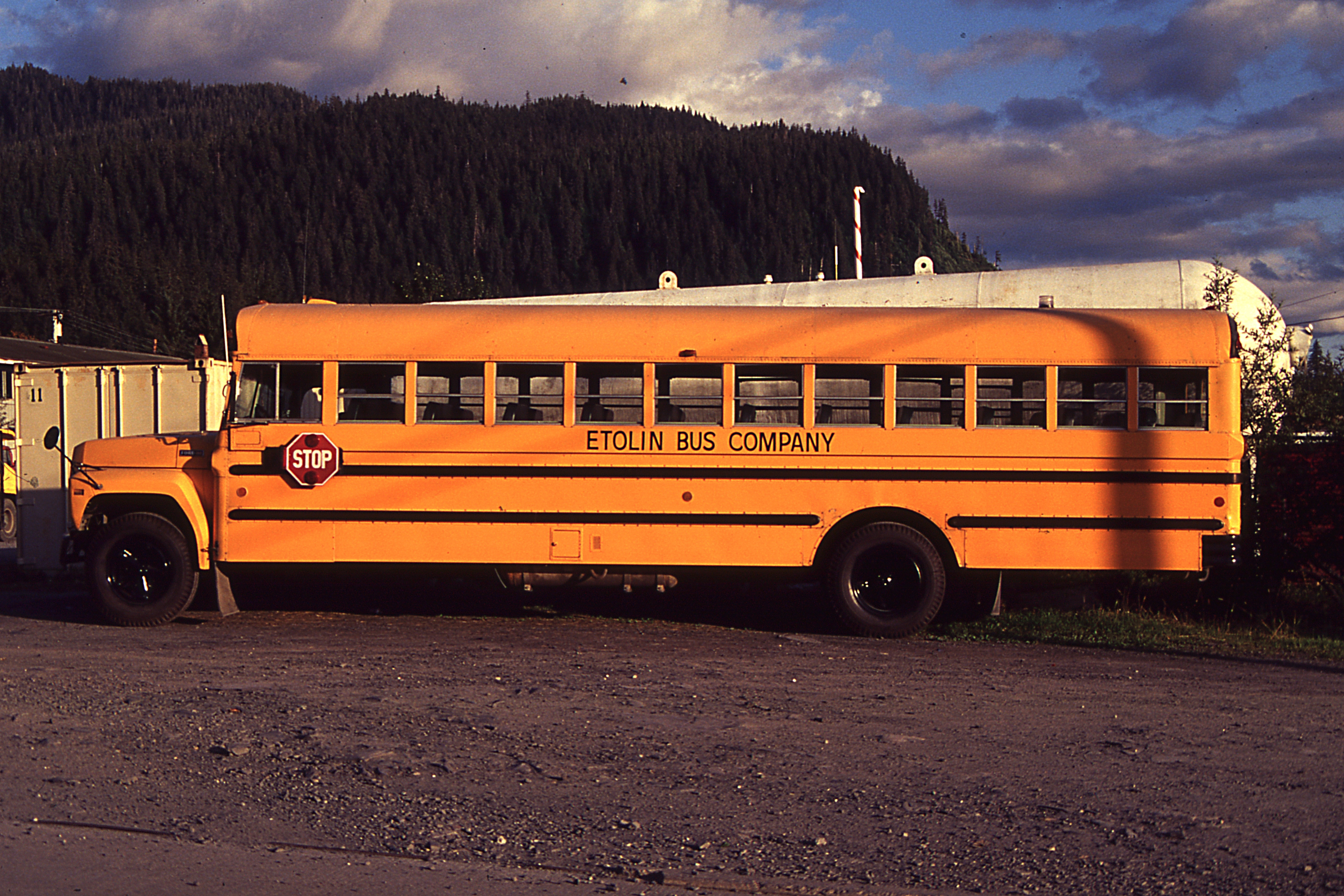
Early 1980s Ward Volunteer in Alaska

On July 25, 1980, Ward Industries filed for Chapter 11 bankruptcy. In the filing, the family-owned company declared $21.5 million in liabilities. As Ward Industries was a significant manufacturer in the central Arkansas region, the Wards sought for a way to keep the doors of the company open.

With company president Charles Ward selling off his stake in the company, Ward Industries was acquired by an investment group (assisted by then-Arkansas Governor Bill Clinton) named MBH, Inc. MBH was an acronym for the first letters of the last names of each of the 4 investors: Thomas E "Mack" McLarty, J.W. "Buddy" Benafield and two Kansas City brothers, Richard L. "Dick" Harmon and Robert Harmon. McLarty and Benafield each held one-third ownership; the Harmon brothers together held the remaining one-third ownership. MBH reopened Ward Industries as American Transportation Corporation (AmTran). As Ward Industries continued to hold significant market share in the school bus segment, AmTran chose to retain the Ward brand name for school buses although non-school bus products adopted the AmTran brand in 1981.

Following the acquisition, the Ward family held no stake in AmTran; however, Steve Ward remained in the new company for vehicle distribution and marketing, having the exclusive rights to sell Ward/AmTran products in Arkansas, based in a dealership from Conway.

During the 1980s, AmTran would make several product introductions that would advance school bus design in several market segments. Although among the last large bus manufacturers to introduce a Type A school bus, AmTran was the first manufacturer to introduce a higher-capacity version, with five rows of seating instead of four seen at the time. For 1983, AmTran introduced the first large semi-forward control conventional with the introduction of the Ward/AmTran Patriot. Using a shortened version of the Chevrolet/GMC B-Series, the Patriot allowed for a shorter wheelbase and nose angle for improved forward visibility. Although not a success overall, the Patriot would go on to become a major influence on the later Thomas Vista.

In 1987, the structure of the Ward/AmTran body underwent an exterior update, distinguished by a rubrail mounted below the window line. Much of the body structure remains in use in current-production IC Bus CE and RE-series product lines.

=== Acquisition by Navistar (1991–1999) ===
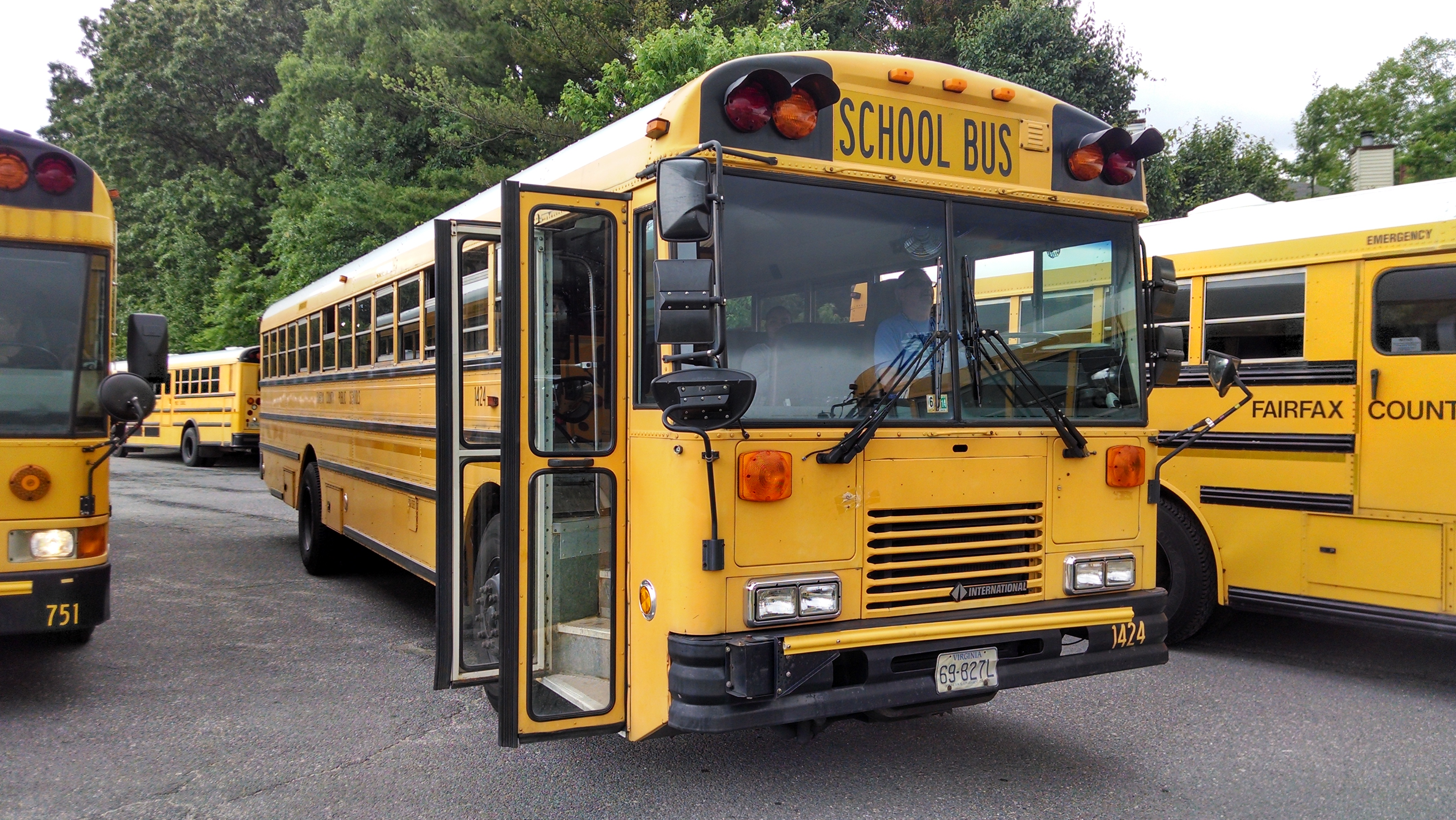
1996 AmTran Genesis, now retired (Fairfax County, Virginia)

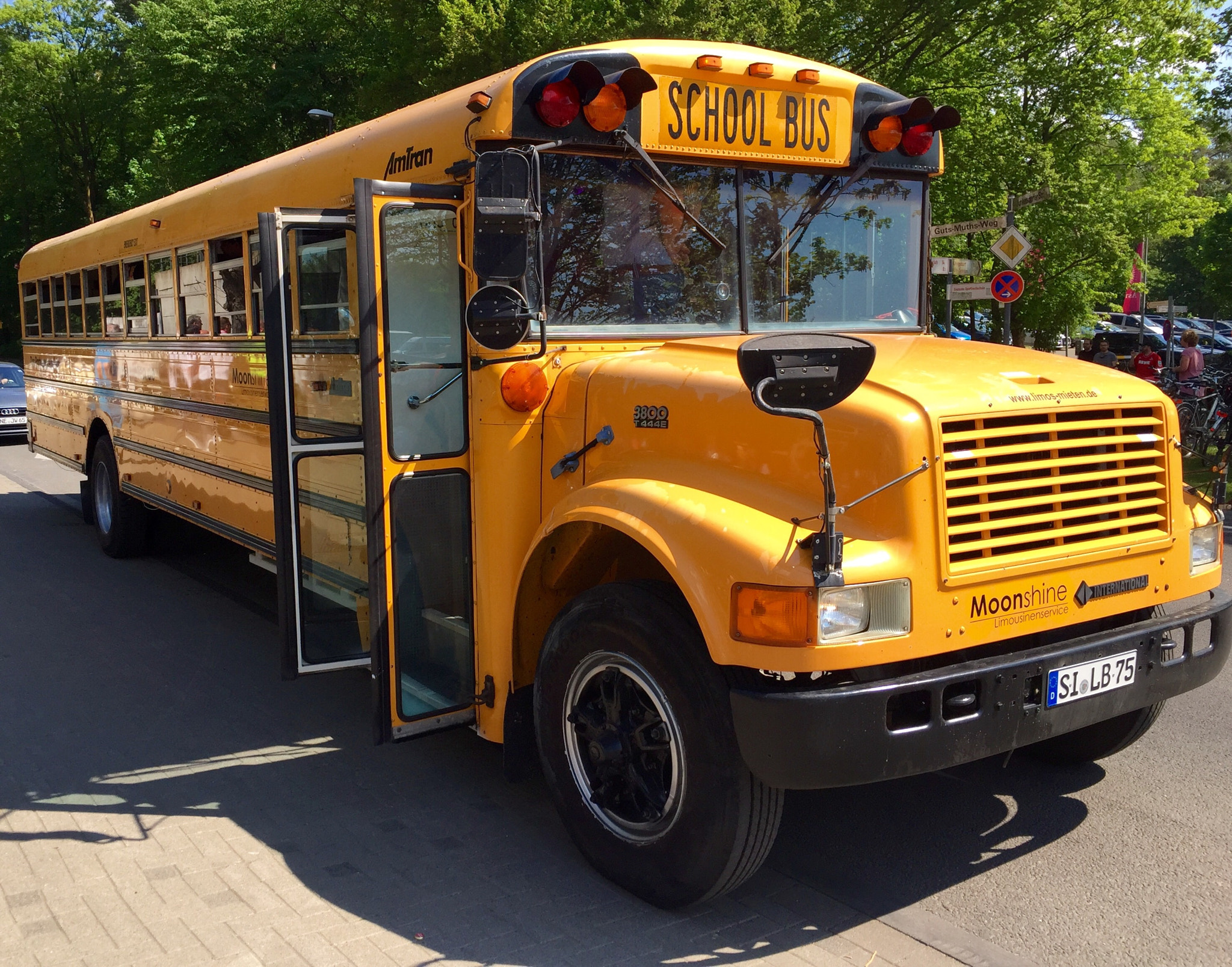
1997–1999 AmTran CS (retired)

In 1991, Navistar International acquired one-third of the stock of American Transportation Corporation; the purchase was initiated by Jerry Williams, the CEO of AmTran at the time. As part of the purchase, Navistar acquired an option to buy the rest of AmTran, which was completed in April 1995. The AmTran purchase marked the first purchase of a school bus body manufacturer by a chassis manufacturer or supplier, as several more were acquired during the late 1990s.

Although AmTran had legally existed since 1981 and its non-school bus vehicles were branded as such, the company began to phase out the Ward brand following the Navistar purchase. During 1992, the Ward Senator front-engine bus was updated, becoming the AmTran Genesis (with a Genesis by AmTran roof emblem). At the end of 1992, the AmTran brand was phased in on other Ward school buses. Navistar ownership also affected availability of school bus chassis; after 1991, the Volunteer body was produced nearly exclusively on the International 3800 chassis (Ford chassis remained a rarely ordered option through its 1998 discontinuation).

For 1996 production, AmTran introduced its first all-new full-size bus, the AmTran RE. The first rear-engine bus produced by AmTran or Ward in over 20 years, the RE broke from industry precedent in not sharing a common body design with the front-engine Genesis. To focus on full-size buses exclusively, AmTran ended production of the Vanguard cutaway-chassis bus after 1996.

For 1997, AmTran released the AmTran CS, the most extensive update to the Volunteer conventional since 1973. The drivers' compartment was redesigned with updated controls and the flat windshield was replaced by a 4-piece design to improve forward visibility. Following the discontinuation of the Ford B700/B800 after 1998, the International 3800 became the sole chassis for the AmTran CS, as the Freightliner FS-65 chassis was produced by the parent company of competitor Thomas Built Buses. In 1999, AmTran redesigned its front-engine transit-style bus as the AmTran FE.

=== Introduction of the International IC and rebranding (1999–2002) ===
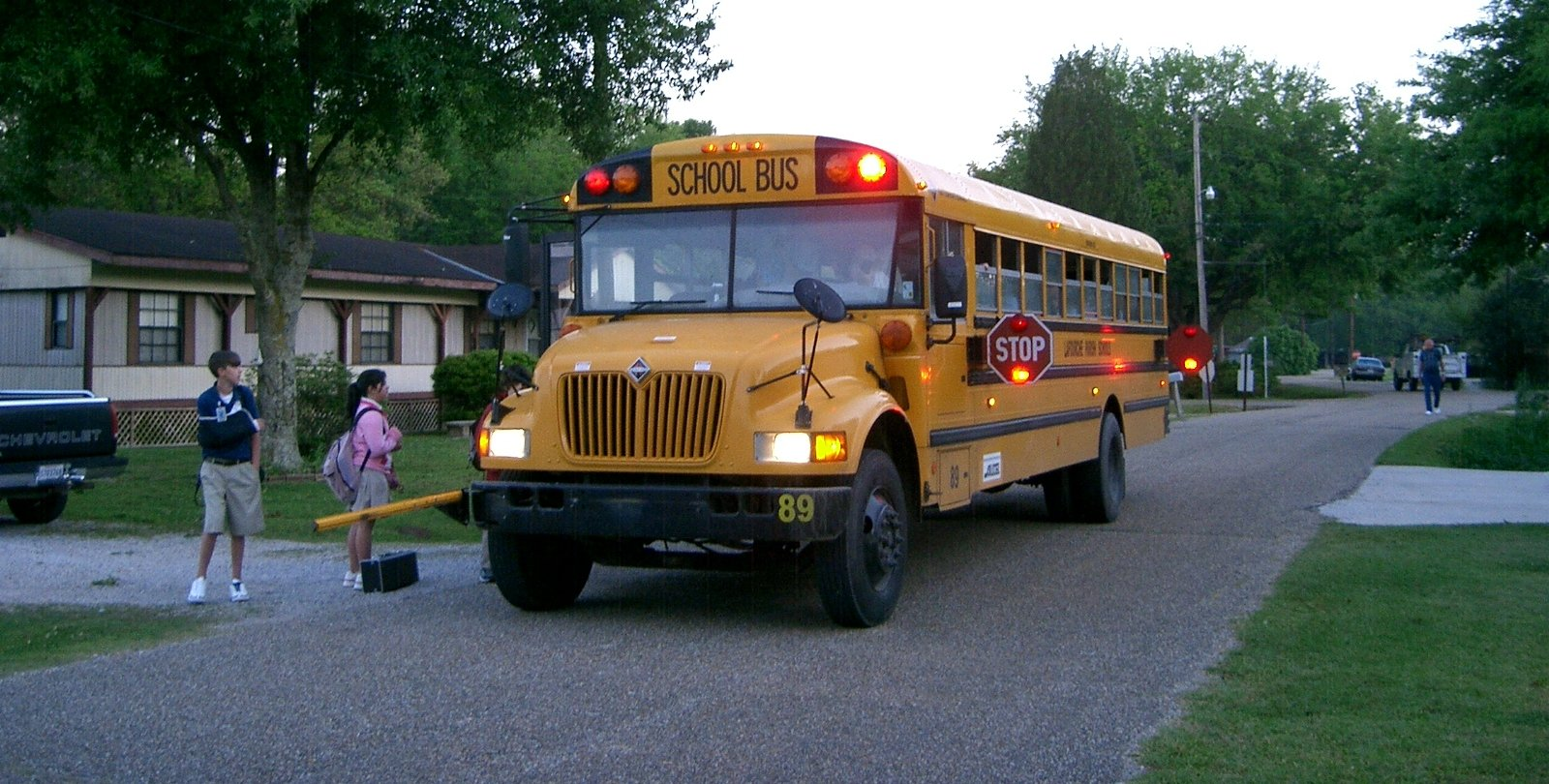
2002 International IC (AmTran) in Thibodaux, Louisiana

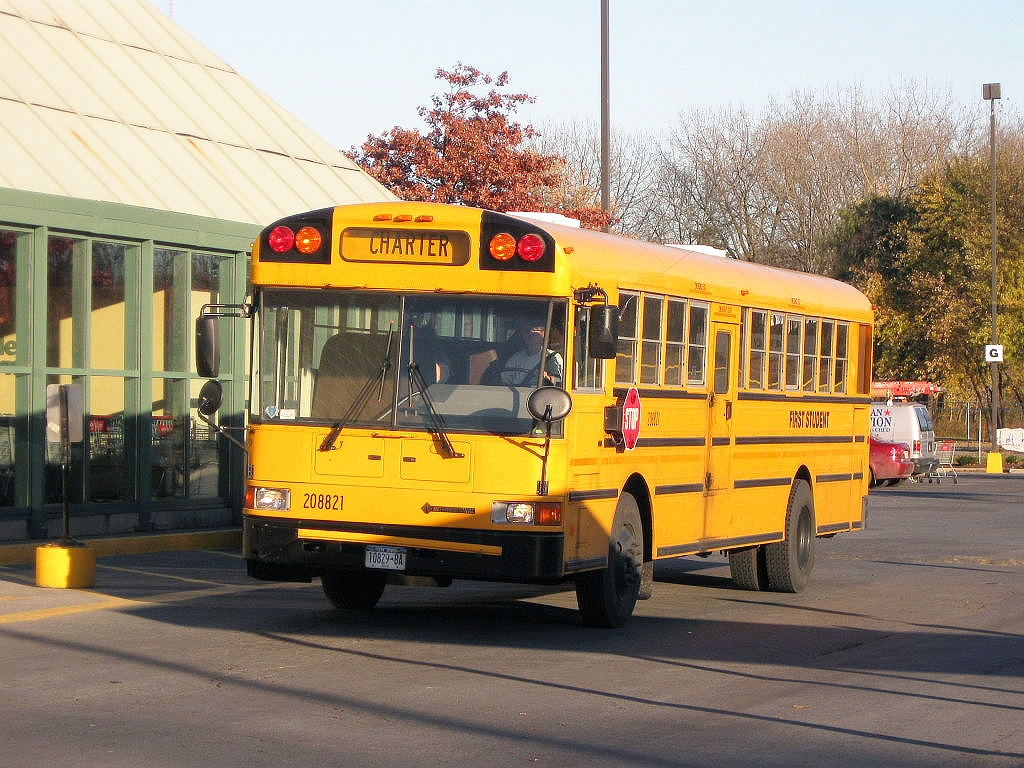
2000 AmTran RE operated by First Student

In late 1999, AmTran announced plans to build a second manufacturing facility in Tulsa, Oklahoma. Dedicated to production of conventional-chassis school buses, the Tulsa factory was planned to employ nearly 1,200 people as the factory opened in 2001. Though still headquartered in Conway, the factory was now rededicated towards the lower-volume AmTran FE and RE product lines.

Following the introduction of Tulsa-produced buses, Navistar (at the time, International Truck and Engine) introduced the International IC for 2001. Branded as a fully integrated conventional (pairing an International-sourced chassis, powertrain, and body), the IC underwent several design updates. Compared to its AmTran CS predecessor, the IC saw a slightly redesigned windshield and another redesign of the drivers' compartment. While sharing the International 3800 chassis with other body manufacturers, the IC body was further distinguished by a model-exclusive hood (receiving a vertical-slatted grille).

The IC was sold alongside with the existing AmTran-branded CS into 2002 production. Also for the 2001 model year, the FE and RE adopted the identification of the International IC, replacing AmTran roof badging with "International" badging (with or without the International diamond emblem). In 2002, the company retired the "AmTran" brand name, and renamed its bus manufacturing subsidiary from American Transportation Corporation to IC Corporation (Integrated Coach Corporation, IC Bus since 2009).

== Products ==
Ward/AmTran product line (1980–1992)
Model name	Production	Vehicle type	Chassis	Notes
Vanguard	1982–1992	Type A (cutaway): dual rear wheel	Ford Motor Company: Ford Econoline 350; General Motors: Chevrolet van/GMC Vandura	The Ward Vanguard was the first Type A school bus produced with a 25-passenger body, the largest at the time.; Introduced in late 1981 and was only produced with dual rear wheels.
Volunteer	1980–1992	Type C (conventional)	Ford Motor Company: Ford B700/B800/B8000; General Motors: Chevrolet B6/GMC B6000 (1980–1991); International Harvester; Navistar International: International S1700/S1800 (1980–1989); International 3700/3800 (1989–1992)	Introduced in 1973, the Ward Volunteer body underwent several body modifications during the 1980s; much of the underlying body structure is still used in the current IC CE of today.; General Motors chassis dropped after 1991.
Patriot	1982–1991	Type C (conventional): semi-forward control	General Motors: Chevrolet/GMC B6 (modified)	The Ward Patriot was a semi-forward control conventional based on a modified General Motors B6 chassis; it is similar in layout to the 1989-1990 Thomas Vista school bus.; Discontinued after the 1991 General Motors exit from large-scale conventional chassis production.
President	1980–1989	Type D (transit-style): front engine	Asia-Smith Motors (1988–1990) General Motors: Chevrolet/GMC S-7 (1987–1989); International Harvester; Navistar International: International 1853FC (1980–1986)	Introduced in the mid-1970s, the Ward President is a front-engine transit-style school bus similar to the Blue Bird All American and Thomas Saf-T-Liner EF. Several front-wheel drive prototypes were produced in 1976.; From 1987 to 1990, the President shared its chassis with the Wayne Lifestar school bus.
Senator	1989–1992	Type D (transit-style): front engine	Navistar International: International 3900	Introduced as the replacement for the Ward President, the Ward Senator is a front-engine transit school bus similar to the Blue Bird TC/2000 and Thomas Saf-T-Liner MVP EF. Several prototypes were produced on Crane Carrier Corporation chassis in 1990.; In 1992, the Senator was re-branded as the AmTran Genesis.

AmTran product line (1992–2002)
Model name	Production	Vehicle type	Chassis	Notes
Vanguard	1993–1996	Type A (cutaway): dual rear wheel	General Motors: Chevrolet van/GMC Vandura	Discontinued after 1996 as AmTran concentrated on full-size bus production; only Type A school bus produced until the 2010-2014 IC AE-Series.
Volunteer/CS	1993–1996 (Volunteer); 1997–2002 (CS)	Type C (conventional)	Ford Motor Company: Ford B700/B800 (1993–1998); Navistar International: International 3800 (1993–2002)	The Volunteer was replaced in 1997 by the CS, which was given a new windshield and driver's compartment.; Following the discontinuation of the Ford B-Series in 1998, all AmTran chassis production was sourced from parent company Navistar.
IC	2000–2002	Type C (conventional)	Navistar International: International 3800	The International IC was introduced for the 2001 model year with another interior redesign and a separate hood design from other International 3800-chassis buses.; As for the IC Corporation CE Series, this remains in production (as of 2026).
Genesis/FE	1992–2002	Type D (transit-style): front engine	Navistar International: International 3900	An updated and rebranded version of the Ward Senator, the Genesis was the first school bus to use AmTran badging; the Genesis roof badging was replaced by AmTran lettering in 1995.; As part of a second update, the Genesis was renamed as the AmTran FE in 1999, later becoming as the IC Corporation FE Series in 2002; it was produced until it was discontinued in 2010.
RE3000	1996–2002	Type D (transit-style): rear engine	Navistar International: International 3000	Introduced in 1996 as a rear-engine competitor to the Blue Bird TC/2000 and Thomas Saf-T-Liner MVP.; In 2000, an update was made to the drivers' compartment and controls.; As the IC Corporation RE Series, this was discontinued in 2024.

=== Company timeline ===
American Transportation Corporation timeline (1981–2002)
	1980s									1990s										2000s
	'81	'82	'83	'84	'85	'86	'87	'88	'89	'90	'91	'92	'93	'94	'95	'96	'97	'98	'99	'00	'01	'02
Brand name	Ward/AmTran												AmTran								International
Bus type	AmTran school buses
Type A			Vanguard
Type C	Volunteer																CS
Type C			Patriot																		IC
Type D	President									Senator			Genesis							FE
Type D																	RE

== Facilities ==
AmTran buses were produced in the former Ward factory in Conway, Arkansas. In December 1999, Navistar announced a $45 million plan to open a second AmTran school bus manufacturing plant in Tulsa, Oklahoma. The facility took over a former aircraft plant near the Tulsa International Airport, creating approximately 500 jobs. Coinciding with the 2000 introduction of the IC, the Tulsa facility became home to all conventional-style bus bodies. The Conway factory remained in production, manufacturing the FE and RE-Series transit-style bus bodies.

After AmTran became IC Corporation (now IC Bus), the Conway facility ended full-scale bus production in January 2010 (following the discontinuation of the FE-Series); originally repurposed for parts fabrication and production, the factory was sold off by Navistar in 2014.

== See also ==
- IC Bus - successor of AmTran
- Navistar International - parent company
