= Navistar VT engine =

Navistar VT Engine
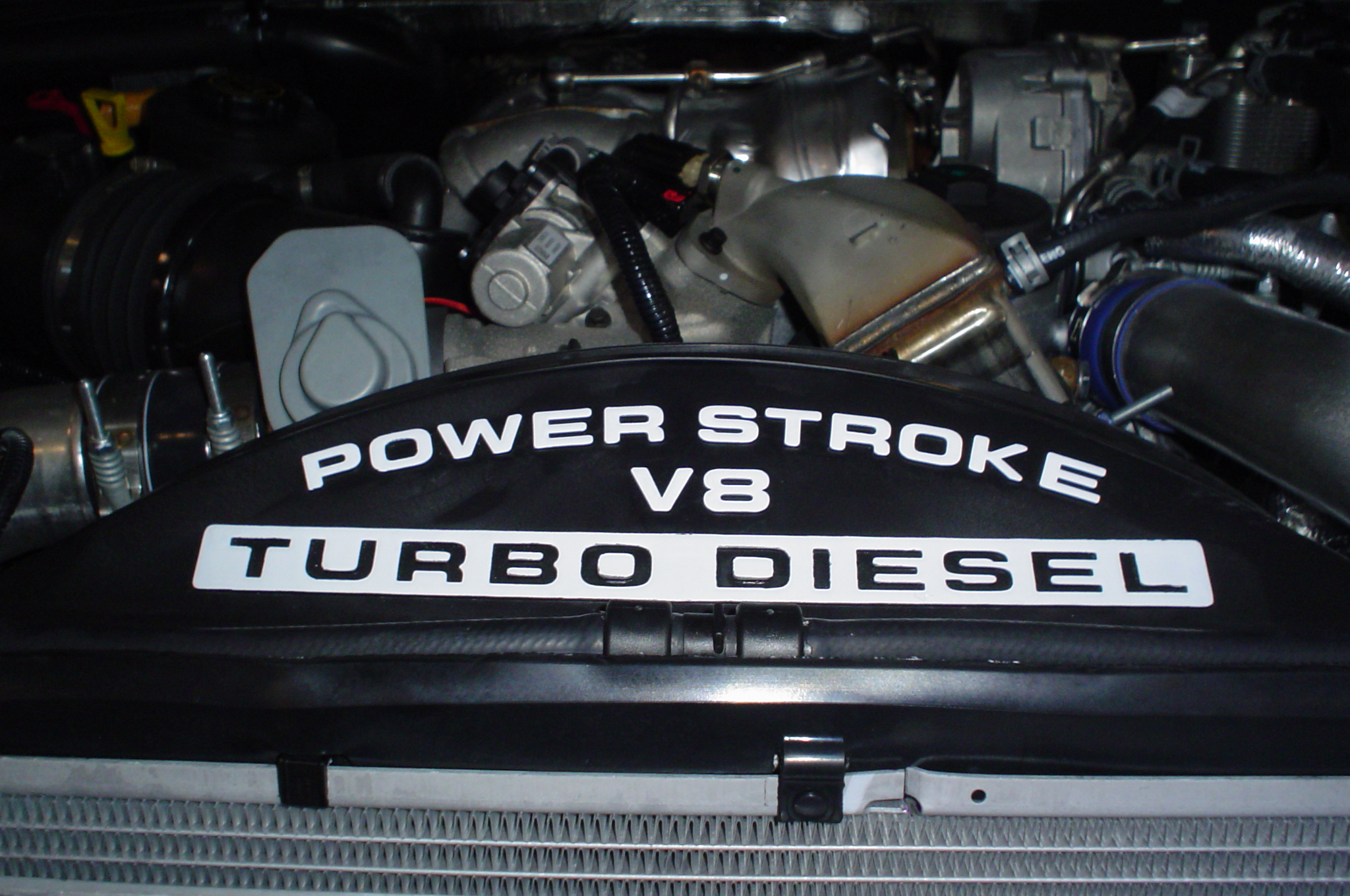
- 6.4 L Powerstroke as seen in a Ford Super Duty

Overview
- Manufacturer: International Truck and Engine Corp., a Division of Navistar International Corporation
- Also called: Power Stroke, MaxxForce 7
- Production: 2003–2016

Layout
- Configuration: 90° V8, V6
- Displacement: 272 cu in (4.5 L); 363 cu in (5.9 L); 389 cu in (6.4 L)
- Cylinder bore: 95 mm (3.74 in); 98.2 mm (3.87 in)
- Piston stroke: 105 mm (4.13 in)
- Cylinder block material: Cast iron (VT365); Compacted graphite iron (MaxxForce 7)
- Valvetrain: OHV 4 valves x cylinder

Combustion
- Turbocharger: Variable-geometry; Sequential twin-turbo Series Sequential; Dual compound
- Fuel system: HEUI, common rail direct injection
- Fuel type: Diesel
- Cooling system: Water-cooled

Output
- Power output: 200–350 hp (149–261 kW)
- Torque output: 440–660 lb⋅ft (597–895 N⋅m)

Emissions
- Emissions target standard: 2007 EPA

Chronology
- Predecessor: International T444E

The Navistar VT engine family is a line of diesel engines that was produced by International Truck and Engine (Navistar International) from 2003 to 2016. Developed as the replacement for the T444E V8, the VT V6 and V8 diesels were the smallest diesel engines used in Navistar vehicles, slotted below the DT inline-6 engine family. Sharing many applications with the DT466 inline-6, the VT engines were used in medium-duty trucks and school bus chassis, competing against the Cummins B-series and the Mercedes-Benz MBE900 diesel engines. In 2007, both the VT and DT engines were rebranded under the MaxxForce brand name, with model designations related to their displacement.

From 2003 to 2010, VT engines were used by Ford Motor Company in several vehicles, sold as the second and third generations of the Ford Power Stroke diesel engine family. The Ford E-Series continued to use the VT365 until the end of 2010. For 2011 production, the Power Stroke diesel shifted to a Ford-produced design.

After 2016, Navistar ended production of both VT and DT-derived MaxxForce diesel engines, making the VT the final V-configuration engine produced by International. In medium-duty vehicles, the Cummins ISB6.7 diesel served as its replacement.

== Variants ==
=== VT365 ===
The VT365, also known as the 6.0 L PowerStroke in 2003-2007 model year Ford Super Duty trucks and 2003-2010 model year Ford E-Series vans/chassis cabs, is a 32-valve pushrod V8. Bore and stroke is 95 mm × 105 mm (3.74 in × 4.13 in). Output was 325 hp (242 kW) at 3300 rpm and 560 lb⋅ft (759 N⋅m) at 2000 rpm, but as of 2005 that was increased to 570 lb⋅ft (773 N⋅m) at 2000 rpm. It also uses a 2nd generation (G-2) HEUI (Hydraulic-Electronic Unit injector) direct injection fuel system, as well as a variable-geometry turbocharger, which is designed to reduce turbo lag and create better throttle response.

An optional TorqShift 5-speed automatic transmission is available for Ford trucks. This special transmission gives improved performance to the engine and features a tow/haul mode to replace the "Overdrive Off" function on the previous 4-speed automatic.

=== VT275 ===
A variant of the VT365 is the VT275 4.5 L V-6, which is basically a 6.0 L V-8 with two fewer cylinders. However, it uses a sequential twin-turbocharger system, instead of the single variable-geometry turbocharger used in the VT365. The crankshaft utilizes a 30° split-pin design to create even 120° firing intervals. In addition, a counter rotating balancer shaft which runs through the hollow camshaft within the vee of the engine is used to compensate for first order moments of inertia inherent to the 90° V6 configuration. It is used in the 2006 Ford LCF (Low Cab Forward) and International CF (Cab Forward) (later CityStar) series trucks. It produces 200 hp (149 kW) and 440 lb⋅ft (597 N⋅m) of torque and is backed by a Ford TorqShift 5 speed automatic.

For the 2007 model year, the VT275 was brought up to 2007 EPA emission standards and renamed the MaxxForce 5.

It has since been discontinued for the 2010 model year.

=== MaxxForce 7 ===
The MaxxForce 7, also known as the 6.4 L PowerStroke in 2008-2010 model year Ford Super Duty trucks, is a 6.4 L turbo-diesel V8 engine. The engine has a sequential turbocharger system, utilizing a high pressure and low pressure turbo, with only the high pressure turbo being a VGT (variable geometry turbo). The engine also uses a high pressure common rail fuel injection system. It produces 350 hp (261 kW) at 3000 rpm and 650 lb⋅ft (881 N⋅m) of torque at 2000 rpm in Ford truck applications.

This engine is also used in International trucks and buses. However, the EPA2007 MaxxForce 7 does not use the compound turbocharger system; rather, it uses a single stage variable vane turbocharger. Displacement and injector systems are the same as the Ford branded Power Stroke. In MaxxForce 7 guise, the engine produces between 200–230 hp (149–172 kW) and 580–620 lb⋅ft (786–841 N⋅m) of torque.

For the 2010 model year, Navistar upgraded the MaxxForce 7 with dual compound turbochargers, giving it a new power range at 220–300 hp (164–224 kW) at 2600 rpm and 520–660 lb⋅ft (705–895 N⋅m) of torque at 1600–2200 rpm. The cylinder block has also been updated using compacted graphite iron (CGI) material to increase strength and reduce weight.

== Applications ==
- Ford E-Series (2003-2010)
- Ford Excursion (2003-2005)
- Ford Super Duty (2003-2010)
- Ford F-650/F-750 (2004-2008)
- International 3000 (rear-engine bus)
- International Citystar/Ford LCF
- International Durastar/4200
  - International 3300 (cowled bus)
- International MXT
- International MXT-MV
- International Terrastar

== See also ==
- Ford Power Stroke engine
- List of Ford engines
- List of Navistar engines
