= International 3300 =

Motor vehicle

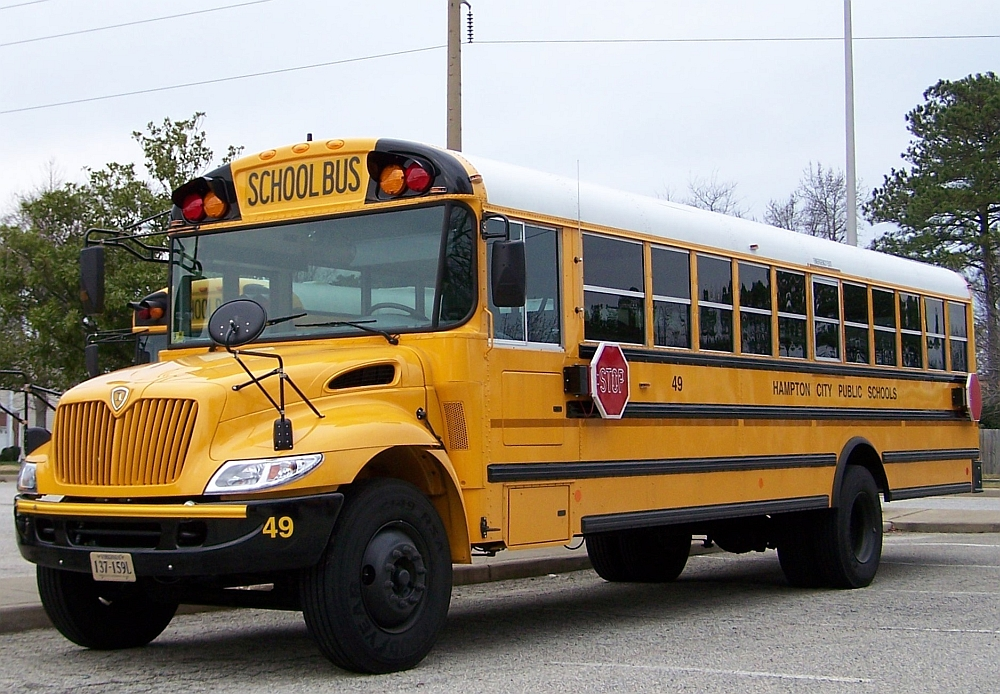
- IC CE-Series

Overview
- Manufacturer: Navistar International
- Production: 2004–2023

Body and chassis
- Class: Type C
- Layout: conventional 4x2
- Body styles: Cowled chassis: school bus; commercial bus
- Related: International DuraStar; International 3200

Powertrain
- Engines: Navistar VT365 V8; Navistar MaxxForce 7 V8; Navistar DT466/MaxxForce DT I6; Cummins ISB6.7 I6; PSI 8.8L LPG/Gasoline V8

Chronology
- Predecessor: International 3800
- Successor: International MV (bus chassis)

The International 3300 is a Type-C (conventional-style) cowled bus chassis manufactured by Navistar International from the 2005 to the 2024 model years, derived from the International DuraStar for the United States, Canada, and Mexico. While most examples were produced as yellow school buses, variants of the 3300 were also produced for commercial applications; International also produced a cutaway-cab variant of the model line.

Developed as the successor to the International 3800 (the final model line of the International S series), the 3300 is a derivative of the International 4300 medium-duty truck (later renamed the DuraStar, succeeded by the International MV in 2019). The 3300 was produced from 2004 until 2023, when it was replaced by the cowled bus chassis version of the MV.

== Design overview ==
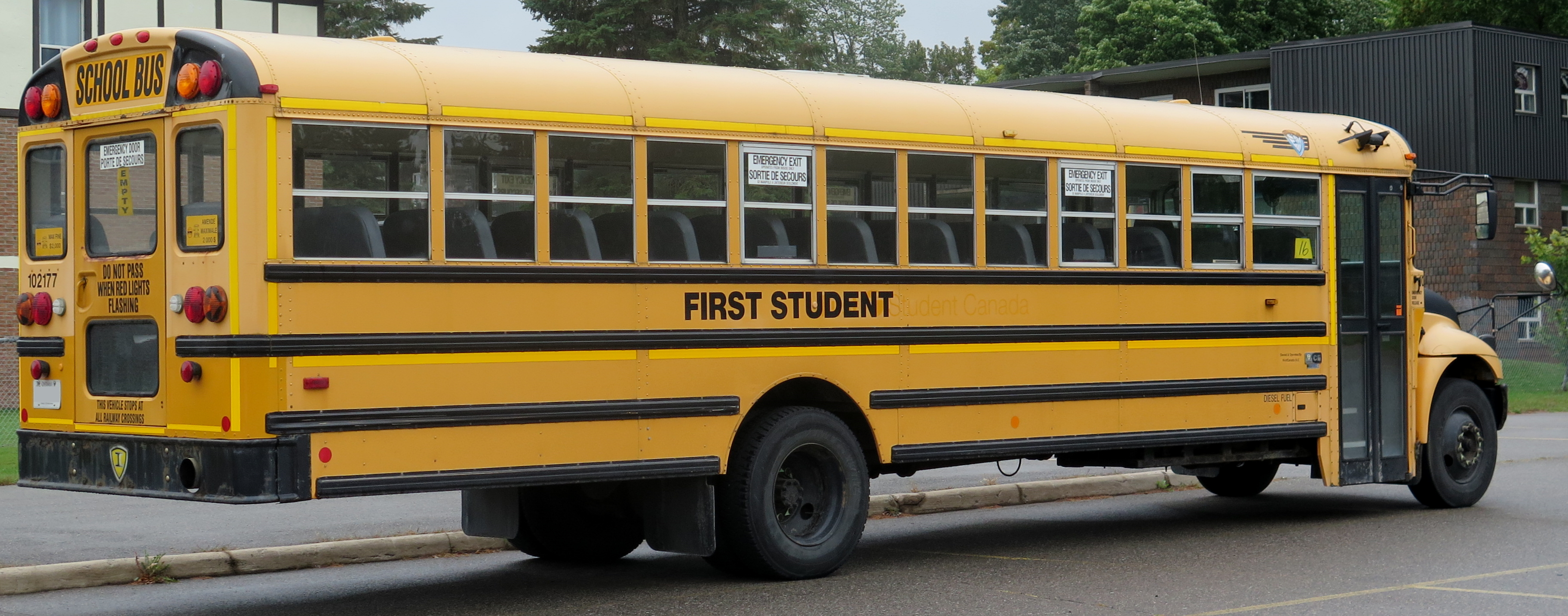
2010 IC CE, rear view

In 2001, International introduced the NGV (Next Generation Vehicle) line of trucks, with an all-new 4000-series medium-duty truck line. For the 2005 model year, the 3300 was introduced as the replacement for the International 3800 (the final model of the long-running International S-Series). The 3300 shares its powertrain and forward body components with the 4300 medium-duty truck (the replacement for the 4900).

Though remaining under the same model nomenclature since 2004, the 3300 has followed the model development of the International DuraStar.

=== Body manufacturers ===
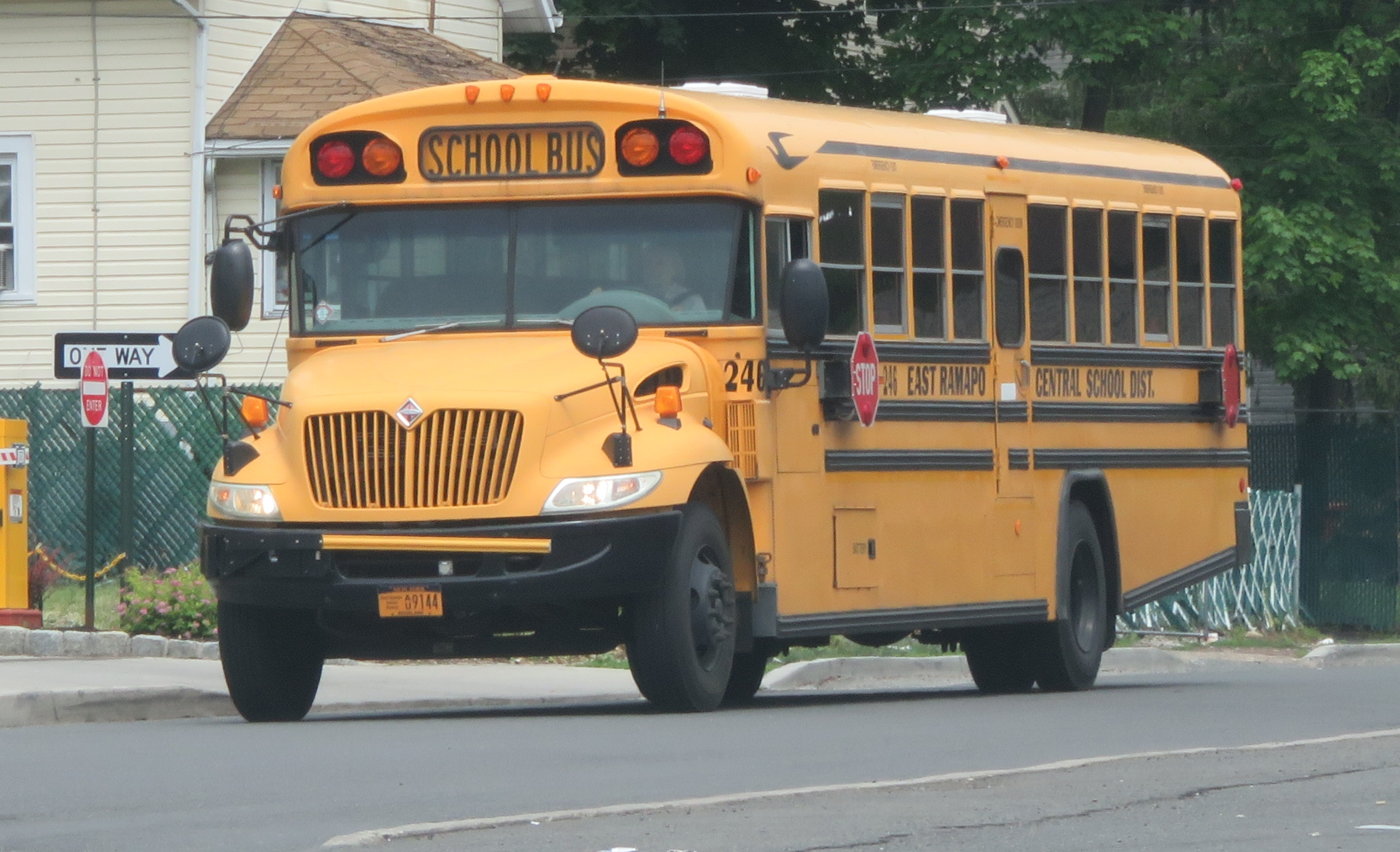
Blue Bird SBCV

As an effect of the alignment between industry chassis suppliers and school bus body manufacturers, production of the International 3300 has been more directly associated with IC Bus than its 3800 predecessor. From 2004 to 2008, the 3300 was also bodied by Blue Bird Corporation, who offered it as an additional model alongside its proprietary Blue Bird Vision conventional.

Since 2009, the 3300 chassis has been bodied by IC Bus exclusively in the United States and Canada. Navistar also manufactured the chassis for export, though body manufacturers outside North America did not produce school bus bodies for the chassis.

| Body Manufacturer | Model Name | Years in Production | Notes |
|---|---|---|---|
| Blue Bird Corporation | SBCV | 2004–2008 | The final version of the Blue Bird Conventional, the SBCV replaced the GM-chassis CV200. Sold alongside the Vision, which replaced it after 2008. |
| IC Bus | BE-Series CE-Series | 2004–2015 (BE) 2004–2023 (CE) | The IC BE used a low-profile version of the 3300 chassis (flat-floor interior and smaller wheels). |

=== Powertrain ===
At the time of its introduction, the International 3300 was sold exclusively with Navistar-sourced diesel engines. For 2008 production, the VT365 and DT466 engines were replaced by the MaxxForce 7 and MaxxForce DT engines, respectively. Introduced as an option during 2013, Cummins ISB6.7 diesels became the standard diesel engine during 2015.

In 2015, the 3300 expanded to alternative-fuel powertrains, as Navistar introducing a PSI-supplied (Power Solutions International) propane-fuel engine; in 2017, the same engine became available fueled by gasoline. In 2018, IC Bus introduced a prototype fully-electric bus based on a 3300 chassis, named chargE; the production of the fully-electric vehicle is intended for 2020.

International 3300 Powertrain (2005-present)
| Engine | Configuration | Fuel | Production | Notes |
|---|---|---|---|---|
| Navistar VT365 V8 | 6.0 L (365 cu in) 32V turbocharged V8 | Diesel | 2004-2007 | Standard on CE200 and BE-Series Replaced by MaxxForce 7 |
| Navistar MaxxForce 7 V8 | 6.3 L (387 cu in) 32V turbocharged V8 (2008-2010) 6.3 L (387 cu in) 32V twin (sequential) turbo V8 (2010-2015) | Diesel | 2008-2015 | Standard on CE and BE |
| Navistar DT466 I6 Navistar MaxxForce DT I6 | 7.6 L (466 cu in) 24V turbocharged I6 (2005-2009) 7.6 L (466 cu in) 24V twin-turbo I6 (2010-2014) | Diesel | 2004-2007 (DT466) 2008-2014 (MFDT) | Optional engine on CE (unavailable on BE) Replaced by Cummins ISB6.7 |
| Cummins ISB6.7 I6 | 6.7 L (409 cu in) 24V turbocharged I6 | Diesel | 2013-2023 | Introduced in 2014 model-year production as option as replacement for MaxxForce DT. Became standard engine in 2015 production. |
| PSI 8.8L V8 (Power Solutions Int'l) | 8.8 L (535 cu in) 16V V8 | LPG/Propane Gasoline | 2015-2023 (propane) 2017-2023 (gasoline) | The gasoline-fuel IC CE is the first gasoline-fueled vehicle produced by Navistar since 1986. |

== Variants ==
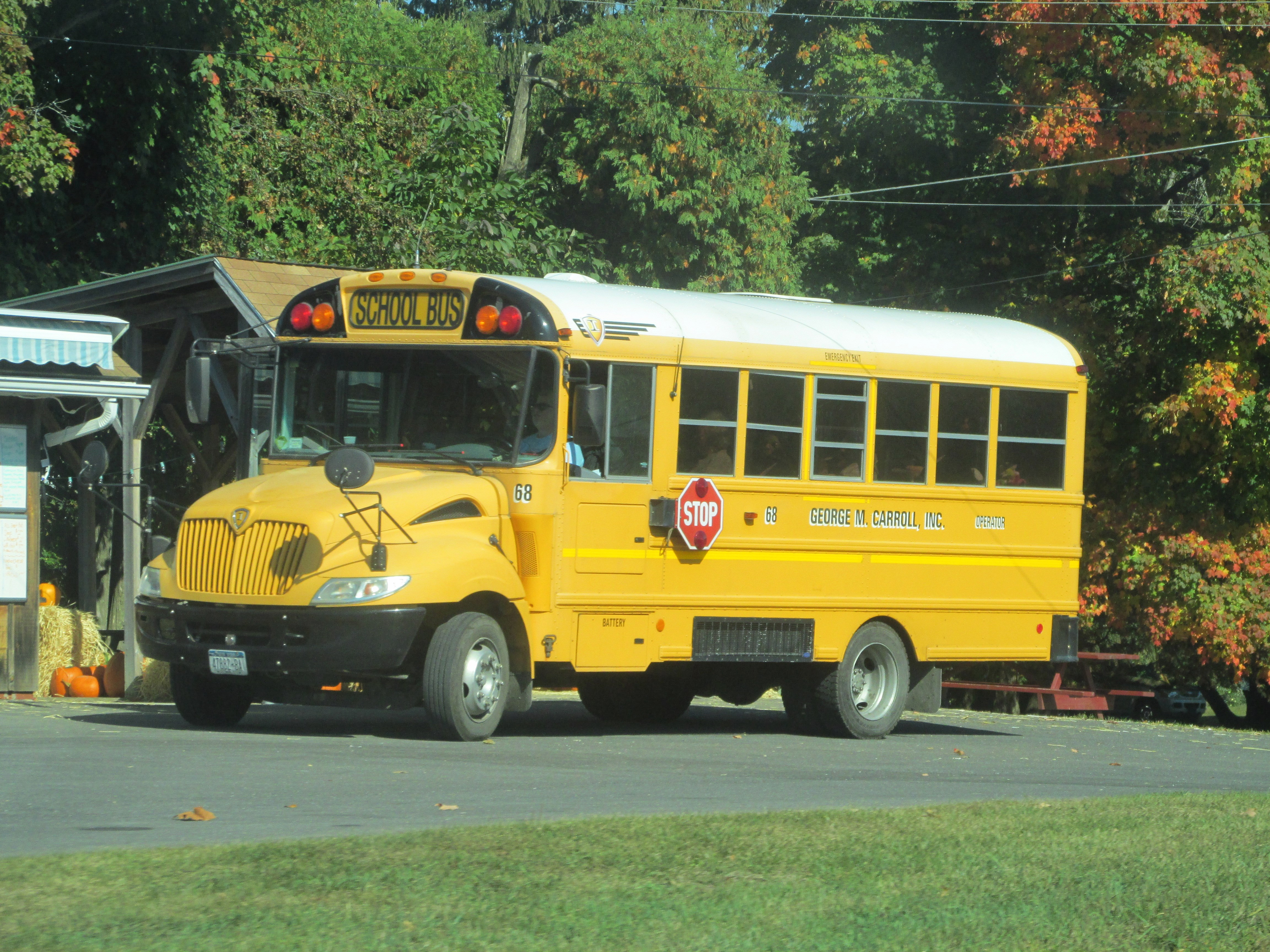
An IC BE200 school bus. Note the smaller wheels.

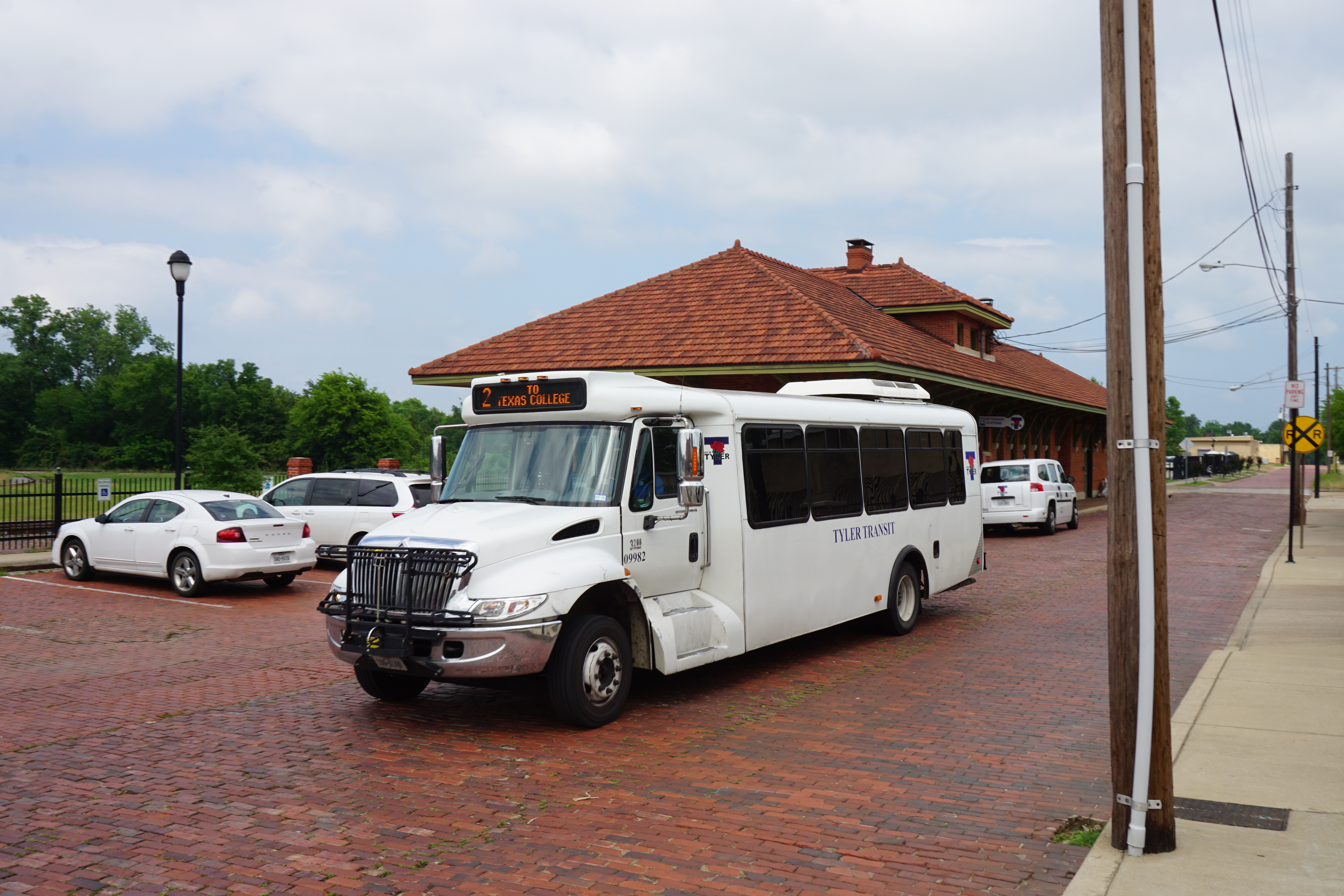
International 3200 low-floor bus (IC LC body)

=== 3300 (low profile) ===
From 2004 to 2015, IC Bus produced a Type-B low-profile version of the 3300 chassis, serving as the basis of the IC BE-Series bus. Produced primarily as a school bus and as its commercial-market derivatives, the BE was designed for operators transporting special-needs passengers. As the chassis is a cowled chassis, the IC BE is the only Type B school bus to be built on a cowled chassis, compared to others which were built on a stripped chassis. As an alternative to van-based buses, the BE was designed with a flat-floor interior, maximizing the available space for wheelchair passengers.

Unlike the full-size 3300, the low-profile 3300 was only sold with V8 engines, those being the VT365 and the MaxxForce 7.

=== 3200 ===
From 2004 to 2015, the cutaway-cab variant of the International DuraStar was produced for bus use, designated the International 3200, replacing the previous-generation 3400 based on the S-Series cab. Alongside second-party manufacturers, in 2006, IC began production of several types of commercial bodies for the 3200 chassis, including transit shuttle buses, tour buses, limo buses, and low-floor transit buses.

Following the 2010 introduction of the IC AE/AC-Series (based on the smaller International TerraStar), many cutaway International buses adopted IC grille badging, though the 3200 itself was never marketed with a school bus body.

== See also ==
- Navistar International - manufacturer
- IC Bus - primary body manufacturer
- List of buses
