= International WorkStar =

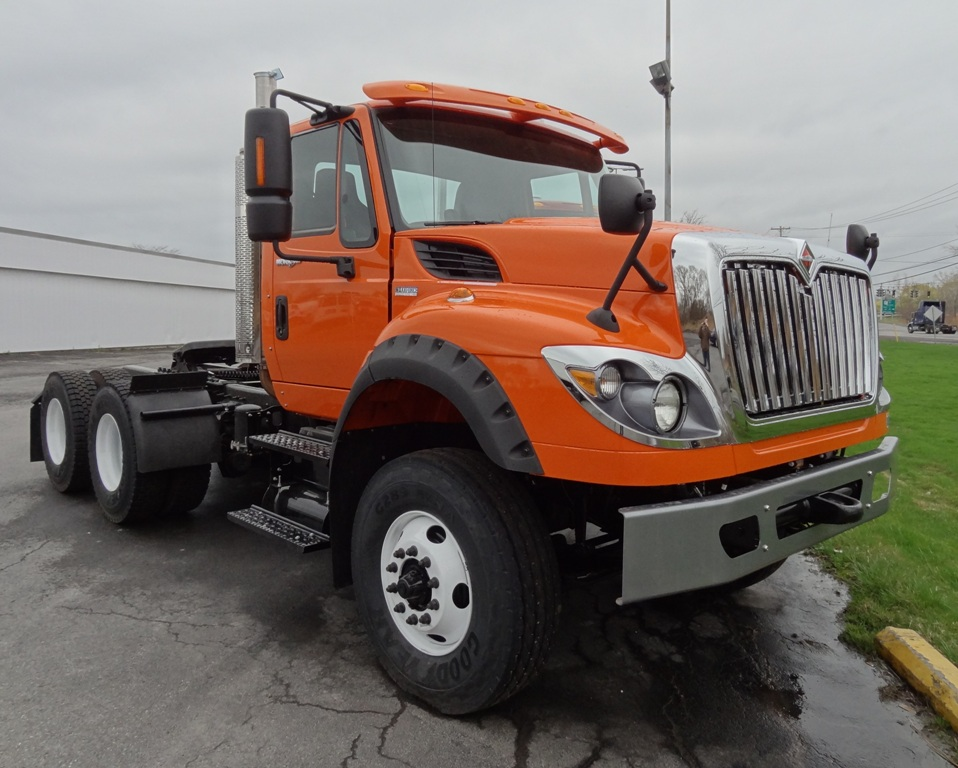
- 2012 International WorkStar

Overview
- Type: Conventional cab
- Manufacturer: International Trucks
- Production: 2008–2018; 2013-2017 (New Zealand)
- Assembly: Garland, Texas; Tauranga, New Zealand

Body and chassis
- Class: Class 7–9; Severe Service
- Related: International DuraStar

Powertrain
- Engine: Cummins ISB6.7; Cummins ISL9; MaxxForce DT; Maxxforce 10; MaxxForce 13
- Transmission: 6-speed automatic; 6-speed manual; 13-speed manual; 18-speed manual

Chronology
- Predecessor: 7400 and 7600 Series
- Successor: HV Series

The International WorkStar was a line of severe duty trucks produced by Navistar, Inc. The WorkStar was the successor to the 7400 and 7600 series trucks produced by International. Starting in 2008 the "thousand series" name was dropped in favor of the WorkStar. This change was reflected in the physical construction of the truck in the form of a new hood and grille along with increased MaxxForce Engine options.

For the New Zealand market the WorkStar was assembled locally as a right hand drive product from 2013 through to 2017. There were two variants, the WorkStar 7400 with the 'visibility hood', and the WorkStar 7600 with a MaxxForce 13L engine.

The WorkStar series was replaced beginning in the 2018 model year with the International HV Series.

== Models ==
The WorkStar was commonly custom-built, and had many different layouts. All models are available as 4x2, (Note: Number of wheels × number of powered wheels, with dual tires counted as a single wheel.) the 7300-7500 have all-wheel drive 4x4 models. The 7400-7600 were available with both 6x4 and 6x6 tandems, and the 7600 could have an unusual 8x6 layout, with a three driven axle "tridem" configuration. Most models could have either set-forward or set-back front axles.

Electrical systems become very complex, both for engine control and monitoring the chassis. Controls for power take-offs (PTOs), body operations, snowplow and other types of auxiliary lighting could be factory installed.

Cabs were available in standard, extended, and crew types on all models. Made of galvanized steel, they could have heated windshield, mirrors, air-conditioning and many interior options.

Selected 2016 Models (not all are shown.)

Model	Max. front GAWR (Note: Gross Axle Weight Rating is the loaded weight of the axle.)	Max. rear GAWR	Max. GVWR (Note: Gross Vehicle Weight Rating is the loaded weight of the truck.)	Engine (Note: Highest rated engine.)	Trans
7300 4x2	10,000 lb (4,500 kg) (Note: Lightest rating.)	17,500 lb (7,900 kg)	27,500 lb (12,500 kg)	ISB6.7	6M, 6A
7400 6x4	20,000 lb (9,100 kg)	46,000 lb (21,000 kg)	60,000 lb (27,000 kg)	N9	13M, A
7500 6x4	22,000 lb (10,000 kg)	52,000 lb (24,000 kg)	60,000 lb (27,000 kg)	ISL9 N10	18M, A
7600 8x6	22,000 lb (10,000 kg)	69,000 lb (31,000 kg)	76,000 lb (34,000 kg)	N13	18M, A

== Powertrain ==
In 2014, the WorkStar was available with 4 diesel engine models. The lowest rated was the MaxxForce DT, a 466 cu in (7.6 L) inline 6 with 215 hp (160 kW) at 2200 rpm. The highest rated wss the N13, a 758 cu in (12.4 L) inline 6 with up to 475 hp (354 kW) at 1850 rpm.

Eaton/Fuller offered manual transmissions from 6 to 18 speeds, and a self-shifting manual. Allison offered three automatic transmissions.

2016 Engines

Model (Note: Engines are Cummins (Cum) or Navistar (Nav))	Displacement	Type (Note: Mid-range (Mid) or Heavy-duty (HD))	Power (Note: Highest rated model.)	Torque
Cum ISB6.7	408 cu in (6.7 L)	Mid	200 hp (150 kW) (Note: Lowest rated model)	520 lb⋅ft (710 N⋅m)
Cum ISL9	543 cu in (8.9 L)	HD	380 hp (280 kW)	1,250 lb⋅ft (1,690 N⋅m)
Nav N9	570 cu in (9.3 L)	Mid	330 hp (250 kW)	950 lb⋅ft (1,290 N⋅m)
Nav 10	570 cu in (9.3 L)	HD	370 hp (280 kW)	1,250 lb⋅ft (1,690 N⋅m)
Nav 13	758 cu in (12.4 L)	HD	475 hp (354 kW)	1,250 lb⋅ft (1,690 N⋅m)

== WorkStar applications ==
Construction The primary use of the WorkStar was as a heavy 6x4 dump truck with a GVWR of approximately 50,000 lb (23,000 kg). With all the upgrades possible, it can be used as a concrete mixer, where the heavy duty front drive axle is often used. It can also be a semi-tractor, pulling dump or lowboy trailers.

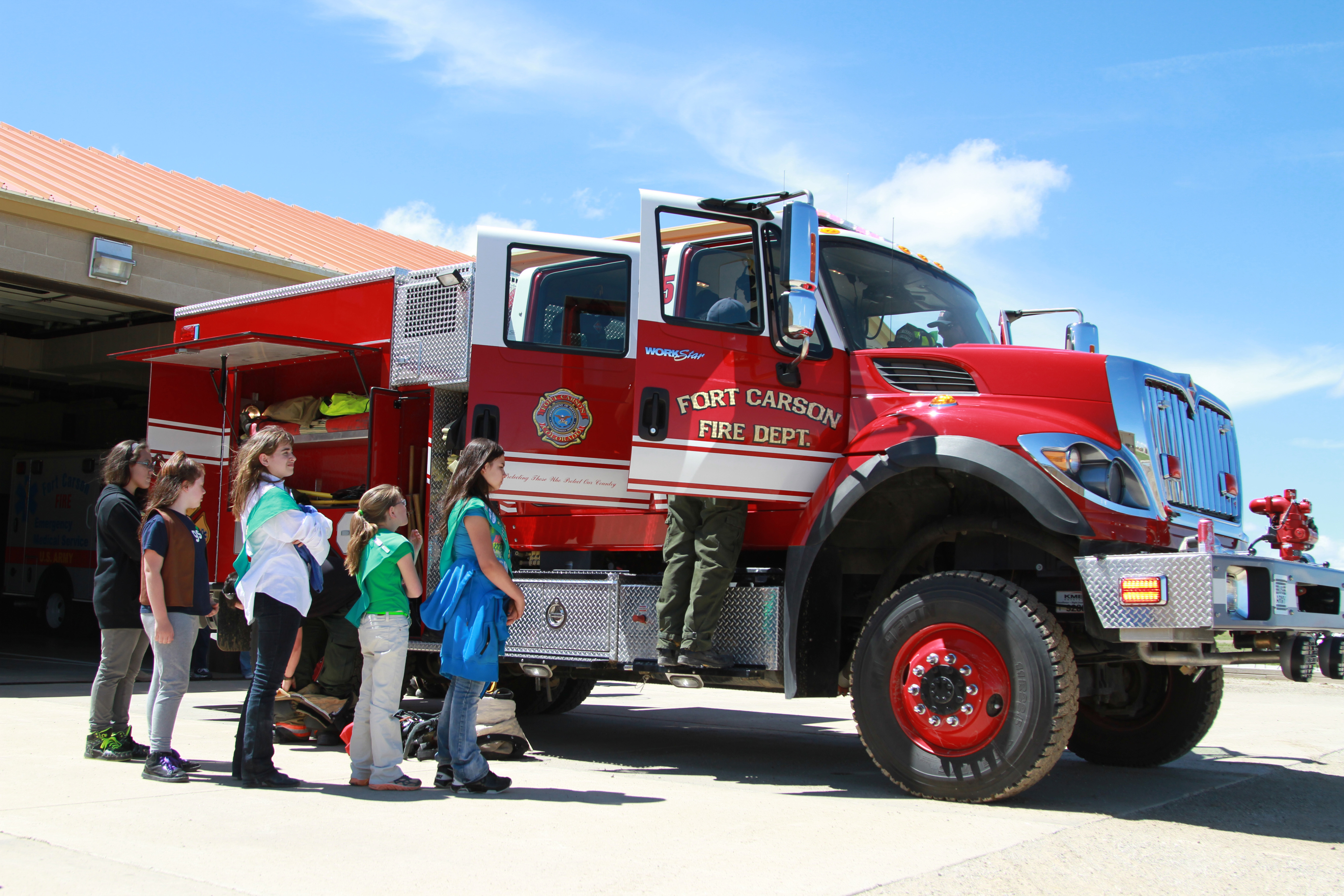
Off-road fire engine

Fire equipment. In rural areas of the US, especially in state and national parks, fire equipment had to go to remote off-road areas, often carrying water with them. The WorkStar had the options needed, high strength and power, heavy duty front drive axle, an advanced electrical system, and a crew-cab. An extreme truck could be ordered with factory parts.

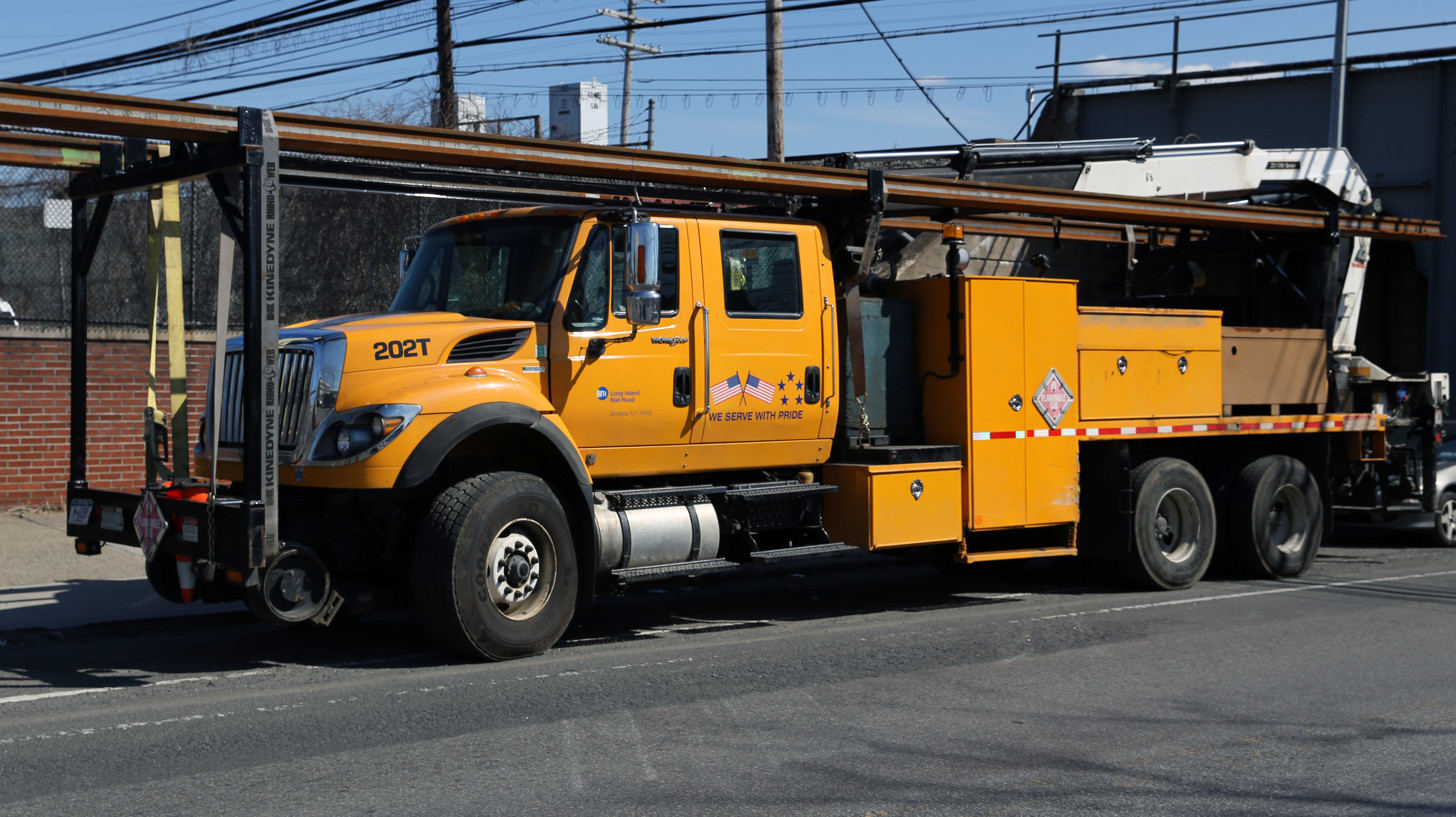
Railroad maintenance truck

Railroad maintenance. Railroad equipment is very heavy, and the track needs maintenance its whole length, no matter how remote. The WorkStar's chassis could be ordered to mount road-rail pilot wheels, which let the truck run directly on the tracks. Racks could be mounted outside and above the cab so the truck could self-load and unload sections of rail onto them. The crew-cab was often used, and the truck also carried a large amount of tools and equipment.

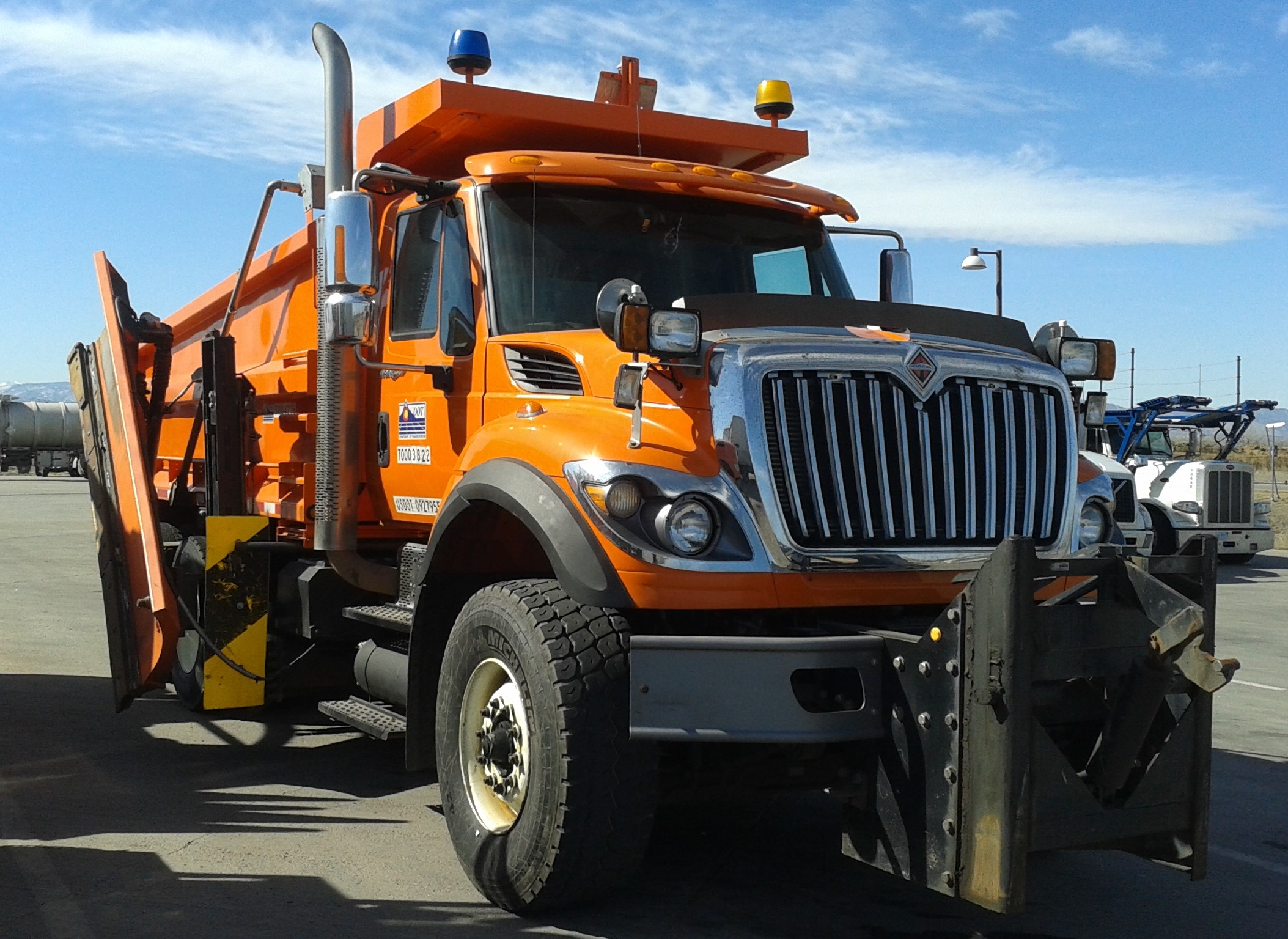
Plow dump truck

Street and road maintenance In the northern US, snow is a problem for roads, which need to be plowed and salted. Built with wiring and controls for lights and equipment, body options like heated windshields, mirrors, and seats, the truck comes ready for that service from the factory. The strong chassis with heavy-duty front wheel drive can plow around the clock for days.

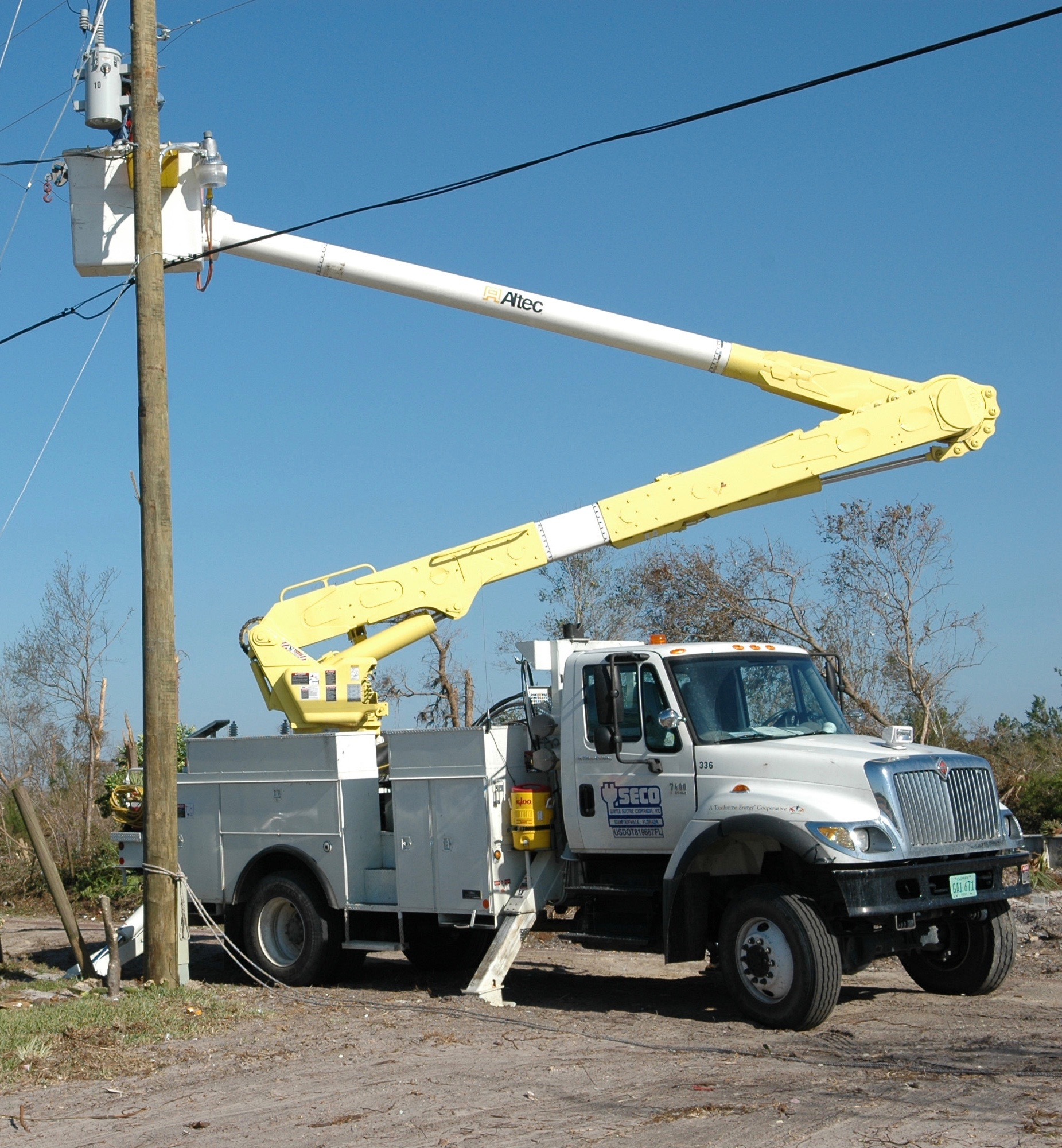
Utility boom truck

Utilities The WorkStar was popular with utilities, who often worked off-road for long periods in bad weather. The front driven axle was very useful when the truck was moved to many different sites. The strong frame adapted to outriggers and a long boom, so employees could work on overhead wires.

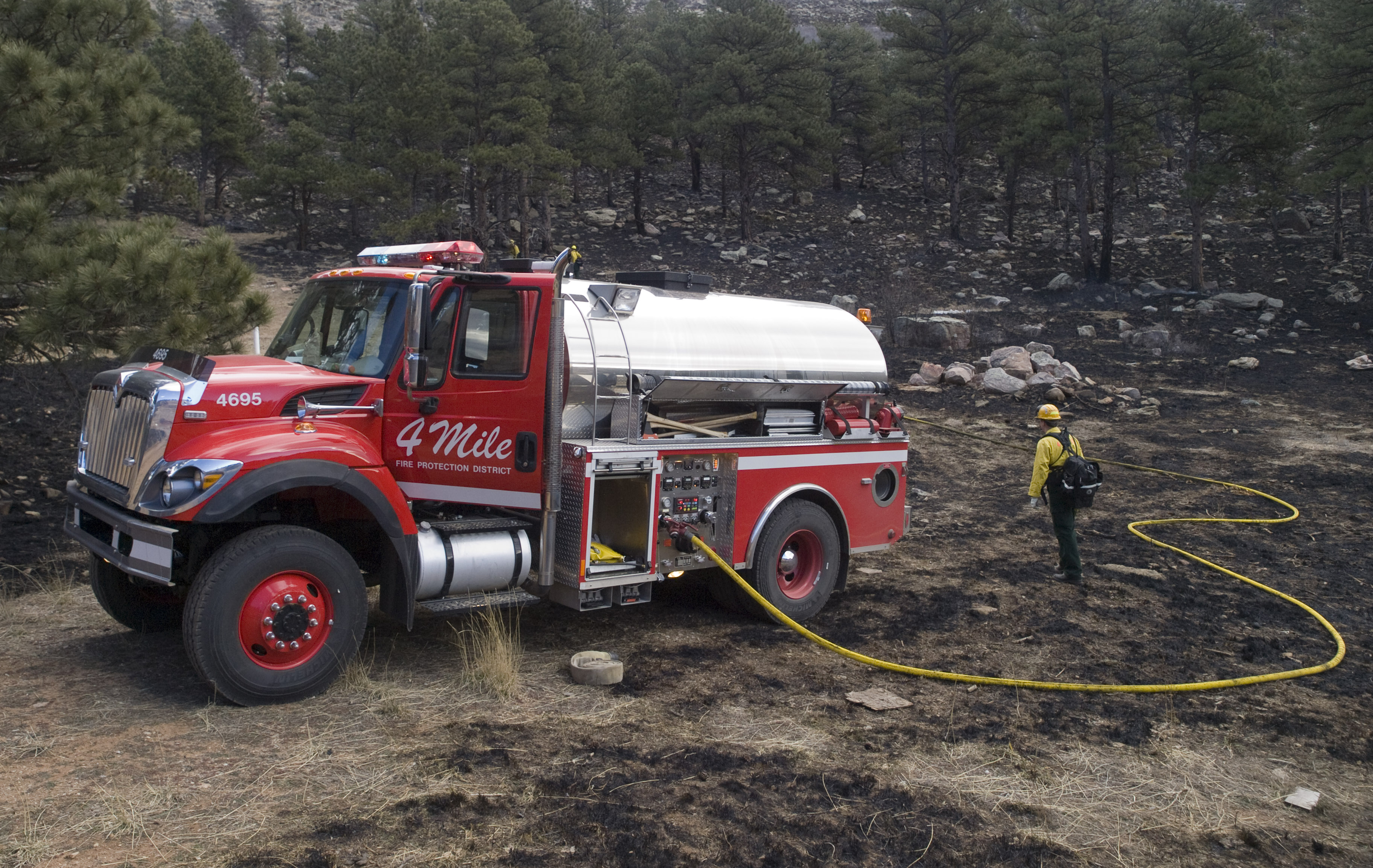
Fire tank truck

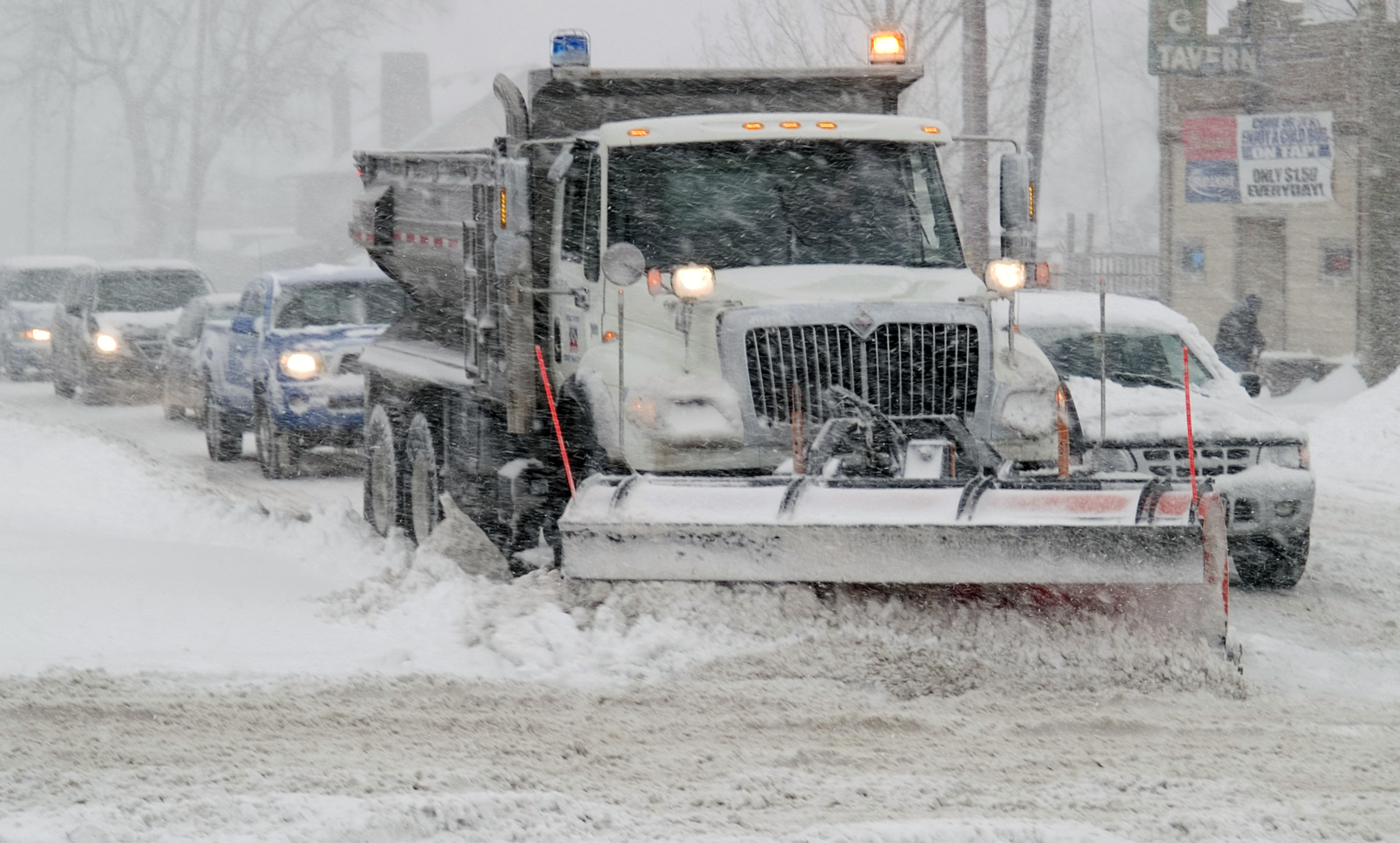
Snowplow with spreader body

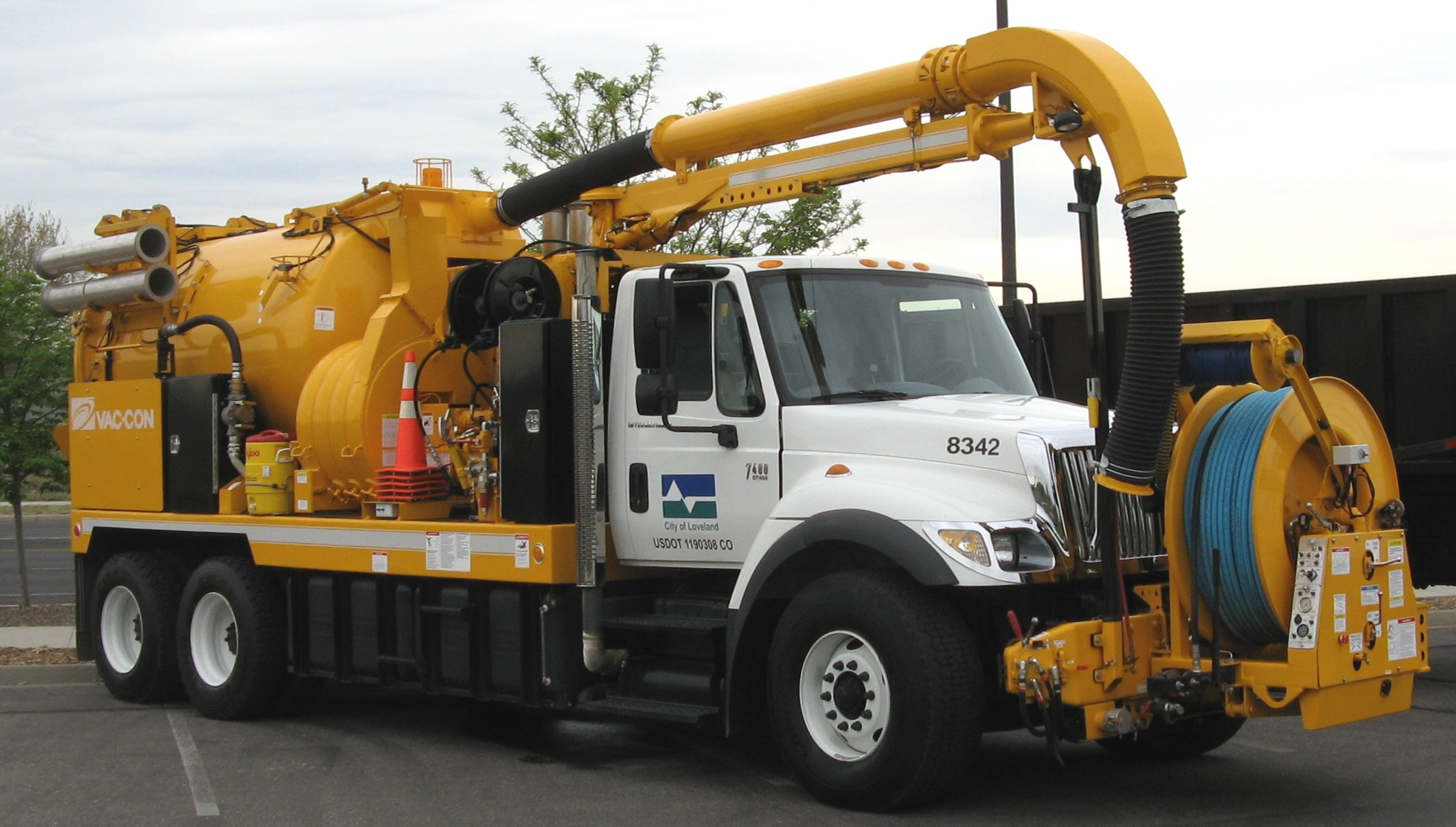
Sewer vacuum truck

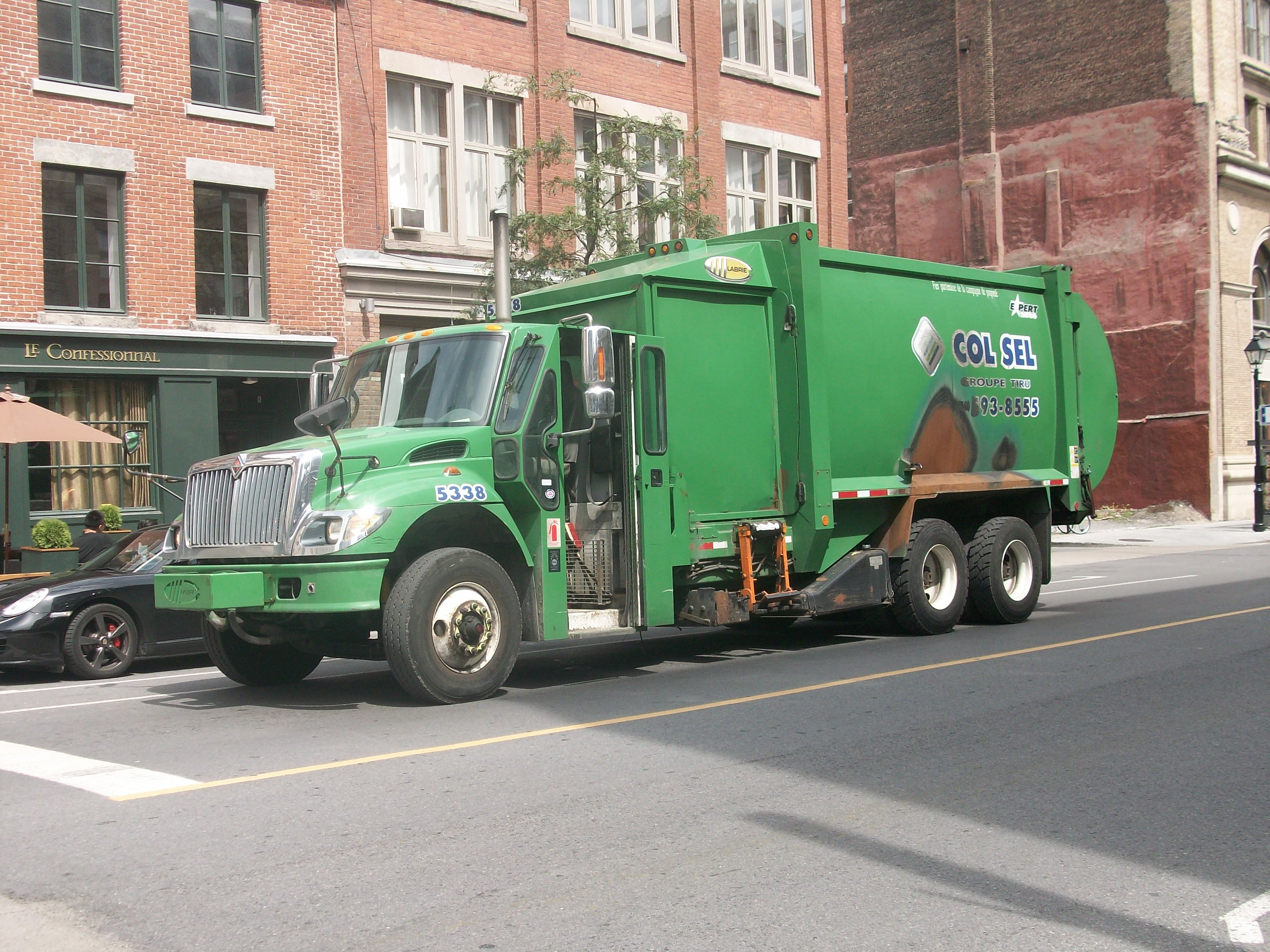
Refuse collection truck

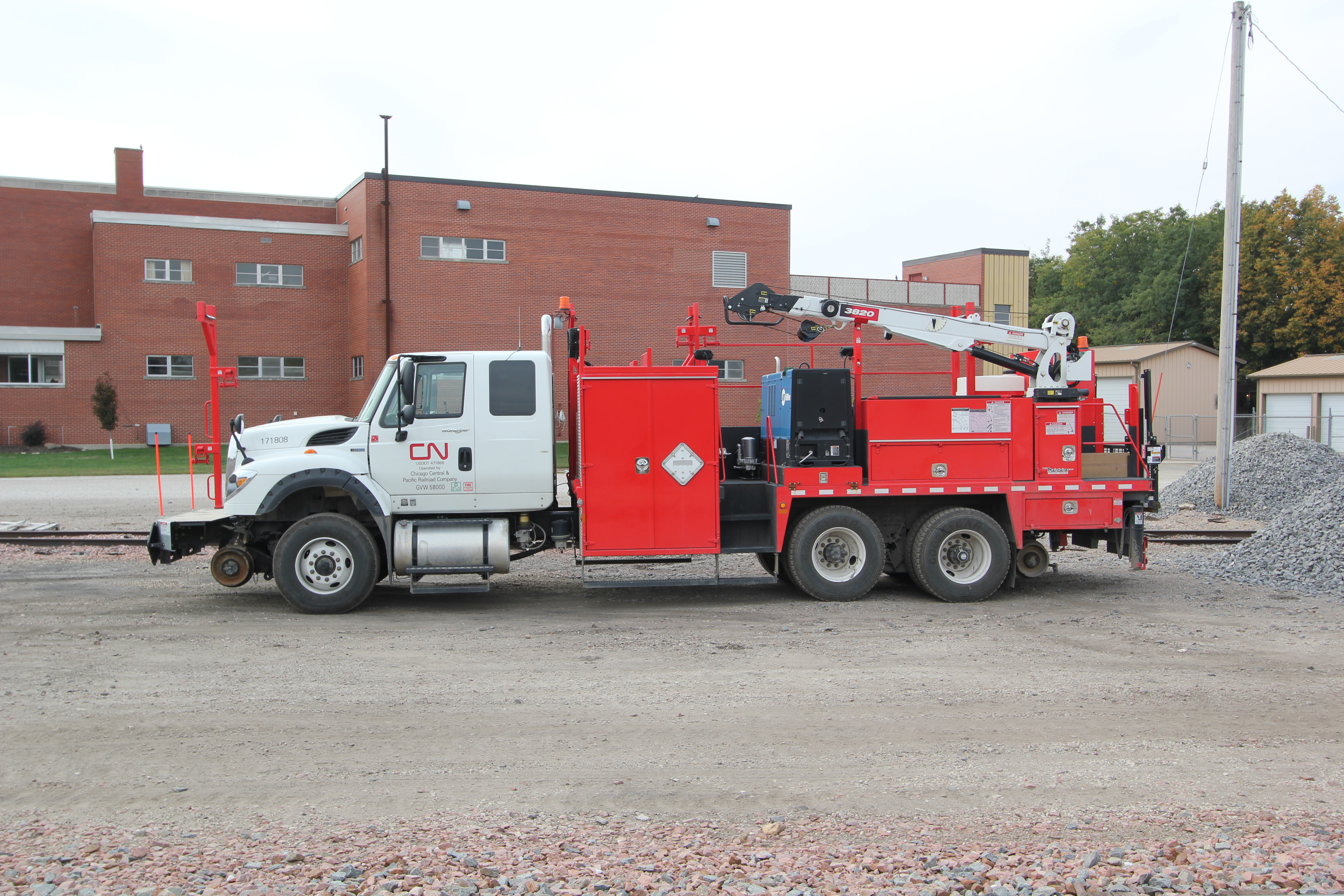
Railroad maintenance truck
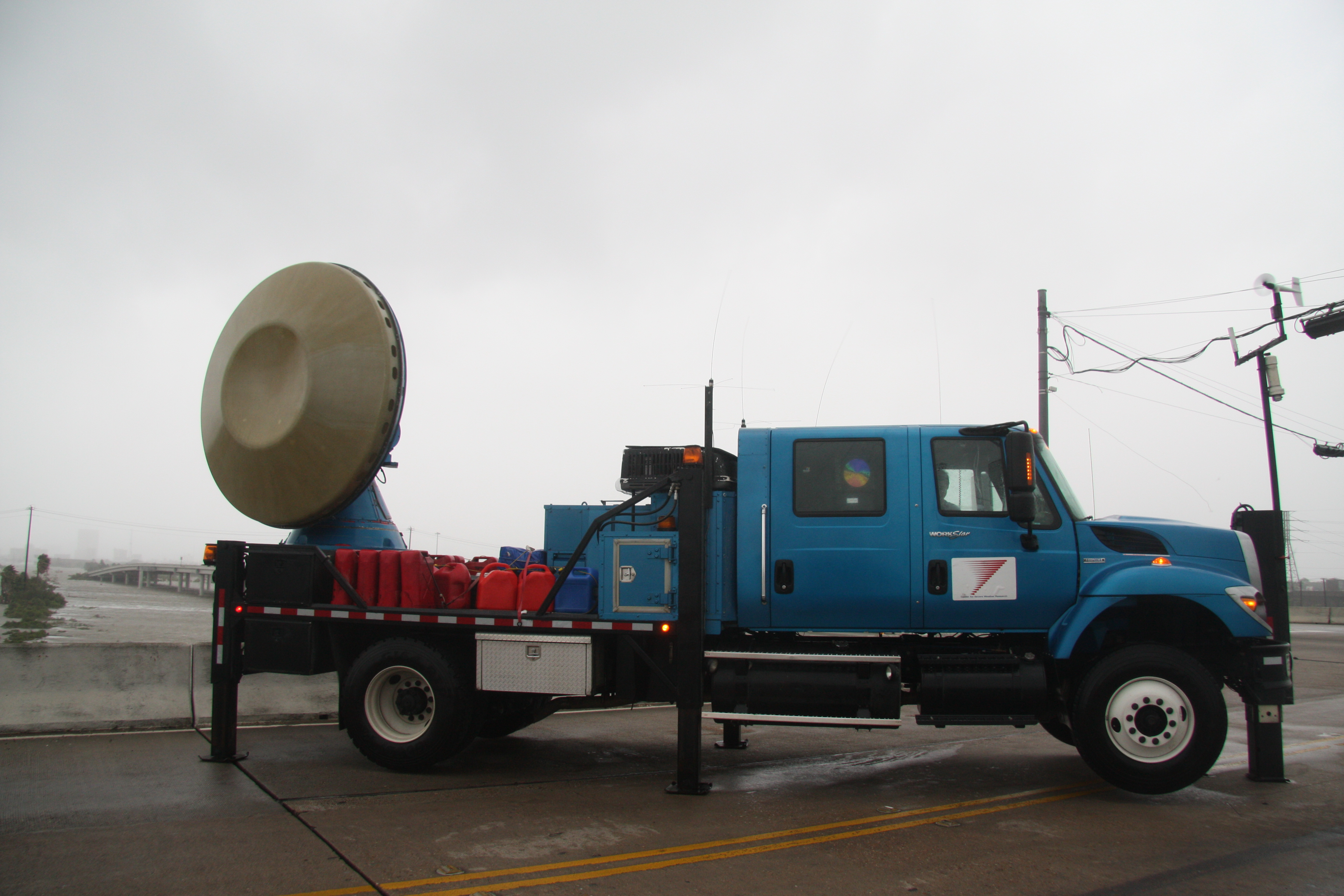
Doppler on Wheels (DOW) Truck

== Aftermarket ==
The consumer version of the WorkStar was manufactured by Midwest Automotive Designs, which is a manufacturer based in Elkhart, Indiana that produces conversions of class 5 and 6 commercial trucks conversions as luxury consumer vehicles. The company made several pickup truck models of the WorkStar, including the International WorkStar Pickup, and WorkStar SUV.
