= Ford LCF =

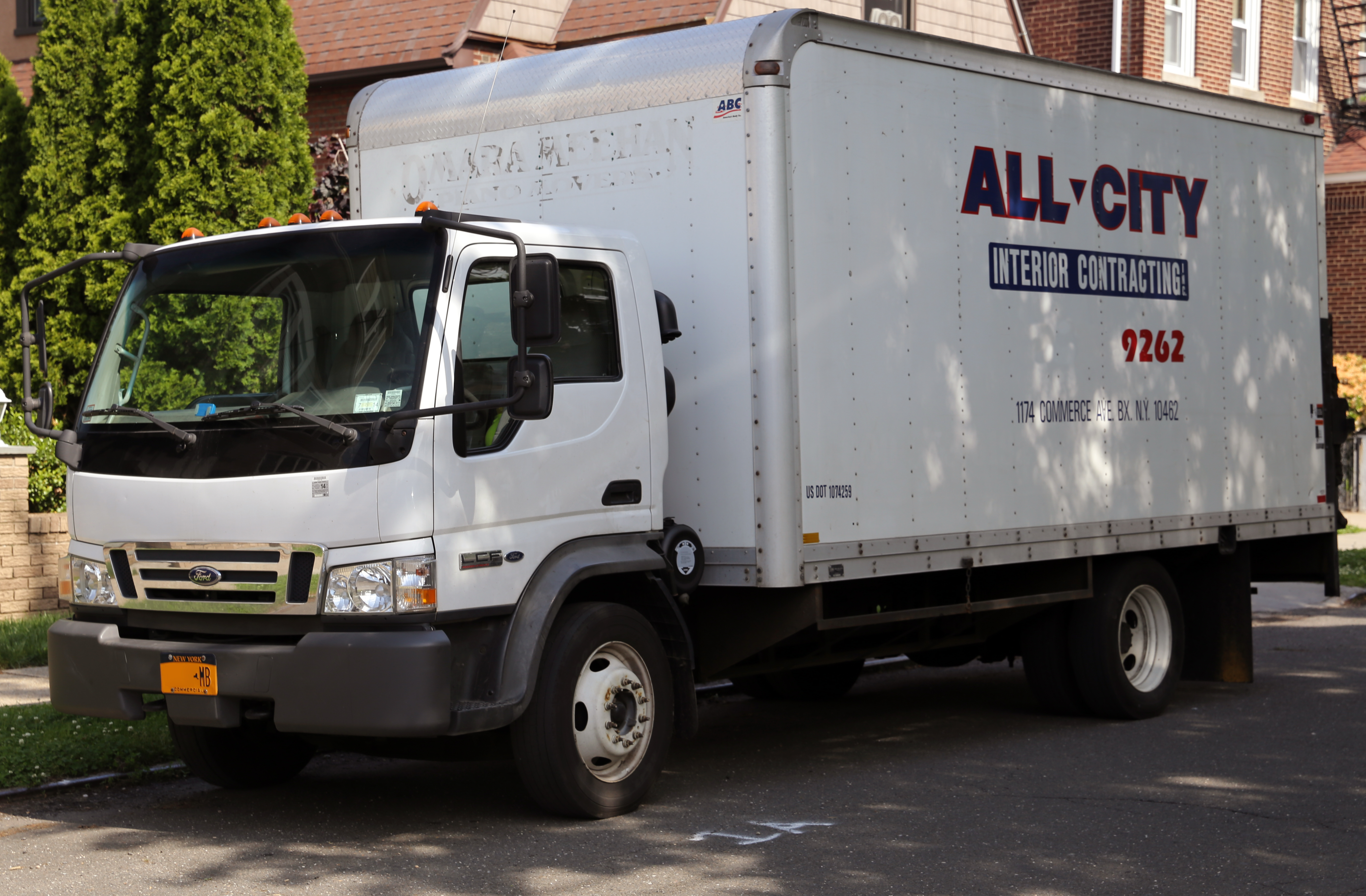

Overview
- Manufacturer: Blue Diamond Truck Company LLC (Ford and Navistar International joint venture); Mazda (cab assembly)
- Also called: Ford LCF-45, Ford LCF-55; International City Star
- Production: 2006–2009
- Assembly: General Escobedo, Mexico

Body and chassis
- Class: Cab Forward truck
- Body style: Cab-over-engine
- Related: Mazda Titan

Powertrain
- Engine: 4.5 L (275 cu in) Power Stroke V6 Diesel (Navistar VT275 Engine)
- Transmission: 5-speed 5R110W with Tow/Haul Feature (with or without PTO)

Chronology
- Predecessor: Ford Cargo

The Ford LCF (Low Cab Forward) is a medium-duty cab-over truck that was marketed by Ford Motor Company from 2006 to 2009. The first cab-over (COE) vehicle sold by Ford since the company sold the rights to the Ford Cargo design (in North America) to Freightliner in 1996, the LCF was developed as a Class 4/5 truck, competing in a market segment dominated by the Isuzu NPR (and its rebadged Chevrolet/GMC variants). Sold in various wheelbases, the model line was developed for various configurations, including dump trucks, fire trucks, tow trucks, box trucks, crane/bucket trucks, flat beds and stake bodies.

Produced in a joint venture with Navistar International, (known as Blue Diamond, a nod to the Ford "Blue" Oval and the Navistar "Diamond"), the LCF was also marketed by Navistar as the International CF/CityStar. The first (and only) collaborative design to emerge from the joint venture, the LCF/CityStar was assembled in General Escobedo, Mexico, alongside the Ford F-650/F-750 Super Duty and International DuraStar.

Following slow sales of the LCF/CityStar, the model line was discontinued by both companies after 2009. As of current production, the LCF remains the final COE marketed by Ford in North America (of any size).

== Design overview ==
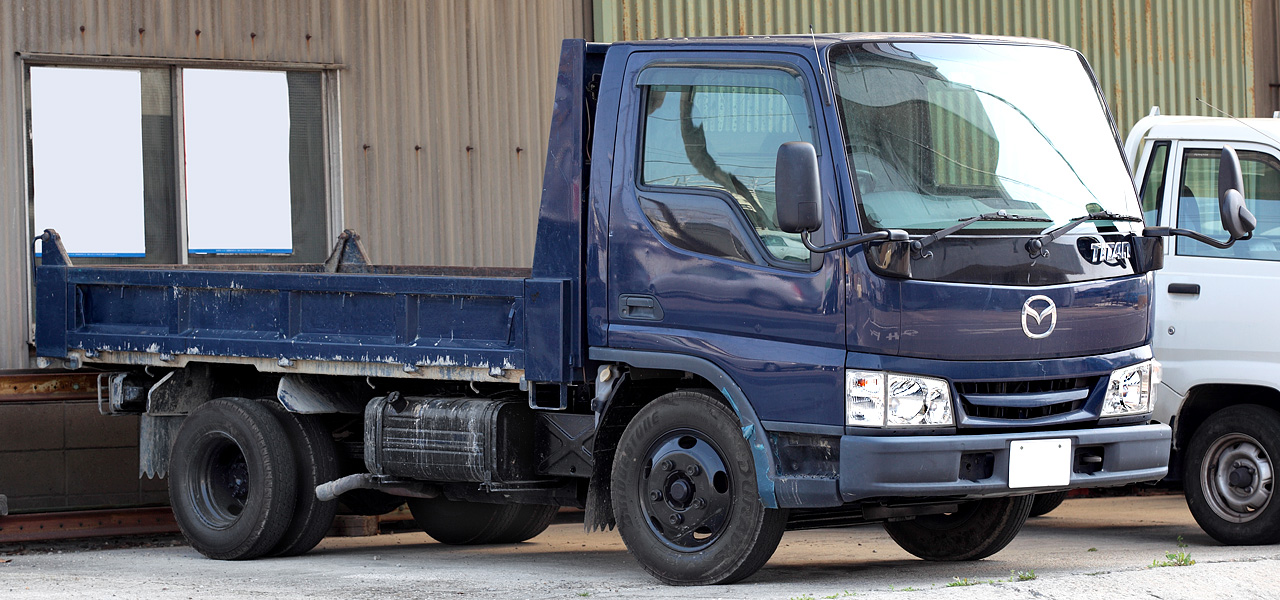
4th-generation Mazda Titan, source of cab assembly

The Ford LCF derived its chassis from the Ford F-450/F-550 Super Duty trucks, sourcing its cab from the Japanese-market Mazda Titan introduced in 2000. The LCF and CF were fitted with a single powertrain: a 4.5-litre V6 version of the 6-litre PowerStroke/VT365. While the engine itself was exclusive to the two trucks, it was mated to the five-speed Torqshift (5R110W) transmission shared with the Super Duty pickup line

Standard features included manual windows and steel wheels and a painted grille; for an extra cost, power windows could be added alongside a chrome grille, bumper, and wheels. Styled similar to the Super Duty trucks, the grille of the LCF differed from its International counterpart, which featured vertical bars.

=== International CF/CityStar ===
Assembled alongside the Ford LCF in the Blue Diamond joint venture, the International CF (renamed CityStar in 2008) was the smallest truck marketed by Navistar International, succeeding the Nissan-sourced 400–900 series (discontinued in 1991). Differing from the LCF only by its grille and badging, Navistar marketed its 4.5L V6 as the VT275 engine.

For 2010, International returned to the Class 5 truck market, introducing the conventional-cab International TerraStar.

== See also ==
- List of low cab forward trucks
