= International TerraStar =

TerraStar
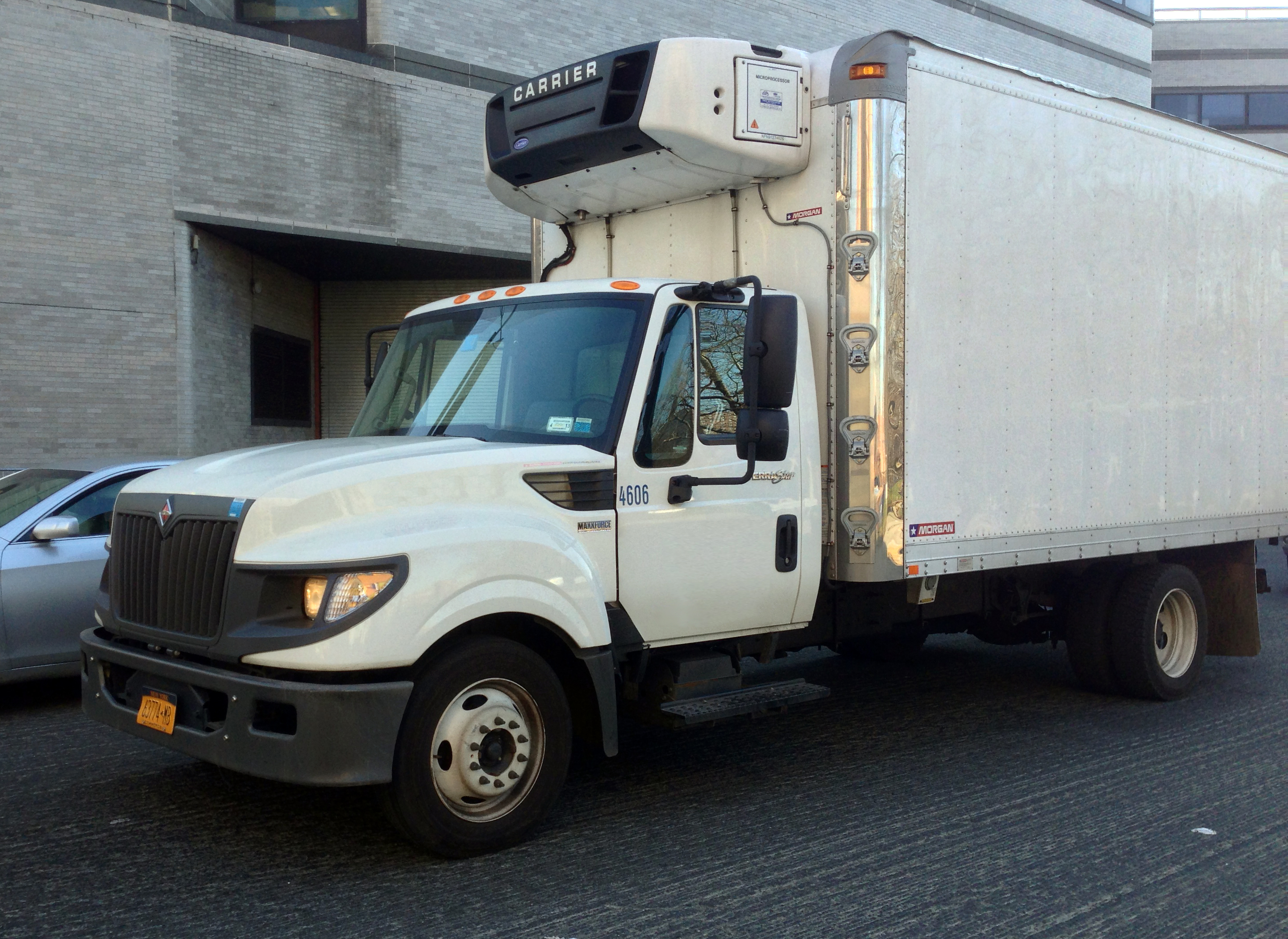

Overview
- Type: Truck
- Manufacturer: International Trucks
- Production: 2010-December 2015
- Model years: 2011-2016

Body and chassis
- Class: Class 5
- Body style: 2-door truck 2-door extended-cab truck 4-door crew cab truck
- Related: IC Bus AE-Series; IC Bus AC-Series

Powertrain
- Engine: 6.4 L (389 cu in) MaxxForce 7 turbodiesel V8
- Power output: 220 to 300 hp (164 to 224 kW); 562 to 662 lb⋅ft (762 to 898 N⋅m)
- Transmission: Allison 1000 6-speed automatic

Chronology
- Predecessor: International CF/CityStar LCF
- Successor: International CV

The International TerraStar is a medium-duty truck (Class 4 and 5) that was manufactured by International Trucks from 2010 to 2015. The smallest conventional-cab truck ever produced by International, the TerraStar competed against chassis-cab vehicles derived from large pickup trucks along with the smallest versions of the Freightliner M2 and Hino 600. Though never officially designated by the company as a replacement for the 2006-2009 CityStar LCF COE, the TerraStar is of similar dimensions and GVWR.

The model line is the smallest of the International NGV model family, sharing a cab with the International DuraStar medium-duty truck. In terms of payload, the TerraStar also served as the successor to the light-GVWR 4100 series within the DuraStar range.

Following the discontinuation of the MaxxForce 7 engine, International withdrew the model line after 2015 production. For 2019, the company returned to the size segment with the International CV, produced in a joint venture by International alongside the Chevrolet 4500-6500HD medium-duty line of trucks.

== Model overview ==
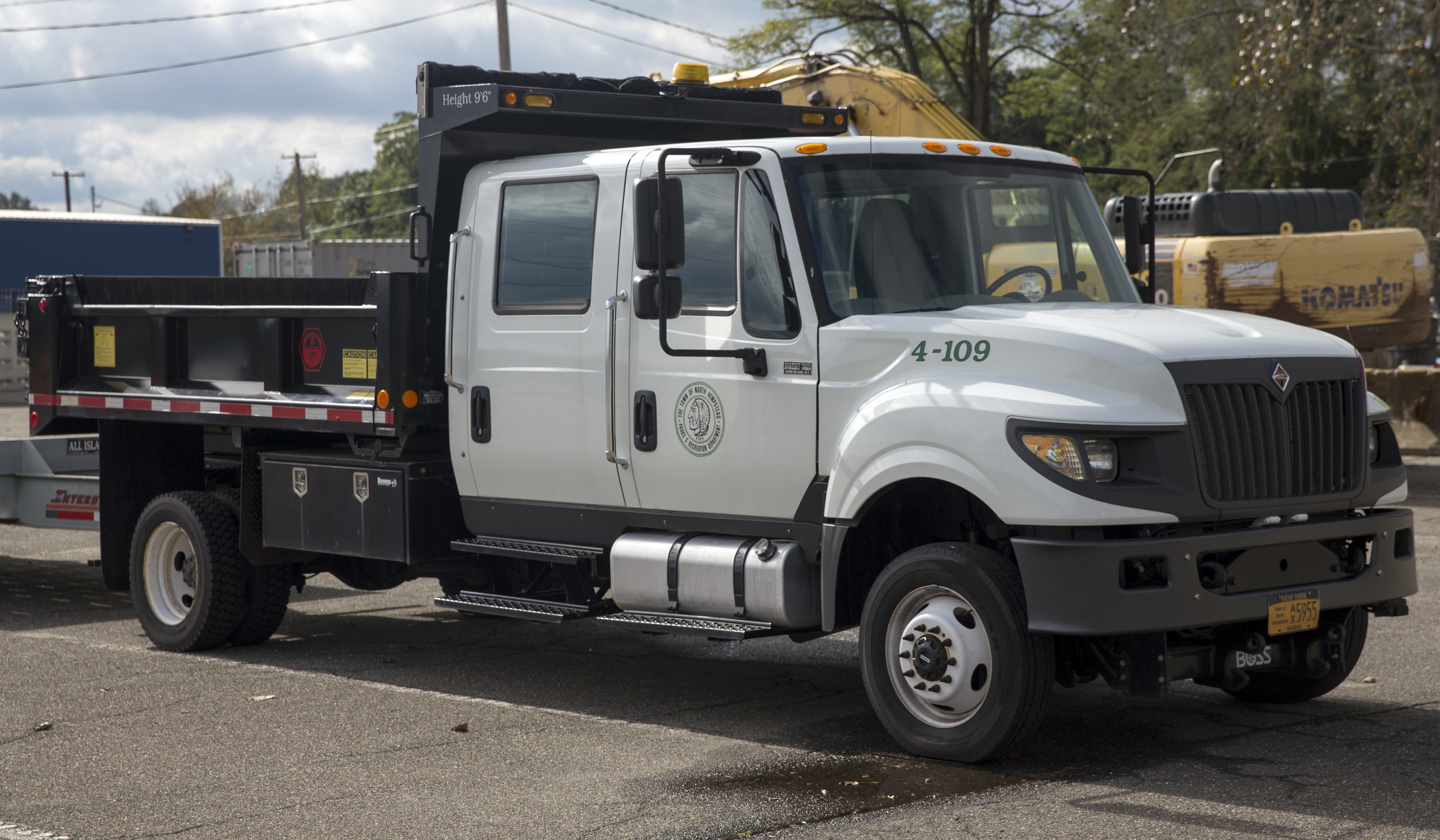
2016 International TerraStar crew cab

Sharing its cab with the International DuraStar, WorkStar, TranStar, and ProStar, the TerraStar is distinguished by its lower-profile hood (with smaller wheels on both axles) and cab. To create a lower mounting position for the cab, the fuel tanks were relocated from below the cab to behind it (remaining on the frame rails). The hood was fitted with a nearly flat grille and square sealed-beam headlights (similar to the WorkStar).

As with the DuraStar and WorkStar, the model line was offered in a two-door cab alongside an extended cab and four-door crew cab; its chassis-cab design was manufactured for the fitment of rear bodies fitted by second-stage manufacturers.

=== Powertrain details ===
In contrast to the DuraStar, the TerraStar was sold with relatively few powertrain combinations. Through its entire production, the model line was offered with a MaxxForce 7 turbodiesel V8 paired with a Allison 1000 6-speed automatic.

Originally configured solely with a single rear drive axle, four-wheel drive became available as an option in May 2013.

In 2015, Navistar moved away from EGR-based emissions systems, leading to the discontinuation of the MaxxForce 7 engine. This effectively left the model line with no engine and International withdrew the model line after 2015 production ended.

Engine	Configuration	Fuel	Output (horsepower)	Output (torque)	Transmission
Navistar MaxxForce 7	6.4 L (389 cu in) OHV 32V twin-turbocharged V8	Diesel	220–300 hp (164–224 kW)	562–662 lb⋅ft (762–898 N⋅m)	Allison 1000 6-speed automatic

== Variants ==
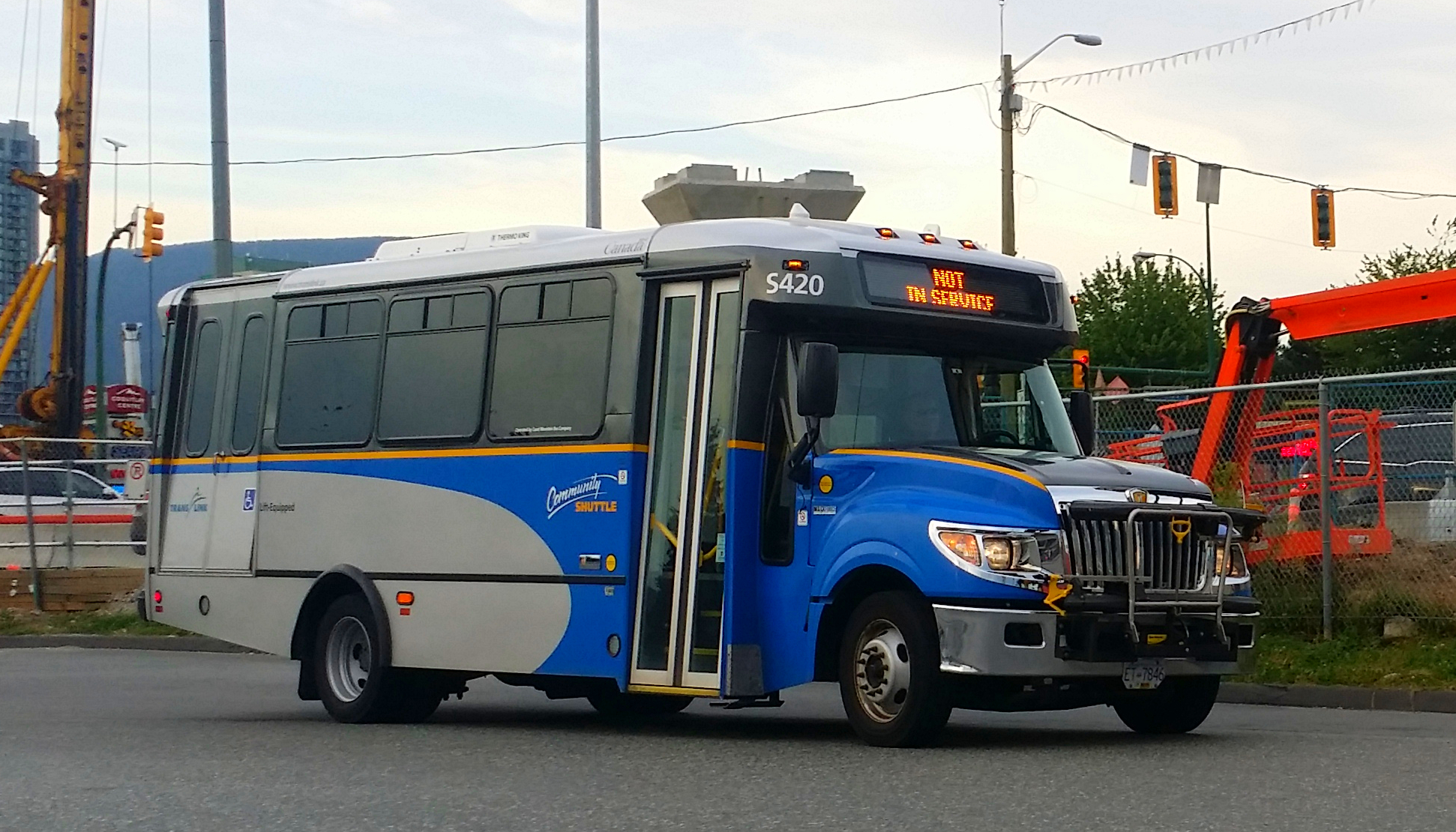
Coast Mountain Bus Company shuttle bus built on TerraStar chassis (IC AC-Series)

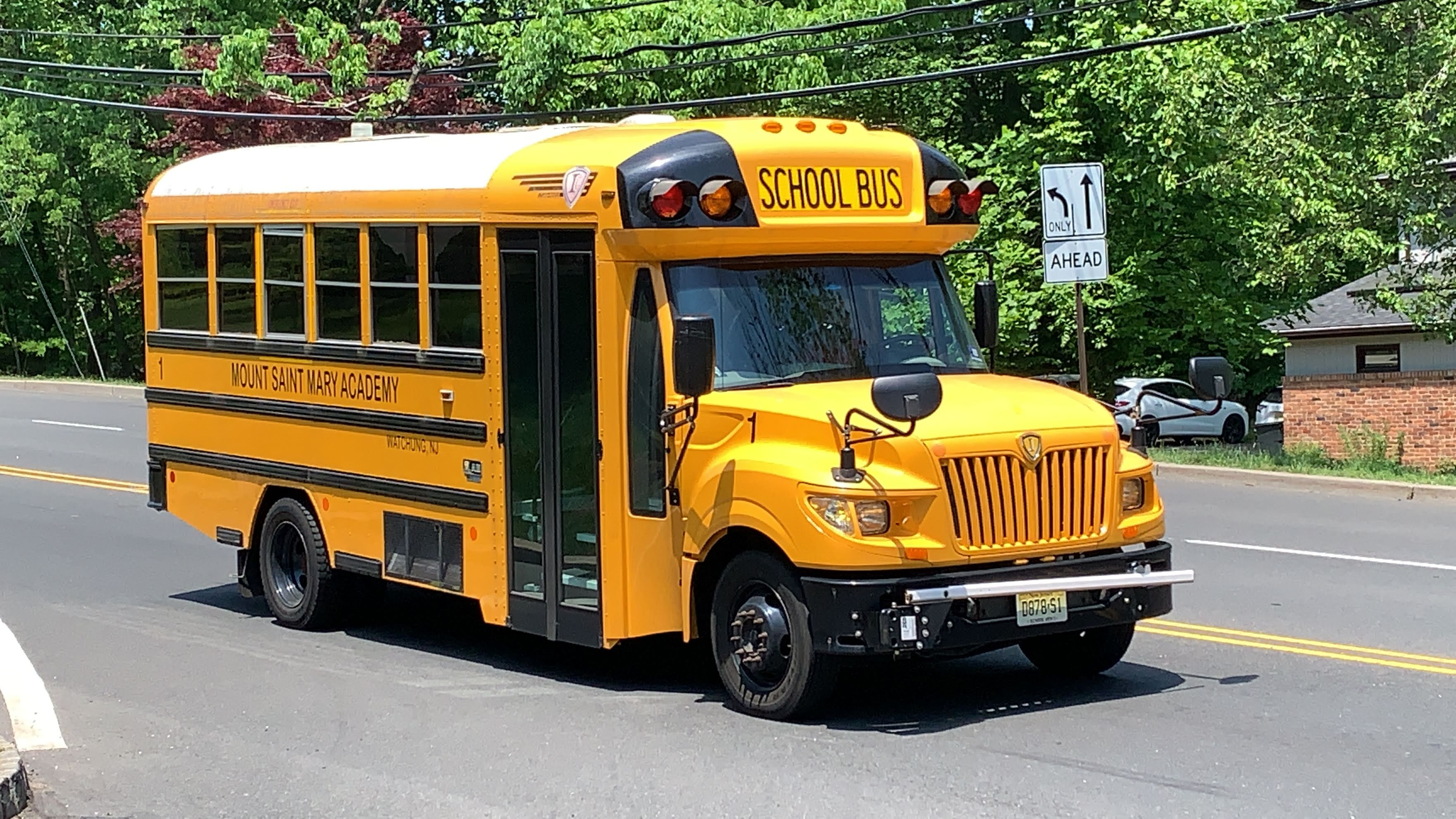
2015 IC AE (NJ Spec)

=== Bus ===
From 2010 to 2015, the TerraStar chassis was used by Navistar subsidiary IC Bus to develop its smallest vehicle ever produced. Intended largely as a heavier-duty alternative to vehicles produced on Ford E-450 and GMC Savana chassis, IC Bus introduced cutaway-cab buses derived from the TerraStar. The company marketed two versions, including the AC-Series shuttle bus and the AE-Series school bus.

In line with its truck counterpart, the AC/AE was discontinued at the end of 2015, following the withdrawal of the MaxxForce 7 engine.

=== Vehicle conversions ===
Although never offered as a consumer vehicle, during its production, the International TerraStar served as a donor chassis for second-party conversions. In a configuration similar to the larger International XT trucks, the crew-cab TerraStar was converted by Elkhart, Indiana-based Midwest Automotive Designs to a pickup truck or a four-door SUV.
