= International DuraStar =

Medium-duty truck series

International 4000 series; International DuraStar
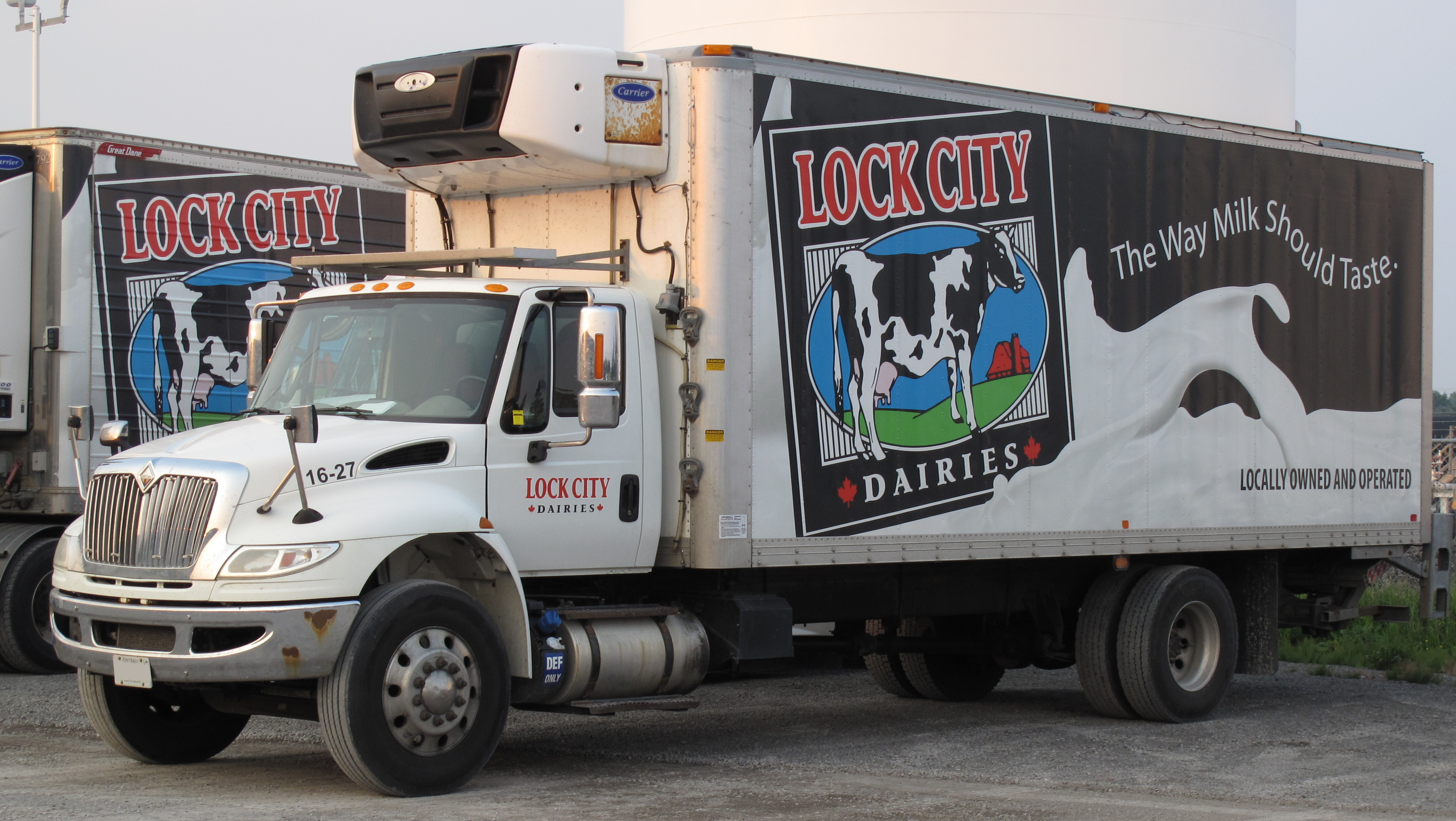
- 2016 International DuraStar 4300 box truck

Overview
- Manufacturer: 2001–2009: Blue Diamond Truck, LLC (Ford/Navistar joint venture); 2009–2018: Navistar International
- Production: 2001–2018

Body and chassis
- Class: Class 5; Class 6; Class 7
- Layout: 4x2; 6x4
- Body styles: Chassis cab; Semitractor
- Vehicles: International 4000, 4100, 4200, 4300, 4400; International DuraStar; International RXT; International 3200, 3300
- Related: Ford F-650 Super Duty/F-750 Super Duty; International TerraStar; International 7300/7400, WorkStar, HV; International 8500/8600, TranStar, RH; International ProStar, LT; International LoneStar

Chronology
- Predecessor: International 4000 series (1989)
- Successor: International MV

The International DuraStar line, known as the 4000 series prior to 2008, is a line of medium-duty trucks produced by Navistar International from 2001 until 2018. Introduced as the successor to the International 4000 series of 1989–2001, the 4000 series was renamed the DuraStar in 2008. Developed as a Class 6-7 product range, the 4000/DuraStar was slotted below the 8000/TranStar regional-haul semitractor, with the Class 5 International TerraStar (2010–2015) serving as the smallest International conventional-cab product range.

The most distinctive features of the DuraStar are the "crescent shape" headlights and a distinctive "black spot" on the left side of the cab. Produced as both a semitractor and a straight/rigid truck, the 4000/DuraStar has been used in a wide variety of applications, including emergency vehicles, towing, flatbed trucks, and cargo box trucks. For bus use, the chassis is used in both cowled-chassis and cutaway-cab configurations for school bus and commercial applications.

The DuraStar was replaced by the International MV Series in 2018.

== Blue Diamond Truck alliance ==
In early 2001, Navistar entered into a 50/50 joint venture to produce commercial vehicles with Ford Motor Company, officially named Blue Diamond Truck, LLC. Under the agreement, Navistar assembled medium-duty trucks for both companies in its facility in General Escobedo, Mexico.

Though externally different, both Ford and Navistar model lines would share a common chassis; the medium-duty Ford F-Series (which had already entered production in 2000 at General Escobedo) shared its cab with the F-Series Super Duty line (F-250 through F-550). Though smaller F-Series vehicles used Navistar-supplied diesel engines, medium-duty Fords used engines supplied by Cummins and Caterpillar.

Serving as the debut line of the NGV (Next-Generation Vehicle) cab structure, the new International 4000 series sourced its engines from within the company, carrying over the T444E V8 and DT466E I6 diesel (later VT365, DT466, and MaxxForce engines) from the previous 4000 series (sharing other commercial-grade drivetrain components with Ford and other medium-duty vehicles).

In 2015, Ford ended its stake in the joint venture; as part of a redesign, production of medium-duty trucks was relocated from Mexico to Ohio (replacing the E-Series van), with Navistar continuing production at General Escobedo.

== 4000 series (2001–2007) ==
International 4000 series/DuraStar
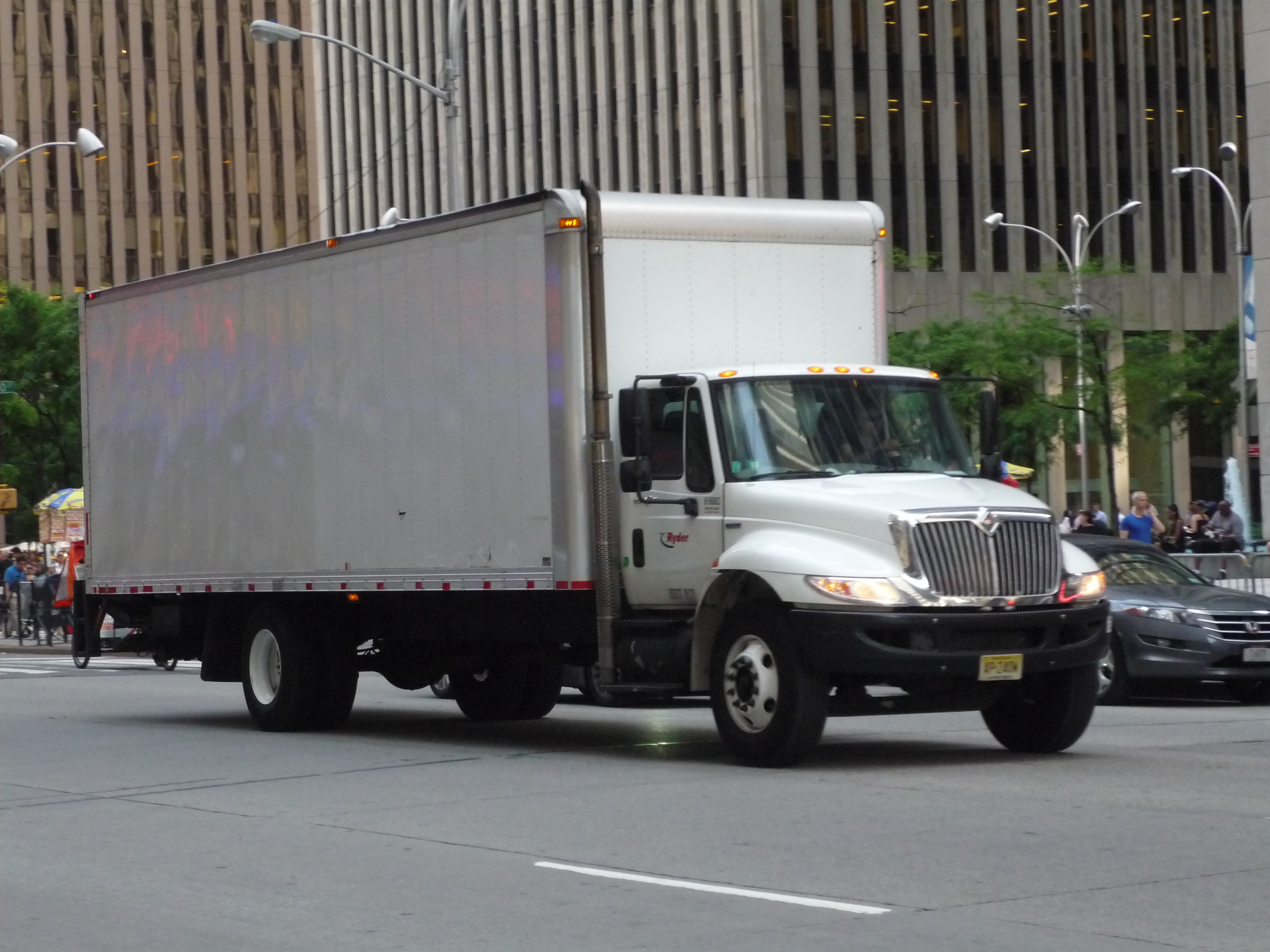
- International DuraStar 4400 with box-truck body

Overview
- Manufacturer: 2001-2009: Blue Diamond Truck, LLC (Ford/Navistar joint venture); 2009-2018: Navistar International
- Production: April 2001 –2018
- Model years: 2002–2018
- Assembly: General Escobedo, Mexico Springfield, Ohio

Body and chassis
- Class: Class 5-7
- Body style: Chassis cab: 2-door truck; 2-door extended-cab truck; 4-door crew-cab truck; Semi-tractor: 2-door truck
- Layout: 4x2 6x4

Powertrain
- Engine: International 4000 series: International VT365; International DT466; International DT530; International DT 570; International DuraStar: International MaxxForce 7; International MaxxForce DT; International MaxxForce 9; Cummins ISB6.7; Cummins L9; Cummins ISL 9

In February 2001, Navistar released its all-new 4000 series, dubbed as "High Performance Trucks". Developed in the Blue Diamond Truck joint venture with Ford, the 4000 series marked the first completely new truck line from International since the 1979 S series. Sharing its chassis with the medium-duty Ford F-Series (introduced in 2000), the International 4300/4400 retained the DT466 and DT530 diesels of their predecessors. For versions equipped with automatic transmissions, electronics for the engine and transmissions were retuned to optimize throttle and shifting response, to increase both performance and fuel economy. To increase forward visibility, the size of the windshield was increased by over 60%, with additional attention paid to improvements in ventilation.

At the launch of the 4000 series, the standard 4300 and higher-GVWR 4400 were introduced as replacements for the previous 4900 model series. In 2002, the lower-GVWR 4200 was introduced as the replacement for the 4700 series, marking the introduction of the VT365 engine. In 2006, the 4100 was introduced, expanding the model line into the Class 5 segment; the model was discontinued a single year of production. The 4200, 4300, and 4400 were produced in both a standard and low-profile frame. The 4400 was also produced in a semitractor; sitting 4 inches higher than the chassis truck, the 4400 tractor was the only version offered with the DT570 engine as an option.

International 4000 Specifications (2001-2007)
Model Designation	Engine	Transmission	Brakes	Axle configuration	Wheelbase
4100 (Class 5)	VT365 6.0L V8 230 hp	Allison 1000- HS 6-speed automatic	Hydraulic	4x2 Low Profile	140–217 in (3,556–5,512 mm)
4200 (Class 6)	VT365 6.0L V8 175-230 hp	Fuller 5-speed manual; Fuller 6-speed manual; Allison 2000 5-speed automatic; Allison 2400 5-speed automatic	Hydraulic Air	4x2 4x2 Low Profile (4200LP)	128–254 in (3,251–6,452 mm)
4300 (Class 6)	DT466 7.6L I6 210 hp 255 hp	Fuller 6-speed manual; Fuller 7-speed manual; Allison 2000 5-speed automatic; Allison 2400 5-speed automatic; Allison MD3060/MD3560 automatic	Hydraulic Air	4x2 4x2 Low Profile (4300LP)	128–254 in (3,251–6,452 mm)
4400 (Class 6-7)	DT466(HT) 7.6L I6; 225-300 hp: DT530 8.7L I6; 275-330 hp: DT570 9.3L I6; 310 hp	Fuller 6-speed manual; Fuller 7-speed manual; Fuller 10-speed manual; Allison 2000 5-speed automatic; Allison 2400 5-speed automatic; Allison MD3060/MD3560 automatic; Allison 3000 close-ratio 5-speed automatic; Allison 3000 close-ratio 6-speed automatic	Hydraulic Air (standard on 4400 tractor)	4x2 4x2 Low Profile (4400LP) 6x4 4x2 semitractor	Straight truck:140–254 in (3,556–6,452 mm) Tractor: 128–189 in (3,251–4,801 mm)

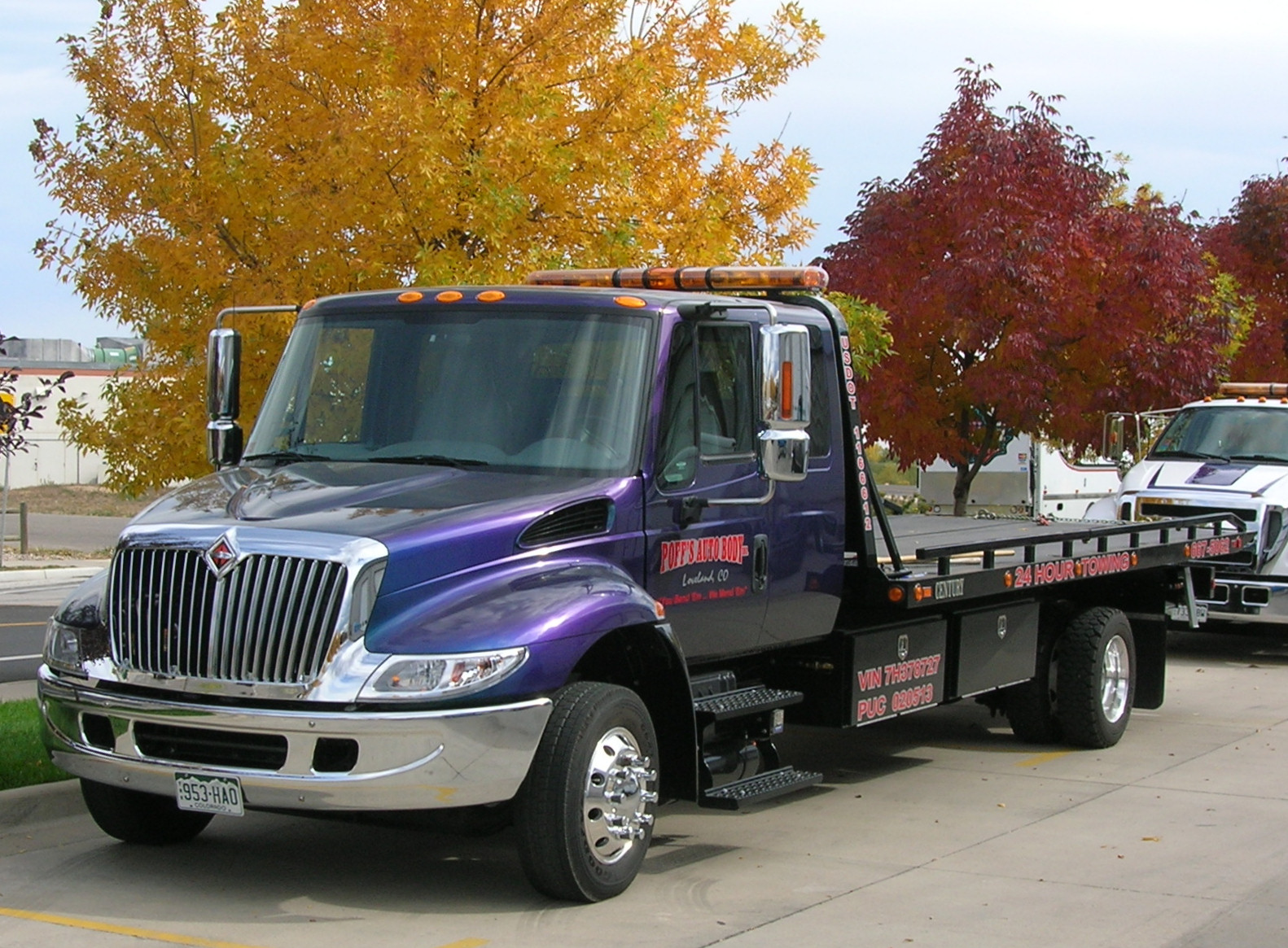
International 4200LP extended-cab

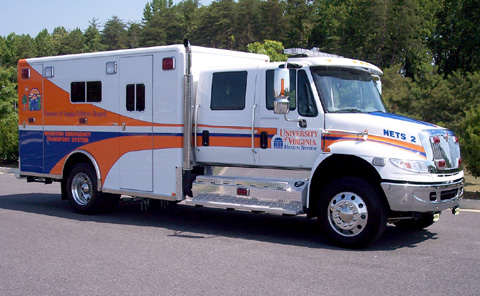
International 4400 crew cab

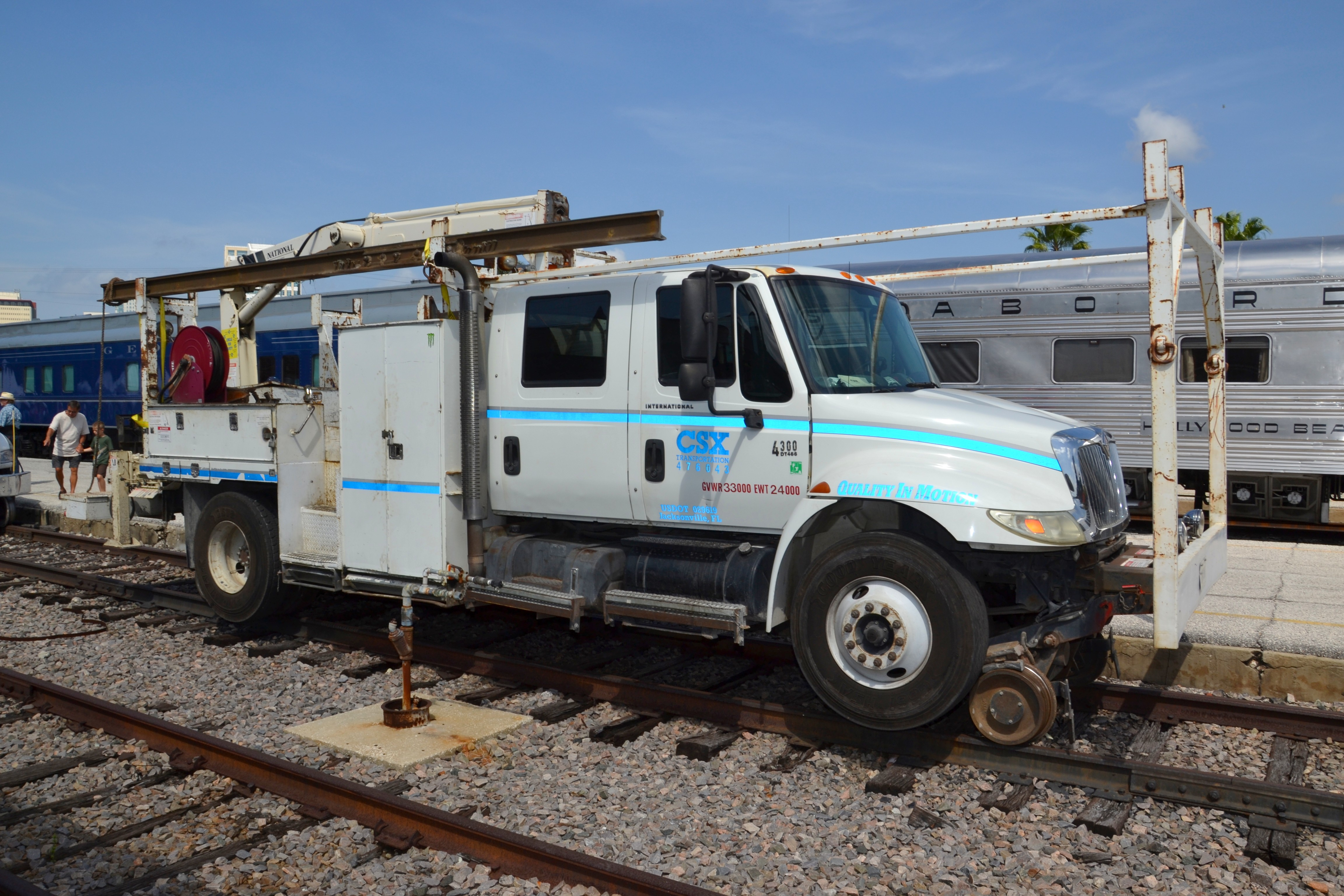
International 4300 crew cab

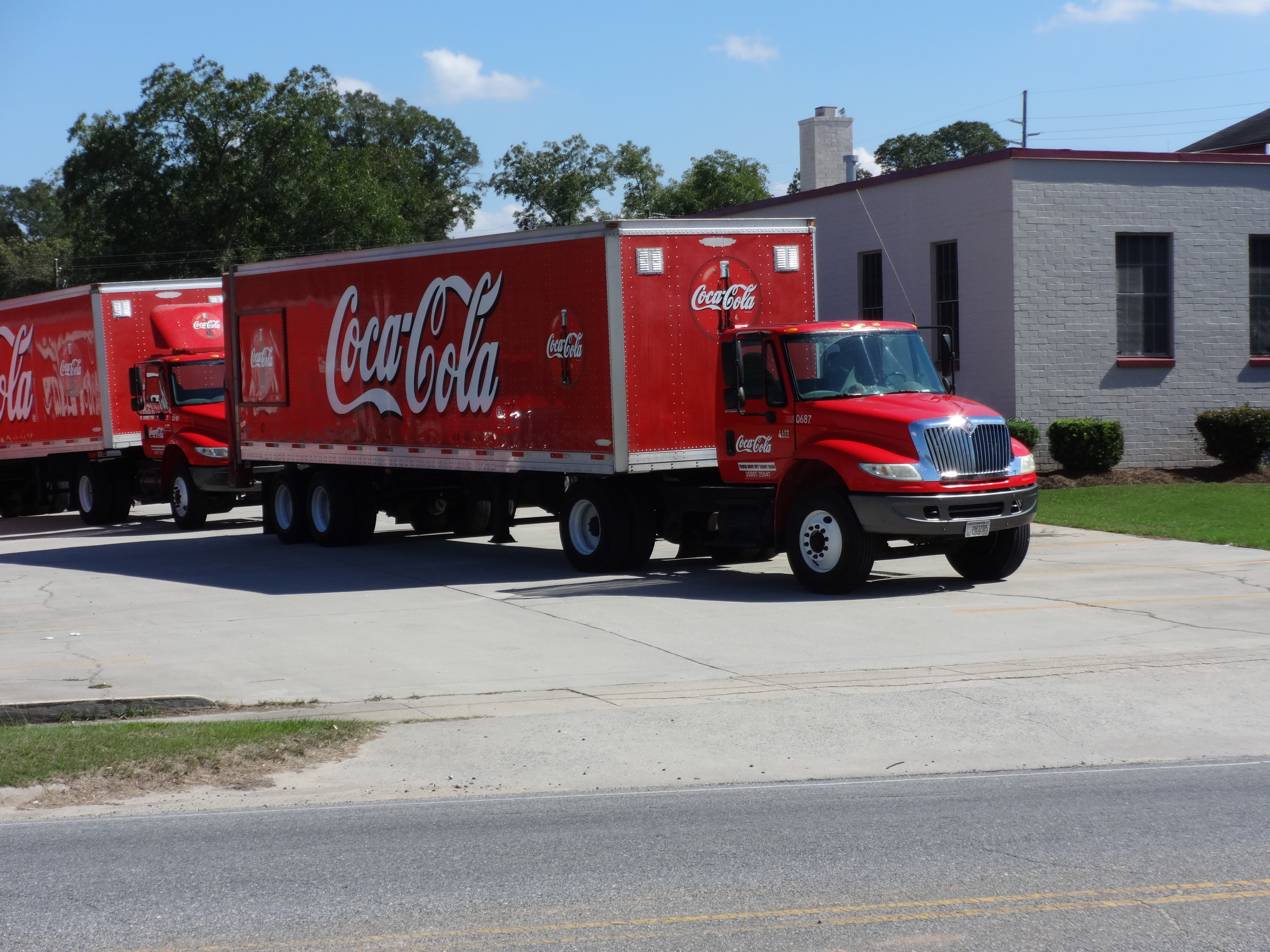
International 4400 semitractor

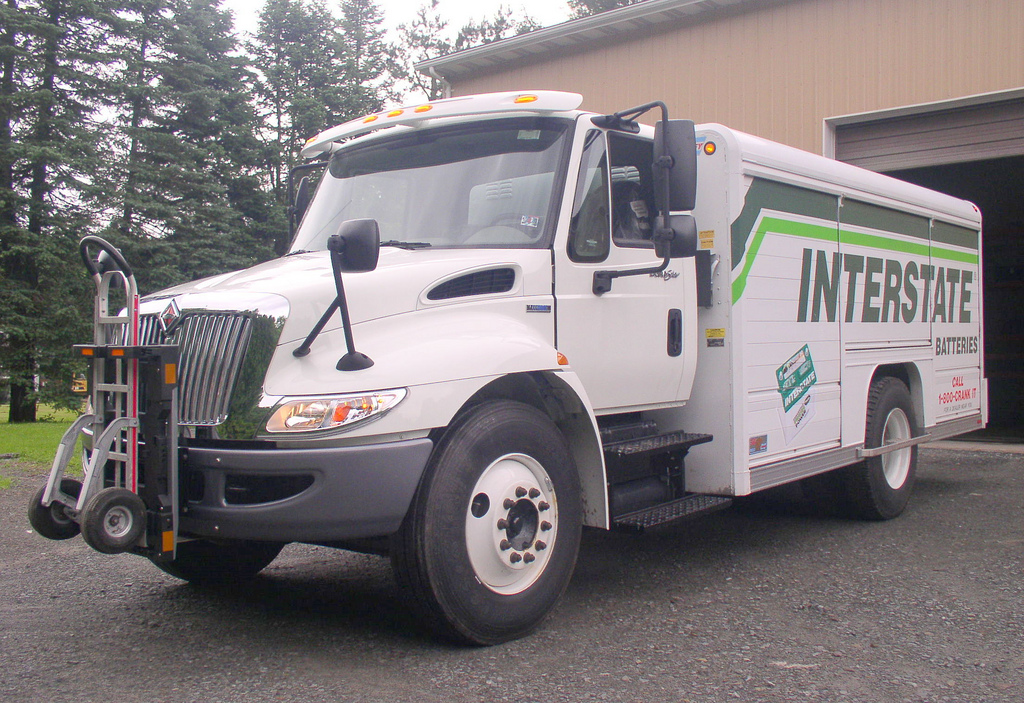
International DuraStar 4300

== DuraStar (2008–2018) ==
For 2008, coinciding with the introduction of the International ProStar and International LoneStar, Navistar revised the branding of its truck model lines. In line with nomenclature previously used by International Harvester, truck lines adopted a "xxxxStar" naming scheme, with the 4000 series adopting the DuraStar model name. This change was completed in its entirety for the 2010 model year. In another revision, to comply with 2007 emissions regulations, the powertrain lineup underwent extensive revision, with the 6.0L VT365 V8 replaced by the 6.4L MaxxForce 7 V8. The DT inline-6 engine family underwent revisions as well, with the DT466 becoming the MaxxForce DT and the DT570 becoming the MaxxForce 9, adopting four-valve cylinder heads and exhaust gas recirculation to reduce emissions.

International brand revision
Before revision	After 2008 revision
CF (Ford LCF)	CityStar
4000	DuraStar
Paystar 5000 (unchanged)
7000	WorkStar
8000	TranStar
ProStar
N/A	LoneStar
9000i (unchanged)

While each International model series retained the use of numerical model codes, after the model revision, their usage was highly downplayed, largely relegated to places such as the build plate for the vehicle. Externally, International replaced the numerical series and engine identification with script identifying the model series.

In 2010, the International TerraStar model line was introduced, effectively replacing the discontinued 4100 model line. Sharing the cab of the DuraStar, the TerraStar sat on a lower frame and wore its own hood.

=== Powertrain revision ===
For 2015 production, the DuraStar began to phase in Cummins ISB6.7 diesel engines as an option, slotted in between the MaxxForce 7 and MaxxForce DT, with the ISL as an option alongside the MaxxForce 9. Although Cummins ISX engines had been offered in International Class 8 trucks, the expansion marked the introduction of the first selective catalytic reduction diesel engine for a medium-duty Navistar vehicle.

After 2016, Navistar ended production of the MaxxForce 7, MaxxForce DT, and MaxxForce 9 engines, with the ISB and ISL9 engines becoming the sole engine offerings of the DuraStar.

== Variants ==
The International DuraStar shares its cab design with several International product lines, including: the TerraStar Class 5 medium-duty truck, the 7000/WorkStar severe-service trucks (renamed the International HV), the 8000/TranStar regional-haul semitractor (renamed the International RH), the ProStar aerodynamic long-haul semi-tractor (renamed the International LT), and the LoneStar semitractor.

=== Bus ===
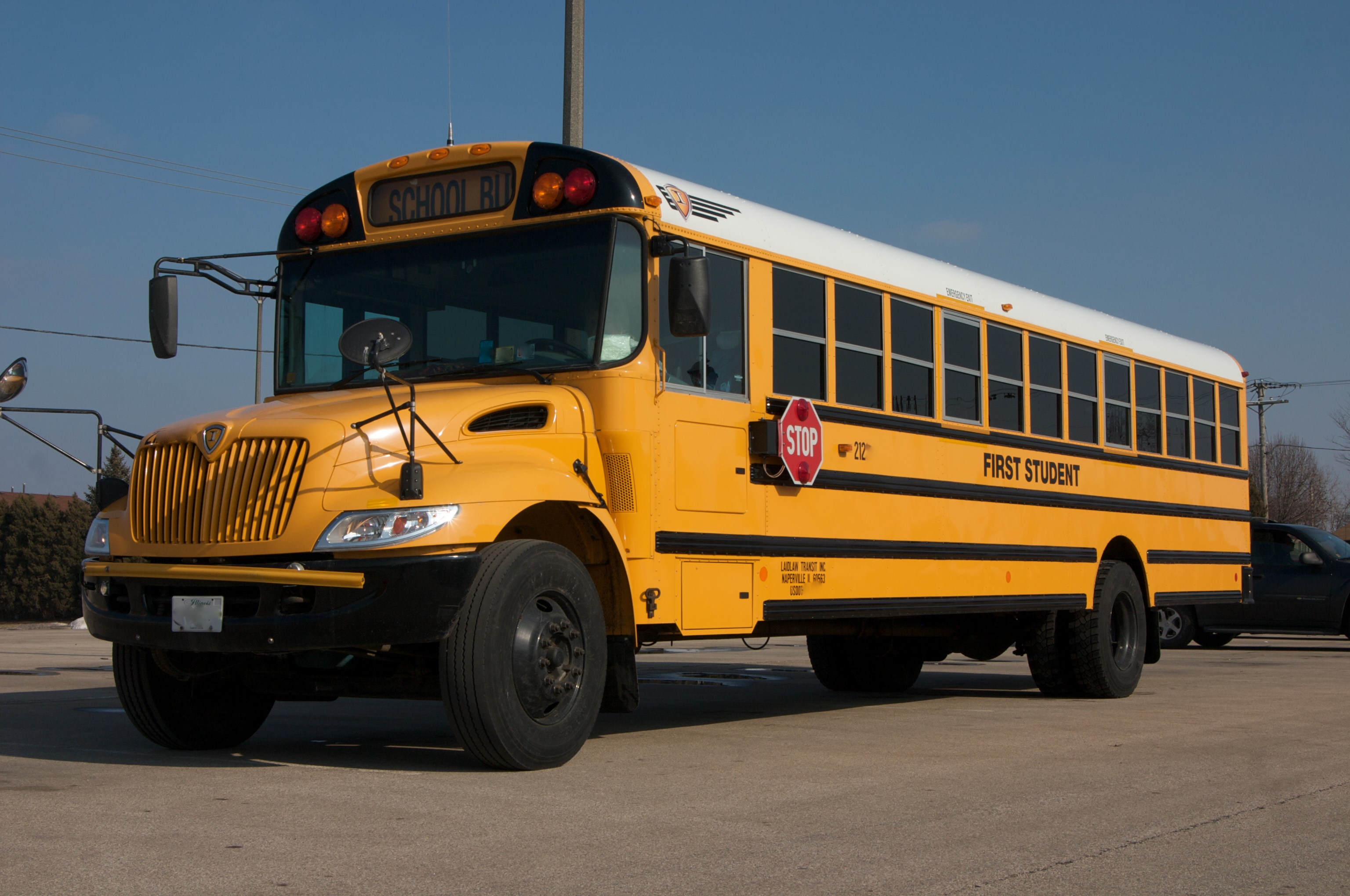
International 3300 bus chassis with school bus body

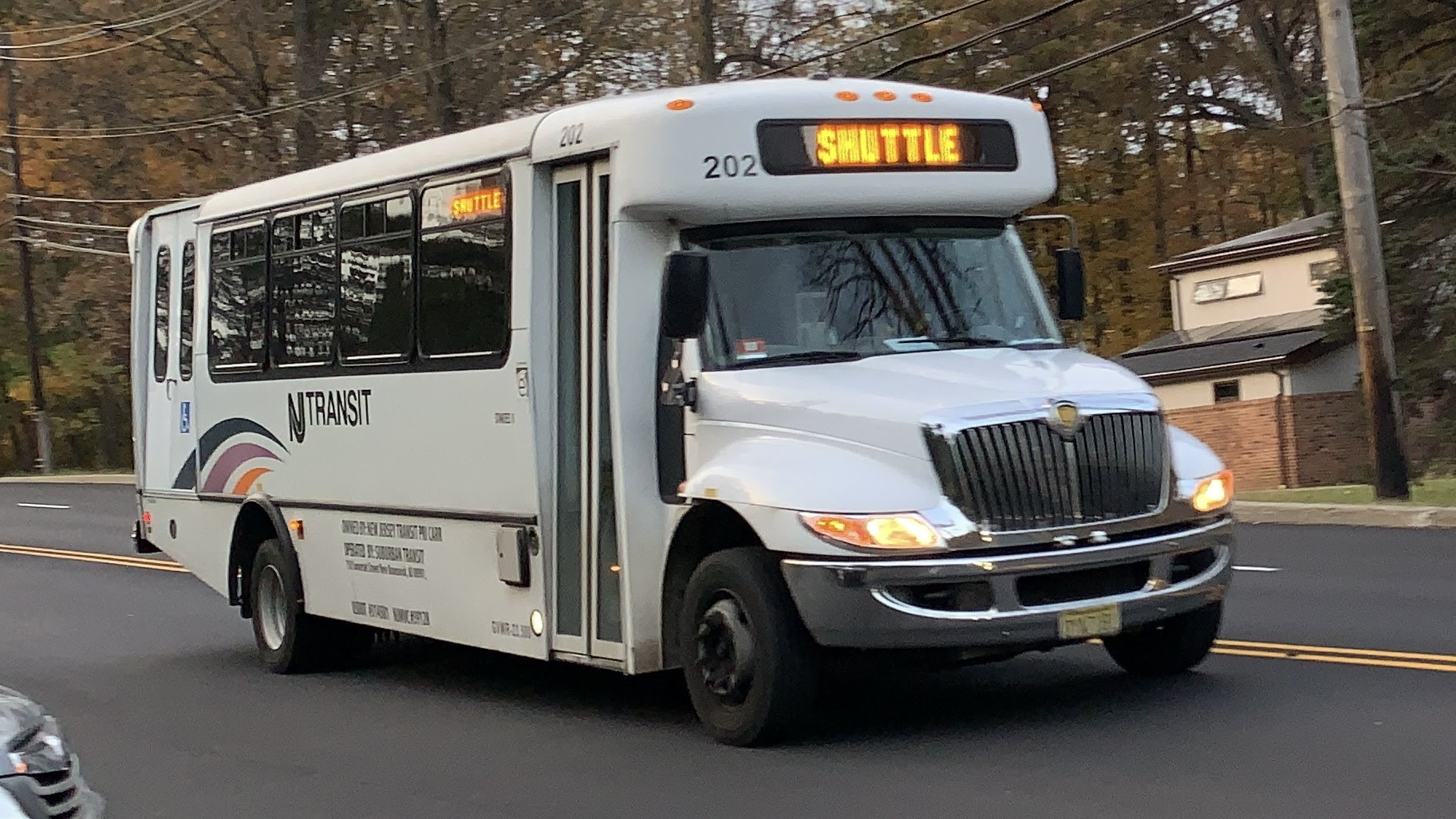
NJ Transit 202 (2014 International 3200)

Like the 4000 series before it, the DuraStar served as a popular platform for bus manufacturers, with two configurations sold for bus production. The International 3200 was a cutaway-cab chassis, and the International 3300 was a cowled chassis. The former was sold primarily for commercial applications while the latter was sold nearly exclusively to Navistar subsidiary IC Bus, for both school bus and commercial applications. Production of the 3300 ended in 2023, five years after its truck counterpart ended production in 2018.

=== Diesel–electric hybrid trucks ===
In 2007, Navistar International became the first American truck manufacturer to produce a diesel-electric truck, with the International DuraStar Hybrid. International Truck and Engine teamed with the Hybrid Truck Users Forum (HTUF), a consortium of utility industry customers, Eaton Corporation, the US Federal Government and the Calstart organization to assist with the cost of bringing the technology to market. It also provided direct customer feedback and support.

=== Pickup truck ===
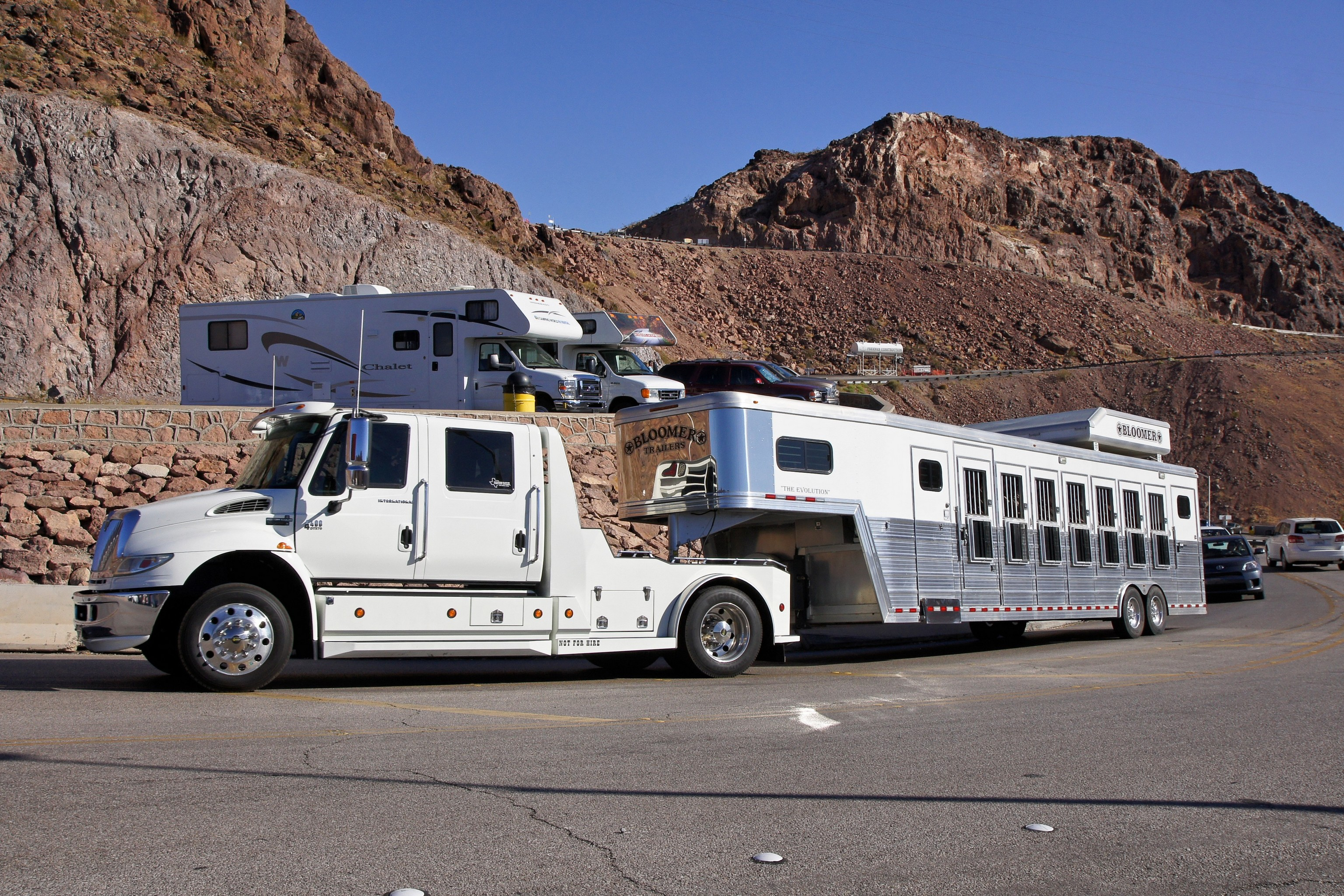
International 4400/DT570 with utility bed, International RXT is configured similar (with pickup-truck bed)

From 2005 to 2008, International sold a factory-produced crew-cab pickup truck variant of the 4000 series. Named the International RXT (RXT=Recreational Extreme Truck), at 272 inches long, the truck was the longest-length pickup truck ever produced for sale in North America. Unlike the 7000 series-derived CXT, the RXT was rear-wheel drive, marketed towards customers with large RV, boat, and horse trailers; both trucks source a pickup truck bed from the Ford F-350 Super Duty. Derived from the 4200, the RXT was powered by a 230 hp VT365 V8 and an Allison 2200 transmission.

In 2008, following lower than expected sales, the XT series was withdrawn.

== See also ==
- Ford F-650/F-750 Super Duty - Ford medium-duty trucks produced by Blue Diamond Truck, LLC
