= Thomas Saf-T-Liner Conventional =

Type C Thomas school bus model

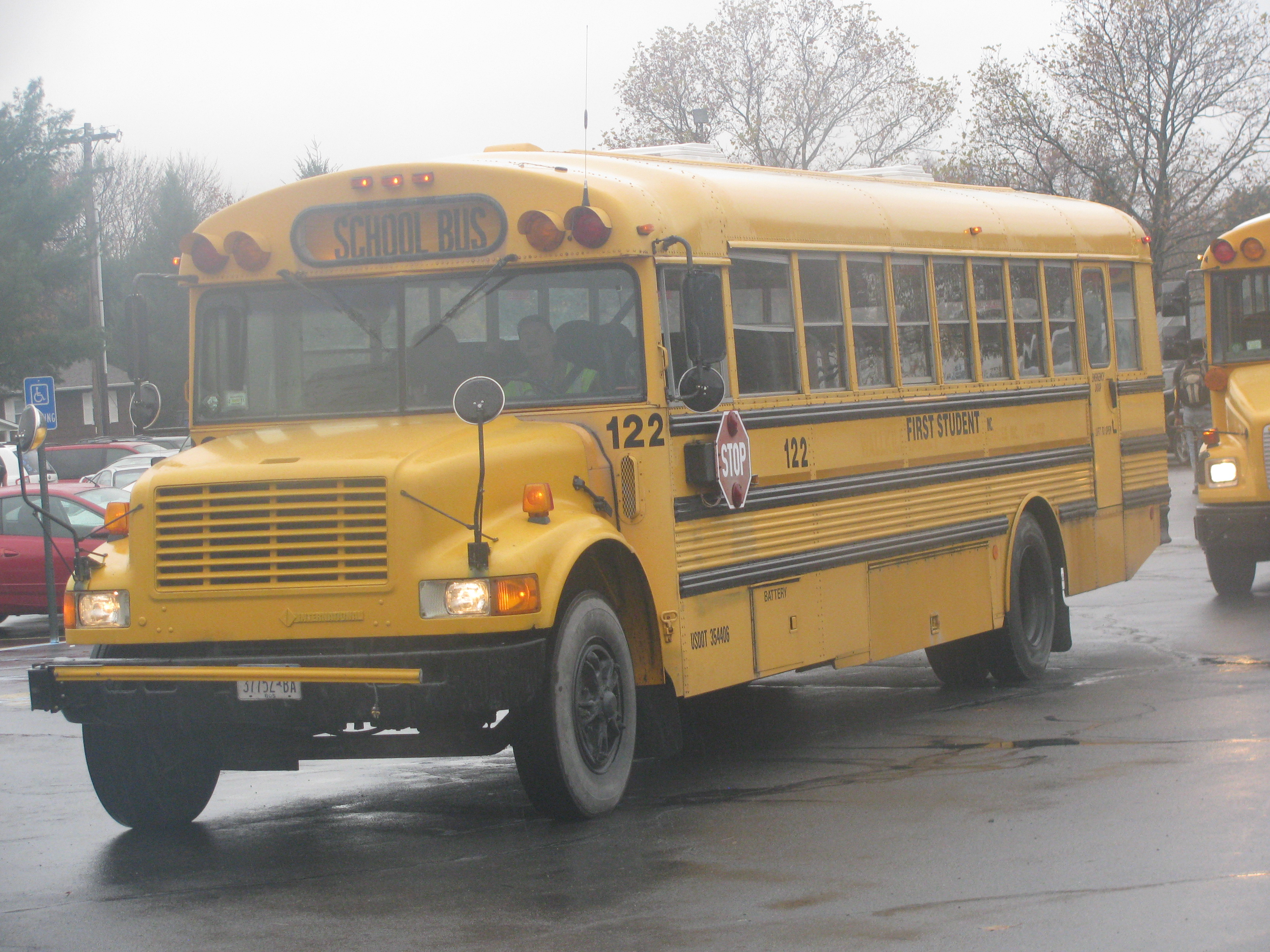

Overview
- Manufacturer: Thomas Built Buses (Freightliner)
- Production: 1972–2002
- Assembly: United States: High Point, North Carolina (Thomas High Point Plant); Canada: Woodstock, Ontario; Mexico: Monterrey, Nuevo León

Body and chassis
- Class: Type C (conventional)
- Body style: Cowled chassis: School bus; Commercial bus
- Chassis: Dodge D-300 (1972–1977); Ford B series (1972–1998); Freightliner FS-65 (1997–2006); Chevrolet/GMC B series (1972–1991); International Loadstar 1703/1803 (1972–1978); International S-1700/S-1800 (1979–1989); International 3800 (1989–2002)
- Related: Thomas Saf-T-Liner FS-65

Dimensions
- Width: 96 in (2,438 mm)
- Curb weight: 18,000–35,000 lb (8,165–15,876 kg) (GVWR)

Chronology
- Successor: Thomas Saf-T-Liner FS-65; Thomas Saf-T-Liner C2

The Thomas Saf-T-Liner Conventional (often shortened to Thomas Conventional) is a bus body manufactured by Thomas Built Buses from 1972 to 2002. Produced primarily as a yellow school bus, the model line is also produced for commercial use and other specialty configurations.

Thomas manufactures the Conventional in High Point, North Carolina, while other Conventionals were built in Woodstock, Ontario and Monterrey, Mexico. The FS-65 used for the Saf-T-Liner Conventional was built in Gaffney, South Carolina, which was opened in 1995. In late 2006, The final "1972-style" Conventional was a FS-65, and was delivered on December 13, 2006 to Maryland-based O'Brien Bus Service, Inc.

== Background ==
In 1936, Thomas Car Works secured part of a bid to produce 500 school bus bodies for North Carolina. As the company was only financially able to acquire materials for 200 bodies, North Carolina split the bid between Thomas and Hackney Brothers. Dependent on length, Thomas offered wood-bodied school buses for $195 to $225. Following the completion of its second school bus bid in 1937, the company focused nearly all production on school bus bodies. In what is a long tradition that continues to the present day, Thomas remains the primary supplier of school buses to North Carolina.

During World War II, Thomas Car Works was active in war production, shifting from buses to bodies for the GMC CCKW 2½-ton 6x6 truck. After World War II, Thomas Car Works returned to vehicle production, concentrating nearly entirely on school buses. In 1957, Thomas Car Works introduced the "Saf-T-Liner" trade name for the first time, becoming full-time in 1972.

== Design history ==
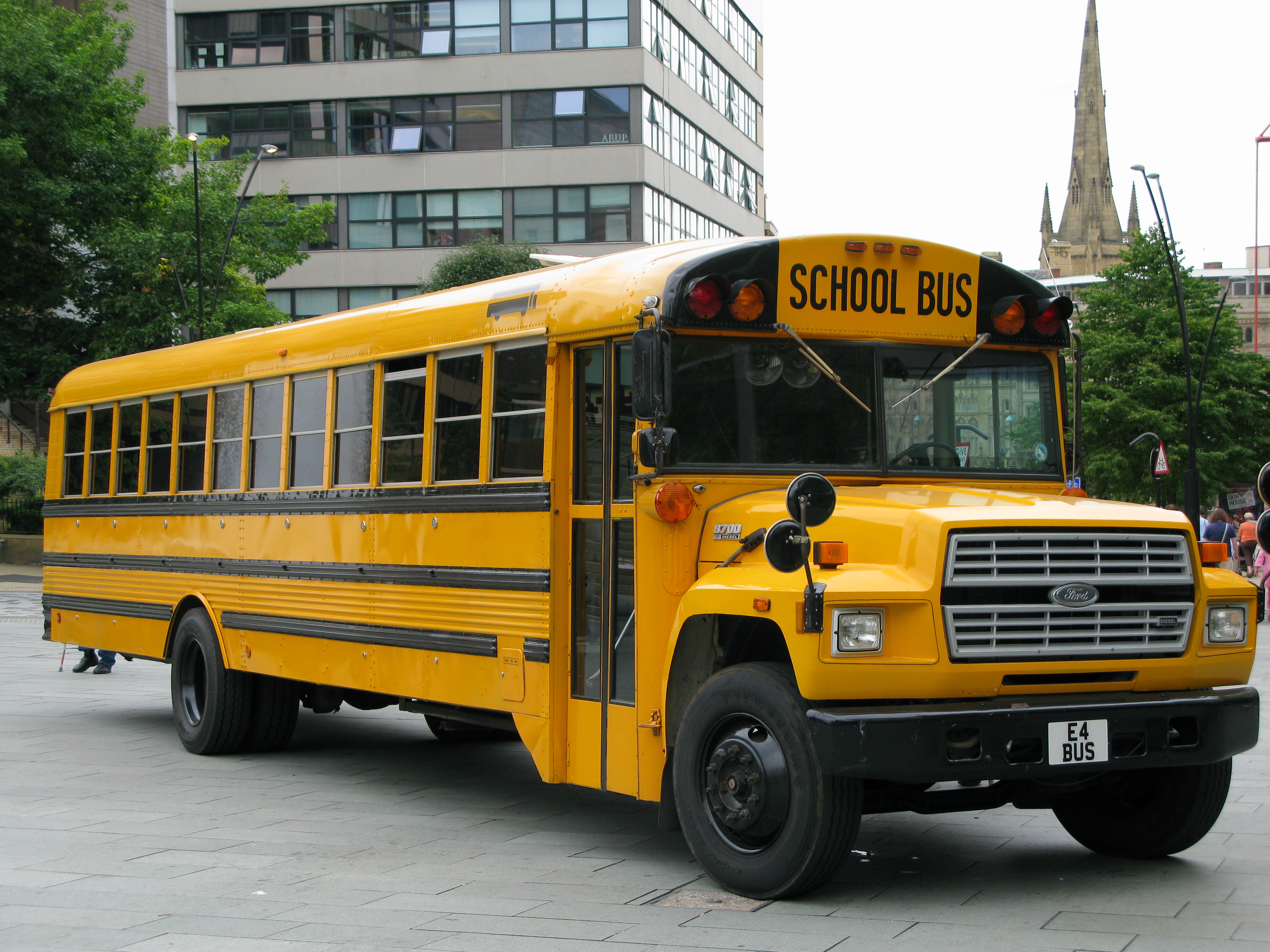
1985–1994 Thomas Saf-T-Liner on a Ford chassis

As Thomas Car Works had ended its involvement with streetcars since World War II, the new generation of company leaders chose a new name for the company tied closer to its current product lines; in 1972, Perley A. Thomas Car Works was renamed Thomas Built Buses, Inc (used in its emblems and marketing material since the 1940s and 1950s).

Also in that year, the Conventional body underwent a major redesign, becoming the Saf-T-Liner Conventional. Along with extending the rub rails completely around the body, the front and rear roof caps were flattened (to accommodate 8-lamp warning systems), and the windshield was enlarged. Following the addition of safety upgrades to comply with safety mandates in 1977, the Saf-T-Liner body saw use in the Conventional through the end of 2006; in modified form, it remains in use with the EFX and HDX (and resized to fit the Minotour).

For 1989, Thomas Built Buses introduced the Thomas Vista as its own semi-forward control bus. The Vista originally used a GM chassis, that was later replaced by a International 3600 chassis for 1992, and discontinued in 1998.

In May 1996, Thomas unveiled the Saf-T-Liner FS-65, using a Freightliner FS-65 chassis and a Saf-T-Liner body. The first completely new school bus chassis introduced since the 1980 redesign of the Ford B-Series, the Freightliner Freightliner FS-65 was scheduled for mid-1996 production; the first Thomas FS-65 bus rolled off the assembly line in January 1997.

During its production run, the FS-65 chassis saw relatively few changes. After 2002, all Freightliner FS-65 chassis wore Thomas bodies. The FS-65 is easily distinguishable from a regular Saf-T-Liner by its 4-piece windshield; the standard Saf-T-Liner Conventional used a smaller, 2-piece windshield. By the end of 2002, the International 3800 chassis were dropped after the 2003 model year, leaving the FS-65 as a sole chassis for Thomas bodies.

In 2004, the Thomas Saf-T-Liner C2 was introduced as the successor to the Conventional and the FS-65. Sold alongside the C2, the FS-65 remained in production into the 2007 model year. In November 2004, Thomas delivered its first Saf-T-Liner C2, the successor of the FS-65, to Durham School Services.

On December 13, 2006, Thomas delivered its final Saf-T-Liner Conventional to O'Brien Bus Service of College Park, Maryland, owned by Gary O'Brien. The 2006 discontinuation of the Saf-T-Liner FS-65 marked the end of the FL-Series (alongside its severe-service variants), as medium-duty production ended after 2004.

== Chassis Suppliers ==
Thomas Saf-T-Liner Conventional Chassis Suppliers
Manufacturer	Chrysler Corporation	Ford Motor Company Freightliner	General Motors	International Harvester Navistar International
Model Name	Dodge D-Series	Ford B600/B700/B800; Freightliner FS-65	Chevrolet/GMC B-series	International Loadstar; International S-1700/S-1800; International 3800
Years Available	1972–1977	1972–1998; 1997–2006	1972–1991	1972–1978 (Loadstar); 1979–1989 (S-Series); 1989–2002 (3800)
Image				
Notes	Dodge ended production of school bus chassis after 1977.	See also: Thomas Saf-T-Liner FS-65	After 1991, GM B-Series supplied only to Blue Bird.	

== Comparable products ==
- Blue Bird Conventional and the CV200
- Corbeil Conventional
- Carpenter Classic
- Gillig Coach Conventional
- Superior Pioneer
- Ward/AmTran Volunteer/CS and the International IC
- Wayne Lifeguard
