= Blue Bird Conventional =

Type C Blue Bird school bus model

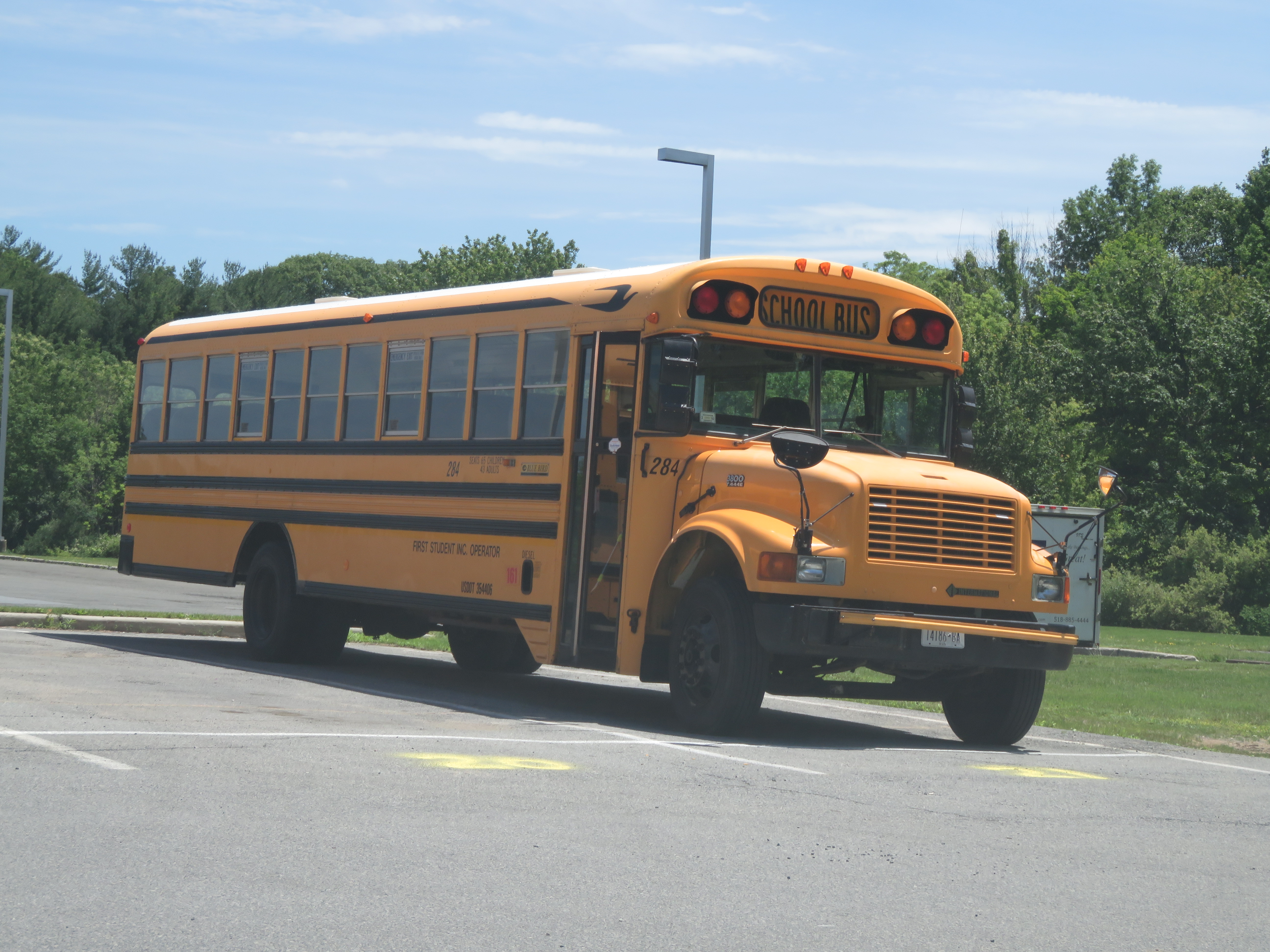

Overview
- Manufacturer: Blue Bird Corporation
- Production: c.1957–2004
- Assembly: United States: Fort Valley, Georgia (Blue Bird Body Company; main plant) Other plants: LaFayette, Georgia (Blue Bird North Georgia; 1984–2004); Mount Pleasant, Iowa (Blue Bird Midwest; 1962–2002); Buena Vista, Virginia (Blue Bird East; 1972–1992); Canada: Brantford, Ontario (Canadian Blue Bird; 1958–2004); Saint-Lin-Laurentides, Quebec (Blue Bird Québec; 1975–1982); Mexico: Monterrey, Nuevo León (Blue Bird de Mexico; 1995–2001); Guatemala: Guatemala City (Blue Bird Central America; 1965–198?)

Body and chassis
- Class: Type C (conventional)
- Body style: Cowled chassis: School bus; Commercial bus
- Chassis: Dodge D-300 (1962–1977); Ford B series (1962–1998, 2002); Freightliner FS-65 (1997–2002); Chevrolet/GMC B series (1966–2003); International Loadstar 1703/1803 (1962–1978); International S-1700/S-1800 (1978–1989); International 3800 (1989–2004)
- Related: Blue Bird CV200

Dimensions
- Width: 96 in (2.4 m)
- Height: 122–128 in (3.1–3.3 m)
- Curb weight: up to 33,000 lb (14,969 kg)

Chronology
- Successor: Blue Bird CV200 (Chevrolet/GMC); Blue Bird SBCV (International); Blue Bird Vision

The Blue Bird Conventional (also known as the Blue Bird SBCV) is a school bus that is manufactured and marketed by Blue Bird Corporation in North America from 1957 until 2004, when it was replaced by the Vision. Unlike the Vision, the Conventional were sold with chassis from various companies like International and General Motors. While it is sold primarily in a school bus configuration, the Blue Bird Conventional is also offered with various commercial and specialty seating and design configurations.

The Conventional is produced by Blue Bird Corporation in its Fort Valley manufacturing facility alongside its All American product line. The model was also produced at almost all Blue Bird's manufacturing facilities, including Blue Bird Canada in Brantford.

== Background ==
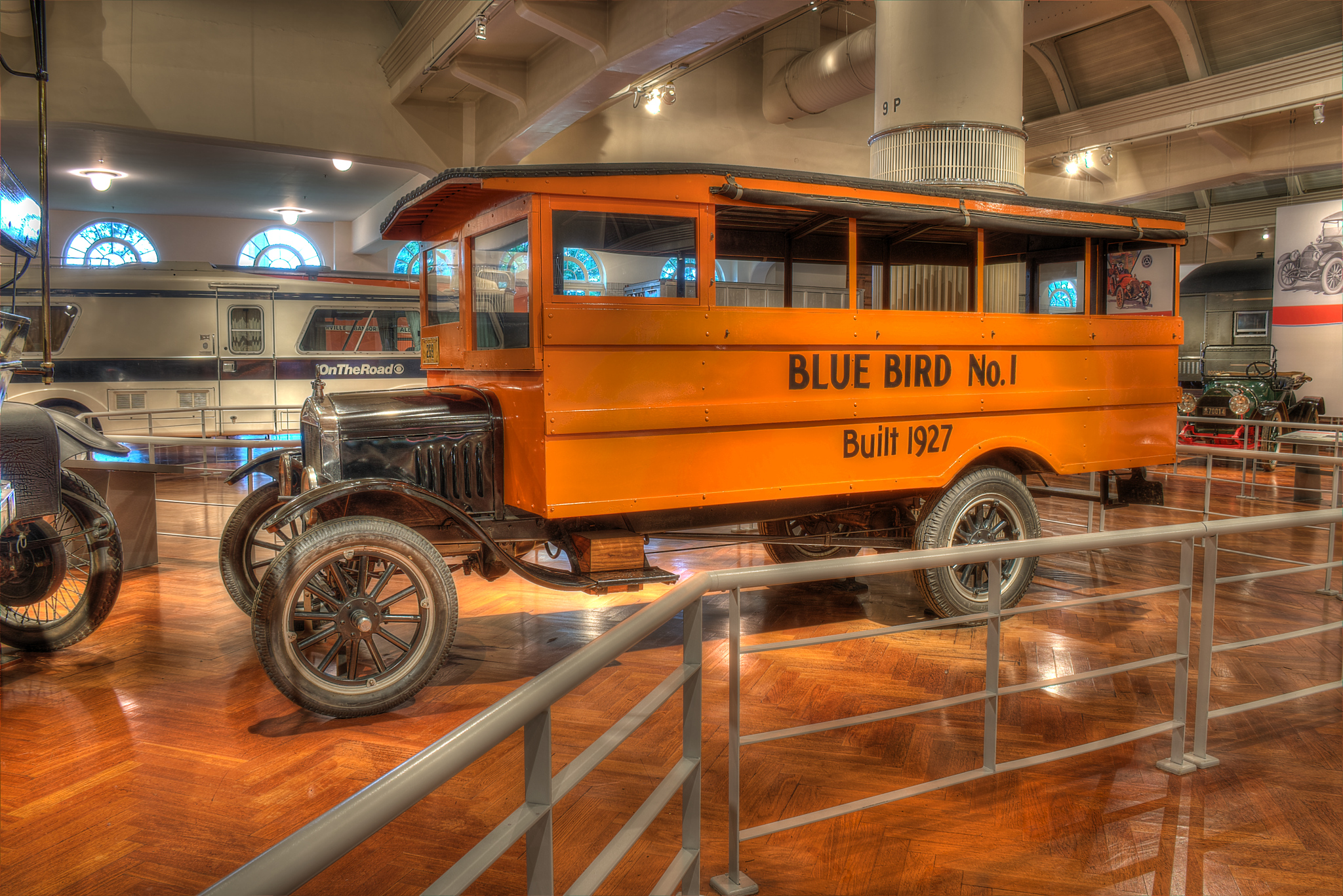
"Blue Bird Number 1", built on a 1927 Ford Model TT chassis. Donated to The Henry Ford Museum in 2008.

Completed in 1927, the first bus completed by A.L. Luce was sold to a customer and put into use as a school bus. Following the establishment of Blue Bird Body Company in 1932, the bus became retroactively known as Blue Bird "Number One". In 1946, the bus was reacquired by the Luce family; as part of the restoration, the body was placed on a Ford Model TT chassis, undergoing a second restoration in the 1970s.

In 2008, Blue Bird "Number One" was donated to the Henry Ford Museum, marking the 100th anniversary of the Model T Ford and the 80th anniversary of its construction. Alongside the 1948 Blue Bird All American, a replica of Blue Bird Number One sits on the Blue Bird factory floor in Fort Valley.

== Design history ==
In 1957, Blue Bird introduced the Conventional, when the current Vision and the All American continue to use this body. This Blue Bird model has a complete body redesign like the All American, including a higher roofline and flatter body sides; with several revisions over the years; the current Blue Bird Vision and All American continue to use this body. As an option, a "high-headroom" body was introduced, raising interior height to 77 inches.

At the time of its introduction, the Conventional was manufactured in Fort Valley, Georgia, along with the All American. To expand Blue Bird's Conventional, the company opened new facilities in Brantford, Ontario and Mount Pleasant, Iowa in 1958 and 1962. At the beginning of the 1960s, Blue Bird stood as the fourth-largest manufacturer of school buses in the United States. To accommodate the added demand, the Luce brothers added several production facilities to supplement the Fort Valley, Georgia plant.

At the beginning of the decade, Blue Bird introduced its roofline brand emblem, becoming the first bus manufacturer to do so. In 1962, Blue Bird introduced a panoramic windshield design, used on the All American through 2013 (and still on use on the Vision). In 1965, the company launched bus assembly outside of North America for the first time, opening Blue Bird Central America in Guatemala. Unlike Blue Bird's facilities in North America, the Blue Bird Conventional uses locally sourced chassis such as the Toyota FA.

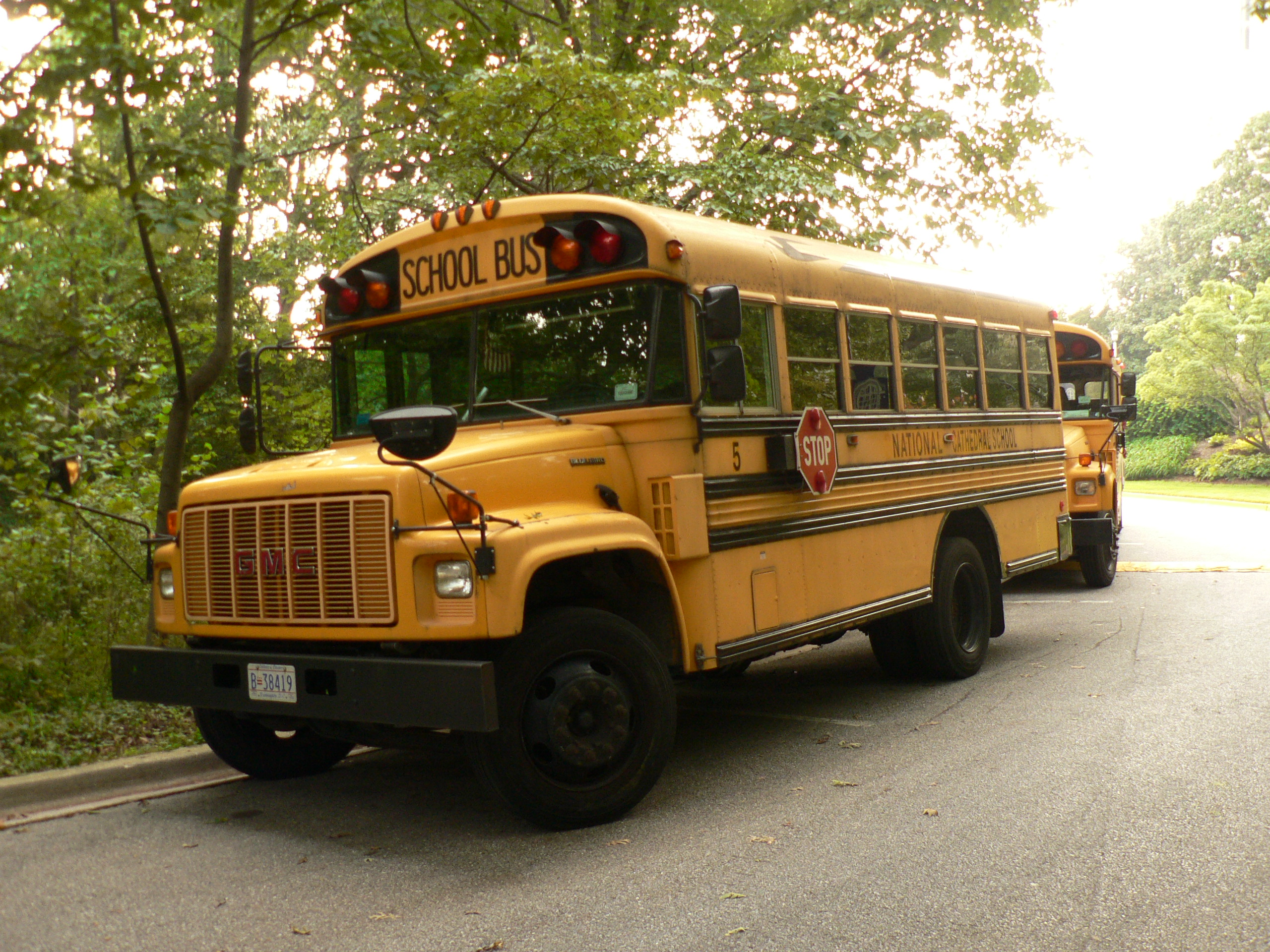
A Blue Bird CV200 with GMC chassis

In 1991, Blue Bird entered a supply and marketing agreement with General Motors; for the next 10 years, Blue Bird became the exclusive manufacturer to body the then-new GMT530 cowled chassis, naming as the Blue Bird CV200. Under the agreement, the GM B-7 (external code name for the GMT530-based bus chassis) became standard equipment for all Blue Bird Conventionals, although International and Ford (later, Freightliner) chassis were allowed as options.

In 2001, Blue Bird also entered a supply agreement with the Ford Motor Company, several Blue Bird Conventional bodies were fitted on Ford F-750 chassis as a potential replacement. As Ford never completed a supply agreement with Blue Bird, these would become the very last Ford-chassis school buses ever built. The 2002 Blue Bird Conventional on a Ford chassis features a Safety View™ Vision Panel ahead of the entry door, which was later used on the Vision.

After Blue Bird failed to renew its supply agreement with GM in 2002, General Motors was effectively shut out of full-size chassis production, as both body manufacturers competing with Blue Bird were wholly owned by the largest competitors of GM in the medium-duty segment.

=== Blue Bird SBCV (2004–2008) ===
In 2003, Blue Bird introduced the Blue Bird Vision for 2004 production, marking the first cowled-chassis school bus to use a proprietary chassis (not shared with a medium-duty truck). When the Vision introduced, the Conventional remained solely on Navistar chassis, becoming the SBCV for the 2005 model year. The SBCV remained in production into the 2008 model year, when it was discontinued.

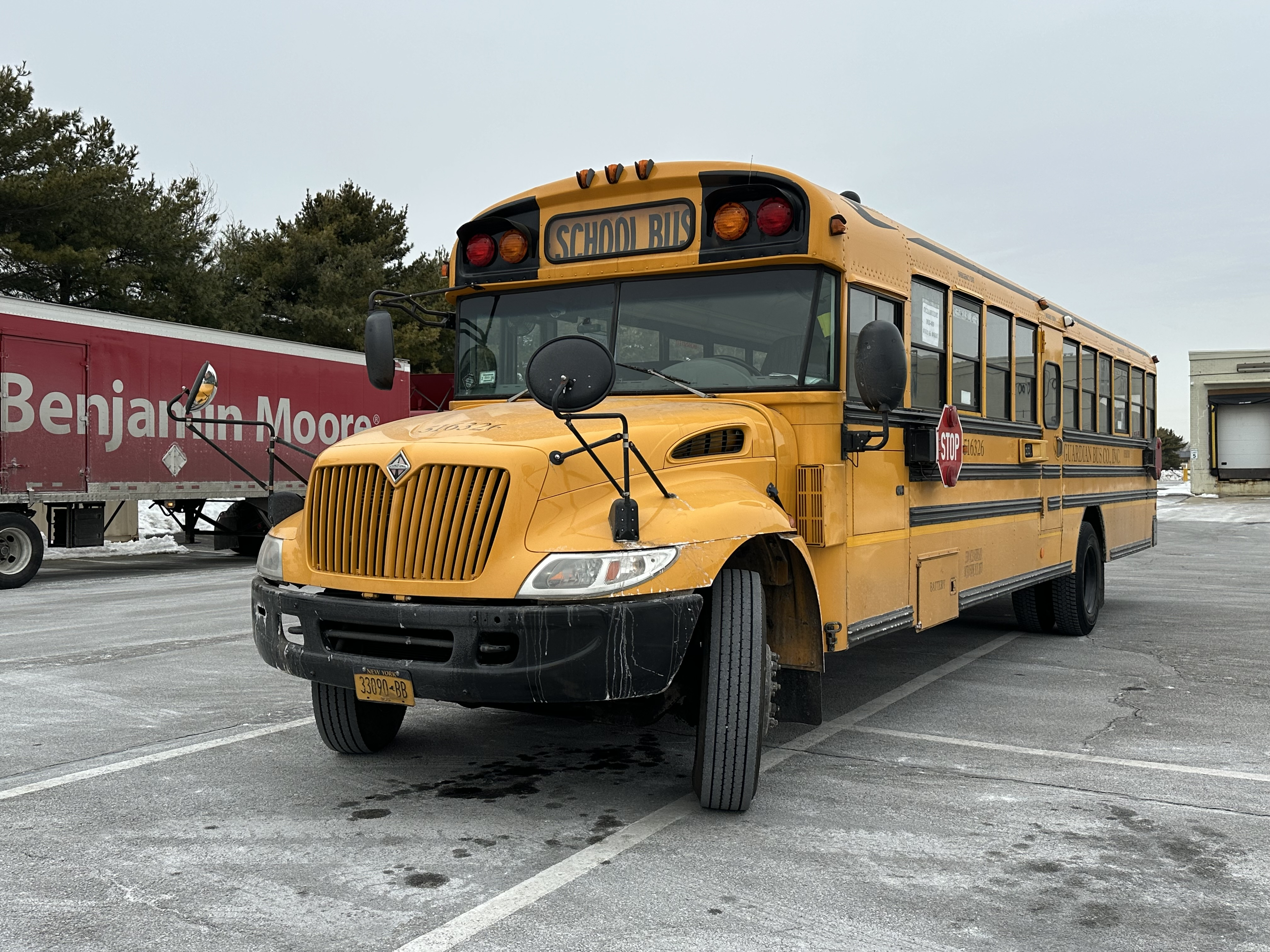
2007 Blue Bird SBCV

== Chassis Suppliers ==
Blue Bird Conventional Chassis Suppliers
Manufacturer	Chrysler Corporation	Ford Motor Company Freightliner	General Motors	International Harvester Navistar International
Model Name	Dodge S-Series	Ford B600/B700/B800; Freightliner FS-65	Chevrolet/GMC B-series	International Loadstar; International S-1700/S-1800; International 3800
Years Available	1957–1977	1957–1998; 1997–2002	1966–2002	1961–1978 (Loadstar); 1979–1989 (S-Series); 1989–2004 (3800)
Image				
Notes	Dodge ended production of school bus chassis after 1977	Freightliner chassis only supplied to Thomas after 2001.	Known as the Blue Bird CV200 from 1991 to 2003.	Known as the Blue Bird SBCV from 2004 to 2008, using a International 3300 chassis.

== Comparable products ==
- Corbeil Conventional
- Carpenter Classic
- Gillig Coach Conventional
- Superior Pioneer
- Thomas Saf-T-Liner Conventional and the FS-65
- Ward/AmTran Volunteer/CS and the International IC
- Wayne Lifeguard
