= Thomas Saf-T-Liner FS-65 =

Type C Thomas school bus model

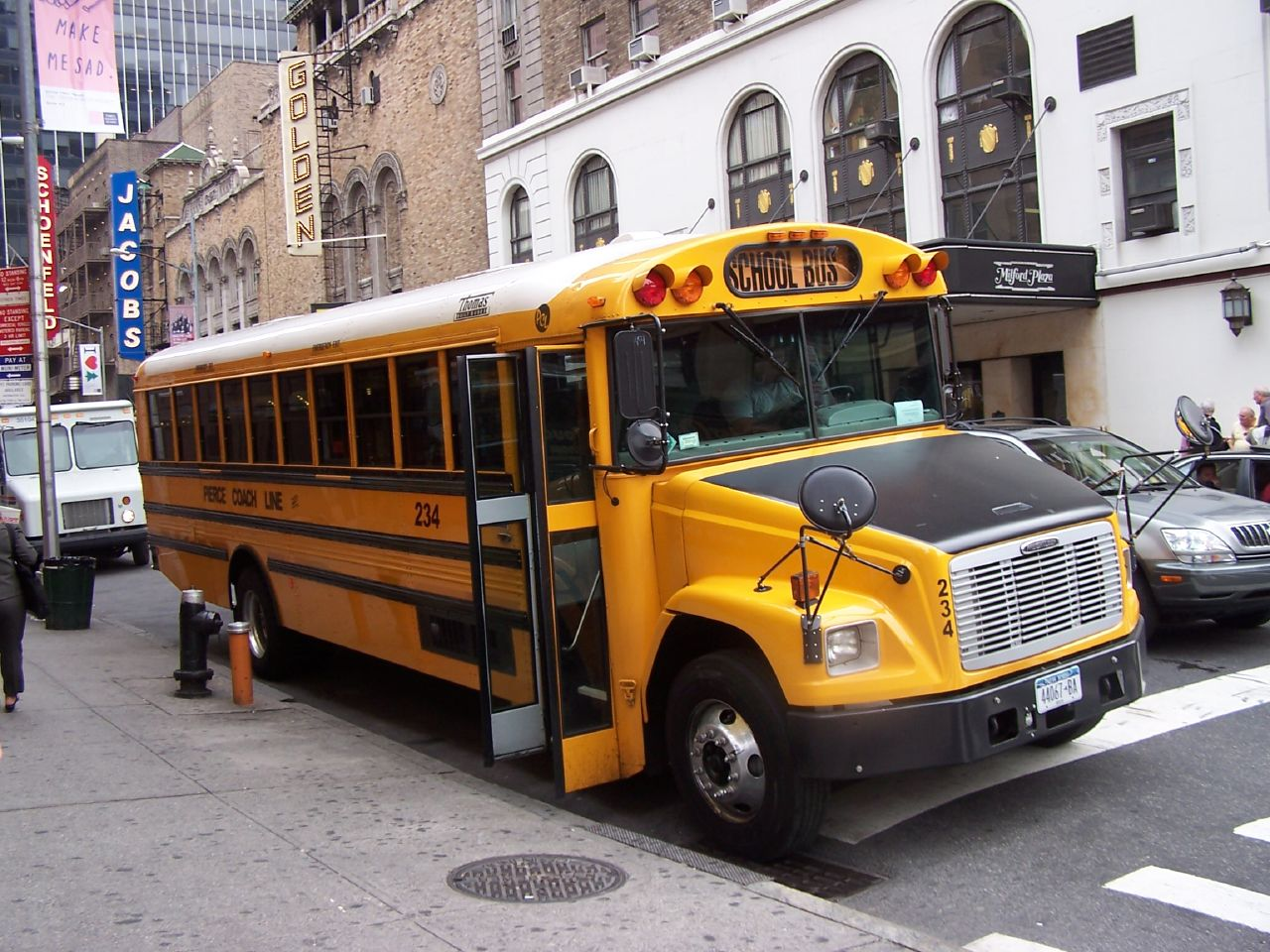

Overview
- Manufacturer: Thomas Built Buses (Freightliner)
- Production: 1997–2006
- Assembly: United States: Gaffney, South Carolina (chassis); High Point, North Carolina (Thomas High Point Plant; manufacturing)

Body and chassis
- Class: Type C (conventional)
- Body style: Cowled chassis: School bus; Commercial bus
- Chassis: Freightliner FS-65
- Related: Freightliner FL-Series

Powertrain
- Engine: Cummins 5.9ISB; Caterpillar 3116 Caterpillar 3126 Caterpillar C7; Mercedes-Benz MBE 900
- Capacity: 14–81
- Power output: 185-250 hp
- Transmission: Allison automatic or Fuller manual transmissions

Dimensions
- Width: 96 in (2,438 mm)
- Curb weight: 18,000–35,000 lb (8,165–15,876 kg) (GVWR)

Chronology
- Predecessor: Thomas Saf-T-Liner Conventional
- Successor: Thomas Saf-T-Liner C2

The Thomas Saf-T-Liner FS-65 (often shortened to Thomas FS-65) is a bus manufactured by Thomas Built Buses from 1997 to 2006. The first cowled-chassis bus designed by Freightliner for Thomas, the FS-65 served as an indirect successor of the long-running Ford B series chassis, which was discontiuned by Ford in 1998. Produced primarily as a yellow school bus, the model line is also produced for commercial use and other specialty configurations.

Thomas manufactures the FS-65 school bus in High Point, North Carolina, while the chassis is built in Gaffney, South Carolina, which was opened in 1995. After a total of 62,764 units of the FS-65 chassis were produced, with most bodies were built by Thomas, the final Thomas Saf-T-Liner FS-65 was delivered on December 13, 2006 to Maryland-based O'Brien Bus Service, Inc.

== Design history ==
Last FS-65 Produced
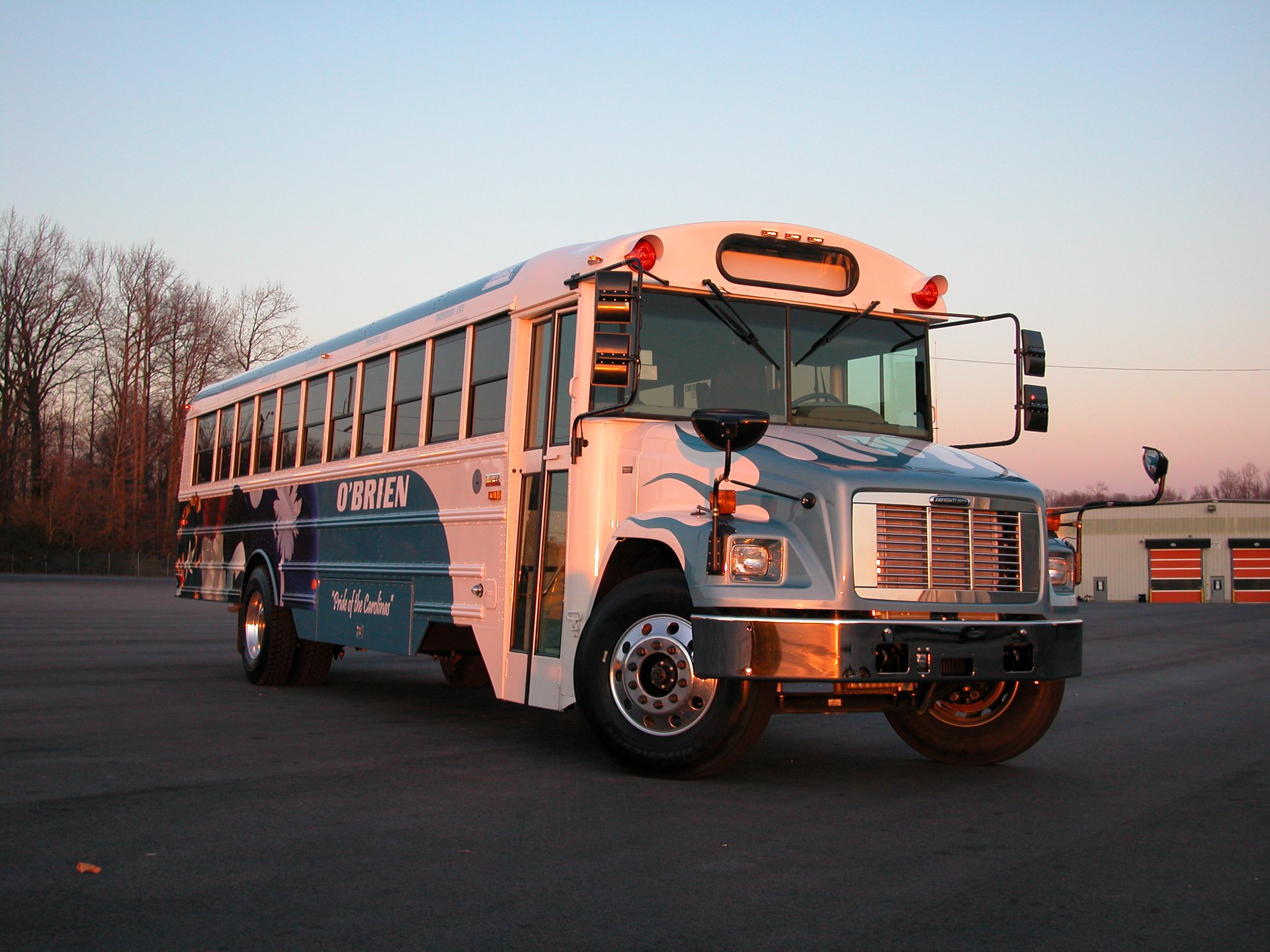

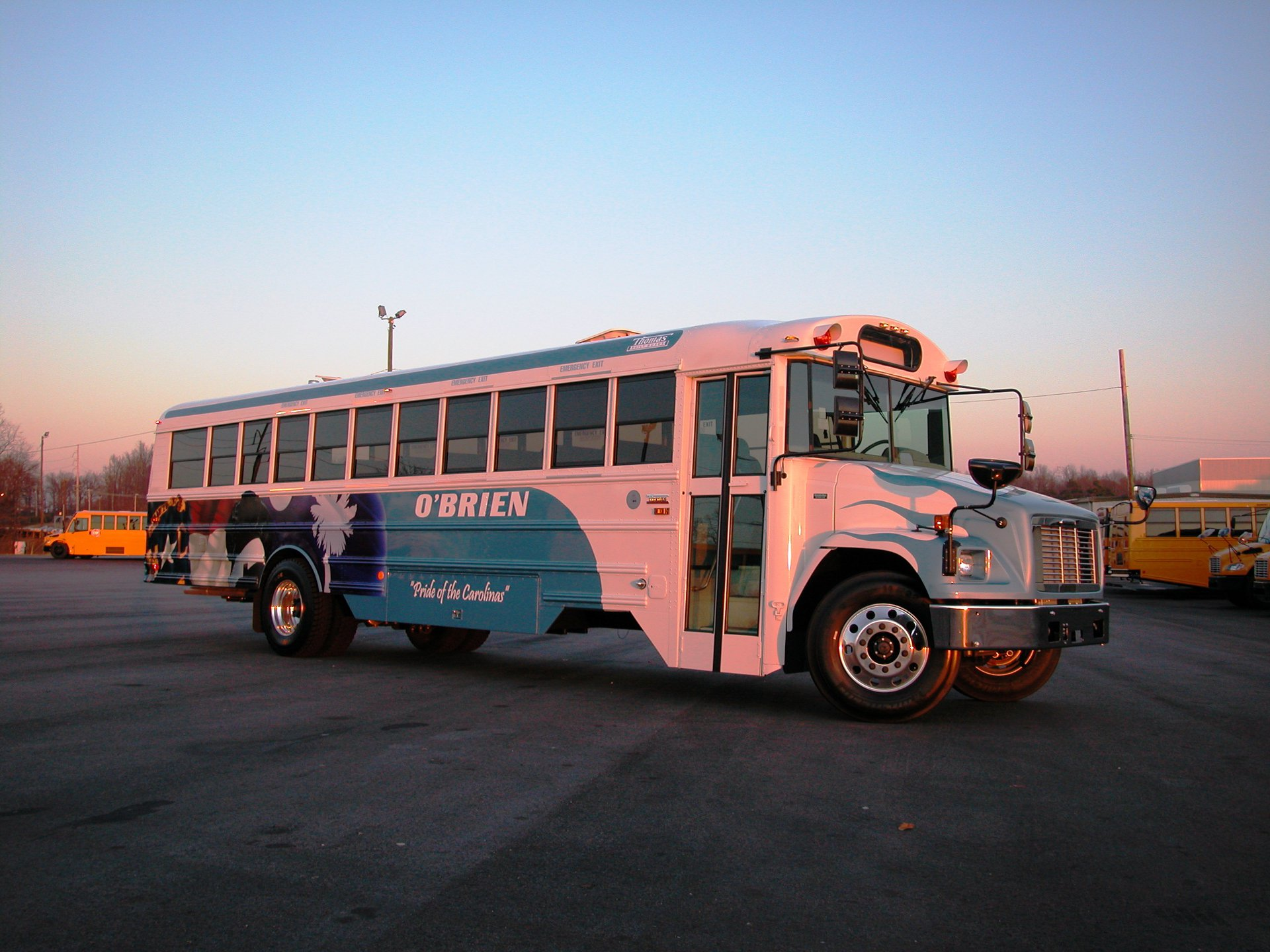
The last Saf-T-Liner FS-65 was produced in November 2006. Owned by O'Brien Bus Service, Inc. based out of Maryland.

Following the 1991 introduction of the Business Class medium-duty trucks, Freightliner Trucks began development of a school bus chassis based upon the vehicle; this bus chassis used for the Thomas FS-65 was designed in 1995. In May 1996, the first Thomas FS-65 prototype was unveiled. The first completely new school bus chassis introduced since the 1980 redesign of the Ford B-Series, the Freightliner Freightliner FS-65 was scheduled for mid-1996 production; the first FS-65 bus rolled off the assembly line in January 1997; this bus was a Thomas.

The FS-65 distinguished itself from other school bus chassis by the standardization of hydraulic anti-lock brakes at the time of its introduction (two years before their requirement in 1998). In tandem with the sloped hood, to aid driver visibility, the design of the chassis used a raised platform for the driver's seat. Although the FS-65 was designed alongside Thomas Built Buses (a company which Freightliner acquired in 1998), the Freightliner chassis was made available to other body manufacturers.

During its production run, the FS-65 chassis saw relatively few changes. After 2002, all Freightliner FS-65 chassis wore Thomas bodies. The FS-65 is easily distinguishable from a regular Saf-T-Liner by its 4-piece windshield; the standard Saf-T-Liner Conventional used a smaller, 2-piece windshield. For 2002, the Mercedes-Benz MBE900 diesel engines were added to the powertrain line as an option. For 2004, the Caterpillar 3126 became the Caterpillar C7 (as part of an emissions upgrade). A redesign of the instrument panel adopted a new instrument cluster, shared with the M2 and Sterling trucks.

In 2002, Freightliner introduced the second-generation Business Class, the M2. In 2004, the Thomas Saf-T-Liner C2 was introduced as the school bus variant of the M2. Sold alongside the C2, the FS-65 remained in production into the 2007 model year. In November 2004, Thomas delivered its first Saf-T-Liner C2, the successor of the FS-65, to Durham School Services.

On December 13, 2006, Thomas delivered its final FS-65 bus model to O'Brien Bus Service of College Park, Maryland, owned by Gary O'Brien. The 2006 discontinuation of the FS-65 marked the end of the FL-Series (alongside its severe-service variants), as medium-duty production ended after 2004.

== Powertrain ==
At its launch, the Caterpillar 3126 and Cummins ISB diesel engines were the standard engines. The FS-65 comes standard with an Allison 2500 automatic transmission with an Allison 3000 automatic transmission as an option. The Saf-T-Liner FS-65 is the only school bus in North America offered with a manual transmission; a rarely ordered option is a Fuller 5-speed transmission.

Engine	Production	Configuration	Transmission
Caterpillar 3126/C7	1997–2006	7.2 L (441 cu in) turbo I6	Allison 2500 automatic Allison AT-545; Allison MD3060; Fuller 5-speed manual
Cummins ISB	1997–2006	5.9 L (359 cu in) turbo I6	Allison 2500 automatic Allison AT-545; Allison MD3060; Fuller 5-speed manual
Mercedes-Benz MBE900 (OM904LA)	2002–2006	4.2 L (259 cu in) turbo I4 (MBE904)	Allison 2500 automatic Allison AT-545; Allison MD3060; Fuller 5-speed manual
Mercedes-Benz MBE900 (OM904LA)	2002–2006	6.4 L (388 cu in) turbo I6 (MBE906)	Allison 2500 automatic Allison AT-545; Allison MD3060; Fuller 5-speed manual

== Comparable products ==
- Blue Bird Conventional, CV200, and the Vision
- International IC/IC Corporation CE Series

== See also ==
- Freightliner FS-65—The bus chassis used for the Saf-T-Liner FS-65.
- Freightliner C2—The successor to the FS-65 chassis.
