= Ward Industries =

Ward Industries may refer to one of three companies:

- Ward Industries, a corporate parent of Ward Line
- Ward Industries, a corporate predecessor to the Dragor Shipping Corporation (1964), and later to American Export Industries (1967)
- Ward Industries, also known as Ward Body Works
