= Chevrolet/GMC B series =

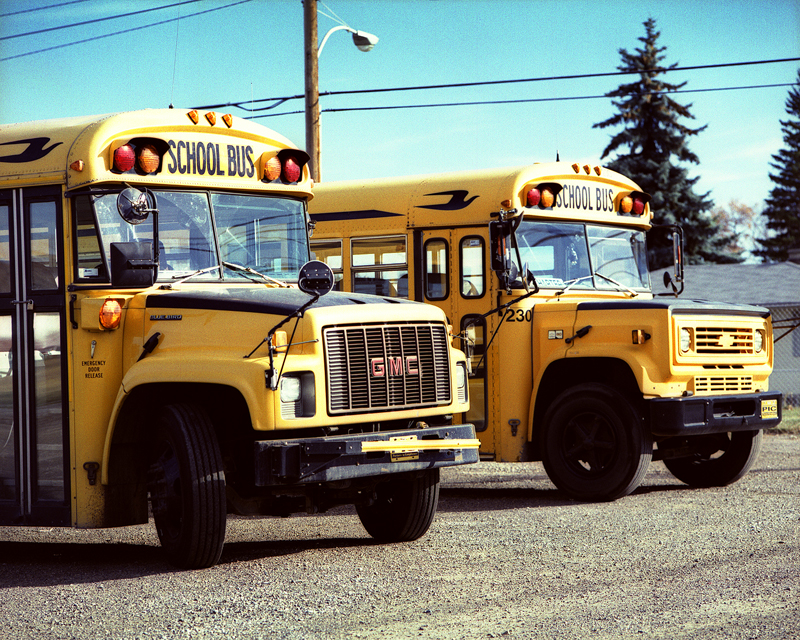
- 1993 GMC B series (left) and 1984 Chevrolet B series (right)

Overview
- Type: Bus
- Manufacturer: General Motors
- Also called: Chevrolet/GMC S-series
- Production: 1966-2002
- Model years: 1967-2003

Body and chassis
- Class: Class 6-7 (Medium/heavy-duty)
- Chassis: Full-length frame, body cowl

Chronology
- Predecessor: Chevrolet/GMC C/K (medium duty)
- Successor: GMT560 (2004-2009); Blue Bird Vision (indirect)

The Chevrolet/GMC B series (also known as the S-series) are a series of cowled chassis that were produced by General Motors from the 1967 to the 2003 model years. A variant of Chevrolet and GMC medium-duty trucks, the B-series was developed primarily for bus use. While primarily used for school bus applications, General Motors offered the chassis for multiple commercial and specialty uses.

Like the Chevrolet P-series chassis and the Cadillac Commercial Chassis, the B-series is assembled as an incomplete vehicle for second-stage manufacturers, who produced all bodywork aft of the firewall. Initially derived from the medium-duty C/K series, later examples used the GMT530 platform.

General Motors ended production of the B-series line after 2002, with the company concentrating bus production on cutaway-cab chassis. The medium-duty GMT560 chassis was also used for bus applications, but was only produced with a cutaway cab. As of current production, General Motors still provides a platform for both school bus and commercial bus applications, derived exclusively from the GMT610 cutaway van (Chevrolet Express/GMC Savana).

== Background ==
Prior to 1966, all medium- and heavy-duty trucks of General Motors were derived heavily from the C/K series trucks (and the Task Force trucks before them). Though sharing the same cab along with other body components, 2-ton trucks and above were fitted with a stronger frame and higher-capacity suspension. With the exception of divisionally-produced engines, Chevrolet and GMC medium-duty trucks were largely identical to one another. Consequently, the conventional-type school bus chassis used for both divisions were largely the same.

As an incomplete vehicle, the B-series chassis shared only its front cowl, hood, and fenders (from 1984 onward, the latter two were integrated together) with production C/K trucks. Along with no bodywork aft of the firewall, the chassis was fitted with its own dashboard (holding only the instrument cluster).

The B-series followed the development of the C/K medium-duty truck lines, though the "Action Line" generation outlived its C-series counterpart by a decade, remaining in production through 1983.

== First generation (1967–1983) ==
First generation (1967–1983)
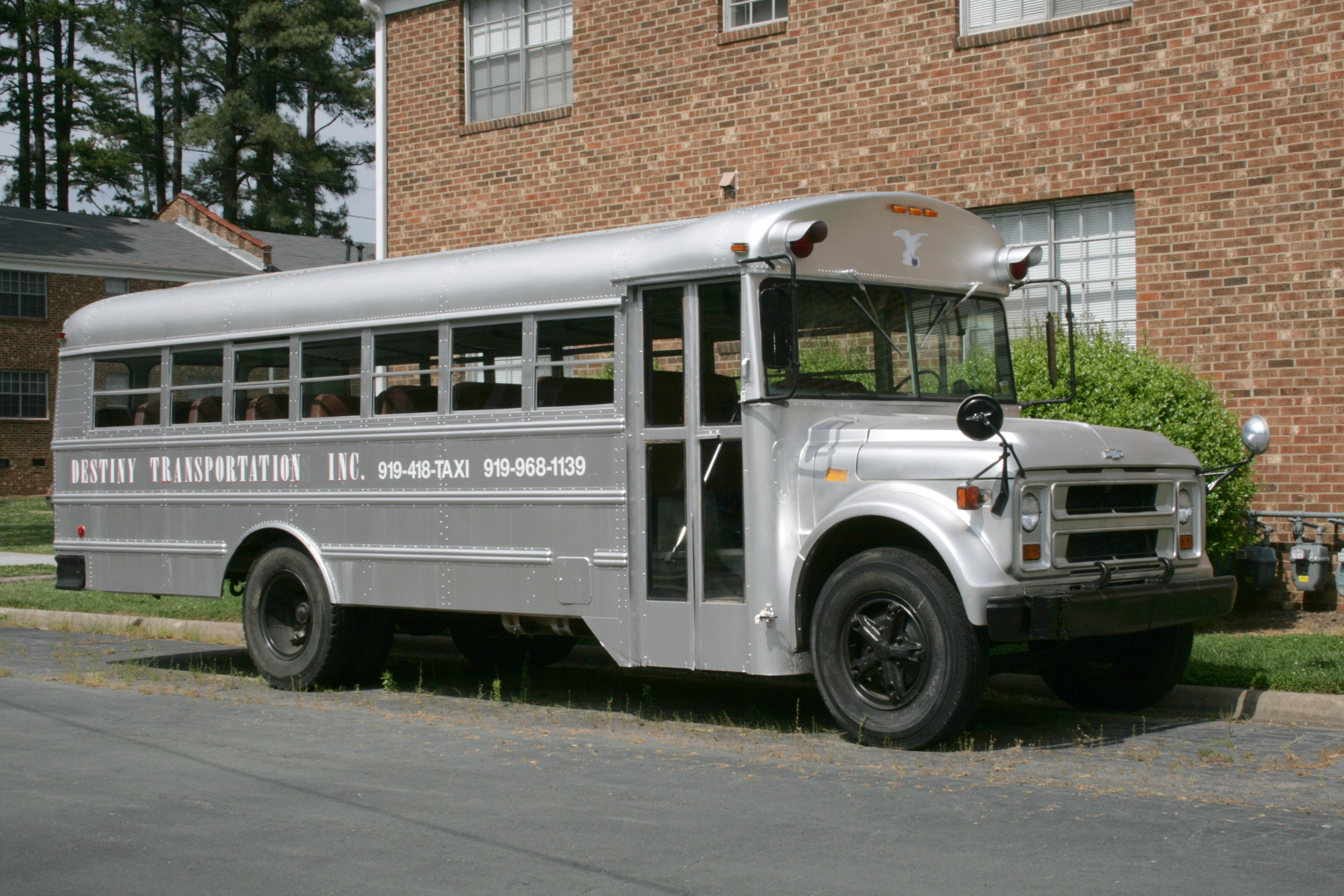
- Retired 1977–1983 Chevrolet school bus (Body: Thomas Built Buses) in use as a shuttle bus in North Carolina

Overview
- Manufacturer: Chevrolet/GMC; GMC Truck & Coach (1967-1970 GMC)
- Also called: Chevrolet\GMC S-series (1967-1979)
- Production: Chevrolet: 1967-1983 (Action Line); GMC: 1966-1970 (GMC E); 1970-1983 (Action Line)

Body and chassis
- Platform: Action-Line C/K
- Related: Chevrolet/GMC C/K medium duty GMC E5500/6500 (GMC 1967-1970)

Dimensions
- Wheelbase: 149–274 in (3,800–7,000 mm)

Following the introduction of the Action Line C/K generation for 1967, GM introduced two different versions of its bus chassis, with Chevrolet and GMC debuting their own designs. Chevrolet continued with an S-series derived from the medium-duty C-series (C50-C-70), with GMC introducing an S-series derived from its E-series medium-duty truck (a lighter-duty version of the H/J heavy truck). For 1970, GMC phased out the E-series, deriving its S-series from its version of the medium-duty Action Line trucks.

In 1980, GM dropped the S-series chassis designation, renaming it as the B-series. Chevrolet adopted the B60 designation, with GMC using B6000 (internally, B6).

The S-series/B-series is the longest-lived version of the Action Line C/K model family, remaining in production through 1983.

=== Chevrolet ===
In 1967, Chevrolet introduced the Action Line C/K, introducing an all-new S-series bus chassis. Derived primarily from the "2-ton" 50/60 series, the design continued with a rear-hinged "alligator"-design hood. The chassis used Chevrolet-produced inline-6 and V8 engines, including the 250 inline-6 (alongside the 292 inline-6), and 327 and 366 V8s. The 4 engines were offered with either 4 or 5-speed manuals (with optional 2-speed rear axle) and a 6-speed Allison automatic.

Through its production, the model line saw few changes, primarily related to the powertrain. For 1970, the 327 V8 was phased out in favor of a 350 V8. In 1971, the Allison AT475 3-speed automatic transmission became an option with single or two-speed rear axles. The 250 inline-6 was dropped for 1972, with the 292 remaining the standard engine; the same year, a GMC 478 "Toroflow" V6 became the first diesel-powered S-series. An Allison CH465 4-speed automatic became the standard transmission, with the 3-speed becoming an option (alongside the 4 and 5-speed manuals). In 1974, the 292 I6 and the V6 478 diesel were both dropped (the latter, as GMC ended its divisional engine production), with the 350 V8 becoming the standard engine. In another change, the 3-speed AT475 transmission was replaced by the 4-speed AT540.

For 1980, the engine lineup expanded by two, introducing the option of a 427 V8; a 8.2L Detroit Diesel V8 (marketed as the "Fuel Pincher") reintroduced a diesel-fuel engine as an option in both turbocharged and naturally-aspirated form.

=== GMC ===
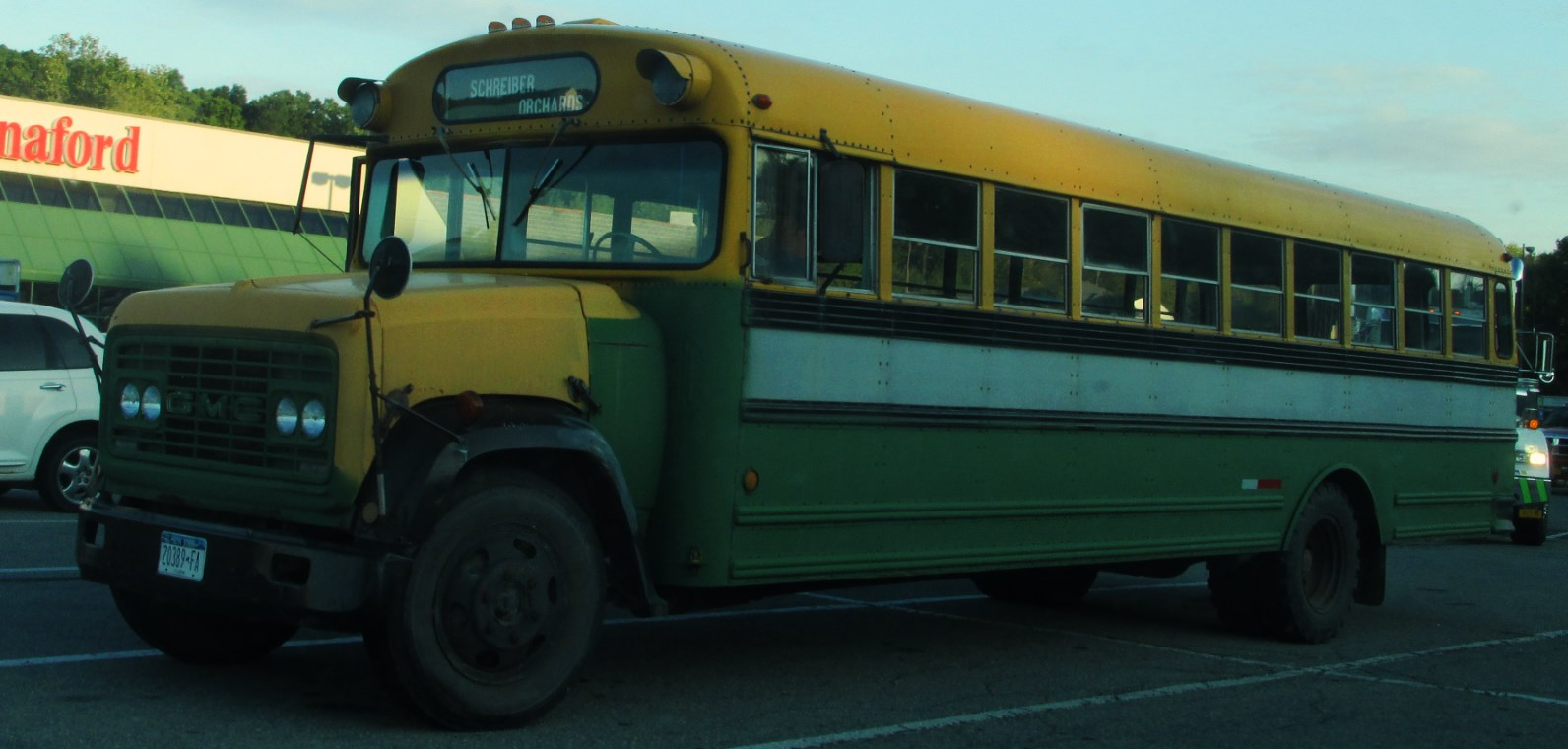
1967-1970 GMC S6500 school bus (retired)

For 1967, the GMC division moved its school bus chassis from the medium-duty C/K to its E-series short-hood medium-duty truck (a medium-duty version of the H/J heavy truck, a forerunner of the GMC Brigadier). The hood was offered in a center-hinged "butterfly" configuration. The line was powered by GMC-sourced V6 gasoline engines.

During 1969, GMC dropped the shorter-hood E-series, adopting the C-series as its standard medium-duty line. For 1970, the GMC S-series became an Action Line C-series truck. In addition to a division-specific grille, GMC offered additional engine options over Chevrolet, including its 305, 351, 401 V6 engines; the 478 V6 was offered in both gasoline and diesel versions.

Following the discontinuation of GMC-produced engines in 1974, the GMC Action Line S-series became essentially identical to its Chevrolet counterpart.

== Second generation (1984–1991) ==
Second generation (1984–1991)
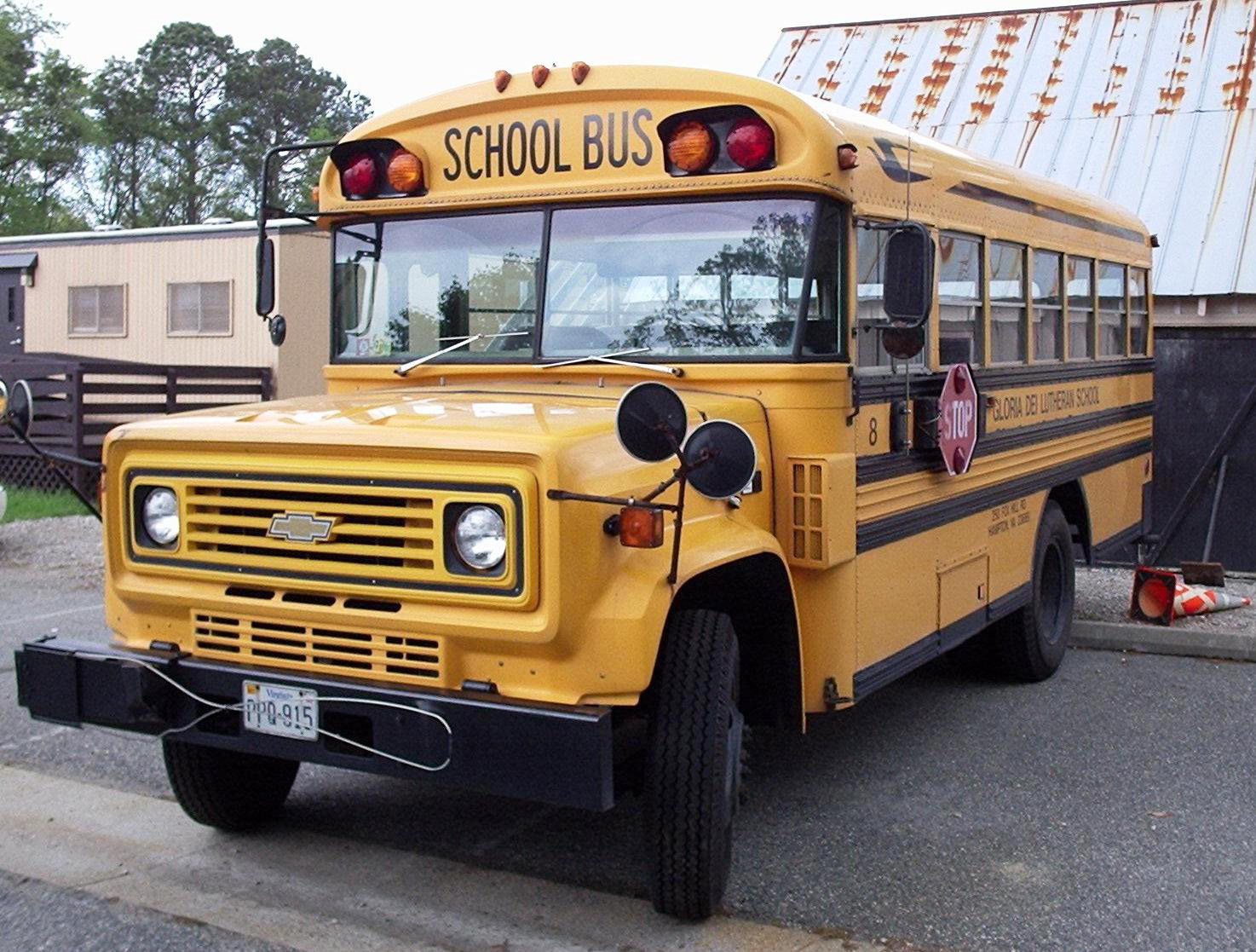
- Retired late 1980s Chevrolet school bus (Body: Blue Bird Corporation) in use as a church bus in Virginia

Overview
- Manufacturer: Chevrolet/GMC
- Production: 1984-1991

Body and chassis
- Platform: Rounded-Line C/K
- Related: Chevrolet P60; Chevrolet/GMC S7

Redesignated the B-series for 1980, the model line entered its second generation for 1984 (11 years after the Rounded Line generation debuted). Internally codenamed B6, the same design was used by both Chevrolet and GMC, with the two differing only by the design of their grilles. The drivers' compartment saw little change, as the second generation shared its steering column with its predecessor (with a nearly unchanged instrument panel). In a major functional change, a front-hinged tilting hood became standard, allowing improved engine access.

The second generation largely carried over the powertrain line introduced in 1980. The Chevrolet 350 remained standard, with optional 366 and 427 V8s; the "Fuel Pincher" V8 remained an option (both with or without a turbocharger). Along with 5-speed manuals, the Allison AT545 4-speed automatic (introduced at the beginning of the 1980s) became the available automatic transmission.

The second generation S-series spawned two variants during its production. The stripped-chassis P60/P70 is a forward-control stripped chassis. A medium-duty version of the P-series, the P60/P70 was adopted for bus use, combining a full-length body with a shorter hood (to improve forward visibility); bodybuilders Ward Body Works and Thomas Built Buses debuted designs in the 1980s (the Ward Patriot and the Thomas Vista). The S7 (introduced in 1983) is a front-engine forward control bus; serving as the successor of the rear-engine "pusher" R-series, the S7 adopted many components from the B6, along with its 427 V8 and 8.2L diesel V8.

The Rounded Line B-series was produced through 1991, outliving the rest of its platform by two years.

Powertrain details
Engine	Configuration	Fuel	Production
Chevrolet Mark IV	366 cu in (6.0 L) OHV 90° 16V V8	Gasoline	1984-1991
Chevrolet Mark IV	427 cu in (7.0 L) OHV 90° 16V V8	Gasoline	1984-1991
Detroit Diesel "Fuel Pincher"	500 cu in (8.2 L) OHV 90° 16V V8 (naturally aspirated, turbocharged)	Diesel	1984-1991

== Third generation (1993–2003) ==
Third generation (1993–2003)
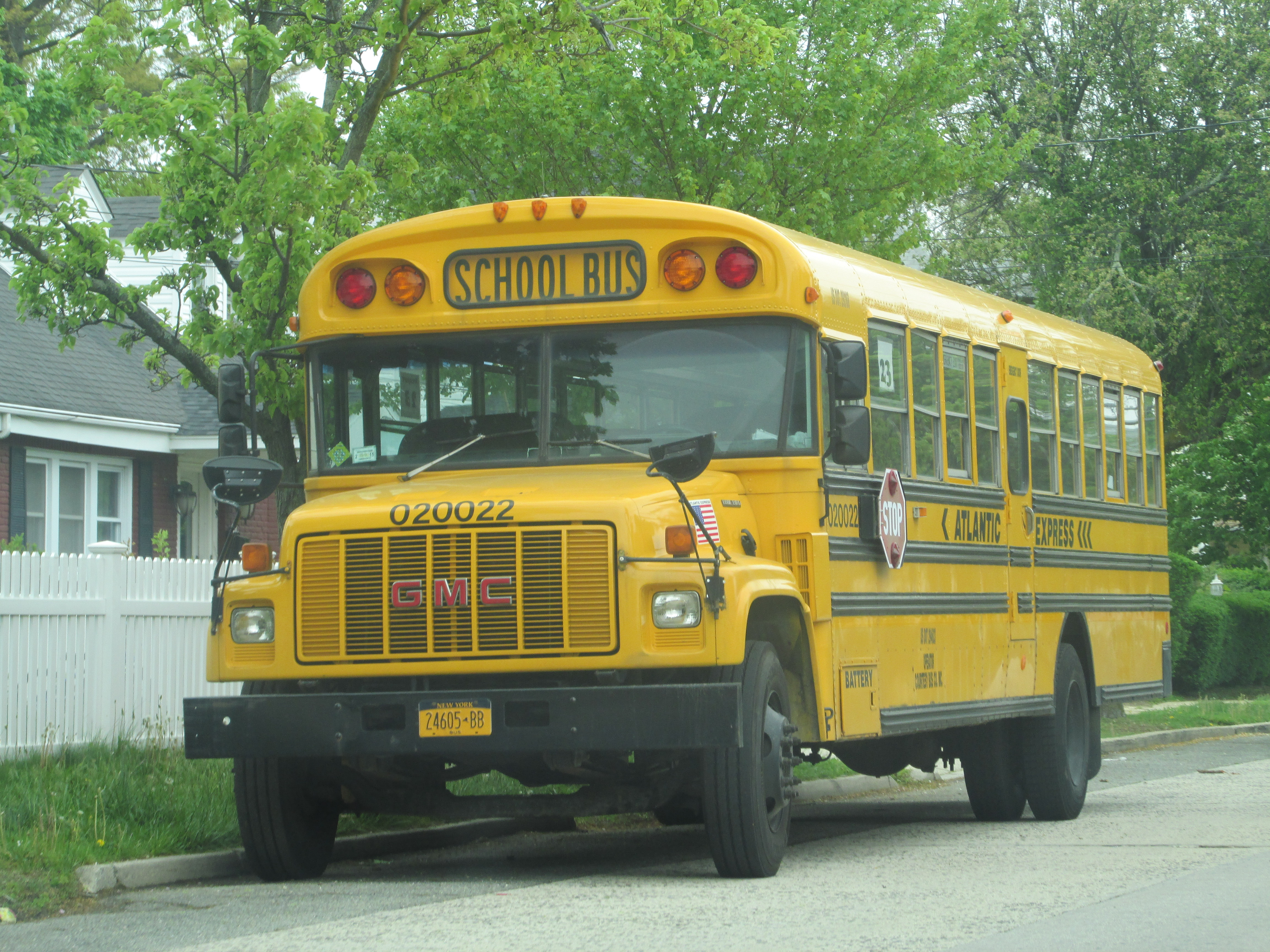
- Late 1990s GMC school bus in use in New York.

Overview
- Manufacturer: Chevrolet; GMC
- Also called: Blue Bird CV200 (with body)
- Production: 1992-2002
- Model years: 1993-2003

Body and chassis
- Platform: GM GMT 530 platform
- Related: Chevrolet Kodiak/GMC TopKick

After skipping 1992 production entirely, General Motors released the B7 generation, adopting the GMT530 medium-duty truck platform. Dropping the Chevrolet Kodiak/GMC TopKick branding, the B7 was developed to become the standard chassis for Blue Bird conventional-style buses. While fitted with a lower hoodline than its predecessor, the chassis was fitted with a much larger grille; only divisional badging differentiated Chevrolet and GMC versions from each other.

For 1993 production, the B7 model line saw a number of powertrain changes from its B6 predecessor. Dropping the 350 V8, large-block V8s became standard with the 366 V8 becoming standard (becoming the only gasoline engine). Coinciding with the discontinuation of the 8.2L V8, GM replaced it with the Caterpillar 3116 6.6L inline-6 as an option. The P60/P70 were discontinued, leaving the B7 produced only as a cowl-hood chassis (the S7 was discontinued before 1990).

For 1998, the powertrain underwent several revisions, with a 7.4L V8 replacing the long-running 6.0L engine. As an option, the B7 added the Caterpillar 3126 7.2L inline-6 turbodiesel as a second diesel option. The model line retained the previous higher-profile hood instead of the lower-profile sloping hood added to GMT530 trucks. For 2001, the gasoline engine was enlarged to 8.1L displacement.

Following 2003 production, the B7 was retired, as GM medium-duty trucks moved from the GMT530 to the redesigned GMT560 architecture. The new platform was not developed as a cowled chassis, with bus applications using a cutaway-cab design exclusively; while most examples were assembled for commercial-use applications, a smaller portion were bodied as school buses.

=== Powertrain details ===
In line with its predecessor, the third-generation B-series was offered with a range of gasoline and diesel engines. The 7.0L V8 was discontinued, leaving the 6.0L V8 as the sole gasoline engine. As part of the 1997 GMT530 revision, the 6.0L V8 was replaced by the Vortec 7.4L V8; in 2001, an all-new 8.1L V8 (one of the largest gasoline engines ever used in a school bus) became the gasoline engine. As gasoline engines fell out of favor in large school buses during the 1990s, GM would become the final manufacturer to offer a full-size bus chassis with a gasoline-fuel engine, with the 8.1L V8 serving as the final example from 2003 to 2016.

Alongside the standard gasoline V8, the GMT530 was offered with multiple diesel engine offerings as an option. Initially offered with the Caterpillar 3116 inline-6, the Caterpillar 3126 inline-6 became an option in 1997.

The GMT530 chassis was offered with 5 or 6-speed manual transmissions, along with multiple Allison automatic transmissions. The model line was also offered with multiple options for alternative-fuel configurations. Alongside conversions of gasoline engines to use LPG (propane), the GMT530 was also offered with options to use CNG (compressed natural gas).

Powertrain details
Engine	Configuration	Fuel	Production
Chevrolet Mark IV	366 cu in (6.0 L) OHV V8	Gasoline	1993-1998
Chevrolet L21 (Vortec 7400)	454 cu in (7.4 L) OHV V8	Gasoline	1998-2001
Chevrolet L18 (Vortec 8100)	496 cu in (8.1 L) OHV V8	Gasoline	2001-2003
Caterpillar 3116	402 cu in (6.6 L) OHV turbocharged inline-6	Diesel	1993-2003
Caterpillar 3126	442 cu in (7.2 L) OHV turbocharged inline-6	Diesel	1997-2003

=== Blue Bird CV200 ===
Prior to 1992, the General Motors cowled bus chassis was available for use to any bus body manufacturer. That year, GM entered a supply and marketing agreement with body manufacturer Blue Bird; for the next 10 years, Blue Bird became the exclusive manufacturer to body the then-new GMT530 cowled chassis, naming the result the Blue Bird CV200. Under the agreement, the GM B-7 (external code name for the GMT530-based bus chassis) became standard equipment for all Blue Bird Conventionals, although International and Ford (later, Freightliner) chassis were allowed as options.

The 1992 supply agreement was among a series of 1990s mergers and acquisitions between body manufacturers and chassis suppliers of school buses. Coinciding with its declining share of medium-duty truck production, the agreement would cripple the market share of GM as a supplier of full-size cowled bus chassis. After failing to renew its supply agreement with Blue Bird in 2002, General Motors was effectively shut out of full-size chassis production, as both body manufacturers competing with Blue Bird were wholly owned by the largest competitors of GM in the medium-duty segment.

In 2003, Blue Bird introduced the Blue Bird Vision for 2004 production, marking the first cowled-chassis school bus to use a proprietary chassis (not shared with a medium-duty truck).

== Usage by body manufacturers ==
While used nearly exclusively for school bus use, the B-series chassis was adapted for a wide variety of uses by body manufacturers, ranging from bookmobiles to police buses. In the school bus industry, the General Motors chassis was popular for its wide range of engines. During the 1980s and 1990s, its continued use of gasoline engines remained popular, as the powerplants were sometimes used as the basis for conversion to alternative fuels, including LPG (propane) and CNG (compressed natural gas).

Following the chassis and supply agreement between General Motors and Blue Bird in 1992, the B series was bodied exclusively by that company, nearly exclusively as a school bus.

- Blue Bird (1966-2002)
- Carpenter Industries, Inc. (1966-1991)
- Gillig Bros. (1966-c.1980)
- New Bus Company (1987-1988)
- Northern Coach (1977-1978)
- Perley A. Thomas Car Works (1966-1972)
- Superior Coach Company (1966-1980, 1982–1985)
- Thomas Built Buses, Inc. (1972-1991)
- Ward Body Works (1966-1991)
- Wayne Corporation (1966-1991)

== See also ==
- Chevrolet Kodiak/GMC TopKick – B-series donor platform (1993–2003)
- Ford B series, International Harvester S-series "Schoolmaster", and International 3800 – competing school bus chassis
- List of buses
