= Thomas Vista =

Bus by Thomas Built Buses, 1989–1998

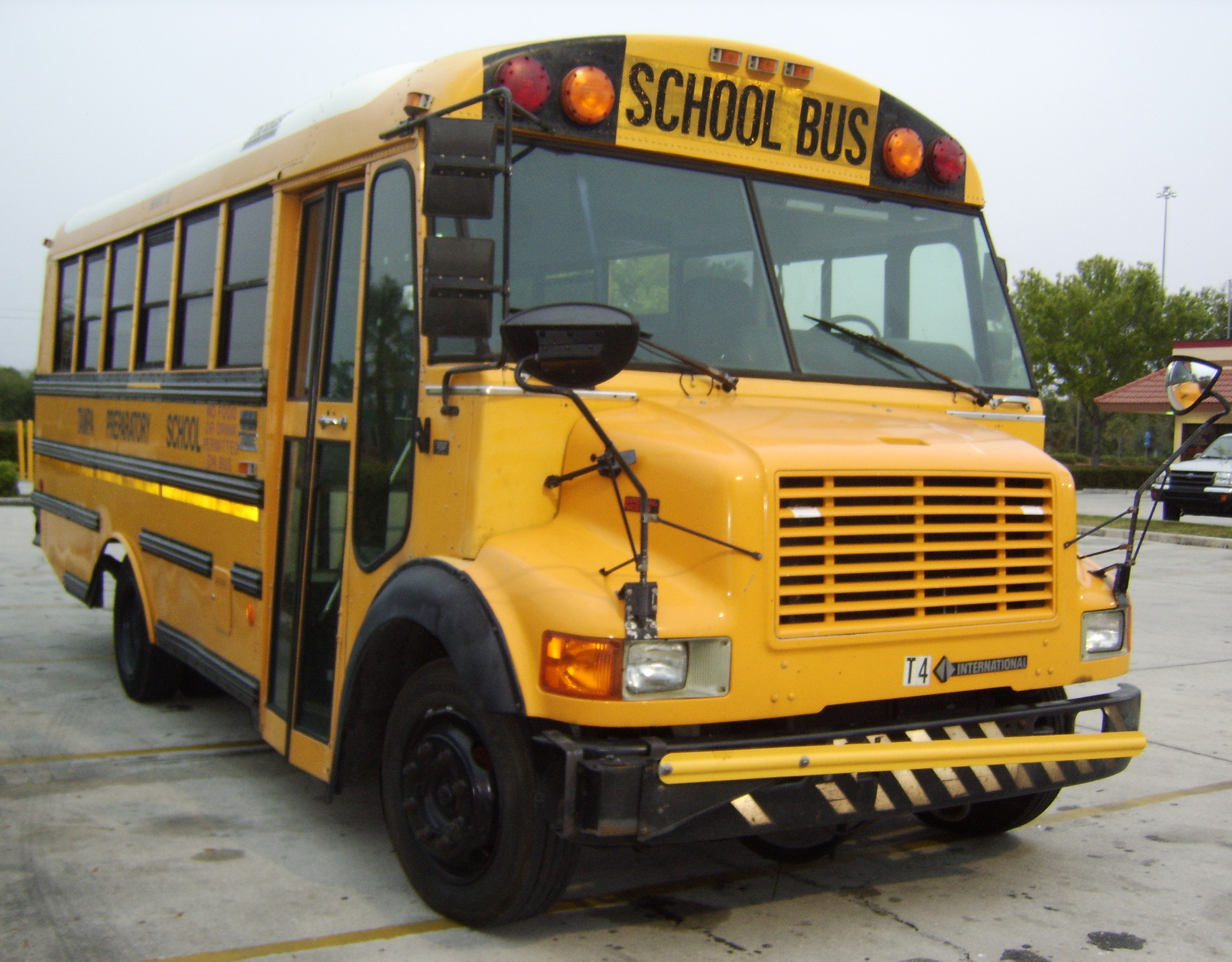
- 1995-1998 Thomas Vista

Overview
- Manufacturer: Thomas Built Buses, Inc.
- Production: 1989–1998
- Model years: 1989-1998
- Assembly: United States: High Point, North Carolina (Thomas High Point Plant)

Body and chassis
- Class: Type C (semiforward-control conventional)
- Body style: School bus
- Layout: Semiforward-control 4x2
- Platform: Chevrolet/GMC B-Series; International 3600
- Chassis: Cowled chassis
- Related: Thomas Saf-T-Liner Conventional

Powertrain
- Engine: Chevrolet 350 5.7L V8; Chevrolet 366 6.0L V8; Chevrolet 427 7.0L V8; Detroit Diesel 8.2 L V8; International DT360 I6; International DT408 I6; International 7.3 L IDI V8; International DT466 I6; International DT466E I6; International T444E V8
- Transmission: Allison AT545 four-speed automatic Allison MT643 four-speed automatic

Dimensions
- Width: 96 in (2,400 mm)

Chronology
- Predecessor: Thomas Mighty Mite
- Successor: Thomas Saf-T-Liner Conventional; Thomas Saf-T-Liner FS-65; Thomas Saf-T-Liner C2

The Thomas Vista is a model line of buses that was manufactured by Thomas Built Buses from 1989 to 1998. Produced nearly exclusively as a school bus, the model line was also sold in commercial-use configurations. To improve forward sightlines for drivers, the chassis design of the Vista combines elements of conventional buses and transit-style school buses (as well as those from smaller buses).

Following the 1998 acquisition of Thomas Built Buses by Freightliner, Thomas ended the production of the Vista in favor of the standard Saf-T-Liner Conventional. While the 2004 Thomas Saf-T-Liner C2 was not intended as a direct replacement, elements of its body design incorporated features previously used in the Thomas Vista.

== Background ==
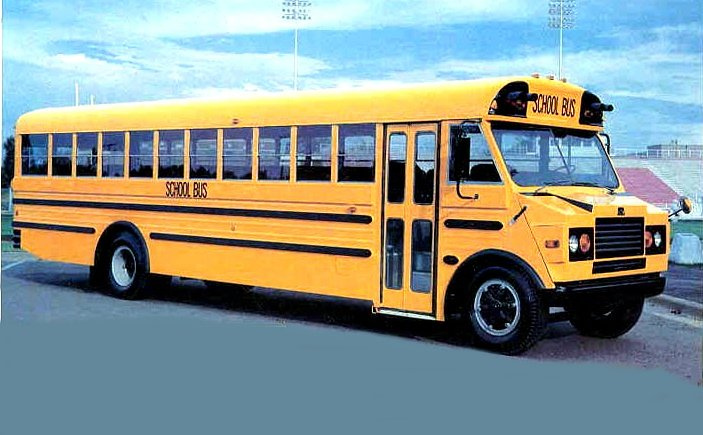
Ward/AmTran Patriot, first semi-forward control school bus

During the early 1980s, school bus manufacturing in the United States underwent a period of relative turmoil, as the exit of the baby boom generation from the public education system created a sharp decline in student populations. In the late 1970s, the US federal government had significantly upgraded crash protection standards for school buses.

While safety had long played a key role in the marketing and development of school buses, designers were forced to take a proactive stance to increase innovation to production. By improving the sightlines of the driver, the chances of preventing accidents improved, as well.

In 1985, AmTran/Ward introduced the Ward Patriot, a semi-forward control body configuration. By reconfiguring the Chevrolet/GMC B-Series chassis so that the engine was positioned next to the drivers' seat, the front body was modified significantly, with a sloped windshield, with the sloped hood nearly out of view. While similar in layout to a small Type B bus, the design of the Patriot adopted the heavier-duty components of a full-sized Type C bus body design.

== Model history ==
Through its production, Thomas Built Buses produced two different versions of the Thomas Vista. From 1989 to 1991, the Vista was built using a General Motors chassis and model-specific bodywork. From 1992 to 1998, the Vista was built on Navistar International chassis, using modified International bodywork.

=== 1989–1991 ===
For 1989, Thomas Built Buses introduced the Thomas Vista as its own semi-forward control bus. Adopting the same reconfigured Chevrolet/GMC chassis as the Ward Patriot, Thomas introduced several new design elements for the Vista. To improve engine access, Thomas designed the bodywork to allow for a larger hood opening than the Ward Patriot. To minimize the blind spots in loading and unloading passengers, the bodywork ahead of the door was given a "loading-zone" window, as on the Thomas Minotour.

Sharing the General Motors chassis of the Ward Patriot, the first-generation Thomas Vista adopted much of its bodywork from the standard Thomas Saf-T-Liner Conventional. As with both the Conventional and Saf-T-Liner EF/ER, Thomas built the Vista its own dashboard and control panel, with the Vista receiving a GM-sourced steering column and instruments. The engine of the Vista sat next to the driver (a Detroit Diesel 8.2 L V8), similar to the Saf-T-Liner EF.

After 1991, General Motors entered into a supply agreement to supply the B-Series to body manufacturer Blue Bird Corporation, effectively ending the production of the GM-chassis Thomas Vista.

| Engine | Years produced | Notes |
|---|---|---|
| Detroit Diesel 8.2 L V8 | 1989–1991 | Available in turbocharged or nonturbo ("Fuel Pincher") configuration |

=== 1992–1998 ===
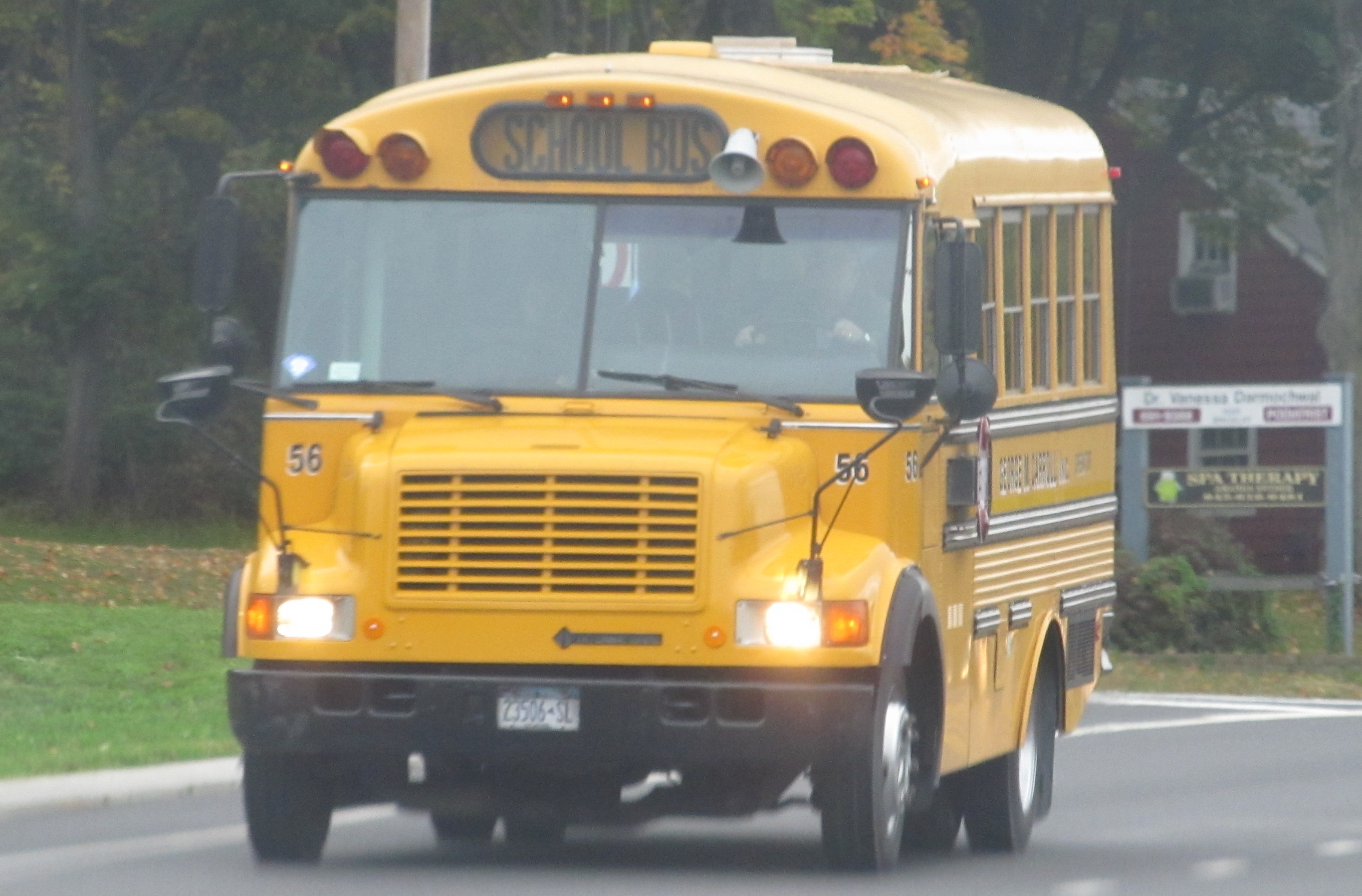
1994 Thomas Vista

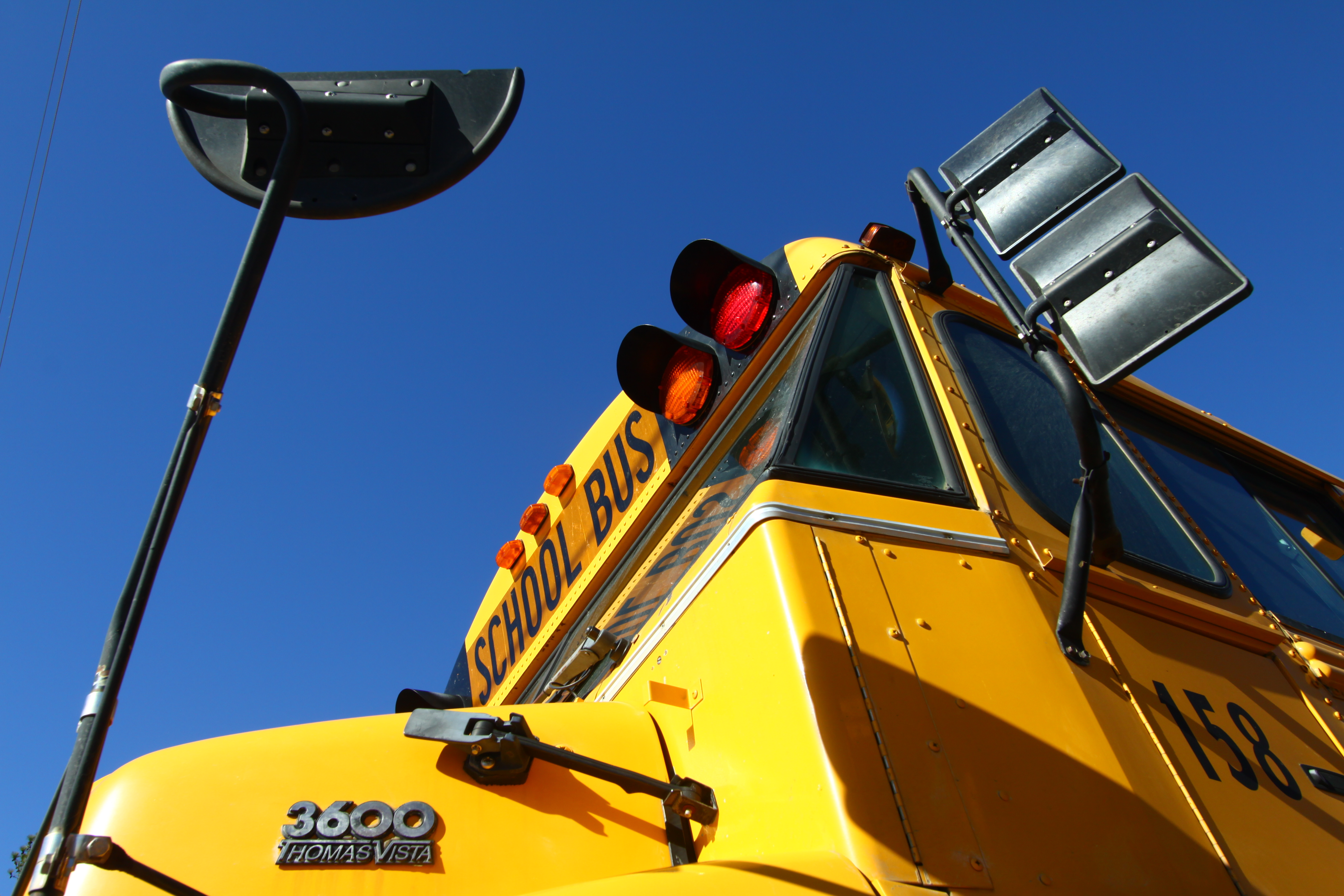
Closeup of sideview of Thomas Vista hood and windshield

For 1992, Thomas was able to continue production of the Vista, as it replaced the General Motors chassis with a design from Navistar International. While heavily derived from the International 3800, Navistar developed the purpose-built 3600 semi-forward control chassis specifically for the Vista.

To showcase the model change, Thomas fitted the Vista with a Navistar-supplied hood (cut nearly in half to fit the shortened chassis). For the first time, the Vista was available with multiple engines, as Navistar offered both the DT inline-six and IDI V8 diesels. As before, the driver of the Navistar-chassis Vista was positioned next to the engine, similar to a Thomas EF bus.

In 1994, the Vista underwent a redesign of its forward body; to eliminate several blind spots, the side window was enlarged (adopting a single piece of glass) and the windshield was changed to a wraparound, four-piece configuration. During the mid-1990s, Thomas introduced smaller-capacity versions of the Vista, serving as the functional successor of the Type B Mighty Mite.

Following the acquisition of Thomas by Freightliner in 1998, the Thomas Vista was withdrawn in favor of the Thomas Saf-T-Liner Conventional and Thomas-Saf-T-Liner FS-65. As the Navistar 3600 chassis was designed specifically for the Thomas Vista body, its production ended as well.

| Engine | Years produced | Notes |
|---|---|---|
| DTA360 | 1992–1994 | |
| 7.3L IDI (indirect injection) V8 | 1992–1994 | |
| DT466E | 1995–1998 | |
| T444E V8 | 1995–1998 | |
