= Thomas High Point Plant =

School bus factory in High Point, North Carolina

- Operated: 1916–present
- Location: 1408 Courtesy Road; High Point, North Carolina, United States
- Coordinates: 35.9419°N 80.0220°W
- Industry: Automotive
- Products: school buses
- Employees: 1,385 (2002)
- Area: High Point plant: 184 acres (74 ha); Archdale plant: 80 acres (32 ha)
- Volume: High Point plant: 686,000 square feet (63,700 m^{2}); Archdale plant: 275,000 square feet (25,500 m^{2})
- Owner: Thomas Built Buses (Daimler Trucks North America)

Thomas High Point Plant is a Thomas school bus manufacturing plant in High Point, North Carolina, owned by Daimler Trucks North America.

== History ==
The plant was opened in 1916 when the company was founded as Perley A. Thomas Car Works.

On March 5, 2001, Thomas announced it will lay off 125 employees at the High Point plant by 2002, however the company's president says that most of those employees have a good chance of being rehired.

In June 2002, Thomas announced it will build a $39 million, 275,000-square-foot school bus manufacturing plant in High Point, North Carolina for production of the new Saf-T-Liner C2. The facility broke ground on October 2, 2002, and was opened in 2004.

In June 2008, Thomas Built Buses laid off roughly 190 employees at its High Point, North Carolina, manufacturing plant. Four months later in October of the year, Thomas Built Buses laid off another 205 employees at its plants due to declining school bus demand.

In August 2010, Thomas Built Buses laid off approximately 220 workers at its High Point school bus manufacturing plant due to a continued dropping in demand for new school buses. In January 2012, 112 laid-off workers belonged to United Auto Workers (UAW) Local 5287 returned to the factory lines at the plant.

On September 11, 2018, Thomas announced it will lay off 115 employees at the plant by September 28th of the year.

== Products made ==
=== Current ===
- Thomas Saf-T-Liner C2 (2004–present)
- Thomas Saf-T-Liner (1977–present)
- Thomas Minotour (1980–present)

=== Former ===
- Thomas Saf-T-Liner Conventional (1972–2002)
- Thomas Saf-T-Liner FS-65 (1997–2006)
- Thomas Vista (1989–1998)
