= Caterpillar 3116 =

1988 diesel engine

The Caterpillar 3116 is a turbocharged 6.6L inline-6 cylinder diesel engine manufactured by Caterpillar and first introduced in 1988. It was the predecessor to the Caterpillar 3126, released in 1998. The Caterpillar 3116 was also used as a marine engine. The 3116 ran up to 330 HP.

== Applications ==
- Medium Duty Trucks including the Ford F600-F750, Chevrolet Kodiak/GMC TopKick, Peterbilt and Kenworth medium duty, and Freightliner Business Class.
- Buses, especially school buses, including those manufactured by Thomas and Blue Bird or the Ford B-Series and Thomas FS-65.
