= Freightliner FS-65 =

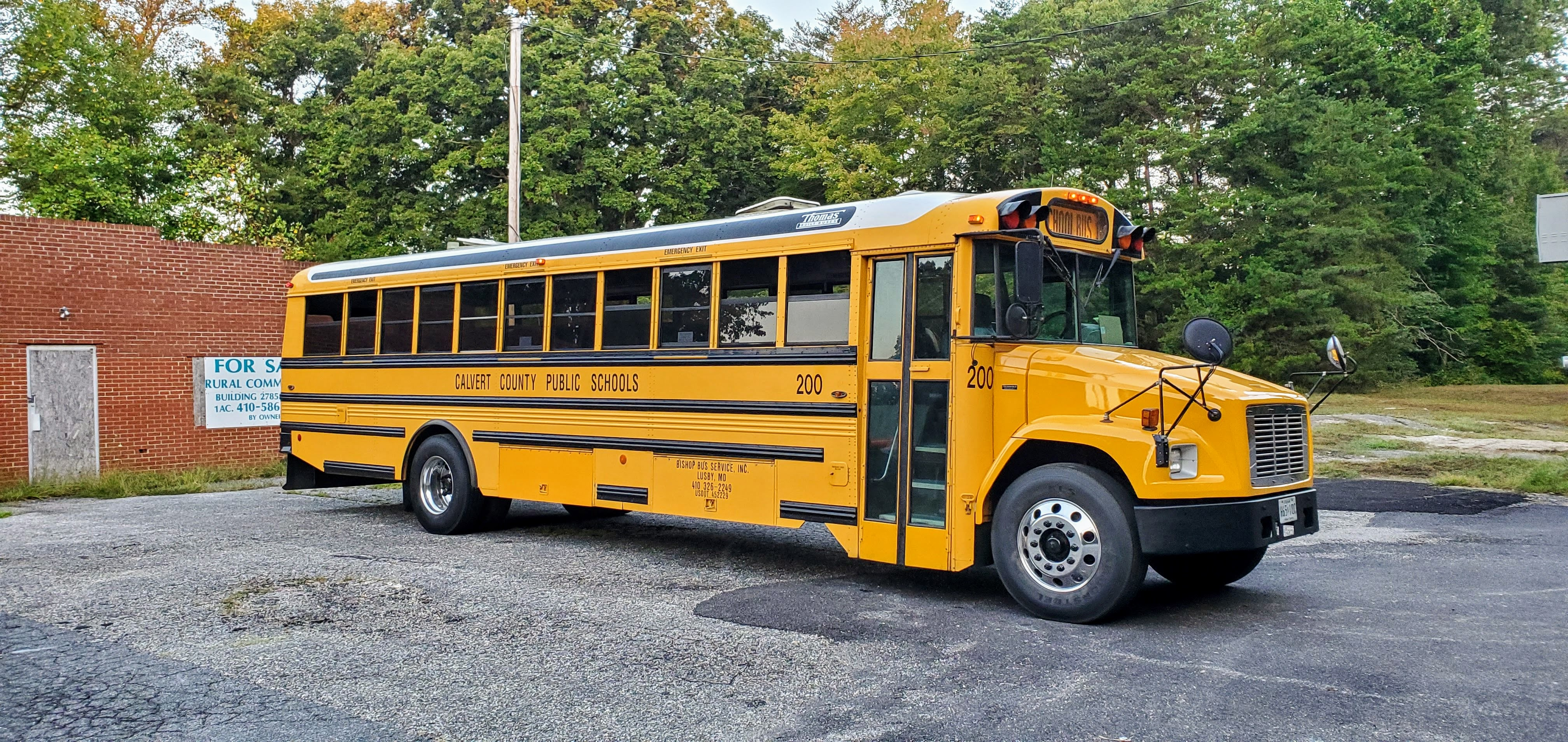
- 2004 Thomas Built Buses Saf-T-Liner FS-65 of Calvert County, Maryland

Overview
- Manufacturer: Freightliner Custom Chassis (Freightliner LLC)
- Production: January 1997 – December 2006
- Assembly: United States: Gaffney, South Carolina

Body and chassis
- Class: Type C (conventional)
- Layout: conventional 4x2
- Body styles: Cowled chassis: school bus; commercial bus; specialty vehicle
- Vehicles: see listing
- Related: Freightliner FL60

Powertrain
- Engines: Caterpillar 7.2 L 3126 I6; Caterpillar 7.2 L C7 I6; Cummins 5.9 L ISB I6; Mercedes-Benz 4.3 L OM 904 LA I4; Mercedes-Benz 4.8 L OM 924 LA I4; Mercedes-Benz 6.4 L OM 906 LA I6
- Transmissions: Fuller FS6305A 5-speed manual; Allison 2000 automatic; Allison 2500 automatic; Allison 3000 automatic; Allison AT545 automatic; Allison MD3060 automatic; Allison MT643 automatic

Dimensions
- Wheelbase: 150–276 in (3,810.0–7,010.4 mm)
- Curb weight: 18,000–35,000 lb (8,164.7–15,875.7 kg) (GVWR)

Chronology
- Predecessor: Ford B-Series (indirect)
- Successor: Freightliner C2

The Freightliner FS-65 is a cowled school bus chassis (conventional style) that was manufactured by Freightliner from 1997 to 2006. Derived from the Freightliner FL-Series medium-duty trucks, the FS-65 was produced primarily for school bus applications, though commercial-use buses and cutaway-cab buses were also built using the FS-65 chassis.

While developed by Freightliner before its acquisition of the Ford heavy-truck product range at the end of 1996 (and medium-duty truck lines were not included as part of the sale) the FS-65 would go on to serve as an indirect successor of the long-running Ford B-Series chassis. After 1998, Ford concentrated bus production towards van-derived chassis, leaving Freightliner to acquire much of the market share of full-size bus production owned by Ford.

The FS-65 chassis was assembled in Gaffney, South Carolina by the Freightliner Custom Chassis subsidiary of Freightliner; as an incomplete vehicle, the chassis was shipped to body manufacturers for final assembly of a bus. After a total of 62,764 units were produced, the final Freightliner FS-65 chassis rolled off the assembly line in September 2006, and was delivered on December 13, 2006 to O'Brien Bus Service, Inc. based out of Maryland.

== Model history ==
Last FS-65 Produced
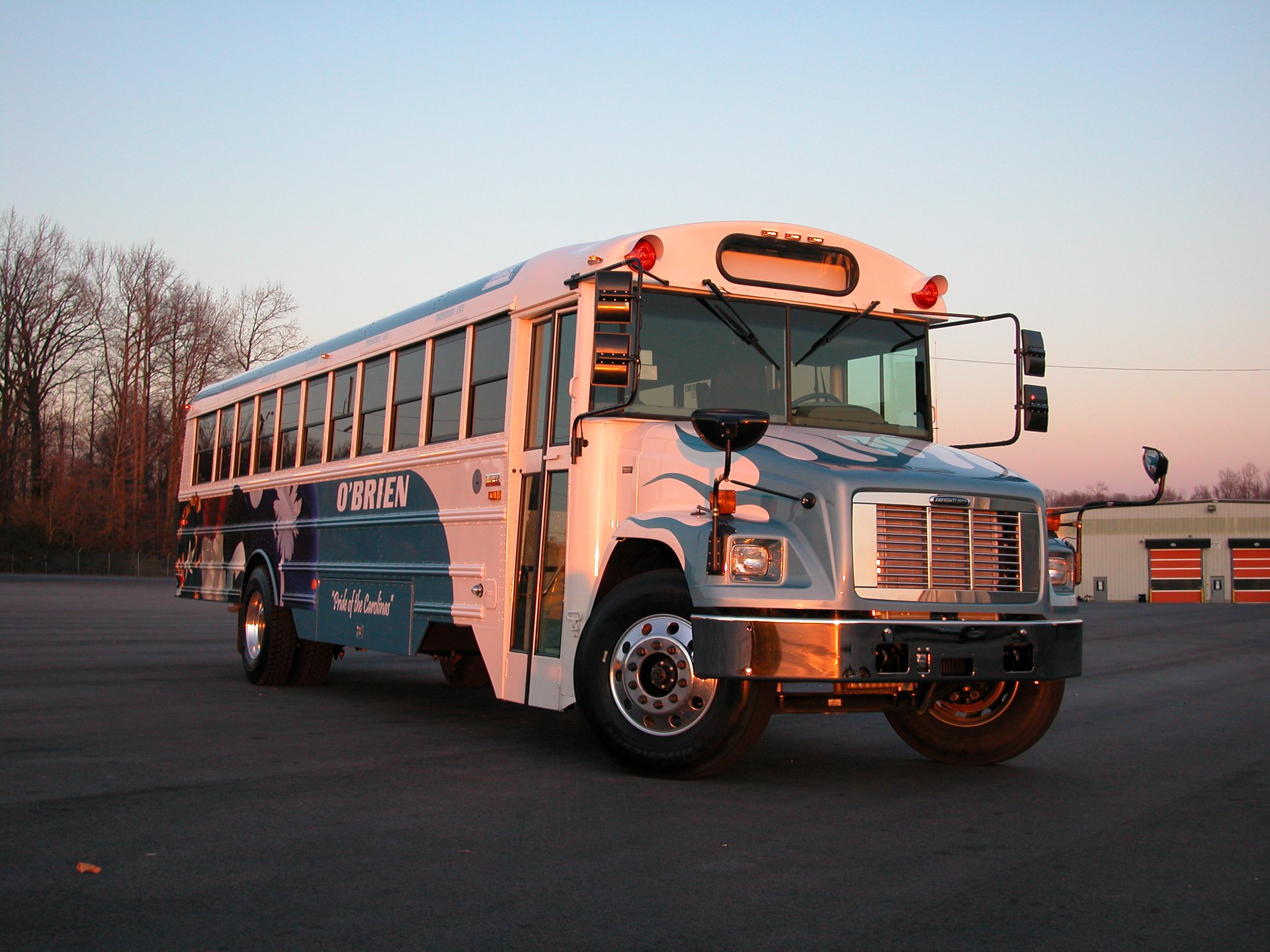

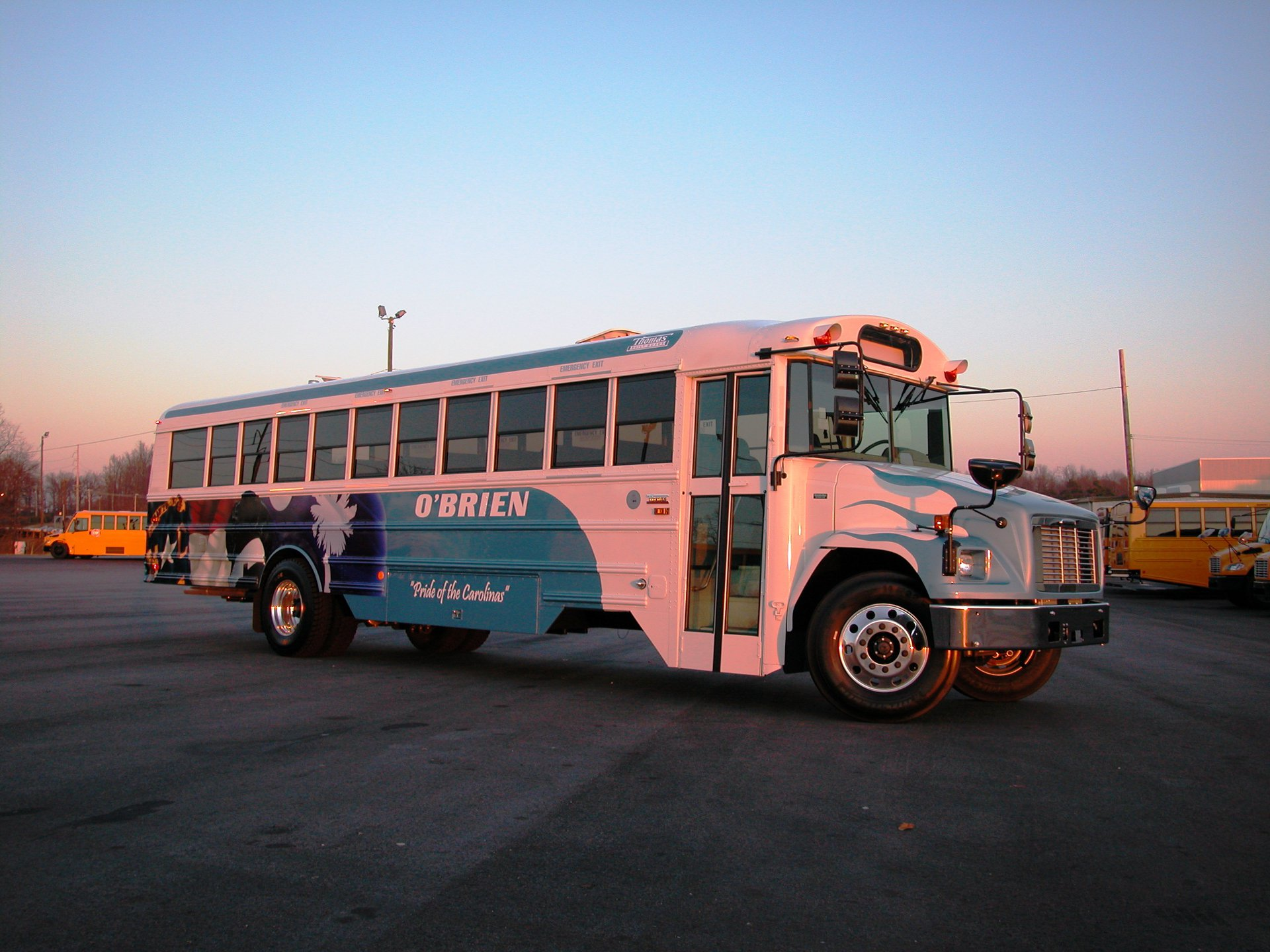
Thomas Built Buses FS-65. The last one produced in November 2006. Owned by O'Brien Bus Service, Inc. based out of Maryland.

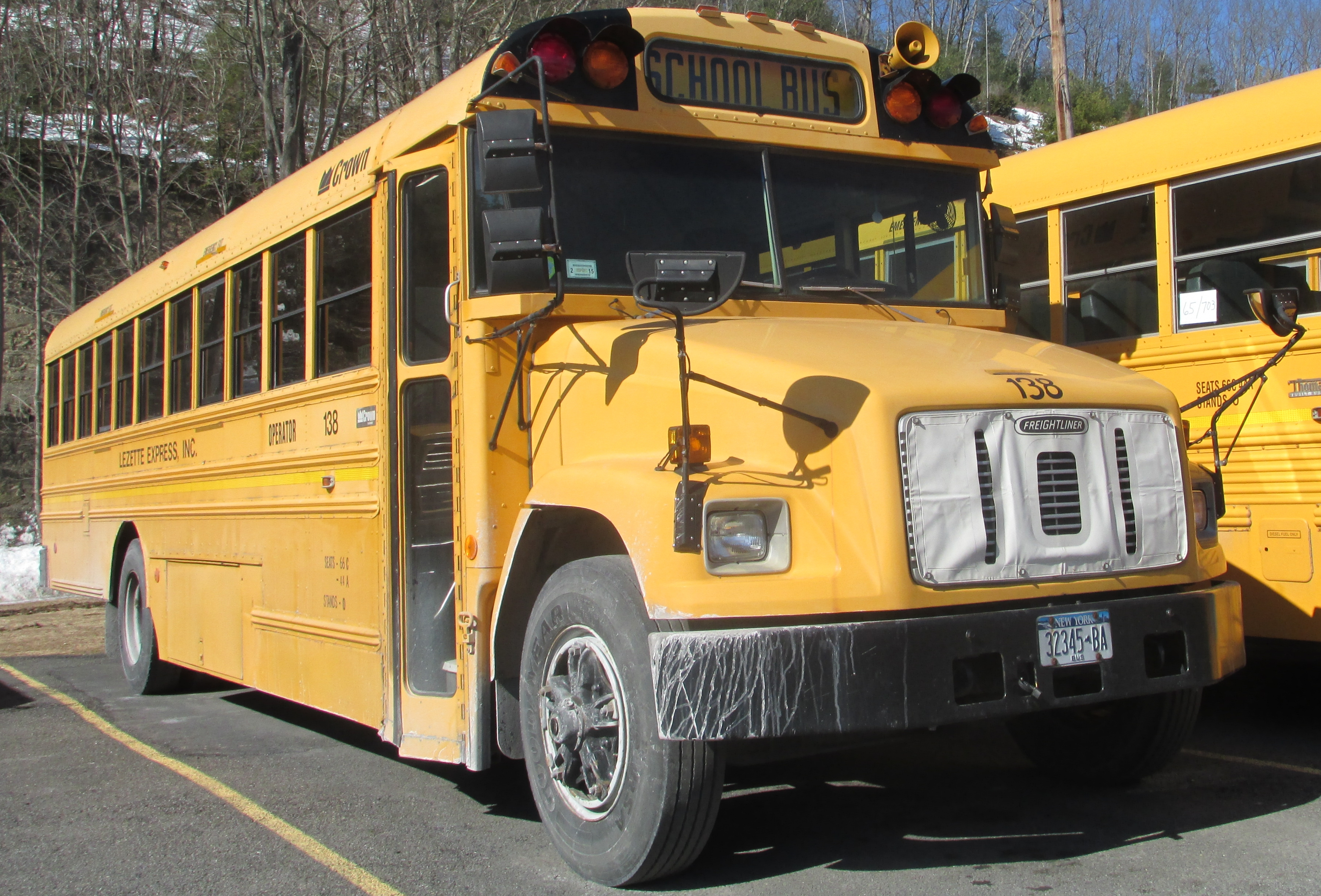
1997-1998 Crown by Carpenter body on an FS-65 chassis

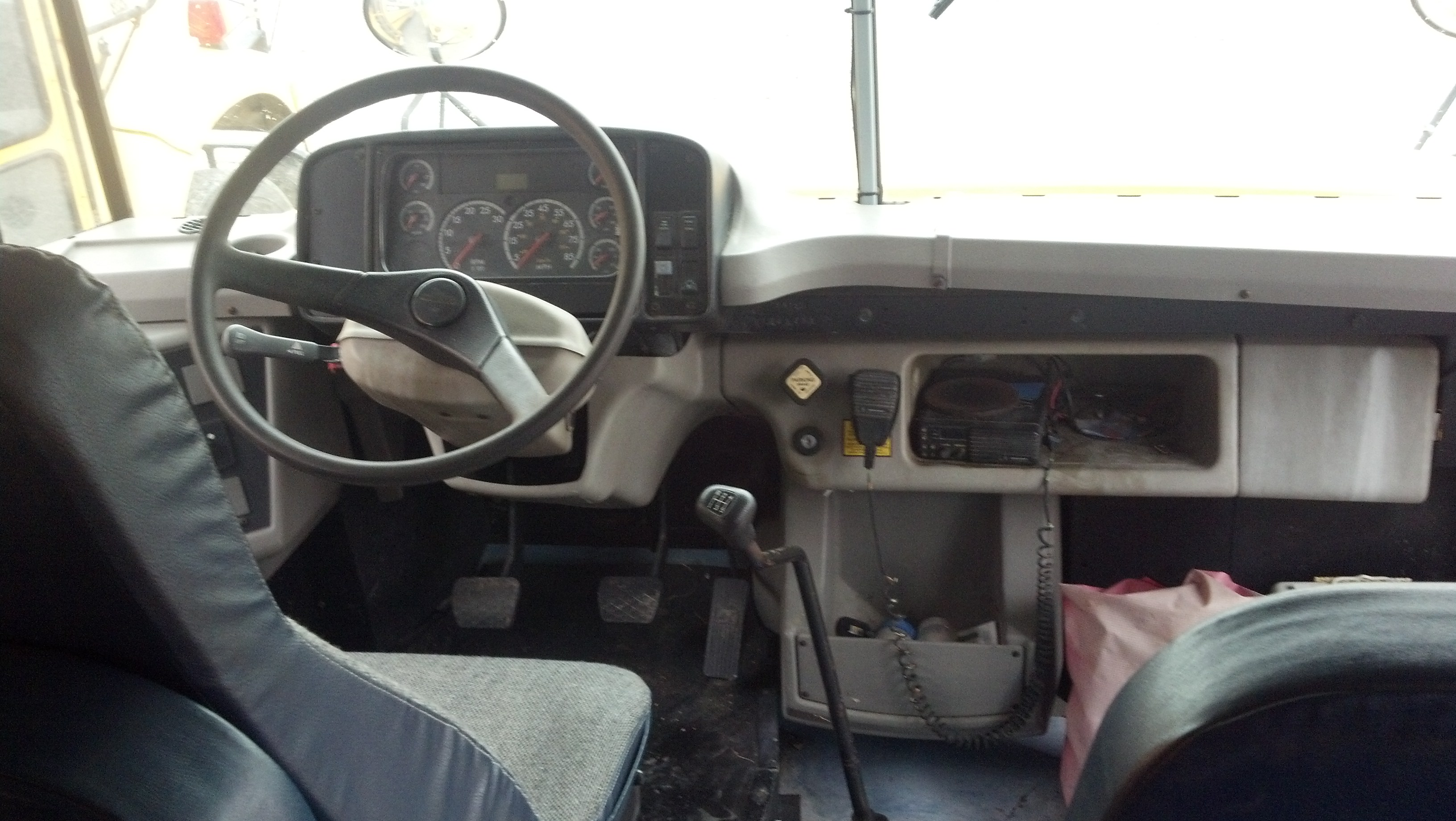
Freightliner FS-65 driver's compartment (manual transmission)

Following the 1991 introduction of the Business Class medium-duty trucks, Freightliner Trucks began development of a school bus chassis based upon the vehicle. In May 1996, the first prototype (with a Thomas body) was unveiled. The first completely new school bus chassis introduced since the 1980 redesign of the Ford B-Series, the Freightliner school bus chassis (later named the Freightliner FS-65) was scheduled for mid-1996 production; the first Freightliner bus rolled off the assembly line in January 1997.

The FS-65 distinguished itself from other school bus chassis by the standardization of hydraulic anti-lock brakes at the time of its introduction (two years before their requirement in 1998). In tandem with the sloped hood, to aid driver visibility, the design of the chassis used a raised platform for the driver's seat. Although the FS-65 was designed alongside Thomas Built Buses (a company which Freightliner acquired in 1998), the Freightliner chassis was made available to other body manufacturers. As a result of the driver's platform, many bus bodies saw revisions to their designs to accommodate the FS-65 chassis, including windshield redesigns or the standardization of high-headroom bodies.

During its production run, the FS-65 chassis saw relatively few changes. For 2002, the Mercedes-Benz MBE900 diesel engines were added to the powertrain line as an option. For 2004, the Caterpillar 3126 became the Caterpillar C7 (as part of an emissions upgrade). A redesign of the instrument panel adopted a new instrument cluster, shared with the M2 and Sterling trucks.

In 2002, Freightliner introduced the second-generation Business Class, the M2. In 2004, the Thomas Saf-T-Liner C2 was introduced as the school bus variant of the M2. Sold alongside the C2, the FS-65 remained in production into the 2007 model year (although the last bus was a 2008 model); the final Thomas school bus based on the FS-65 was produced in November 2006.

The 2006 discontinuation of the FS-65 marked the end of the FL-Series (alongside its severe-service variants), as medium-duty production ended after 2004.

== Body manufacturers ==
At its 1997 launch, the FS-65 was widely available to manufacturers throughout the industry with a notable exception. AmTran never offered the chassis with its bus body (as the company was owned by Navistar International, one of the largest competitors of Freightliner).

Following the 2001 closure of Carpenter and the 2002 withdrawal of Corbeil from full-size bus production, Blue Bird ended the use of Freightliner chassis (in favor of a proprietary chassis, the Vision), leaving Freightliner subsidiary Thomas Built Buses the sole user of the FS-65 chassis for school bus production.

Freightliner FS-65 body manufacturers
Body Manufacturer	Blue Bird Corporation	Crown By Carpenter (later Carpenter Industries, Inc.)	Les Enterprises Michel Corbeil, Inc.	Thomas Built Buses
Model Name	Conventional	Classic (Crown by Carpenter) Classic 2000 (Carpenter)	Conventional	Thomas/Freightliner Saf-T-Liner FS-65
Production	1997–2002	1997–2001	1997–2002	1997–2006
Notes	Discontinued in 2002.	Crown by Carpenter Classic: four-piece windshield Carpenter Classic 2000: two-piece windshield (only version sold in that configuration)	Corbeil/Freightliner buses were sold only in Canada.	After 2002, the FS-65 was sold only with a Thomas body. Sold alongside Thomas Saf-T-Liner C2 after 2004.

== Powertrain ==
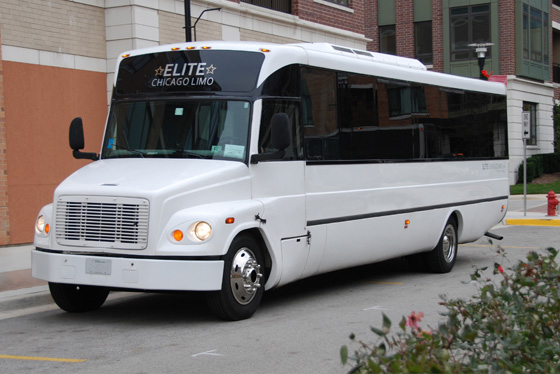
Freightliner commercial bus (with a party/limo bus body)

The Freightliner FS-65 is notable as the first all-new school bus chassis in North America sold exclusively with diesel engines. Initially available with Caterpillar and Cummins diesel engines (shared with the Saf-T-Liner transits), in 2002, the FS-65 introduced the Mercedes-Benz MBE 900 diesels as an option.

An Allison 2000 automatic transmission was the standard transmission sold with the FS-65, with the Allison MD3060 as an option. A rarely-ordered option included a Fuller 5-speed manual transmission, making the FS-65 one of the last school buses sold with a manual transmission.

Freightliner FS-65 powertrain
Engine	Configuration	Production	Fuel	Output	Transmission
CAT 3126 /C7	7.2 L inline-6	1997–2006	Diesel	190–250 hp	5-speed Fuller FS6305A manual and Allison 545 automatic
Cummins ISB	5.9 L inline-6	1997–2002	Diesel	185–250 hp	Allison 2000 and MD3060 automatic
Mercedes-Benz OM 900 Series	4.3L inline-4 (OM 904 LA) 6.4L inline-6 (OM 906 LA)	2002–2006	Diesel	OM 904 LA: 190 hp OM 906 LA: 190–250 hp	Allison 2000 and MD3060 automatic

== See also ==
- Freightliner Trucks - chassis manufacturer
- Thomas Built Buses - primary body manufacturer
- School Bus
- List of buses
