= Caterpillar 3126 =

1997 diesel engine

Overview
- Manufacturer: Caterpillar Inc.
- Also called: 3126B, 3126E
- Production: 1995-2003

Layout
- Configuration: I6
- Displacement: 7,242 cubic centimetres (441.9 cu in)
- Cylinder bore: 110 millimetres (4.3 in)
- Piston stroke: 127 millimetres (5.0 in)
- Compression ratio: 16:1 - 17.25:1 (varies by model)

Combustion
- Fuel type: Diesel

Dimensions
- Length: up to 1,184 millimetres (46.6 in)
- Width: up to 937 millimetres (36.9 in)
- Height: up to 927 millimetres (36.5 in)

Chronology
- Predecessor: 3116
- Successor: C7

The Caterpillar 3126 is a turbocharged 7.2 L inline 6-cylinder diesel engine manufactured by Caterpillar and first introduced in 1995; it was the first electronic mid-range diesel engine that Caterpillar produced. It is the successor to the Caterpillar 3116 engine and was updated to become the Caterpillar C7 engine in 2003. It is a medium-duty engine and has been used in dump trucks, long haul trucks, ambulances, buses, RVs, boats, cranes, fire trucks, and more. In 1998, Caterpillar released an improved version, the 3126B. In 2002, the 3126E was released, though these improved versions only affected engine electronics, not the actual engine design. Caterpillar launched a three-tier system of overhaul kits for the 3126 and its C7 successor in 2011.

It was rated for multiple power and torque applications from 170–420 hp (130–310 kW) and 420 lb⋅ft (570 N⋅m) to 860 lb⋅ft (1,170 N⋅m).
