= Ward Body Works =

Defunct American school bus manufacturer

Ward Body Works, Inc.
- Type: Family-owned
- Industry: Transportation
- Founded: 1933
- Founder: D.H. Ward
- Defunct: 1980, (company) 1992, (brand by successor AmTran from 1980 to 1992)
- Fate: Chapter 11 Bankruptcy; Re-organized as American Transportation Corporation
- Successor: American Transportation Corporation (AmTran)
- Headquarters: Conway, Arkansas, U.S.
- Number of locations: 2 (Conway, Arkansas and Beaver Falls, Pennsylvania)
- Area served: United States
- Products: School Buses; Commercial Buses

Ward Body Works, Inc. (also known as Ward Industries and Ward School Bus Manufacturing, Inc.) was an American bus manufacturer. Headquartered in Conway, Arkansas, Ward specialized in yellow school buses, alongside buses for other uses. Founded in 1933 by D.H. "Dave" Ward, the company was family-owned for nearly its entire existence.

Among several innovations, Ward was the first manufacturer to perform a rollover test on a school bus, leading to changes in school bus body design. In another industry first, Ward was the first manufacturer to assemble buses on an assembly line.

In 1980, Ward filed for bankruptcy and was reorganized as American Transportation Corporation (AmTran), keeping the Ward brand name in use on school buses. In 1991, AmTran was acquired by Navistar International, leading to the retirement of the Ward brand name during 1992. The company currently exists as the IC Bus subsidiary of International (the successor of AmTran).

== History ==
=== 1933–1945 ===
D. H. "Dave" Ward founded Ward Body Works in Conway, Arkansas, in 1933 when he "lowered the roof of a wooden bus for Mr. Carl Brady of the Southside Schools". Southside Schools were located about 15 miles north of Conway. A blacksmith by trade, Ward grew his business primarily on body repair of bus bodies in the area.

In 1936, Ward manufactured his first bus body, building all-metal school buses for schools in Hermitage and Greenbrier, Arkansas (south and north of Conway, respectively). In contrast to modern buses, the first Ward school buses featured removable safety-glass windows and perimeter and center-mounted seating. In April 1939, the school bus industry collaborated with education experts, leading to the adoption of universal design and manufacturing standards; along with the introduction of school bus yellow as a paint color, other standards included forward-facing seating, a center aisle, and a rear emergency exit door.

In 1939, Ward Body Works ended its blacksmith-related operations to focus entirely on manufacturing bus bodies. To expand production, the company opened a 10,000 square-foot factory in downtown Conway.

During World War II, Ward shifted to wartime production, supplying buses for the military and maintenance for US Army trucks. In a contract shared with Thomas Car Works, Ward built over 1000 bodies of various types for the GMC CCKW cargo truck.

=== 1945–1950s ===
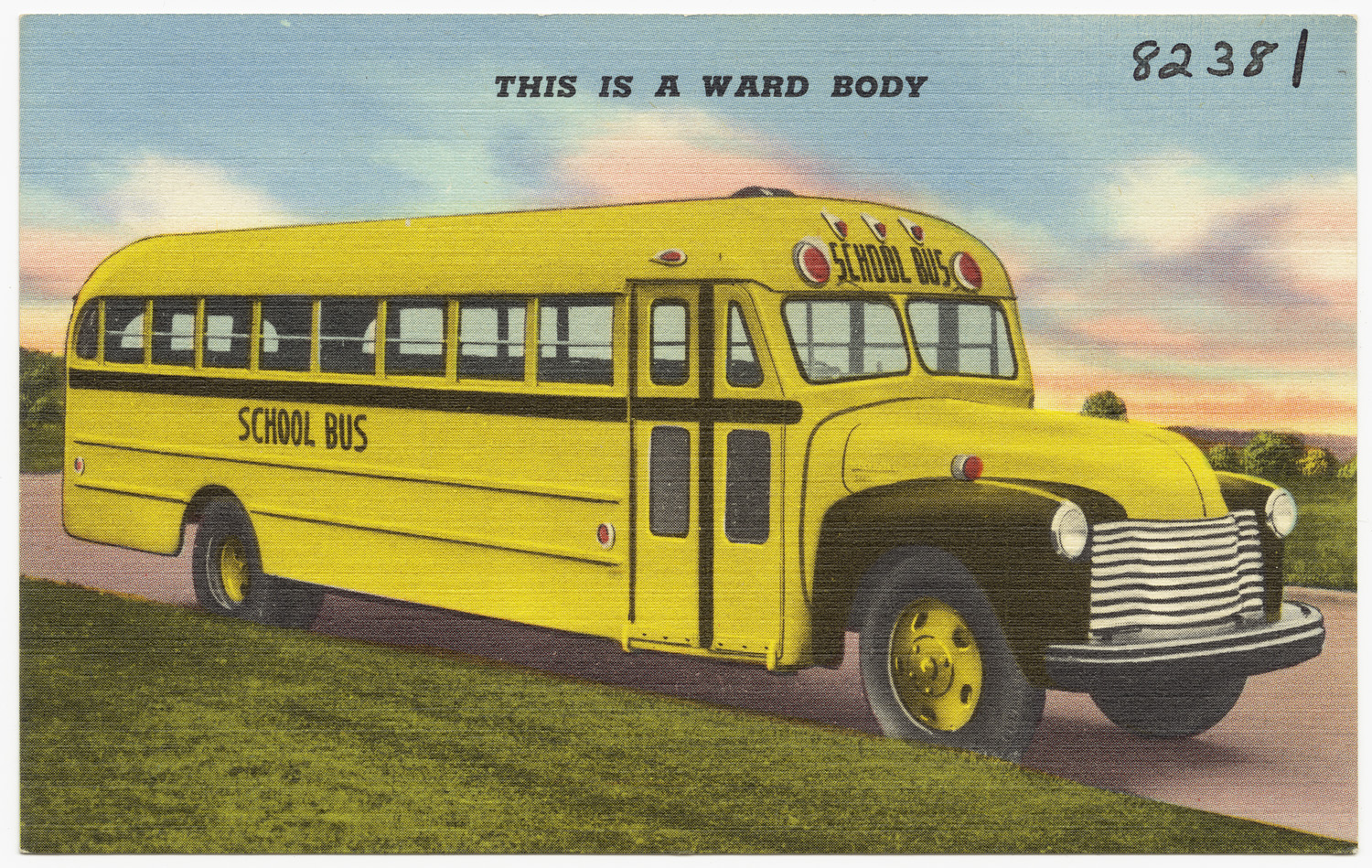
Late 1940s Ward conventional body on Chevrolet 6100 cowled chassis

Following World War II, Ward sought ways to ensure year-round production for the company factory. Along with expanding sales outside of the southeastern United States, the company became one of the first manufacturers to expand outside of the United States, as it opened a satellite facility in Mexico City in February 1947; at the same time, the Conway factory was expanded to 100,000 square feet. For sales in Mexico, Ward supplied prefabricated (CKD) bodies to be assembled in Mexico City on locally supplied chassis. In 1948, the company produced over $1.6 million of buses.

In March 1951, Ward opened a factory in Austin, Texas; the 71,600 square foot facility was introduced for production of school buses for Texas and the western United States, along with export production. In 1954, operations in Mexico were closed, with the company citing complexities in exporting and manufacturing CKD-based vehicles, with the Austin factory effectively taking its place.

In 1954, Ward Body Works opened a second factory in Conway, as it moved from its downtown facility to a 114,000 square foot facility with direct rail and highway access (US 65), allowing easier vehicle shipment. Assembly line operations were moved to the new factory; in March 1957, the company moved its tool-and die operations, shifting all production to the new factory. In addition to body jigs and fixtures, the 1,500 foot-long assembly line featured 14 resistance welders, 75 arc welders, and an inert gas welder. At any given time, up to 45 bus bodies could be on the assembly line, with the company averaging 100 finished bodies per week.

In the early 1950s, Ward built its first transit-style school bus, with the company expanding beyond its school bus product lines later in the decade, as it added mass-transit and sightseeing buses to its product lineup.

==== Company diversification ====
In 1952, Dave Ward became the owner and founder of Eagle Printing and Lithographing Company and opened a printing plant. In 1956, Ward became both a body manufacturer and an industry supplier, as the company created two subsidiaries. C.S. Sash Company, was an aluminum window frame manufacturer for the company, ultimately becoming a industry-wide supplier. Company expertise with bending steel tubing was used in the establishment of Ward School Furniture, assembling steel and wood desks and tables for the educational sector.

By the end of the decade, Ward sold off its School Furniture subsidiary, maintaining its window supplier.

=== 1960s ===
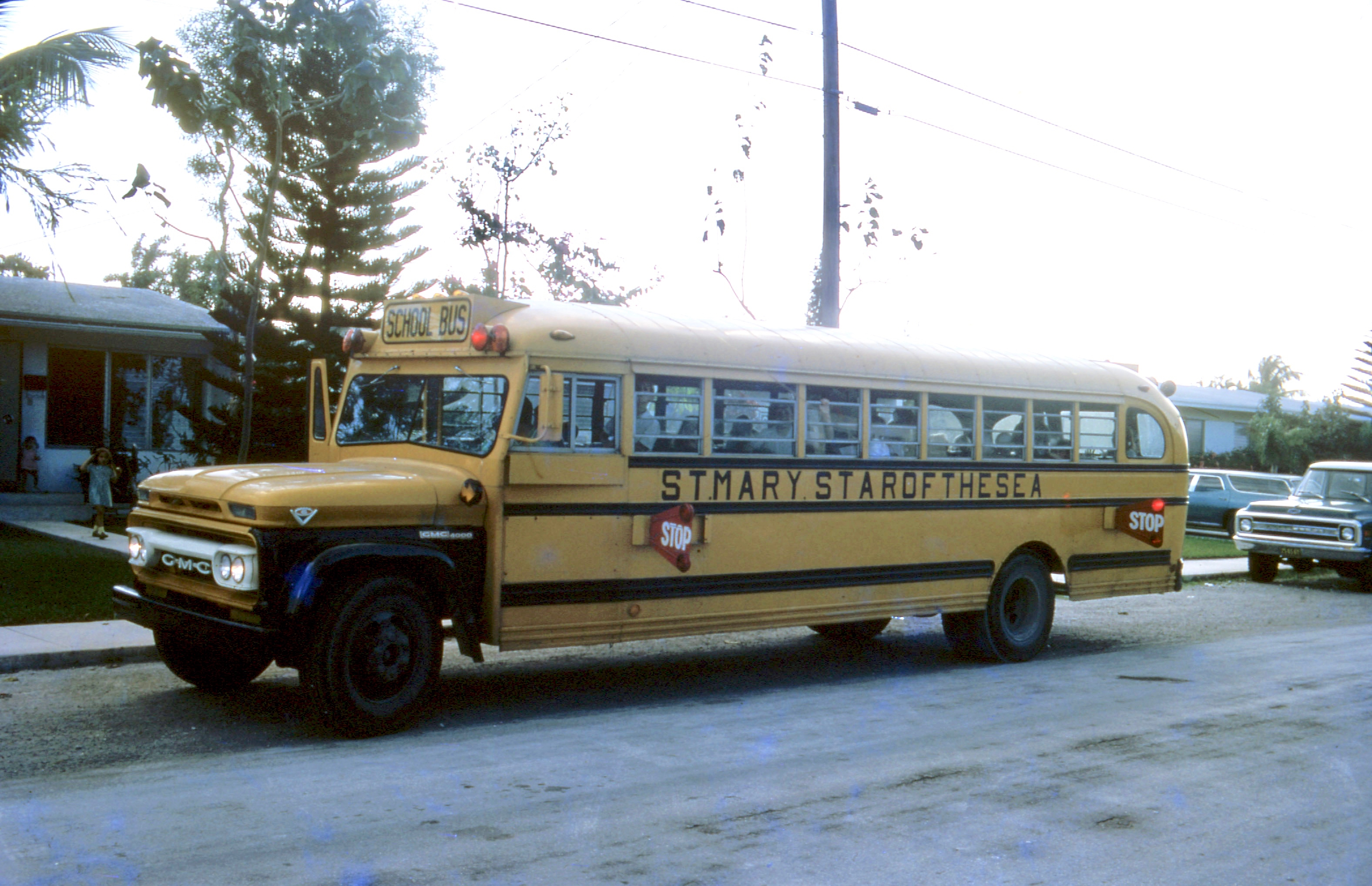
Mid 1960s GMC Ward conventional in Florida

In the 1960s, Ward Body Works began a series of updates that would modernize manufacturing and production. To catalog the various state and local regulations affecting school bus specifications, in 1964, company owner Charles Ward set up a computer mainframe (using IBM 360s). In the same year, Ward performed the first independent rollover test on a school bus, discovering issues related to structural integrity.

During 1967, the assembly line in the Conway facility was upgraded to a moving assembly line, a first in the bus industry.

In 1968, Dave Ward retired from company leadership, with son Charles Ward adopting operations; in 1969, Charles and his brother Stephen Ward founded data processing company Demographics, Inc. (today, Acxiom).

In 1969, Ward published a Rivet Survey, along with comparing the number of rivets used in school bus body joints (ranging from 232 to 4,000 per body design), the study also published the results and recommendations from the 1964 rollover crash test performed by the company. In 1969, subsidiary CS Sash was reorganized as Surelite, expanding its production from window frames into insulated and laminated glass, along with composite interior components and bus heaters.

=== 1970s ===
In 1970, Ward ended operations in Austin and relocated secondary assembly to an all-new facility in Beaver Falls, Pennsylvania (in suburban Pittsburgh). The company expanded into small bus production as it acquired the assets of Dallas, Texas-based manufacturer Coachette, continuing production in Conway on Chevrolet P30 chassis.

In 1973, Ward Body Works was legally reorganized as Ward School Bus Manufacturing, Inc.; at the time, Ward was the largest school bus manufacturer in the United States, holding a 25% market share. As the company further explored computer-based manufacturing, the assembly line at the main Conway facility was upgraded and connected to an IBM 370 mainframe. The Ward conventional bus underwent a major redesign for 1973, becoming the Ward Volunteer; aside from a redesigned windshield, taller roof, and an updated chassis, the Ward Volunteer shares many parts of its design with the current-generation IC CE-Series produced today. The Volunteer formed the basis of the President transit-style bus, as Ward moved from a rear-engine to a front-engine configuration.

In 1976, Ward produced a prototype for the first full-size school bus with front-wheel drive, but the company was forced to abandon the project before producing the vehicle.

== Company closure ==
By the end of the 1970s, school bus production in the United States had declined from 20 manufacturers to 8 (with Blue Bird, Carpenter, Superior, Thomas, Ward, and Wayne producing vehicles for the entire United States; Crown Coach and Gillig specialized in production primarily for the West Coast). At the end of the decade, the end of the baby boomer generation was completing its secondary education, leading to a decrease in school population for the 1980s. Alongside the volatile economy of the time, manufacturers faced a long-term decline in demand for production; in 1975, the company ended production at its Pennsylvania factory, moving all assembly to Conway.

Of the six major manufacturers, Ward encountered the worst financial issues, as the company was over $20 million in debt by 1980. On July 25, 1980 (a week after shutting down production in Conway), Ward School Bus Manufacturing filed for Chapter 11 bankruptcy (claiming essentially no cash on hand). In August 1980, the assets of Ward Industries were purchased by an investment group assisted by the then-Arkansas Governor Bill Clinton, allowing production to restart in Conway on August 21, 1980 (returning 1,100 people to work). In the successor company, the Wards had no involvement with bus production, but Stephen Ward continued on in a vehicle distribution role. In 1981, the holding company that purchased Ward was officially reorganized as American Transportation Corporation (AmTran); to utilize the previous market recognition, AmTran continued to brand its school buses under the Ward name.

During the 1980s, the AmTran product line underwent a series of evolution. The Coachette-derived buses were retired before 1980, with AmTran developing designs of its own. In 1985, the company introduced the Vanguard cutaway-chassis bus (at 23 passengers, the largest-capacity design of the time). In 1986, the Ward Patriot semi-forward conventional was introduced; using a modified GMC B6000 chassis, the Patriot placed the driver further forward with a larger windshield. In 1990, the long-running President was replaced by the Ward Senator, an all-new design using an International chassis.

At the end of 1990, Navistar acquired a one-third stake of AmTran, an option to purchase the remaining portion of the company was carried out in 1995. As part of the 1990 purchase, AmTran nearly doubled production in Conway; along with assembling bus bodies, the company also began production of bus chassis (sourced from International). In 1992, AmTran (which had used its name on commercial buses since 1981) began to phase out the Ward name on school buses, as the Ward Senator became the AmTran Genesis (the Ward Patriot was retired altogether); the Ward Volunteer and Ward Vanguard became AmTran buses for 1993 production.

In 2002, Navistar began to phase out the AmTran brand name for its bus production. To better emphasize the integrated corporate production of its model lines, Navistar changed the name of AmTran to IC Corporation, today IC Bus (IC = Integrated Coach).

== Products ==
Ward Body Works product line (before 1980)
Model Name	Production	Vehicle type	Chassis	Notes
Coachette	c.1973–1980?	Type B (integrated)	General Motors: Chevrolet P30	The Coachette was a Type B school bus sold by Ward after it acquired Coachette.
Volunteer	1973–1980	Type C (conventional)	Chrysler Corporation: Dodge D-300 (1973–1977); General Motors: Chevrolet/GMC B-Series; Ford Motor Company: Ford B-600/B-700/B-800/B-8000; International Harvester: International Loadstar 1703/1803 (1973–1978); International S-1700/S-1800 (1978–1980)	The Volunteer was an all-new body redesign introduced by Ward for 1973.; Minor updates were given in 1980, 1986, and 1988.; Following the dissolution of the Ward brand, the Volunteer remained in production as an AmTran.
President	c.1975–1980	Type D (transit-style): front engine	International Harvester: International 1853FC (1975–1980)	The President was the Ward counterpart of the Blue Bird All American and Thomas Saf-T-Liner. However, it was only built in a front-engine configuration.; In 1976, Ward built a prototype derived from body of the President. Using a modified IHC chassis, it was the first front-wheel drive school bus; it did not enter production.

=== Company timeline ===
Ward Body Works timeline (1961–1980)
	1960s									1970s										1980s
	'61	'62	'63	'64	'65	'66	'67	'68	'69	'70	'71	'72	'73	'74	'75	'76	'77	'78	'79	'80
Bus type	Ward school buses
Type B													Coachette
Type C	Conventional												Volunteer
Type D	FC/RE
Type D															President

== See also ==
- AmTran - direct successor
- IC Bus - successor to AmTran
