= Ford B series =

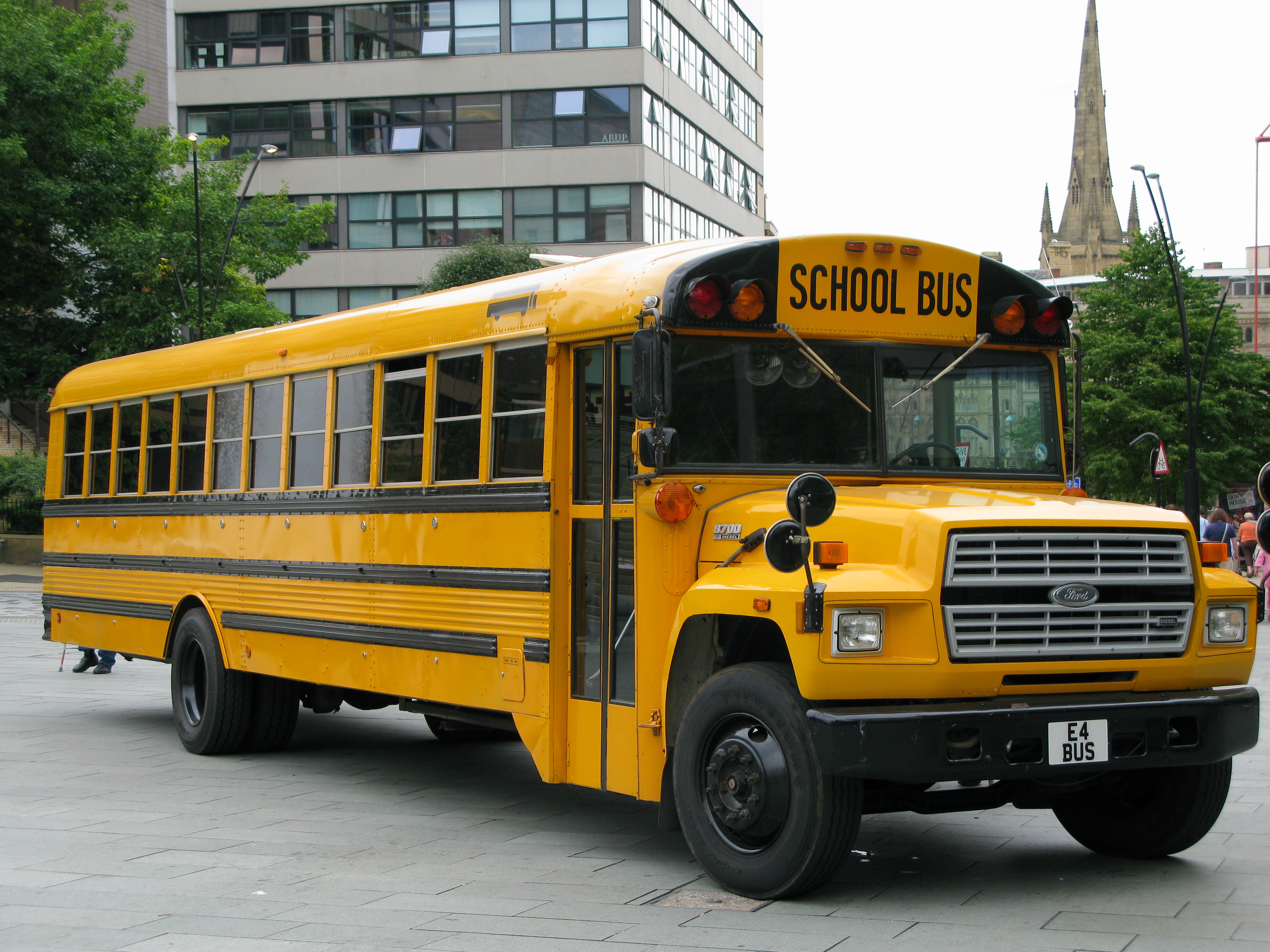
- Sixth-generation Ford B-series (1985–1994 Ford B700 with Thomas Saf-T-Liner conventional body)

Overview
- Manufacturer: Ford
- Also called: Mercury MB series (1948–1968; Canada)
- Production: 1948–1998

Body and chassis
- Class: Class 6 (medium duty)
- Layout: Cowled chassis 4x2
- Body styles: school bus; commercial bus
- Platform: Ford F-series (medium duty truck)
- Related: Ford F-Series (ninth generation)

Powertrain
- Engines: 8.2L Detroit Diesel V8 Diesel; 6.1L Ford 370 V8; 10.4L Caterpillar 3208 V8 Diesel; 5.9L Cummins 6BT I6 Diesel; 8.3L Cummins C8.3 I6 Diesel; 6.6L Ford-New Holland I6 Diesel; 7.8L Ford-New Holland I6 Diesel
- Transmission: Ford Motor Company 4-speed Automatic or 5-Speed Manual

Chronology
- Predecessor: 1941 Ford truck chassis
- Successor: Freightliner FS-65 (indirect); Blue Bird Vision (indirect)

The Ford B series is a bus chassis that was manufactured by Ford Motor Company from 1948 to 1998. A variant of the medium-duty Ford F-Series, the B-series was developed for bus use. Alongside its sales in the United States and Canada, the chassis was exported worldwide for various manufacturers.

In contrast to the F-Series chassis-cab truck, the B-Series was a cowled-chassis vehicle: a bare chassis aft of the firewall, with all other bodywork supplied from a second-stage manufacturer. While primarily adopted for yellow school bus applications, the B series also saw various specialty uses.

Coinciding with the late 1996 sale of the Louisville/AeroMax heavy-truck line to Freightliner (which led to the introduction of Sterling Trucks), Ford ended cowled-chassis vehicle production after 1998. Though Ford has remained in the medium-duty segment (introducing the F-650/F-750 Super Duty for 2000), the company has not since developed a cowled-chassis derivative of the model line, instead concentrating on cutaway chassis vehicles. The role and market share of the B-series in the cowled-chassis segment was largely superseded by the Freightliner FS-65 and the Blue Bird Vision (a proprietary chassis paired with a body from its manufacturer).

== Overview ==
For 1948, Ford released the F-series truck line, moving all truck production to a dedicated model family. The B series (B= Bus) was introduced as a cowled-chassis variant of the medium-duty F-5 and F-6 (1 ½ and 2-ton), slotted between pickup trucks and "Big Job" heavy conventionals.

For 1953, the second generation F-Series shifted to a three-digit model nomenclature (which remains in use by Ford today), with the B-series following suit. In 1968, Ford introduced diesel-fuel engines as an option, denoting such vehicles with a four-digit model number (this nomenclature ended for 1991).

Prior to 1969, Ford of Canada marketed the B-Series through both Ford and its Lincoln-Mercury dealer networks, with the latter selling it as part of the Mercury M-series truck line. At the time, rural Canadian communities had access to either a Ford or a Lincoln-Mercury dealership, but not both concurrently.

For its entire 50-year production run, the B-series paralleled the medium-duty F series in its development. Until 1966, medium-duty F-Series trucks differed from their lighter-duty counterparts primarily in their frame and front suspension design, retaining front bodywork commonality. For 1967, Ford medium-duty trucks were given wider front axles and their own front bodywork, with the B-Series using this design entirely. For 1980, a final generation was produced (undergoing a model revision in 1995).

== First generation (1948–1952) ==
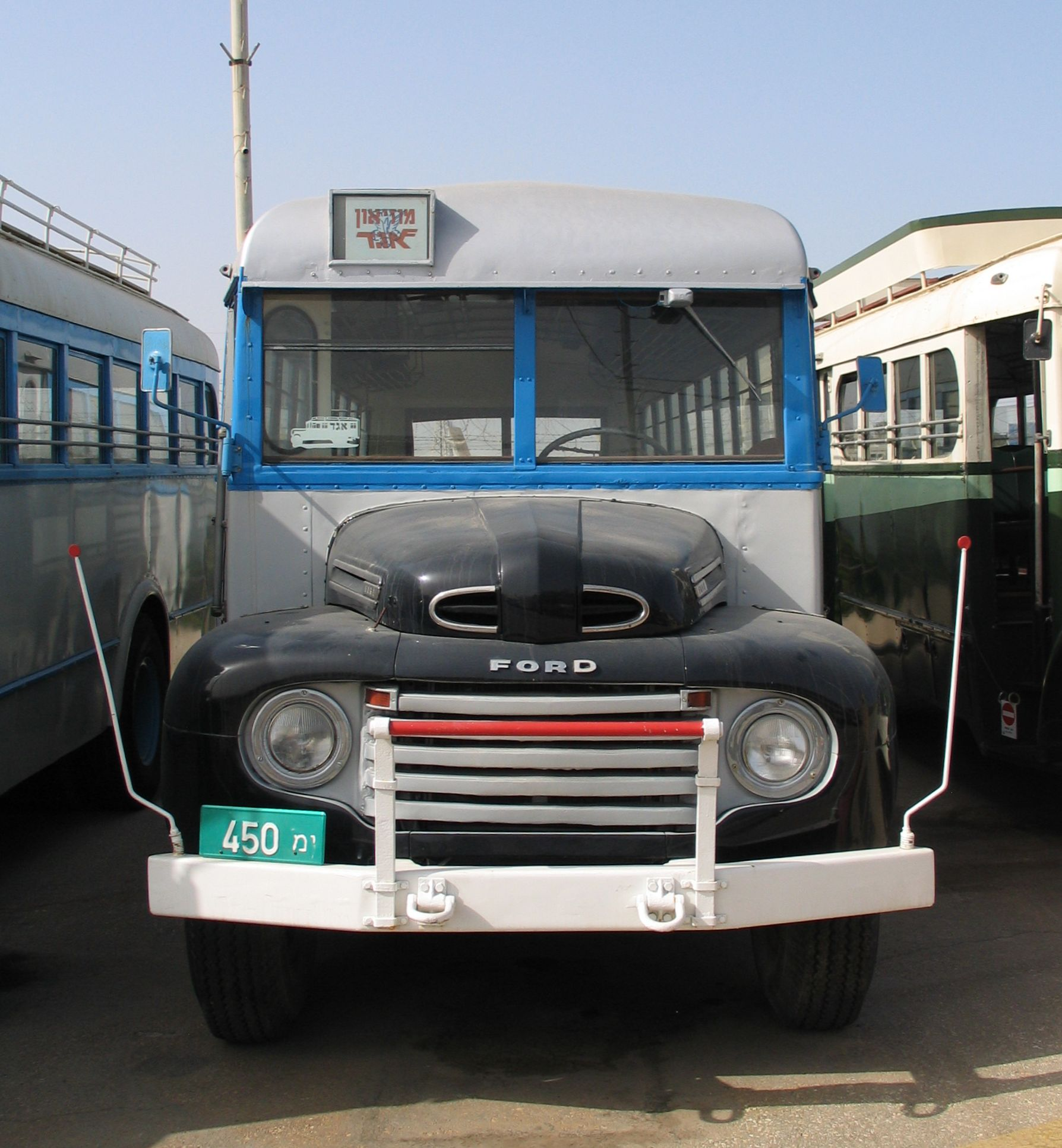
1948–1951 B series located in Israel

For 1948, as Ford introduced the Ford F-series as its first dedicated truck platform, the B-series made its debut. Based on the medium-duty F-5 and F-6 (1½ and 2-ton), the B series was slotted between the pickup trucks and the "Big Job" conventionals. In 1951, the grille trim was redesigned, with the horizontal grille bars replaced by wider-spread vertical ones.

Sharing the engines with the F-5 and F6, a 95 hp 226 inline 6 was standard, with a 100 hp Flathead V8 and a 110 hp 254 inline-six as options.

Engine name	Configuration	Production	Fuel	Transmission
Rouge I6	226 cu in (3.7 L) OHV I6	1948–1953	gasoline	3-speed manual 4-speed manual
Rouge I6	254 cu in (4.2 L) OHV I6	1948–1953	gasoline	3-speed manual 4-speed manual
Flathead V8	239 cu in (3.9 L) side-valve V8	1948–1953	gasoline	3-speed manual 4-speed manual

== Second generation (1953–1956) ==
In 1953, Ford celebrated their 50th anniversary and the B series saw a redesign with new B-"00" designations added to the name. The redesign implemented a set back front axle that made the front look nose heavy, but allowed for a tighter turning radius. The hood was also longer and flowed into the fenders. The grille was still horizontal, but was two bars as opposed to the one large one in the previous model. 1954 buses received a refreshed grille and a new OHV V8 engine option to replace the old 239 Flathead V8. The 1956 buses got a new wraparound windshield and restyled dashboards as well as a new grille that was similar to the 1953 model year.

Engines

- 215 cu in (3.5 L) OHV I6 (1953)
- 239 cu in (3.9 L) Flathead V8 (1953)
- 223 cu in (3.7 L) OHV "Mileage Maker" I6 (1954–1956)
- 239 cu in (3.9 L) Ford Y-Block OHV V8 (1954–1955)
- 272 cu in (4.5 L) Ford Y-Block OHV V8 (1956)

== Third generation (1957–1960) ==
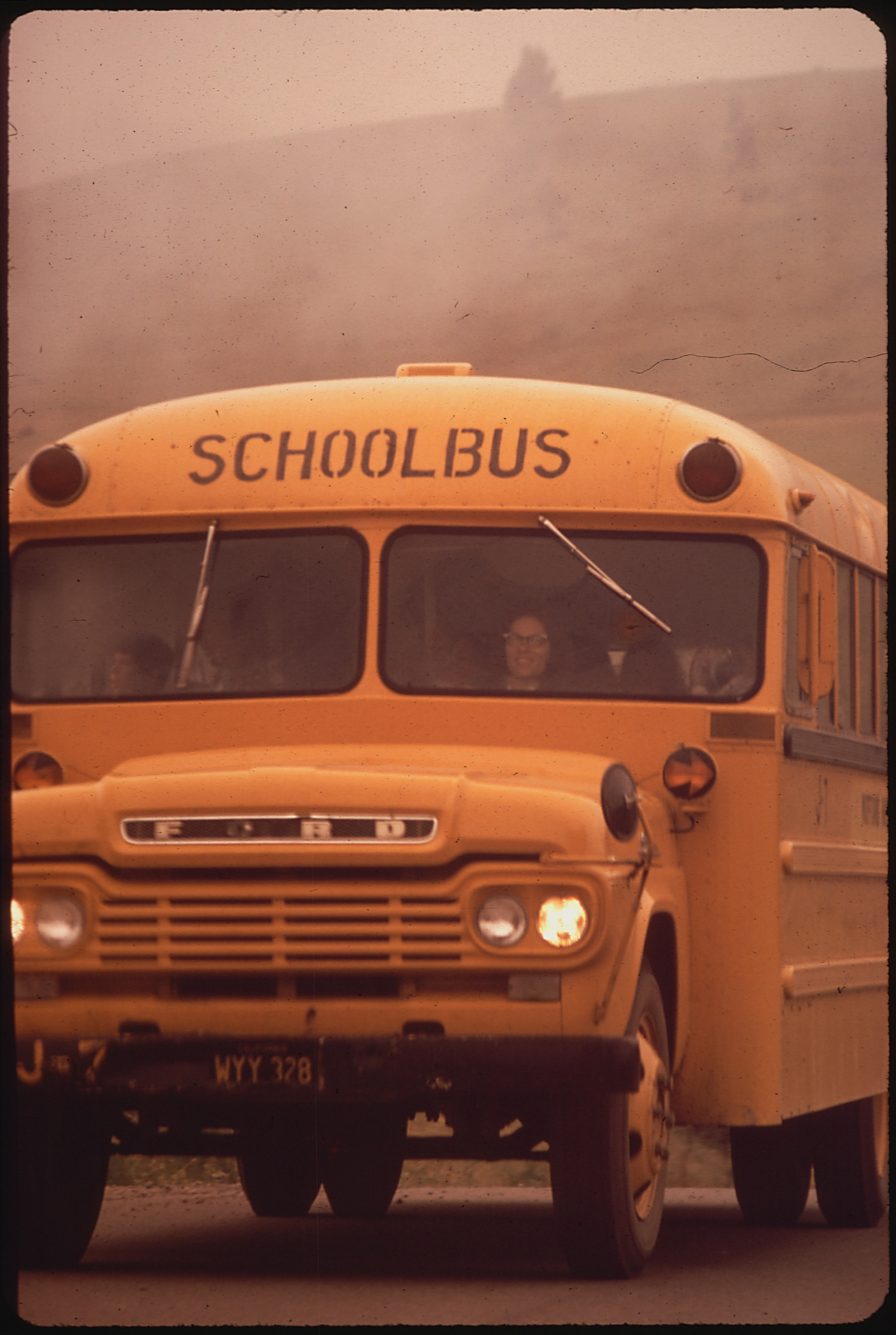
1958–1960 Ford-chassis school bus in California

In 1957 the B series got a redesigned front end and a new dash area. The front hood was now flush with the fenders creating a more boxy look. The 1958 models saw a new grille and quad headlamps along with new circular gages.

Engines

- 223 cu in (3.7 L) Ford "Mileage Maker" I6 (1958–1960)
- 272 cu in (4.5 L) Ford Y-Block V8 (1957)
- 292 cu in (4.8 L) Ford Y-Block V8 (1958–1960)
- 302 cu in (4.9 L) Lincoln Y-block V8

== Fourth generation (1961–1966) ==
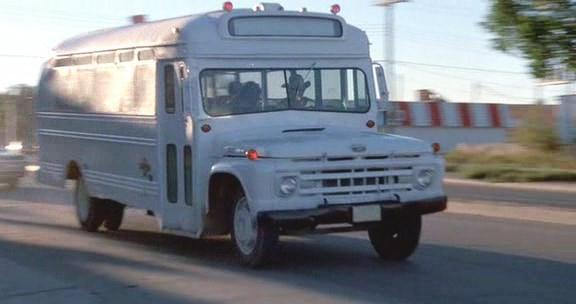
1961 Ford B Series with new designed front grill

The B series was redesigned for 1961 offering a new horizontal grille and fenders that were flared just above the front wheel to allow for larger wheels. The new chassis and front fascia made the truck look lower and wider than previous years. The quad head lamps were replaced with single lights integrated into the grille. The frame and suspension were also redesigned to be tougher than before. This generation of B series would be the last to utilize the same front fascia as light duty Ford trucks. Both the B series and medium duty F series were to gain their own look.

Engines

- 262 cu in (4.3 L) Ford I6 (1961–1964)
- 292 cu in (4.8 L) Ford Y-Block V8 (1961–1963)
- 330 cu in (5.4 L) Ford FT V8 (1964–1966)
- 361 cu in (5.9 L) Ford FT V8 (1964–1966)
- 391 cu in (6.4 L) Ford FT V8 (1964–1966)
- 240 cu in (3.9 L) Ford 240 I6 (1965–1966)
- 300 cu in (4.9 L) Ford 300 I6 (1965–1966)

== Fifth generation (1967–1979) ==
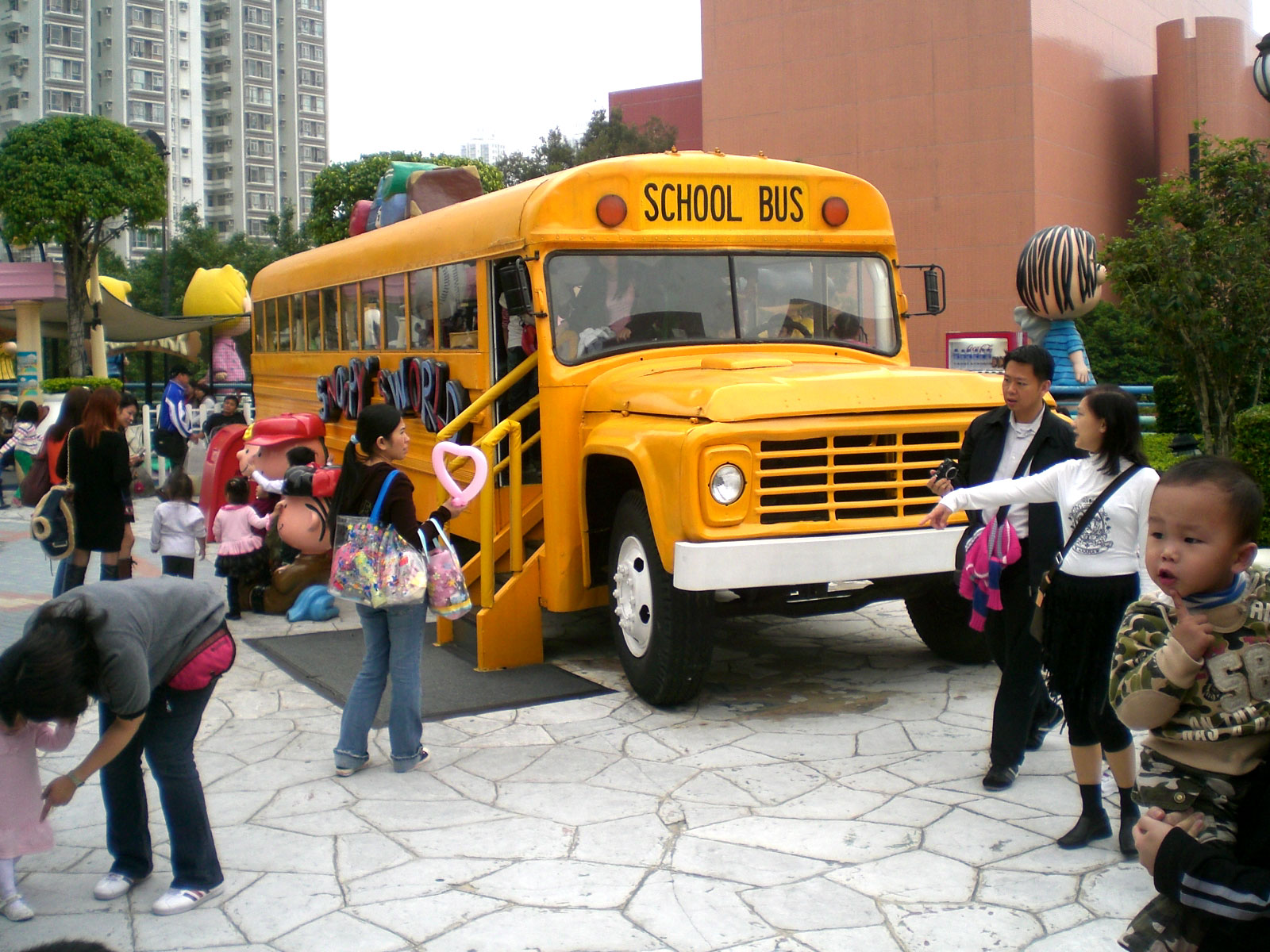
Early 1970s Ford B series located in Hong Kong

Ford completely redesigned both the B series and medium-duty F series and departed from using the same grilles as the lighter duty F-series trucks. The new buses were taller and wider with a large grille utilizing much of the space of the front fascia. The new grille was rectangular with the single headlights being placed very near the far ends of the grille. The fenders were even more flared than before to allow for a wider track and larger wheels and tires needed to make the necessary gain in GVW to remain competitive. This generation was also the first to receive the option of a diesel engine in place of the strictly gasoline lineup in the past. An extra "0" was added to the series notation on diesel models. After 1968, the Mercury-branded version of the B series was discontinued in the Canadian market. For 1973, the grille was updated with longer teardrops around the headlights and F O R D block lettering appeared on the front of the hood just above the grille.

Engines
Gasoline

- 330 cu in (5.4 L) Ford FT V8 (1967–1977)
- 361 cu in (5.9 L) Ford FT V8 (1967–1977)
- 391 cu in (6.4 L) Ford FT V8 (1967–1977)
- 370 cu in (6.1 L) Ford 385/Lima V8 (1978–1979)

Diesel

- Caterpillar 1140 V8 (1968–1974) B-6000 Only
- Caterpillar 1145 V8 (1968–1974) B-6000 and B-7000
- Caterpillar 3208 V8 (1975–1978) B-7000 Only

== Sixth generation (1980–1998) ==
For 1980, the B-Series was redesigned for the first time since 1967 production. Again sharing model commonality with the medium-duty F-Series, the model line saw significant external design changes; in place of the long-running full-width hood, Ford shifted to a narrower hoodline combined with separate fenders. In another change, the grille shifted its design influence from F-Series light trucks to the L-Series "Louisville" heavy trucks.

In production across 19 model years, this is the longest-produced version of the B-Series; for 1995, the model line received a redesign of the hood.

=== 1980–1994 ===
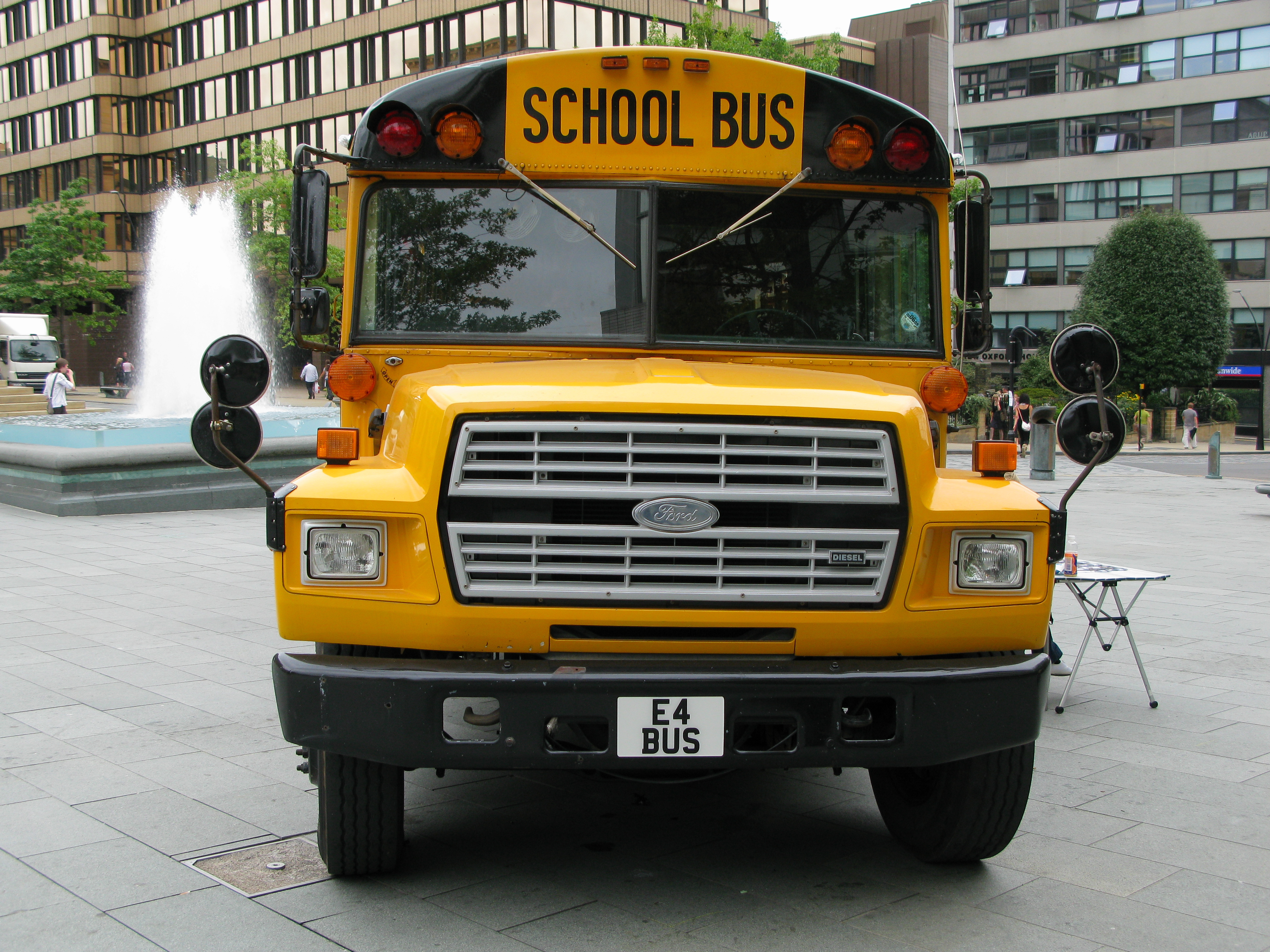
1980–1994 B-series Diesel located in the UK

For 1980, the sixth-generation B-Series was derived from the F-700, F-800, and F-8000 (diesel). As a cowled chassis (produced without a cab) with no interior, the B-Series was produced with a revised dashboard from the previous generation. For 1984, the medium-duty F-Series and B-Series adopted the Ford Blue Oval emblem, replacing the "FORD" lettering in the center of the grille; other revisions were made to cowl badging. As an option, a tilt-forward hood was introduced alongside the standard rear-hinged hood; on the B-series, the tilting hood would become standard by the end of the 1980s.

Engines

For its 1980 launch, the sixth-generation was offered with three engines. Alongside the 6.1L (370) gasoline V8 and the Caterpillar 3208 V8 diesel (Ford B-8000), a Detroit Diesel four-stroke 8.2L V8 was introduced as an option. For 1982, Ford introduced a 7.0L gasoline engine as an option.

During the 1980s and early 1990s, the engine offerings would undergo several revisions. For 1985, as part of a joint venture with New Holland, Ford introduced a 6.6L and 7.8L inline-6 diesel sourced from Brazil. For 1991, the Caterpillar 3208 and Detroit Diesel V8s were withdrawn (following the discontinuation of the latter); it would also serve as the final year for the 6.1L gasoline V8. For 1992, Ford introduced Cummins 6BT and C8.3 diesels; for 1993, they would replace the Ford-New Holland diesels entirely.

Gasoline

- 370 cu in (6.1 L) Ford 385/Lima V8 (1980–1991)
- 429 cu in (7.0 L) Ford 385/Lima V8 (1982–1994)

Diesel

- 8.2 L Detroit Diesel "Fuel Pincher" V8 (1980–1990)
- 6.6 L and 7.8 L Ford-New Holland I6 (1985–1992)
- 5.9 L Cummins 5.9 6BT I6 (1992–1998)
- 10.4 L Caterpillar "3208" V8 (1983–1990)
- 8.3 L Cummins "C8.3" I6 diesel (1992–1994)

=== 1995–1998 ===
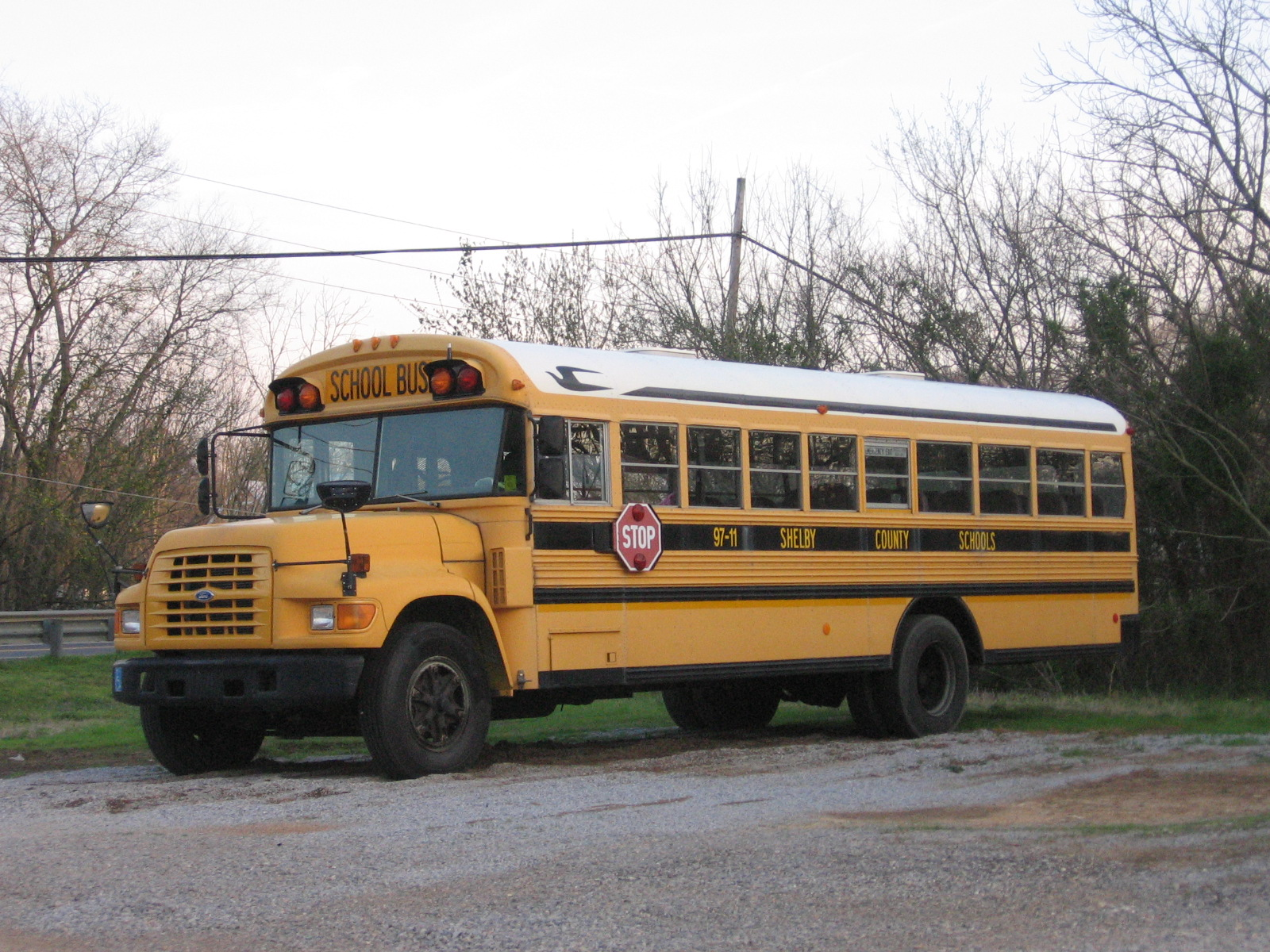
1997 Ford B series located in Alabama, USA.

For 1995, the medium-duty F-Series underwent a model revision, improving the aerodynamics of the hood design, with the B-series following suit. With few changes made to the chassis, the B-series retained the same steering column and instrument panel used since 1980. For the first time, a tilt-steering column was offered as an option (distinguished by Ford-badged steering wheels sourced from International).

The badging of the B-Series underwent a revision, ending the use of external B-700/B-800 designation; all cowl badges used "B-Series" badging.

After a 50-year production run, the final B-series cowled bus chassis was produced as the sixth-generation medium-duty Ford F-Series ended its model cycle after the 1998 model year.

Engines

While the 7.0L gasoline engine remained standard on the medium-duty F-Series, the 1995 B-series shifted entirely to diesel-fuel engines, using Cummins-sourced 5.9L and 8.3L inline-6 engines.

- 5.9 L Cummins 5.9 6BT I6 diesel (1992–1998)
- 8.3 L Cummins 8.3 I6 diesel (1994–1998)

== Discontinuation ==
While the medium-duty F-Series was redesigned for a seventh generation for the 1999 model year (topping the Super Duty line), the model line no longer included a B-Series cowled bus chassis. Several factors would contribute to the discontinuation of the model line, related both to Ford and to bus manufacturers.

From 1980 to 1998, the number of major school bus manufacturers using cowled bus chassis had been reduced from six to four (three, after 2001). In an effort to secure their future, body manufacturers began a series of business agreements with chassis suppliers (with some becoming subsidiaries of the latter). As the 1990s progressed, Ford was faced with the potential withdrawal of the B-series or entering into a supply agreement with a body manufacturer to guarantee a source of demand. Following the 10-year agreement between General Motors and Blue Bird Corporation to standardize its B7 chassis (making Ford an extra-cost option); a potential arrangement proved increasingly difficult as AmTran and Thomas Built Buses were purchased outright in 1995 and 1998 by truck manufacturers Navistar and Freightliner, respectively.

At the end of 1996, Ford sold the rights to its heavy-truck lines to Freightliner subsidiary of Daimler-Benz. Redesigned less than a year before, the Louisville/Aeromax heavy trucks were reintroduced as the Sterling brand of trucks. While the sale did not include the F-Series medium-duty trucks, a condition of the sale included a 10-year non-compete agreement, stipulating that the two companies would not introduce products in direct competition with one another. Introduced in 1997, the Freightliner FS-65 (developed from its medium-duty FL-Series before the sale) would inherit much of the cowled-chassis market share vacated by the B series. While Ford was able to continue the medium-duty F-Series (entering into the Blue Diamond joint venture with Navistar to produce the model line), the overlap that a bus chassis derived from it represented was a potential breakage of the non-compete agreement.

In response to the conclusion of the Blue Bird/GM agreement, in 2002, Ford sought its own supply agreement with the company. A few prototype vehicles were developed from F-650/F-750 Super Duty trucks (converted to cowled-chassis vehicles); the design did not lead to an agreement between the two companies. Elements of its design were developed further, becoming the Blue Bird Vision; in place of a commercially sourced chassis, the Vision uses a proprietary chassis.

As of current production, Ford no longer produces a cowled-chassis bus in North America. Shifting its production exclusively to cutaway vehicles, Ford produces vehicles derived from the Transit (350/350HD), E-Series (E-350/E-450), Super Duty (F-550), and medium-duty F-Series (F-650/F-750). The vehicles are produced for multiple applications; along with school buses, the chassis are also used for shuttle buses, paratransit, and multiple commercial uses.

== Body manufacturers ==
The B series was widely available and was used by many manufacturers throughout its production run.

Body Manufacturer	Model Name	Years Available	Notes
American Transportation Corporation	Volunteer (1992–1996); CS (1997–1998)	1992–1998	Ford was the only non-International chassis to be bodied by AmTran
Blue Bird Corporation	Blue Bird/Ford B-Series	to 1998	After 1998 the B-Series body was sold with a Blue Bird Body. Sold alongside Blue Bird Vision after 2003.
Carpenter Crown By Carpenter	Classic	to 1998	From 1996 to 1999, Carpenter used the Crown by Carpenter brand name on their buses.
Les Enterprises Michel Corbeil		1990–1998	Sold only in Canada.
Superior Coach Company	Pioneer	to 1982	
Perley A. Thomas Car Works Thomas Built Buses, Inc.	Saf-T-Liner Conventional	1972–1998	replaced by Freightliner-based buses (FS-65)
Ward Body Works	Master Deluxe; Volunteer	to 1992	
Wayne Corporation Wayne Wheeled Vehicles	Lifeguard	1973–1995	

== See also ==
- School bus
