= Blue Bird North Georgia =

School bus manufacturing plant in Georgia, United States

- Operated: 1984–2010
- Location: 1198 Shattuck Industrial Boulevard; LaFayette, Georgia, United States
- Industry: Automotive
- Products: school buses
- Employees: 350 (2010)
- Volume: 295,000 square feet (27,400 m^{2})
- Owner: Blue Bird Corporation

Blue Bird LaFayette plant, operating as Blue Bird North Georgia, was a school bus manufacturing plant in LaFayette, Georgia owned by Blue Bird Corporation.

== History ==
Industry Week named it one of the top 25 plants in North America in 2005 and 2006, and a top 10 plant in 2007.

On June 24, 2010, Blue Bird Corporation announced it will shut down its Blue Bird North Georgia manufacturing plant in LaFayette, Georgia, and will lay off 350 workers at the plant, consolidating all bus production to its company headquarters in Fort Valley. The plant closed on August 30, 2010.

== Products made ==
- Blue Bird Conventional (1984–2004)
- Blue Bird Vision (2003–2010)
- Blue Bird SBCV (2004–2007)
