= Wayne Lifeguard =

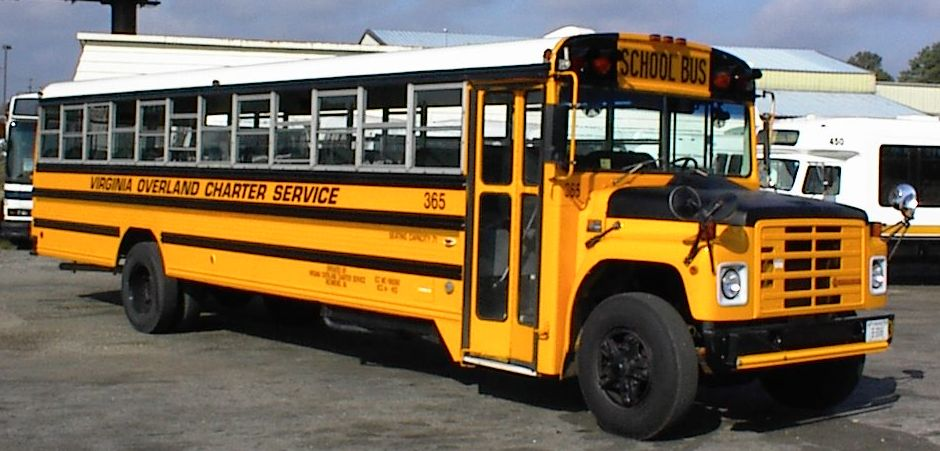

Overview
- Manufacturer: Wayne Corporation; Wayne Wheeled Vehicles
- Also called: Welles Lifeguard (Canadian market)
- Production: 1973–1995
- Assembly: Richmond, Indiana; Marysville, Ohio
- Designer: Wayne Corporation

Body and chassis
- Class: Type C (Conventional)
- Body style: School bus Commercial bus
- Layout: 4x2
- Platform: see below
- Related: Wayne Lifestar

Powertrain
- Engine: Gasoline; Diesel

The Wayne Lifeguard is a type C school bus built by Wayne Corporation, introduced in 1973. Produced until Wayne Corporation declared bankruptcy and was liquidated in late 1992, the Lifeguard was also produced by successor Wayne Wheeled Vehicles until their closure in 1995. The Lifeguard introduced new methods of design and construction for school buses to improve their collision.

== Overview ==
=== Structural Integrity Issues in School Buses ===
In the late 1960s, a weak point and location of structural failure in catastrophic school bus crashes was considered to be body joints, the points where panels and pieces were fastened together. Longitudinal steel guard rails had been in use since the 1930s to protect the sides of buses, but behind them on the sides and on the roofs, manufacturers used many individual panels to construct a bus body.

Around 1967, safety engineers at Ward Body Works of Conway, Arkansas subjected one of their school bus bodies to a multiple roll test, and noted the separation at the joints. Ward engineers noted that many of their competitors were using far fewer rivets. This resulted in new attention by all body manufacturers to the number and quality of fasteners. To Wayne engineers, simply increasing the number of fasteners (rivets, screws, and huckbolts) was not satisfactory. In their own tests, the joints were always the weak point under high stress loads regardless of the number of fasteners. They also noted how the continuous guard rails used on the sides tended to spread the stress away from the point of impact, allowing it to be shared and dissipated at portions of the body structure further away. Instead of trying to figure out how to make the fasteners do a better job, the engineers stood back and wondered how the design features of the guard rails could be expanded. The result was a revolutionary new design in school bus construction: continuous longitudinal interior and exterior panels for the sides and roofs.

=== Lifeguard: A Paradigm Shift ===
Branded the Lifeguard, Wayne's new conventional-style school bus design used the company's roll-forming presses to make single steel stampings that extended the entire length of the bus body. The concept was that by reducing the number of joints, the number of places where the body could be anticipated to separate in a catastrophic impact was reduced in a like amount. The "Lifeguard" design reduced overall body weight, the number of fasteners used, and man-hours required for assembly. However, the roll-form presses were very large, requiring special equipment to handle the finished panels. A more practical problem was the panels had to be cut to exact length for each bus body order, which varied with seating capacities and from state-to-state specifications. This created a marketing disadvantage as the Wayne factory required greater manufacturing lead time than in the past whereas the previous technology allowed for more interchangeability and customization in orders.

Shortly after the Lifeguard was introduced, Wayne held a nationwide contest soliciting ideas to improve school bus safety, with a new Lifeguard school bus as the grand prize. The winning entry was submitted by a school bus driver in Goochland County, Virginia, whose district received the new school bus. Her idea was to incorporate sound baffles in the ceiling of school bus bodies to help reduce driver distraction. Compact forms of such equipment were later developed used by Wayne and other school bus manufacturers when diesel engines (and their greater noise) became more widely available in conventional-style school buses (like the Lifeguard) in the 1980s.

==== Real-world Crash Testing ====
The benefits of the Lifeguard design were proved in several potentially catastrophic collisions. For example, in 1982, at Petersburg, Virginia, a 1973 Wayne Lifeguard school bus transporting 41 elementary school children was struck broad-side at an intersection by a fire truck that had gone through a red traffic signal without stopping while responding to an alarm.

The school bus was rocked violently, but after the fire truck literally bounced off of it (rather than penetrating the body); the bus driver was able to regain control and stop safely. The fire truck was spun 180° and its front was demolished; all 3 firefighters were hospitalized. The bus driver and all children were transported to the hospital as well. One child on the bus suffered a broken arm; the rest were mostly scared but uninjured.

Further investigation of the collision revealed that the impact of the fire truck had failed to overcome the strength of the longitudinal panels and the guard rails. Investigators discovered that despite a bulge of several inches on the longitudinal interior panel, there had been no all-the way through penetration of the passenger compartment whatsoever, no joint separation, and no sharp edges created. Instead, they found the substantial impact stress had been shared over a widespread area along the entire structure of the passenger compartment "box", protecting the occupants as intended by the design.

== Influence of Lifeguard design ==
In the years following the Lifeguard's introduction, competing body manufacturers began using fewer, larger body panels to reduce body joints. However, none had become as progressive as Wayne's use of the full-length panels when the focus on structural integrity resulted in the upgraded requirements of the U.S. Federal Motor Vehicle Safety Standards for school buses (#220 and #221), which became applicable on April 1, 1977. After that date, most manufacturers (including Wayne) added special structural adhesives to other fasteners at body joints

== Chassis Suppliers ==
Wayne Lifeguard Chassis Suppliers
Manufacturer	Chrysler Corporation	Ford Motor Company	General Motors	International Harvester Navistar International
Model Name	Dodge S-Series	Ford B600/B700/B800	Chevrolet/GMC B-series	Loadstar; S-Series "Schoolmaster"; 3800
Years Available	1973–1977	1973–1995	1973–1992	1973–1978 (Loadstar); 1979–1989 (S-Series); 1989–1995 (3800)
Notes	Dodge ended production of school bus chassis after 1977		After 1992, GM B-Series supplied only to Blue Bird	

== Manufacturing ==
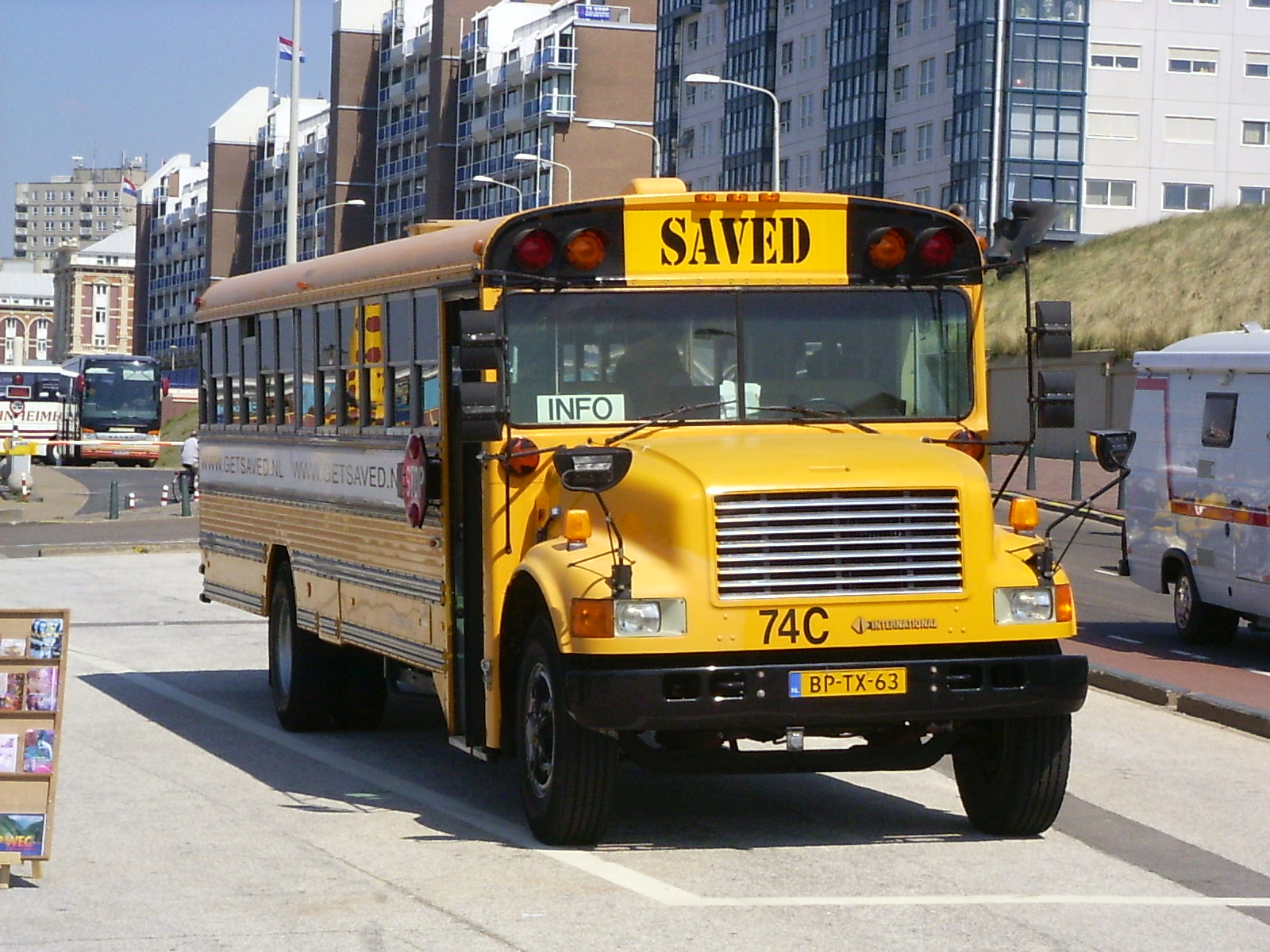
Retired 1990s Lifeguard in use in the Netherlands

The Lifeguard was produced in Wayne's Richmond, Indiana production facility. Canadian subsidiary Welles produced the Lifeguard in Windsor, Ontario until its closure in 1990. After the closure of Wayne Corporation in 1992, production was shifted to Marysville, Ohio after the rights to Wayne product lines were acquired. Lifeguard production continued until 1995 with the closure of Wayne Wheeled Vehicles by its parent company.
