= Ford F-Series (ninth generation) =

Ninth generation of the Ford F-Series trucks

Ninth generation
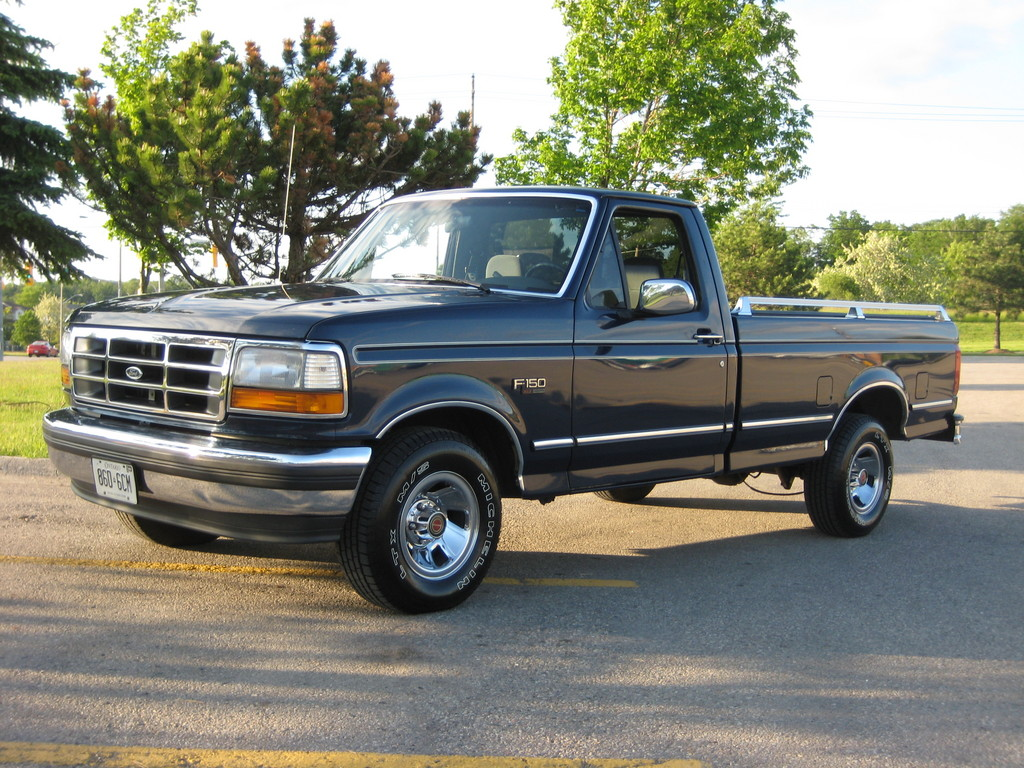
- 1993 F-150 XLT

Overview
- Manufacturer: Ford
- Also called: Ford Lobo (Mexico); Ford F-1000 (Brazil)
- Production: August 1991 – December 1997
- Model years: 1992–1997; 1996–1998 (Brazil)
- Assembly: Cuautitlán, Mexico; Kansas City, Missouri; Norfolk, Virginia; General Pacheco, Argentina (Ford Argentina); São Bernardo do Campo, Brazil (Ford Brazil); Louisville, Kentucky; Wayne, Michigan; Oakville, Ontario (Ontario Truck Plant); Valencia, Venezuela (Valencia Assembly); St. Paul, Minnesota (Twin Cities Assembly Plant)
- Designer: Jack Telnack (1989)

Body and chassis
- Body style: 2-door pickup truck 2-door chassis cab extended cab 4-door chassis cab 2-door chassis cab Medium-duty truck Bus chassis (B-Series)
- Related: Ford Bronco; Ford B-Series

Powertrain
- Engine: Gasoline; 3.8 L (232 cu in) Essex V6 (Ford F-150, Mexico); 4.9 L Truck Six I6; 5.0 L Windsor V8; 5.8 L Windsor V8; 7.5 L 385-series V8; Diesel; 7.3 L IDI diesel V8 (1992–1994); 7.3 L IDI Turbo diesel V8 (1993–1994); 7.3 L Power Stroke turbodiesel V8 (1994.5–1997)
- Transmission: Automatic; 3-speed Ford C6; 4-speed Ford 4R70W/AOD-E; 4-speed Ford E4OD; Manual; 4-speed NP435 (1992); 5-speed Mazda M5OD; 5-speed ZF S5-42; 5-speed ZF S5-47

Dimensions
- Wheelbase: Regular cab 8' box: 133 in (3,378 mm); Regular cab 6.75' box/Flareside: 116.8 in (2,967 mm); SuperCab 8' box: 155 in (3,937 mm); SuperCab 6.75' box/Flareside: 138.8 in (3,526 mm); Crew cab 8' box: 168.4 in (4,277 mm); Crew cab 6.75' box: 152.2 in (3,866 mm)
- Length: Regular cab 8' box: 213.3 in (5,418 mm); Regular cab 6.75' box: 197.1 in (5,006 mm); SuperCab 8' box: 235.3 in (5,977 mm); SuperCab 6.75' box: 219.1 in (5,565 mm); Crew cab 8' box: 248.9 in (6,322 mm); Crew cab 6.75' box: 232.7 in (5,911 mm)
- Width: 79 in (2,007 mm)

Chronology
- Predecessor: Ford F-Series eighth generation (1987–1991)
- Successor: Ford F-Series (tenth generation) (1997–2003); Ford Super Duty (F-250 and above)

The ninth generation of the Ford F-Series is a lineup of trucks that were produced by Ford from the 1992 to 1998 model years. The final generation of the F-Series to include a complete range of trucks from a half-ton F-150 pickup truck to a medium-duty F-800 commercial truck, this is the third generation of the F-Series body and chassis introduced for 1980.

To improve the aerodynamics of the exterior, the front fascia underwent a substantial revision to its design. The Flareside bed design made its return, following a substantial change in its design.

In 1996, the tenth-generation F-Series was released (including the F-150) for the 1997 model year. The ninth-generation F-250 and F-350 remained in production through the 1997 and 1998 model years, respectively. For 1999, the heavier-duty model lines were replaced by Ford Super Duty trucks, a brand also adopted for Ford medium-duty trucks.

== Design history ==
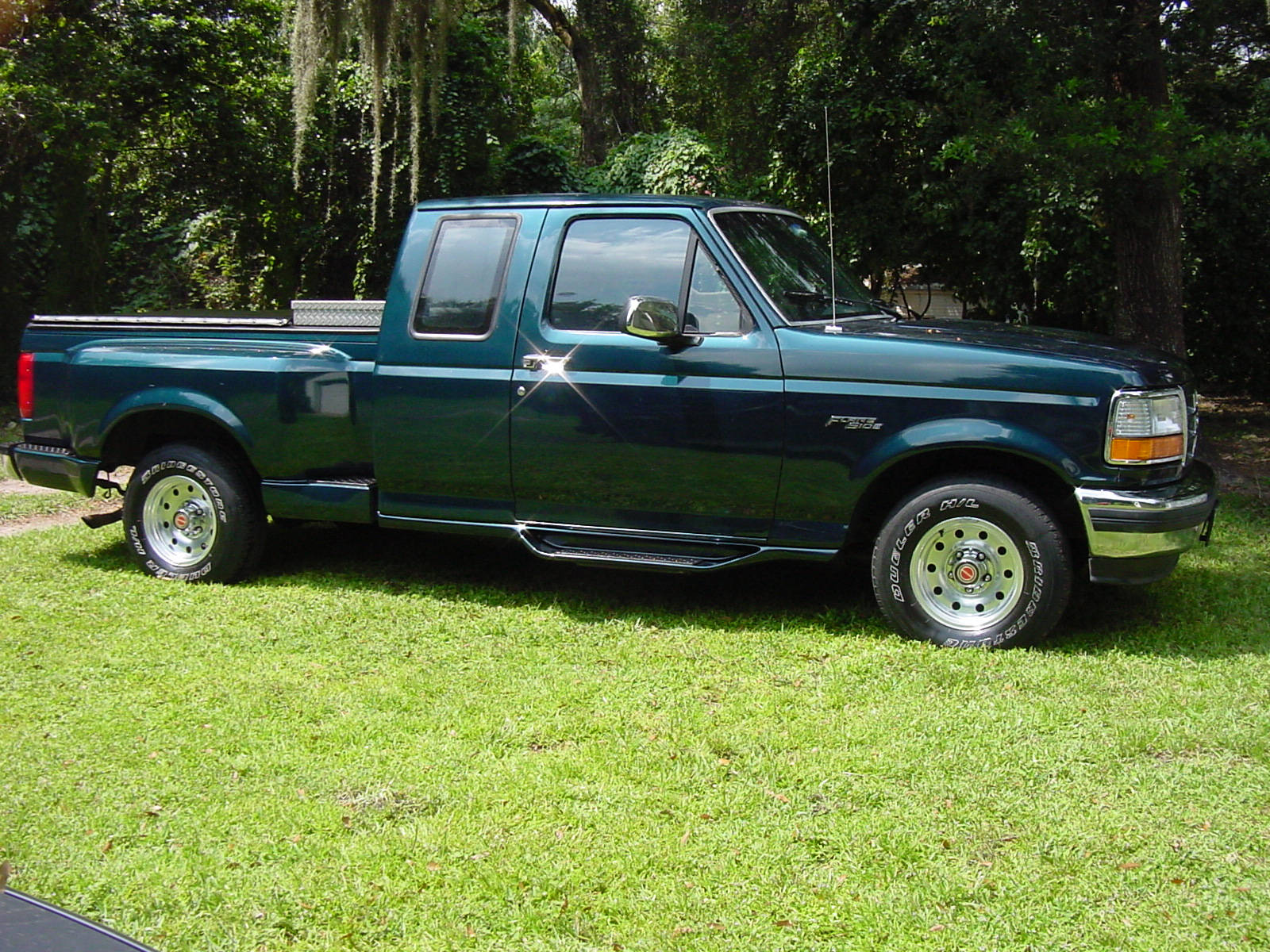
1994 F-150 Flareside SuperCab

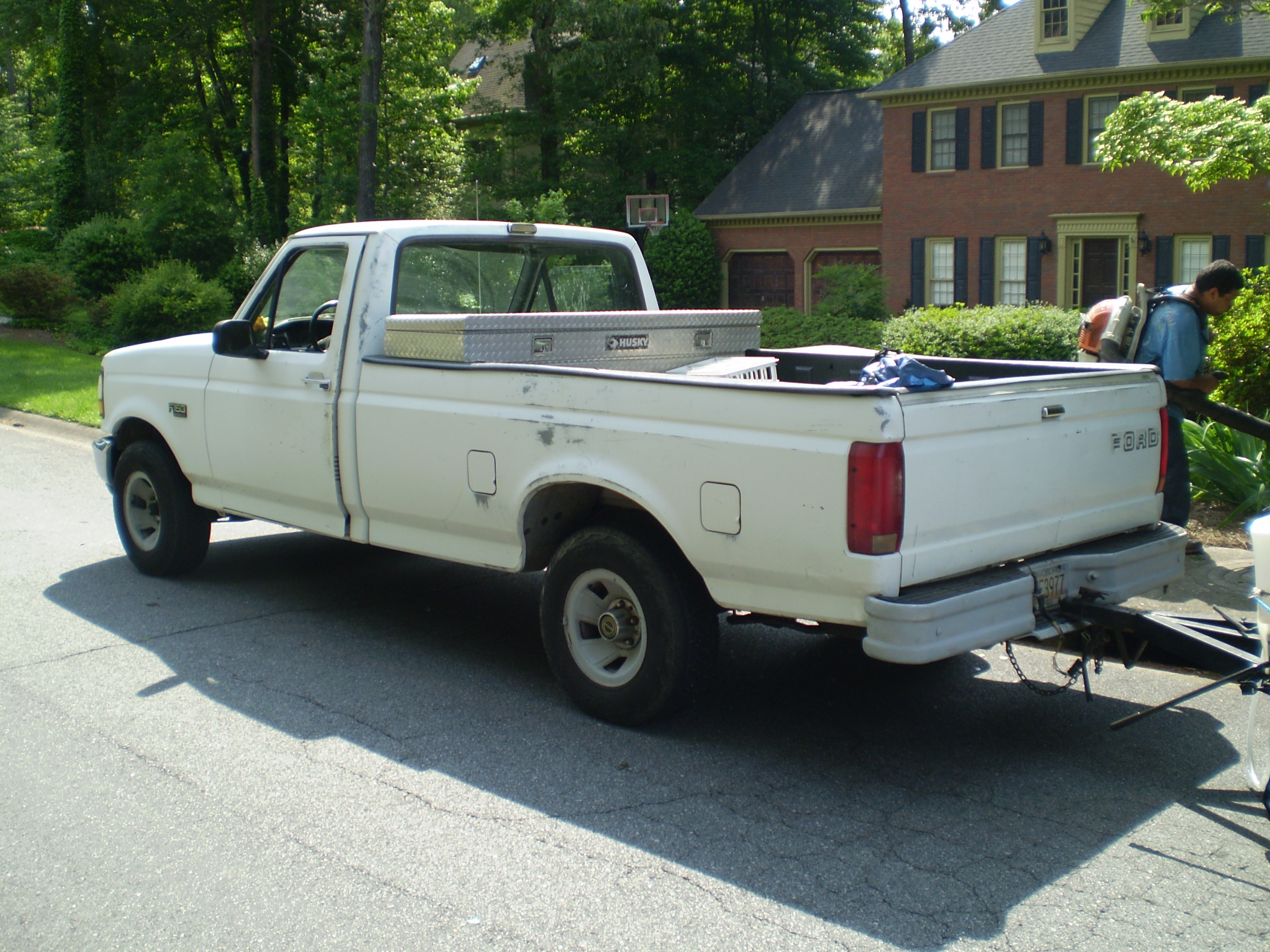
1992 F-150 Custom

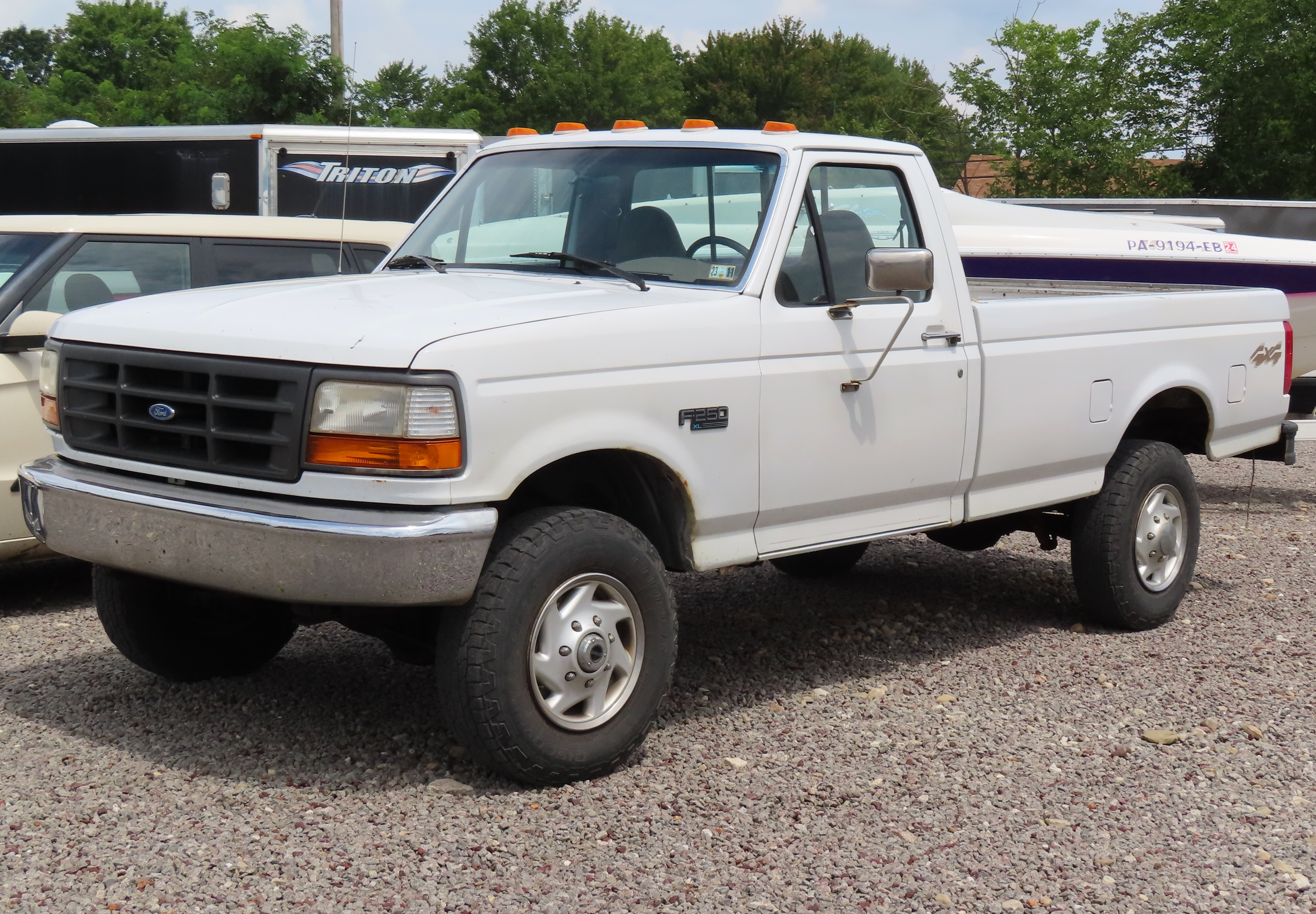
1996 F-250 XL 4×4

In the interest of aerodynamics, the lines of the hood, front fenders, and grille were rounded off for 1992. Along with the larger grille, the headlights were enlarged (with the turn signals again moving below). Inside, the interior was updated with a redesigned dashboard along with new seats. Extended-cab (SuperCab) models received larger rear side windows. A notable change included the reintroduction of the Flareside bed that returned for production since 1987. Instead of the previous classic-style bed, the Flareside bed was now a narrow-body version of the dual rear-wheel bed; the rear fenders were repositioned to fit the width of the cab. Also, unlike with the classic Flareside bed, dual gas tanks were available with it, but only for 2-wheel-drive models. There are also F-150 badges being replaced by special Flareside badging as seen on the front fenders.

The 1994 models brought a slightly updated dashboard and the addition of a standard driver's-side airbag on F-150s and light-duty F-250s only, center high mount stop lamp (CHMSL), brake-shift interlock, and CFC-free air conditioning. New options for 1994 included remote keyless entry with alarm, a compact disc player fitted into the regular stereo system, and a power driver's seat; an electrochromic inside rear view mirror was also offered for 1994 and 1995 as part of a luxury light package.

Ford trailed its rival General Motors in combined truck sales for much of the ninth generation, though sales steadily rose each year. About 500,000 F-Series trucks were sold in 1992, but this rose to nearly 800,000 by 1996, allowing Ford to overtake combined sales of Chevrolet and GMC trucks for the first time in a decade.

== Trims ==
- Custom (1992 only) – Included: Cargo box light, tinted glass, argent grille, steel wheels with hubcaps, color-keyed floormats, an AM radio with digital clock and two speakers (which may be deleted for credit), vinyl bench seat, and voltmeter, oil pressure, and temperature gauges.
- Special (1995–1996; F-150 only) – same as Custom.
- XL (1992–1997) – Added: argent steel wheels, air conditioning, a cloth bench seat, and a rear bench on the SuperCab only.
- XLT (1992–1997) – Added: Black rub strip, chrome grille, deep-dish aluminum wheels, carpeted map pockets, an AM/FM stereo with digital clock and two speakers, and a cloth and vinyl bench seat.
- Nite (1992) – Included: All blacked-out exterior trim, either a pink or blue/purple stripe, and a "Nite" decal on the sides of the cargo box. Was only available in raven black and on F-150 models equipped with a V8 engine.
- SVT Lightning (1993–1995) – Added (from XLT trim): 5-spoke aluminum rims, an AM/FM stereo with cassette player, digital clock and four speakers, power windows and locks, and air conditioning.
- Eddie Bauer (1995–1996, F-150 only) – Added (from XLT trim): slotted front bumper, Eddie Bauer floor mats, rear privacy glass (SuperCab models), convertible console seat, power mirrors, two-tone exterior paint, and forged aluminum deep-dish wheels.

The monochromatic "Nite" package introduced in 1990 continued but was dropped at the end of the 1992 model year. As before, it featured an all-black exterior with either a pink or blue/purple stripe and "Nite" decal on the sides of the cargo box.

For 1993, the Custom model was dropped, as the XL became the new base model. Following the lead of the Aerostar, Bronco, and Explorer, the Eddie Bauer trim line—featuring plusher trim and increased standard features—was introduced for 1995. Also in 1993, the SVT Lightning was introduced, slotting itself in between the Chevrolet 454SS and GMC Syclone. Ford Special Vehicles Team upgraded the Lightning from the regular F-Series with heavier-duty components, including a beefier frame, suspension, and brakes; a 240 hp version of the 5.8L V8; and the E4OD overdrive transmission normally paired with the 7.3L diesel and 460 7.5L V8 options.

The F-150 4×4 continued the use of the Dana 44 Twin-Traction Beam axle from the 1980–1991 trucks, and the Ford 8.8" rear straight axle. The 4×4 F-250 carried the Dana 50 Twin Traction Beam axle, the Sterling 10.25 from the previous generation for the rear; full-float on the F-250 HD and the 4×4 F-350 used the Dana 60 front straight axle, and the Sterling 10.25" rear straight axle.

== Models ==
The ninth-generation Ford F-Series lineup consisted of the following:

- F-150: 1/2 ton (6,250 lb GVWR max)
- F-250 (light-duty): 1992–1996 3/4 ton (6,600 lb GVWR max) (2WD Regular Cab only)
- F-250 HD: 1992–1997 3/4 ton (8,800 lb GVWR max)
- F-350: 1 ton (9,200 lb GVWR max on SRW pickups; 10,000 lb GVWR max on DRW pickups; 11,000 lb GVWR max on chassis cab models)
- F-Super Duty (chassis cab model only): 1 1/2 ton and greater (15,000 lb GVWR max)

The F-150, F-250, F-250 HD, F-350, and F-Super Duty were available in many different configurations from chassis cab base models, up to XLT trimmed models with their chrome and plush seating. The trucks came with a variety of gasoline and diesel engines. The F-150 and light-duty F-250 could be had with one of three gas engines: the 4.9L I6, the 5.0L V8, and the 5.8L V8. The F-250 HD and F-350 could be had with the 4.9L I6 (certain 2WD models only), 5.8L V8, 7.5L V8, or 7.3L V8 diesel. The F-Super Duty was only available with a 7.5L V8 or 7.3L V8 diesel.

The first version was the 7.3L IDI (Indirect Injected) V8 (1992–1993.5), which was produced by International Harvester. From 1993.5–1994.5, a turbocharged 7.3L IDI V8 with stronger internals was offered as emissions, power, and torque demands were increasing. In the second half of 1994, the new direct-injected 7.3L Power Stroke V8 (T444E) turbo-diesel from Navistar replaced the 7.3L IDI V8.

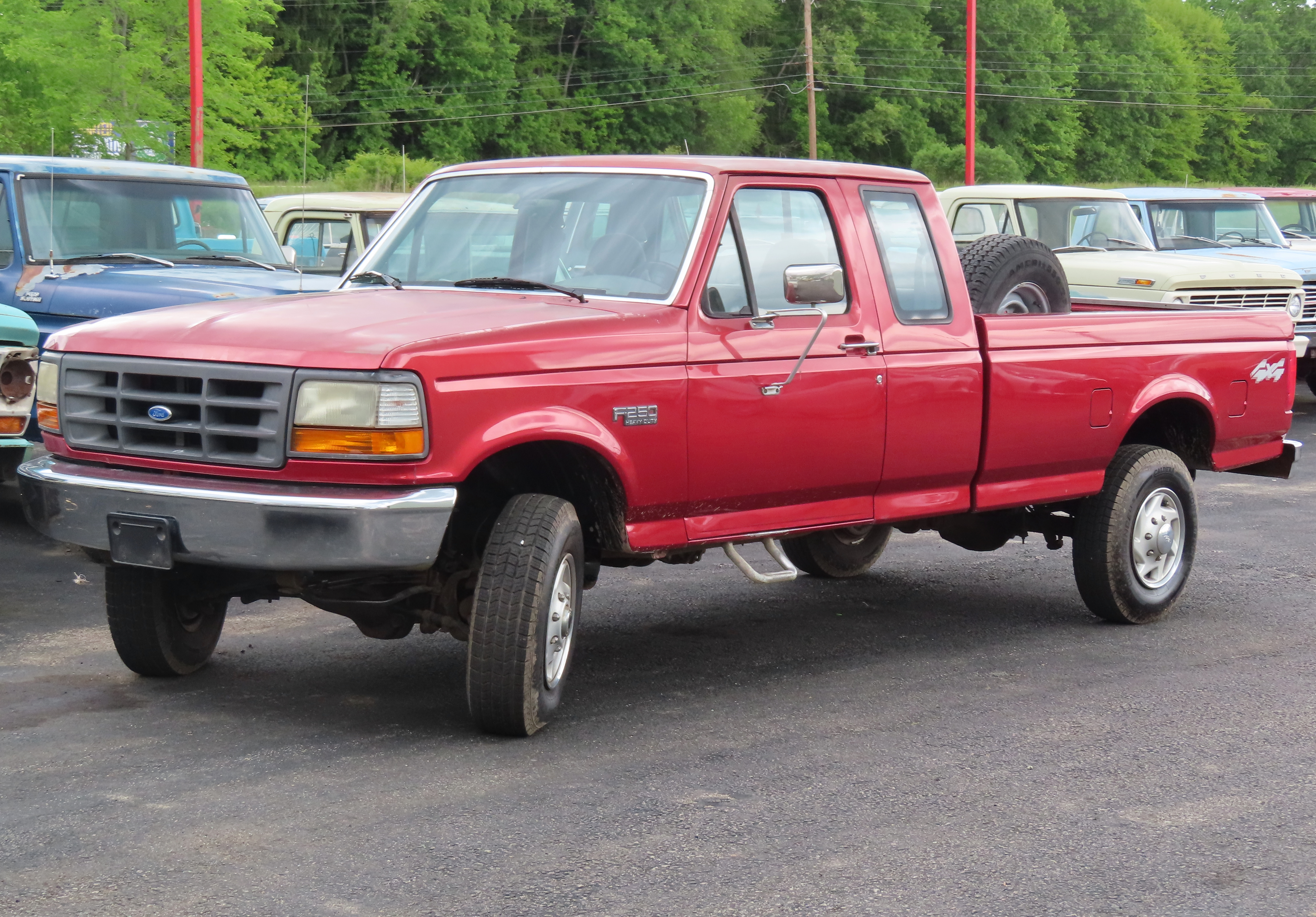
1997 F-250 "Heavy Duty"

The F-250 wore "Heavy Duty" badging for 1997 and differed from the earlier F-250 only slightly. It had “Heavy Duty” printed on the F-250 badges, had slightly different moldings, used the F-350 4407 transfer case, and was available in different cab/bed configurations from earlier F-250 trucks. The term “Heavy Duty” was not in fact to do with an upgrade in the truck's abilities but was to differentiate it from the F-250 light-duty truck, which was simply a tenth generation F-150 with seven-lug wheels. The tenth-generation light-duty F-250 was not related to the 1997 F-250 HD or the newer 1999 F-250 Super Duty.

As part of the 4×4 off-road package, they were available with several skid plates underneath. After 1997, the heavier-duty models were split from the Ford F-150. These lines of trucks were called the 1999 Ford Super Duty. Because of these design changes, service technicians started to refer to the first Power Strokes as an OBS or Old Body Style to avoid confusion from the similar Super Duty 7.3L Power Stroke parts. The F-150 could be had with either short (6.5') or long (8') beds with either regular or extended cab (SuperCab). The F-250 and F-350 trucks were only available with long beds (8 ft.) except in 1996 and 1997, when the short bed was available with the F-250 HD SuperCab or Crew Cab. The short-bed F-250 HDs were only available with the 7.3L Power Stroke or 7.5L V8 engines, and were only produced for a little over a year. The OBS (ninth generation) officially ended production in December 1997.

Some regular cab F-250 models have a Dana 44 Twin-Traction Beam found on the F-150 and Bronco instead of the heavier Dana 50 Twin-Traction Beam. These trucks are distinguished by their significantly smaller locking hubs.

== Variants ==
=== Medium-duty F-Series ===
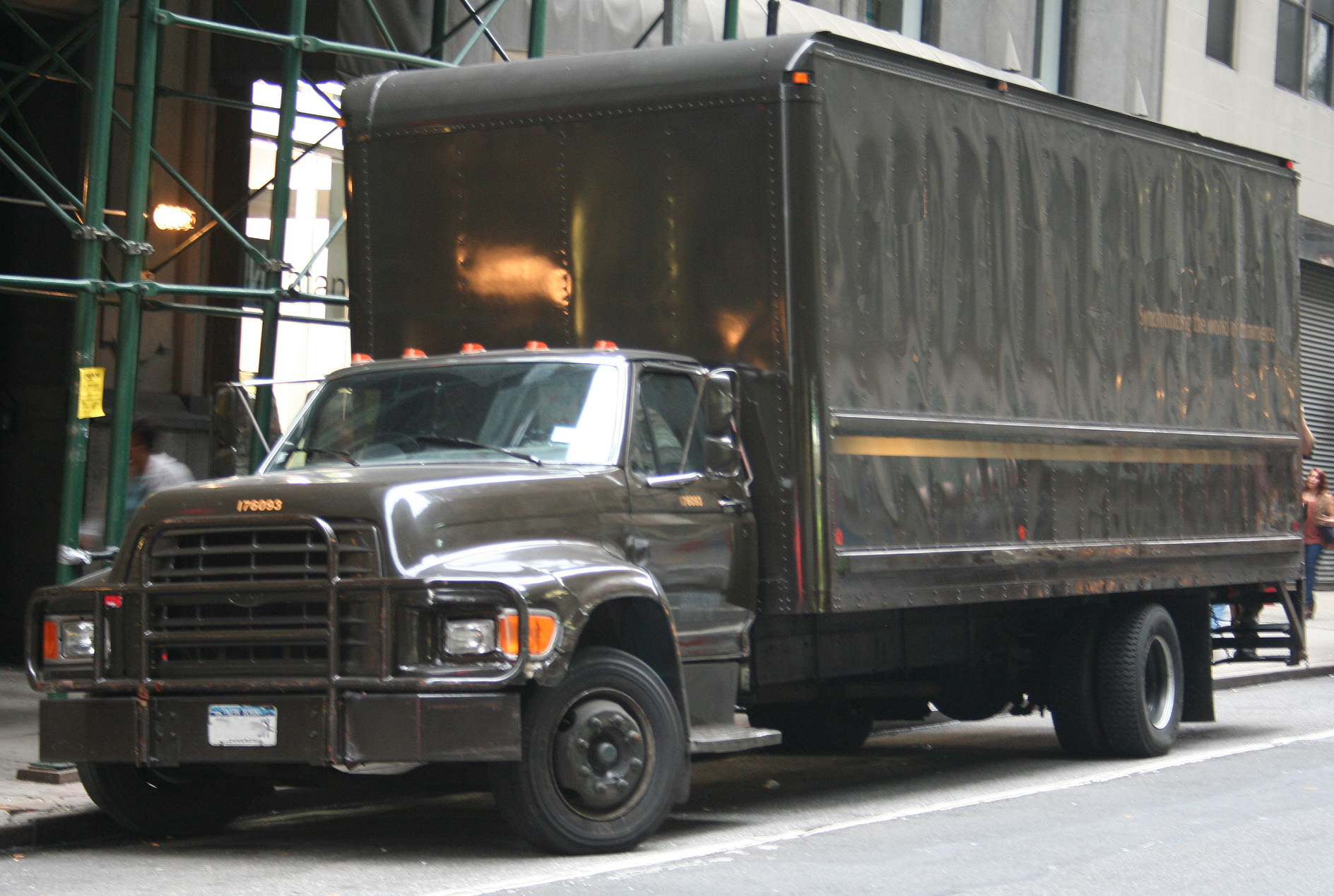
1994–1998 F-700 cargo truck

As a running change during the 1994 model year, Ford revised the exterior of its medium-duty trucks for the first time since their 1980 redesign, beginning with the F-800. A tilting-cowl hood was made standard with a redesigned hood and grille; turn signals were relocated besides the headlamps. The cowl badging was revised, with a singular "F-Series" badge replacing the previous specific model designation. For 1995, the F-600 was discontinued while the F-700's exterior was refreshed. The F-700 was discontinued for 1999.

In contrast to F-Series pickup trucks, medium-duty trucks saw few changes to the interior; the dashboard controls and steering column were essentially the same as those from 1980.

While medium-duty trucks were still offered with a 7.0L gasoline V8 (the 6.1L V8 was discontinued after 1991), the model line was primarily powered by diesel-fueled engines. Instead of the Navistar T444E V8 engine used by the F-250/F-350, the medium-duty trucks used inline-6 diesels (the Caterpillar 3126 and the Cummins 6BT/ISB).

For 2000, the F-800 was discontinued alongside the derivative B-Series bus chassis. While the latter has not been replaced, Ford re-entered the medium-duty truck segment for 2000 with the Ford F-650/F-750 Super Duty, developed as part of a joint venture with Navistar.

=== SVT Lightning ===
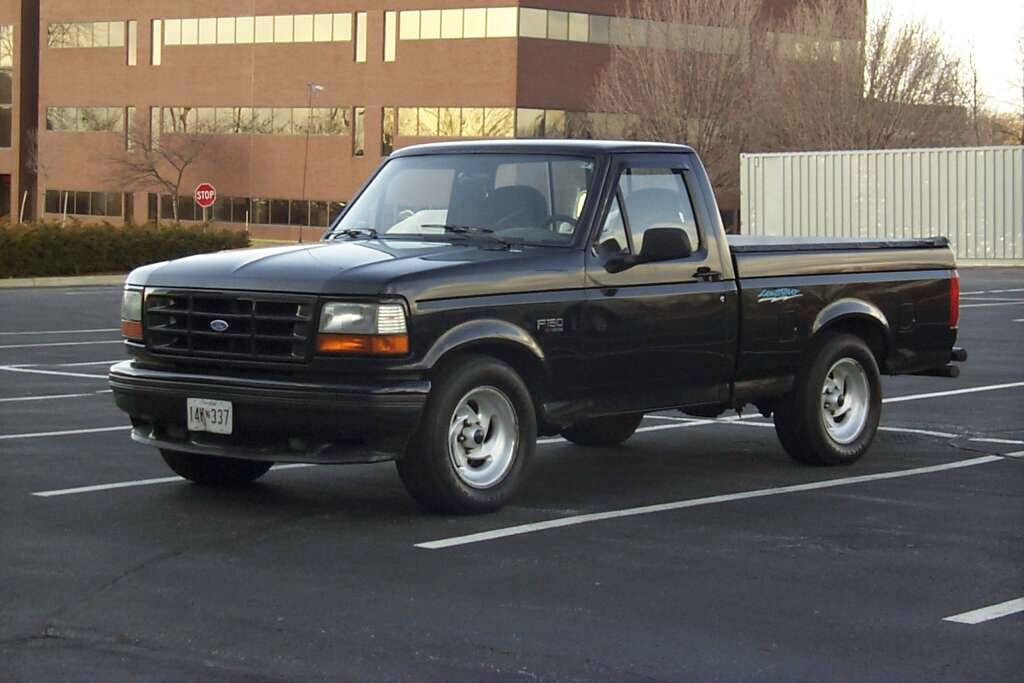
1993 Ford SVT Lightning

The SVT Lightning is a sports/performance version of the F-150, designed by Ford's Truck Division and released by Ford's SVT (Special Vehicle Team) division.

Ford introduced the Lightning in 1992 to compete with primarily the Chevrolet 454SS, in an effort to enhance the sporty, personal-use image of the Ford F-Series pickup. This initial Lightning featured performance handling developed by world-champion driver Jackie Stewart. The Lightning was powered by a special 240 hp (179 kW) version of the 351 in^{3} (5.8 L) V8 engine. The Lightning shared its basic platform structure with the regular F-150, but modifications were made to many vehicle systems. A 351 in^{3} (5.8 L) Windsor V8 producing 240 hp (179 kW) and 340 ft⋅lbf (461 N⋅m) of torque replaced the standard F-150 engine. The engine was based on an existing block, but Ford engineers fitted it with high flow rate "GT40" intake and heads. Like all factory 351s, the Lightning's engine was equipped with hypereutectic pistons to increase response, output and durability. The engine was also fitted with stainless steel "shorty" headers.

The Ford E4OD automatic transmission was the only available transmission. An aluminum driveshaft connected the transmission to 4.10:1 gear in the limited-slip differential. The suspension had custom-calibrated shocks, front and rear anti-roll bars, and a special leaf in the rear, tipped with a rubber snubber, that acted as a traction bar and controlled rear wheel hop during hard acceleration. To enhance the Lightning chassis, the thicker frame rails from the 4WD F-250 were used to increase rigidity. Additional gusseting was added to the frame at high-stress locations, such as immediately behind the front suspension and over the rear axle. Stock, the Lightning was capable of achieving 0.88 g lateral acceleration, while it retained almost all of the hauling and trailer-towing capabilities of the normal short-wheelbase F-150. Special 17" aluminum wheels with Firestone Firehawk tires, unique Lightning badging, a front air dam with fog lamps and color-matched bumpers from the Bronco, a 120-mph gauge, and blacked-out trim all differentiated the Lightning from normal F-150s. Bucket seats with electrically adjustable side bolsters and lumbar supports were part of the package. Suspension modifications provided a 1 in front and 2.5 in rear drop in ride height.

The 1993 Lightning, launched by Ford President Ed Hagenlocker on December 15, 1992, received more than 150 favorable articles in America's newspapers, magazines, and television outlets, and helped Ford retain leadership in the personal-use truck market. Three-time World Champion driver Jackie Stewart was highly involved in fine-tuning of the Lightning's handling.

Model Year	Engine	Power	Torque	Black	Red	White	Total Production
1993	5.8 L Windsor FI V8	240 hp (179 kW)	340 ft·lbf (461 N·m)	2,691	2,585	N/A	5,276
1994	5.8 L Windsor FI V8	240 hp (179 kW)	340 ft·lbf (461 N·m)	1,382	1,165	1,460	4,007
1995	5.8 L Windsor FI V8	240 hp (179 kW)	340 ft·lbf (461 N·m)	824	695	761	2,280
Total							11,563

== Powertrain ==
The 1992 redesign retained the powertrain lineup from the previous generation; the lineup of the 4.9 L inline-6, 5.0 L and 5.8 L Windsor V8s, the 7.5 L big-block V8, and the 7.3 L International IDI diesel V8 were all carried over. The diesel gained a turbocharger in mid-1993. The 1994 model year engine lineup was re-tuned to increase output. Later that year, the IDI diesel V8 was replaced by the T444E V8. Dubbed the Power Stroke by Ford, the new diesel was again supplied by Navistar International. Despite sharing identical displacement with its IDI predecessor, the turbocharged Power Stroke/T444E was an all-new design with direct fuel injection. This was the second diesel engine with electronic fuel injection to be put into a light-duty truck. (The GM 6.5 L Turbo Diesel with the Stanadyne DS-4 injection pump was the first, in 1992, and the Dodge Ram did not offer EFI in its diesel engines until 1998.)

As before, the 5.0 L V8 was not offered in trucks over 8,500 lbs GVWR, and the F-Super Duty was available with the 7.5 L and diesel only. Below 8,500 lbs GVWR, the 7.5 L and diesel were not available. The 4.9 L was available in certain models of the 2WD F-250 HD and chassis-cab F-350s through 1996. The ninth generation was the last F-Series to offer the venerable pushrod 5.0 L V8 engine.

Engine	Model Years	Power	Torque	Notes
4.9 L I6	1992–93	145 hp (108 kW)	265 lb⋅ft (359 N⋅m)	
4.9 L I6	1994–96	150 hp (112 kW)	260 lb⋅ft (353 N⋅m)	
5.0 L V8	1992–93	185 hp (138 kW)	270 lb⋅ft (366 N⋅m)	
5.0 L V8	1994–97	205 hp (153 kW)	275 lb⋅ft (373 N⋅m)	195 hp (145 kW) for automatic
5.8 L V8	1992	210 hp (157 kW)	315 lb⋅ft (427 N⋅m)	
5.8 L V8	1993	200 hp (149 kW)	310 lb⋅ft (420 N⋅m)	
5.8 L V8	1993–95	240 hp (179 kW)	340 lb⋅ft (461 N⋅m)	Lightning only
5.8 L V8	1994–97	210 hp (157 kW)	325 lb⋅ft (441 N⋅m)	Roller lifters introduced for 1994
7.5 L V8	1992–93	230 hp (172 kW)	390 lb⋅ft (529 N⋅m)	
7.5 L V8	1994–97	245 hp (183 kW)	410 lb⋅ft (556 N⋅m)	
7.3 L IDI V8 diesel	1992–94	185 hp (138 kW)	360 lb⋅ft (488 N⋅m)	IDI
7.3 L IDI V8 diesel	1993.5–94	190 hp (142 kW)	390 lb⋅ft (529 N⋅m)	IDI Turbo
7.3 L Power Stroke V8 turbo-diesel	1994.5–95	210 hp (157 kW)	425 lb⋅ft (576 N⋅m)	Direct injection Turbo, Power Stroke, International T444E
7.3 L Power Stroke V8 turbo-diesel	1996–97	215 hp (160 kW)	425 lb⋅ft (576 N⋅m)	Direct injection Turbo, Power Stroke, International T444E
