= Blue Bird Fort Valley plant =

Bus manufacturing plant in Fort Valley, Georgia

Blue Bird Body Company
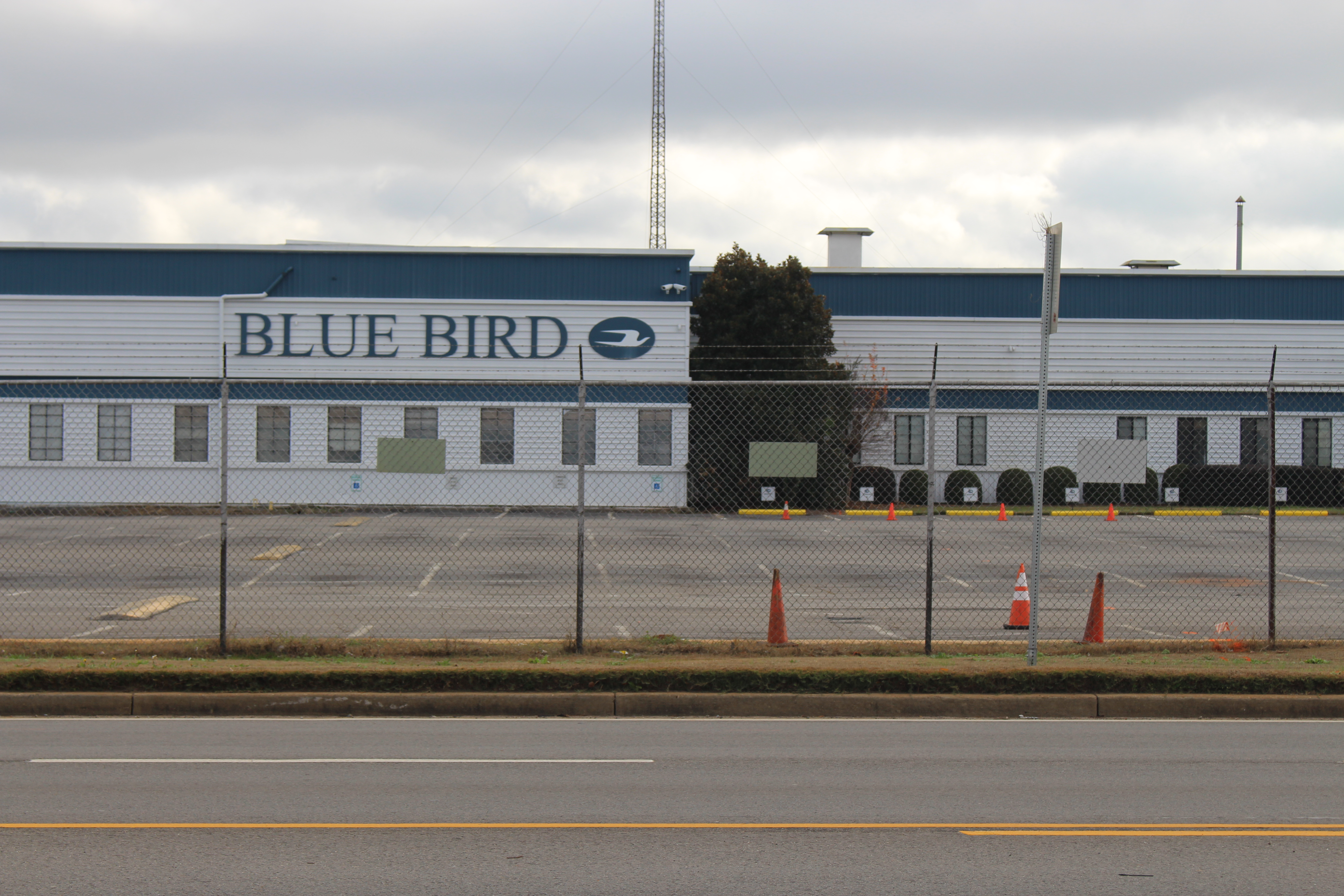
- Built: 1946
- Operated: 1946–present
- Location: 402 Bluebird Boulevard; Fort Valley, Georgia, United States
- Industry: Automotive
- Products: school buses
- Employees: 1,500
- Owner: Blue Bird Corporation

Blue Bird Fort Valley plant, operating as Blue Bird Body Company, is a school bus manufacturing plant in Fort Valley, Georgia owned by Blue Bird Corporation.

== History ==
The first Fort Valley facility was opened in 1935; It was destroyed by fire in 1945. The present-day Fort Valley facility was opened in 1946.

In 2008, the Blue Bird Corporation (formerly the Blue Bird Body Company) established a second plant in Fort Valley, Georgia, known as Blue Bird South, to expand its in-house component fabrication capabilities such as seat frames, metal panels, steps, and bumpers.

In 2023, Blue Bird opened a dedicated 40,000-square-foot Electric Vehicle Build-up Center on its main Fort Valley grounds to scale production from 4 up to 20 zero-emission vehicles per day.

== Products made ==
- Blue Bird All American (1948–present)
- Blue Bird Vision (2003–present)
- Blue Bird Micro Bird (1975–2010)
- Blue Bird Conventional
- Blue Bird TC/2000 (1987–2003)
