= Blue Bird Vision =

School bus made by Blue Bird

- 2026 Blue Bird Vision from Texas

Overview
- Manufacturer: Blue Bird Corporation
- Production: 2003-present
- Assembly: United States: Fort Valley, Georgia (Blue Bird Body Company; 2003–present); LaFayette, Georgia (Blue Bird North Georgia; 2003–2010)

Body and chassis
- Class: Type C (conventional)
- Body styles: Cowled-chassis bus: School bus; Commercial bus
- Platform: Blue Bird proprietary chassis

Powertrain
- Engines: Diesel; Propane (LPG); Compressed Natural Gas (CNG); Gasoline; Electric
- Transmissions: 5-speed automatic; 6-speed automatic

Dimensions
- Wheelbase: 169–280 in (4.3–7.1 m)
- Length: 309–499 in (7.8–12.7 m)
- Width: 96 in (2.4 m)
- Height: 122–128 in (3.1–3.3 m)
- Curb weight: up to 33,000 lb (14,969 kg) GVWR

Chronology
- Predecessor: Blue Bird Conventional (International); Blue Bird CV200 (General Motors)

The Blue Bird Vision is a bus that has been manufactured by Blue Bird Corporation since 2003. The first cowled-chassis bus assembled without the use of a second-party chassis supplier, the Vision takes its name from the improved visibility stemming from its steeply sloped hood. While sold primarily as a yellow school bus, the Blue Bird Vision is also offered with various commercial and specialty seating and design configurations.

The successor of the long-running Blue Bird Conventional (including the GM-based CV200 and the International-based SBCV), the Vision is similar to the All American and TC/2000 in its use of a proprietary chassis designed by Blue Bird. The Vision is the first cowled-chassis vehicle built this way, ending dependency on a manufacturer of medium-duty trucks for its chassis supply. The Vision was introduced the same year as the International 3300 and Freightliner S2 chassis, collectively marking a major improvement in forward visibility surrounding the front of the vehicle.

Since 2003, Blue Bird has assembled the Vision alongside the Blue Bird All American at its Blue Bird Body Company facility (Fort Valley, Georgia). Prior to its 2010 closure, the Blue Bird North Georgia (LaFayette, Georgia) facility also served as a source of production.

== Background ==
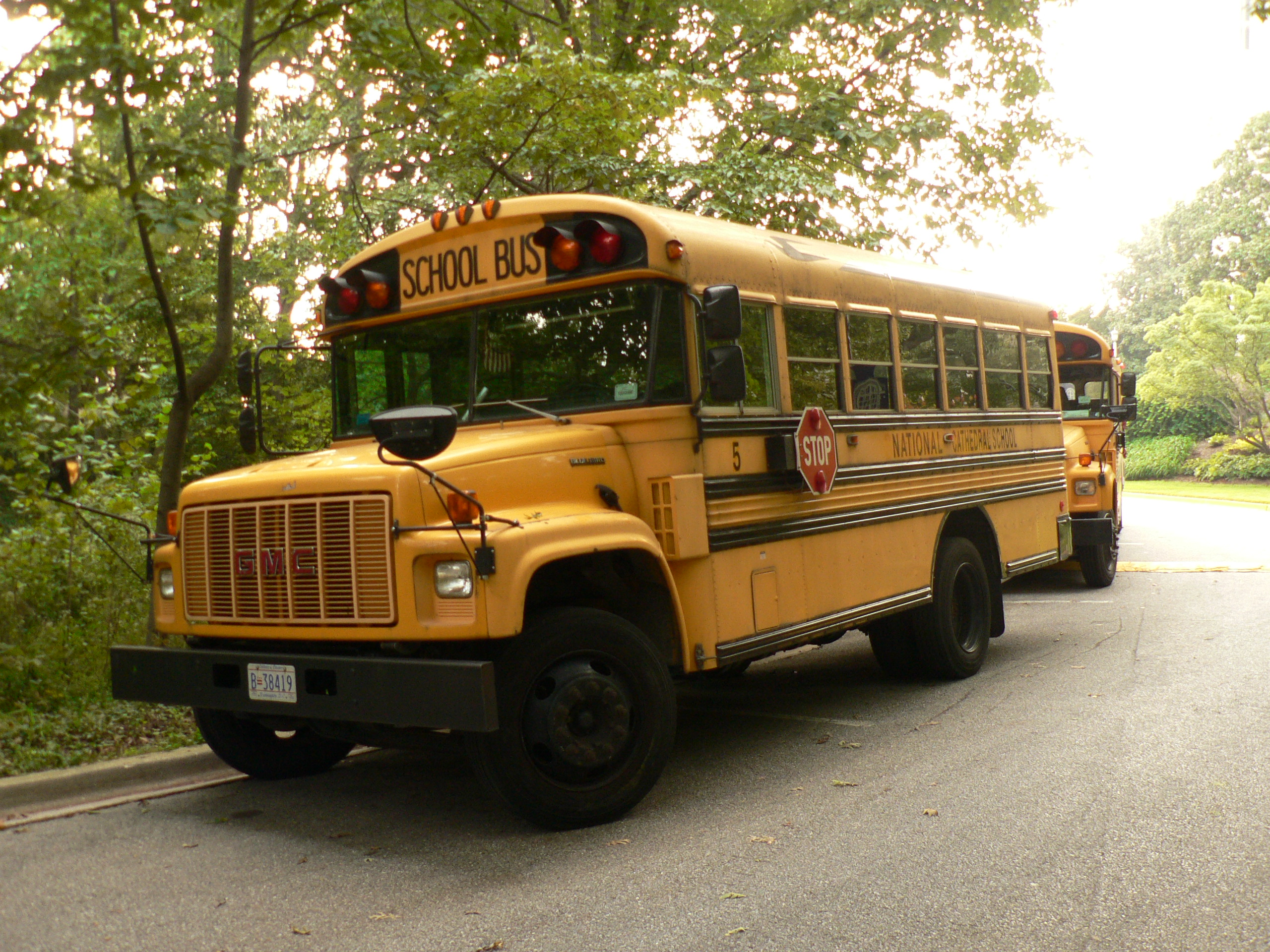
1990s Blue Bird/GMC CV200, a predecessor of the Vision

In the early 2000s, Blue Bird Corporation was in a need to find a reliable source of chassis supplier for its Blue Bird Conventional Type C buses. At the time, a 1991 supply agreement with General Motors was set to expire at the end of 2003 with little signs of renewal. At the time, GM was ending production of its GMT530-generation medium-duty trucks and its successor GMT560 platform was deemed unsuitable for full-size bus use; subsequently, GM concentrated the entirety of its bus production on cutaway van chassis.

After 2000, Freightliner (the parent company of Thomas Built Buses) ended chassis supply of the Freightliner FS-65 to all competitors.

Although many company customers specified the Blue Bird Conventional with the International 3800 chassis, its production was ending in 2004. In addition, Navistar had become the parent company of Blue Bird competitor AmTran (renamed IC Corporation in 2001). Ultimately, Blue Bird became the sole body manufacturer outside of IC to secure a supply of the replacement International 3300.

Following the 2001 closure of Carpenter, the end of its agreement with GM left Blue Bird as the sole bus body manufacturer not aligned with a medium-duty truck manufacturer.

=== Blue Bird/Ford (2002) ===
To address the potential loss of a chassis supplier for the Blue Bird Conventional, the company began development of an all-new vehicle in collaboration with Ford Motor Company. Using a Ford F-650/750 Super Duty medium-duty truck chassis (introduced in 2000), Blue Bird intended to make Ford as its standard chassis supplier. The medium-duty truck line was not included in the 1997 sale of the Ford commercial truck lines to Freightliner, but Ford had not produced a cowled bus chassis since 1998 (largely as the company transitioned to the Super Duty generation).

In 2001, a prototype on an F-650 chassis (wearing the Blue Bird Conventional name) was shown at an industry trade show to a positive reception. At the same time, several prototypes were assembled using both F-650 and F-750 chassis. In contrast to the 1980-1998 B-series design, the new vehicle was fitted with a sloped hood and shared both its steering column and instrument cluster directly from the commercial vehicle. The Blue Bird-patented Safety View™ Vision Panel was a glass panel ahead of the entry door, improving driver sightlines in the loading-zone area. Though smaller than the glass panel on van-based school buses, the new panel utilized a wide-angle Fresnel lens.

By the end of 2002, the collaboration between Blue Bird and Ford ended without agreement on a production design. No official reason marked the end of development, though several accounts cite the company's replacement of the Ford Blue Oval emblem on the grille with its own design was done without permission from Ford. As of current production, the 2001-2002 F-750 prototypes are the final Ford cowled-chassis buses ever built.

Following the end of its collaboration with Ford, Blue Bird continued to develop the design. In place of the Ford chassis, the company moved away from a medium-duty chassis supplier to develop its own chassis for the vehicle. Though Blue Bird had produced its own stripped chassis for the All American, TC/2000, TC/1000, Wanderlodge, and Q-Bus product lines, a cowled chassis assembled by a body manufacturer was an industry first. Named the Blue Bird Vision, the new vehicle put the Safety View™ Vision Panel in production and was designed with the sharpest-angle hood slope ever before used on a school bus.

As of current production, the Blue Bird Vision is in its fourth generation, introduced in 2022. Though built on a proprietary chassis designed by the company, the Vision has derived its basic body structure from the Blue Bird Conventional that it replaced. First introduced in 1957, the same body structure has been used by the Blue Bird Mini Bird, the Blue Bird TC/1000 and TC/2000, and the Blue Bird All American. The Blue Bird is currently offered in three distinct versions: the standard Vision Diesel, along with the Vision Gasoline and Vision Electric (battery-electric vehicle).

== First generation (2003–2007) ==
Blue Bird Vision (first generation)
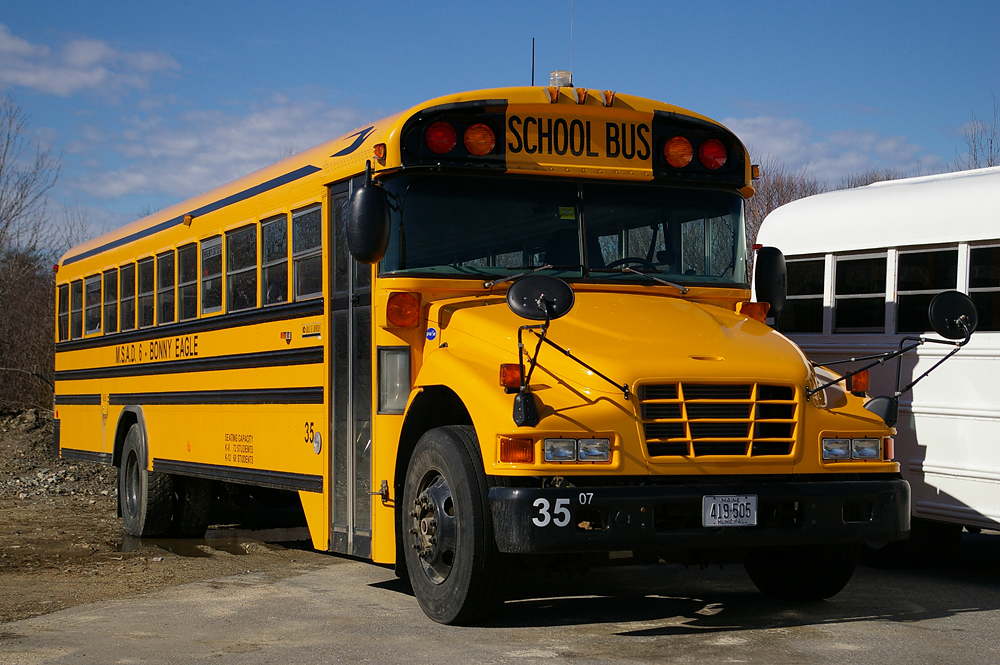
- 2007 Blue Bird Vision from Maine

Overview
- Production: 2003–2007
- Model years: 2004–2007

Body and chassis
- Platform: Blue Bird proprietary chassis
- Chassis: Cowled chassis
- Related: Blue Bird EC-72

Powertrain
- Engine: Caterpillar C7 7.2 L (441 cu in) I6 turbodiesel
- Transmission: Allison 5-speed automatic

Dimensions
- Wheelbase: 189–273 in (4.8–6.9 m)
- Length: 289–471 in (7.3–12.0 m)
- Width: 96 in (2.4 m) (overall); 91 in (2.3 m) (interior)
- Height: 120–124 in (3.0–3.1 m) (overall); 74 in (1.9 m) (interior-standard); 77 in (2.0 m) (interior-high roof)

Blue Bird Vision emblem (2003)

2006 Vision from Florida

In 2003, the Vision made its debut for 2004 production, replacing the CV200 Conventional. The previous Conventional was sold alongside it, offered only with International chassis (for 2005, the 3800 chassis was replaced by the 3300, becoming the Blue Bird SBCV). Like the Blue Bird All American transit-style bus, the Vision was produced with a Blue Bird-sourced chassis with the company becoming the first manufacturer to develop a cowled chassis.

As it would serve no other purpose beyond bus use, Blue Bird optimized the exterior of the Vision to maximize forward visibility; the hood was sharply angled from the base of the windshield, as were the front fenders. The 2003 Vision featured a 50° wheel cut for improved maneuverability over previous Type C buses. To make up for the loss of Ford-sourced components, the steering column was sourced from the TC/2000 and All American (with a reconfigured instrument panel).

The Blue Bird "Handy Bus" option package specified wheelchair lifts and flat-floor interiors. The Vision was available in standard (72") or high (77") headroom.

From 2003 to 2009, the Vision came with the Caterpillar C7 engine as standard equipment, and in 2008, the Cummins ISB6.7 became an option.

=== Blue Bird EC-72 (2007) ===
As Blue Bird unveiled the Vision in November 2006, the company also previewed a prototype Type C bus using the same chassis. The Blue Bird EC-72 was designed as a school bus with a lower production cost than the Vision, primarily through the simplification of its overall design and lack of customization. 28 prototypes were produced, but the EC-72 has yet to enter full-scale production.

== Second generation (2008–2014) ==
Blue Bird Vision (second generation)
- 2009 Blue Bird Vision Handy Bus from Alabama

Overview
- Production: 2007–2013
- Model years: 2008–2014

Body and chassis
- Platform: Blue Bird proprietary chassis
- Chassis: Cowled chassis

Powertrain
- Engine: Caterpillar C7 7.2 L (441 cu in) I6 turbodiesel (2008-2010); Cummins ISB6.7 6.7 L (409 cu in) I6 turbodiesel (2008-2014); General Motors L18 8.1 L (496 cu in) V8 LPG/propane (2009-2010); Ford Triton 6.8 L (413 cu in) V10 LPG/propane (2011-2014); TM4 SUMO electric motor (2019-2021)
- Transmission: Allison 5-speed automatic Ford 6R140 6-speed automatic (with Ford V10 LPG)

Dimensions
- Wheelbase: 189–273 in (4.8–6.9 m)
- Length: 289–471 in (7.3–12.0 m) (2008-2010); 309–499 in (7.8–12.7 m) (2011-2014)
- Width: 96 in (2.4 m) (overall); 91 in (2.3 m) (interior)
- Height: 120–124 in (3.0–3.1 m) (overall); 74 in (1.9 m) (interior-standard); 77 in (2.0 m) (interior-high roof)
- Curb weight: 15,100–18,400 lb (6,849.2–8,346.1 kg)

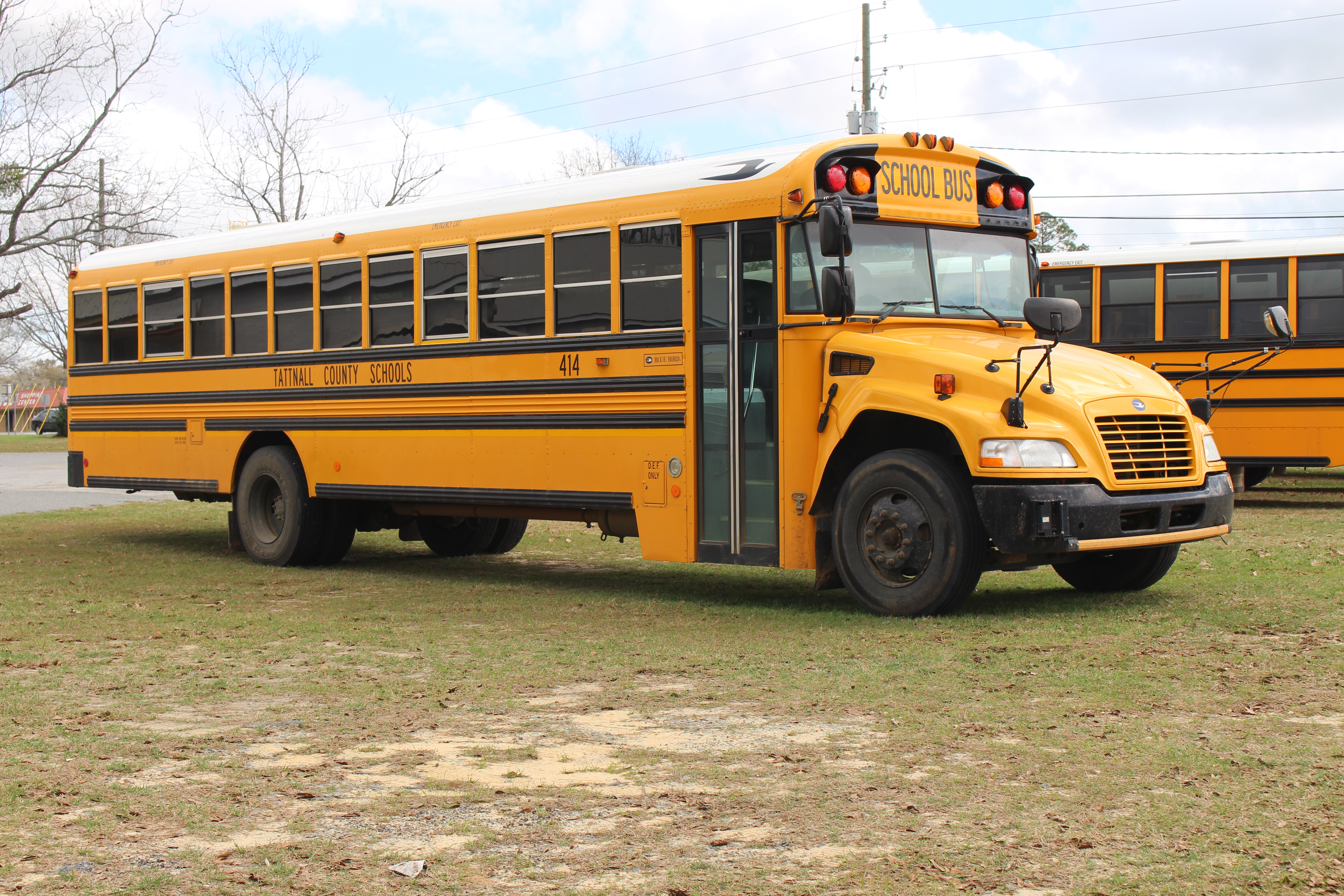
Second-generation Vision from Georgia. This unit has a yellow-painted grille.

For the 2008 model year, Blue Bird made a number of updates to the Vision. While the bus body itself remained unchanged, the hood design saw an extensive redesign. To increase space and improve engine cooling required for lower-emissions engines, the sharply angled hood was replaced by a more aerodynamic design that offered a larger grille. The hood design also moved the Blue Bird emblem from the back of the hood sides directly onto the grille. Several changes to the Vision would reflect the connection of Blue Bird to Volvo in the early 2000s; rather than sourcing parts from the All American, the 2008 Vision would source a number of parts from Volvo trucks (headlights, steering column, and instrument cluster). Along with the traditional manual and air-powered service doors, an electric-powered service door became an option.

In 2009, the Vision became the first factory-produced school bus equipped with a propane-fueled powertrain. In place of the diesel engine, the propane-fueled version used a GM 8.1L Vortec V8 engine with a propane system developed by CleanFuel USA. Previous school buses fueled by propane were aftermarket conversions (typically of the Chevrolet/GMC B series bus chassis). As Caterpillar ended on-road engine production, the C7 diesel was discontinued at the end of the model year.

=== 2011 update ===
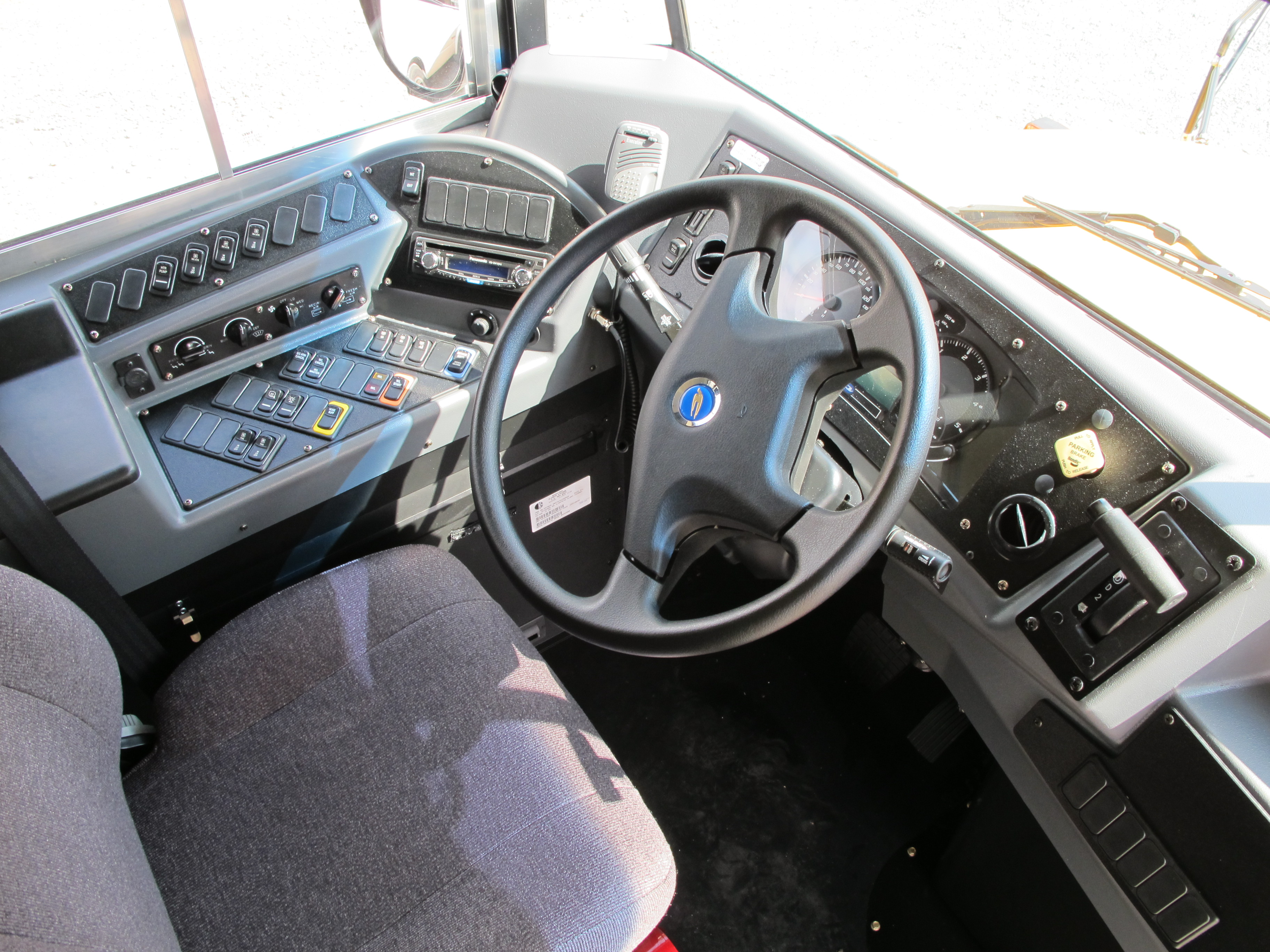
Driver's compartment of 2011 Blue Bird Vision

For 2011, Blue Bird made several detail changes to the Vision. On the outside, the exterior design of the rub rails was changed slightly. To increase parts commonality with the All American, the Vision was given the instrument cluster and steering column introduced with the newly redesigned All American D3. The propane-fuel Vision saw major changes related to its powertrain. Following the discontinuation of the GM 8.1L V8 in 2010, Blue Bird began a partnership with both Ford Motor Company and ROUSH CleanTech. The end result of the partnership was the propane Vision equipped with a 362 hp Ford 6.8L V10 and Ford 6-speed automatic transmission.

In 2013, a detail change saw the deletion of the namesake Safety View™ Vision Panel forward of the entry door.

== Third generation (2015–2021) ==
Blue Bird Vision (third generation)
- Blue Bird Vision Gasoline from New York State

Overview
- Production: 2013-2021
- Model years: 2015-2021

Body and chassis
- Platform: Blue Bird proprietary chassis
- Chassis: Cowled chassis

Powertrain
- Engine: Cummins ISB6.7 6.7 L (409 cu in) I6 turbodiesel (2015-2018); Cummins B6.7 6.7 L (409 cu in) I6 turbodiesel (2018-2021); Cummins ISV5.0 5.0 L (305 cu in) V8 turbodiesel (2016-2019); Ford Triton 6.8 L (413 cu in) V10 LPG/propane (2011-2014); Ford Triton 6.8 L (413 cu in) V10 CNG (2016-2021); Ford Triton 6.8 L (413 cu in) V10 gasoline (2016-2021)
- Electric motor: 315 hp (234.9 kW) TM4 SUMO (2019-2021)
- Transmission: Allison 5-speed automatic (Cummins engines); Ford 6R140 6-speed automatic (Ford V10); Eaton Procision 7-speed dual-clutch manual (optional 2017-2019, Cummins B6.7)
- Hybrid drivetrain: Cummins 7000 1-speed direct drive (Electric)
- Battery: 155 kWh Li-ion
- Electric range: 120 mi (193.1 km)

Dimensions
- Wheelbase: 189–273 in (4.8–6.9 m)
- Length: 289–471 in (7.3–12.0 m) (2008-2010); 309–499 in (7.8–12.7 m) (2011-2014)
- Width: 96 in (2.4 m) (overall); 91 in (2.3 m) (interior)
- Height: 120–124 in (3.0–3.1 m) (overall); 74 in (1.9 m) (interior-standard); 77 in (2.0 m) (interior-high roof)
- Curb weight: 15,100–18,400 lb (6,849.2–8,346.1 kg)

Third-generation Vision Diesel from Texas; this unit uses the traditional style of warning light hoods.

In July 2013, Blue Bird unveiled a number of changes to the Vision conventional at the School Transportation News Expo trade show. Designated as a 2015 model, the updated Vision entered production in October 2013. Distinguished by a redesigned grille with a larger Blue Bird emblem, a number of changes were made to the exterior lighting. Another distinguishing exterior feature was the roof stripe. In a change made to all Blue Birds, the full-length roof stripe was replaced by a shortened design of a single length. The Volvo-sourced headlamp clusters were replaced with single-piece clear-lens units; the change was intended to simplify beam adjustment. To lower the risk of burned-out lights, all clearance lights on the Vision were changed to LED bulbs (a change also made to the All American). 77 inches became the sole option for roof height as well. For the interior, the drivers compartment saw fewer substantial revisions, with the drivers' seat receiving a height-adjustable seatbelt; another option included a rear-view backup camera.

To further increase the appeal of the propane-fueled Vision, for 2015 production, Blue Bird introduced an optional 98-gallon extended-range fuel tank (standard equipment being 67 gallons).

In 2016, the powertrain lineup for the Vision saw several introductions. Alongside the propane-fueled Ford V10, development of more Roush CleanTech fuel systems led to the introduction of gasoline and compressed natural gas (CNG) variants of the Vision. The CNG fuel option is available on the vision. The gasoline variant marked the first time since 2003 that a full-size school bus was available with a gasoline engine (the last example being the 2003 Blue Bird/GMC CV200).

For 2017 production, the Cummins diesel lineup was expanded by the introduction of the Cummins ISV5.0 turbodiesel 5.0L V8 (as seen in the Nissan Titan XD). For the Cummins ISB6.7, the 7-speed Eaton Procision dual-clutch transmission became an option, which was soon discontinued by the end of 2019. Blue Bird announced an electric version of the Vision in late 2017 that entered limited (special order only) production in 2018 and mass production 2019.

== Fourth generation (2022–present) ==
Blue Bird Vision (fourth generation)
- Current-generation Blue Bird Vision from Delaware

Overview
- Production: 2021-present
- Model years: 2022-present

Body and chassis
- Platform: Blue Bird proprietary chassis
- Chassis: Cowled chassis

Powertrain
- Engine: Cummins B6.7 6.7 L (409 cu in) I6 turbodiesel (2021-2026); Cummins B7.2 7.2 L (439 cu in) I6 turbodiesel (2027- ); Ford Godzilla 7.3 L (445 cu in) V8 LPG/propane (2022-present); Ford Godzilla 7.3 L (445 cu in) V10 gasoline (2022-present)
- Electric motor: 315 hp (234.9 kW) TM4 SUMO (2022-present)
- Transmission: Allison 5-speed automatic (Cummins engines); Allison 6-speed automatic (Cummins engines, optional); Ford 6R140 6-speed automatic (Ford V8)
- Hybrid drivetrain: Cummins 7000 1-speed direct drive (Electric)
- Battery: 194 kWh Li-ion
- Electric range: 120 mi (193.1 km)

Dimensions
- Wheelbase: 169–280 in (4.3–7.1 m)
- Length: 309–499 in (7.8–12.7 m)
- Width: 96 in (2.4 m) (overall); 91 in (2.3 m) (interior)
- Height: 128–128 in (3.3–3.3 m) (overall); 77 in (2.0 m) (interior)

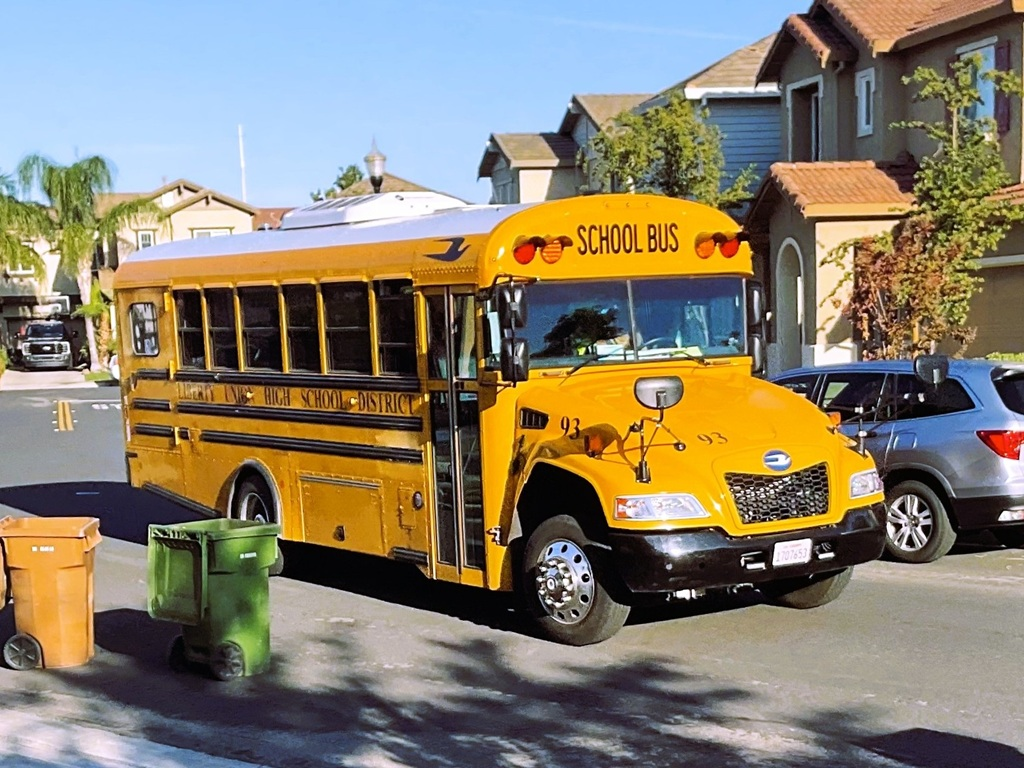
2025 Vision Diesel Handy Bus from California, with yellow grille and warning-light surrounds.

In the spring of 2021, the fourth-generation Vision was introduced for 2022 production. Externally distinguished by a honeycomb-style grille, the update was centered around the company switching its alternative-fuel platform to the Ford 7.3L Godzilla V8 in response to the Ford retirement of its Triton V10. While the CNG option was discontinued, the new engine continued with gasoline and propane fuel system options.

=== 2024 update ===
For the 2024 model year, the Vision included a visible update to its body as it adopted the same roofcap stampings as the Blue Bird All American, featuring additional black background surrounding the 8-way warning lights; the background surrounding the "School Bus" lettering changed shape from rectangular to a keystone shape. The Vision Electric saw upgrades to its drivetrain, increasing its overall batter capacity by nearly 25% and improving its charging time.

For 2025, the Vision underwent an upgrade to its safety features. In addition to 3-point passenger seatbelts becoming standard, the drivers' compartment was fitted with a steering-wheel airbag. To avoid crashes first-hand, the electronic stability control system gained a collision avoidance system. For 2026, the headlight clusters were changed to standard high-intensity LED units, moving to a clear-lens design with a black background.

For 2027 production, the Cummins B6.7 diesel was replaced the all-new Cummins B7.2 unit.

== Powertrain ==
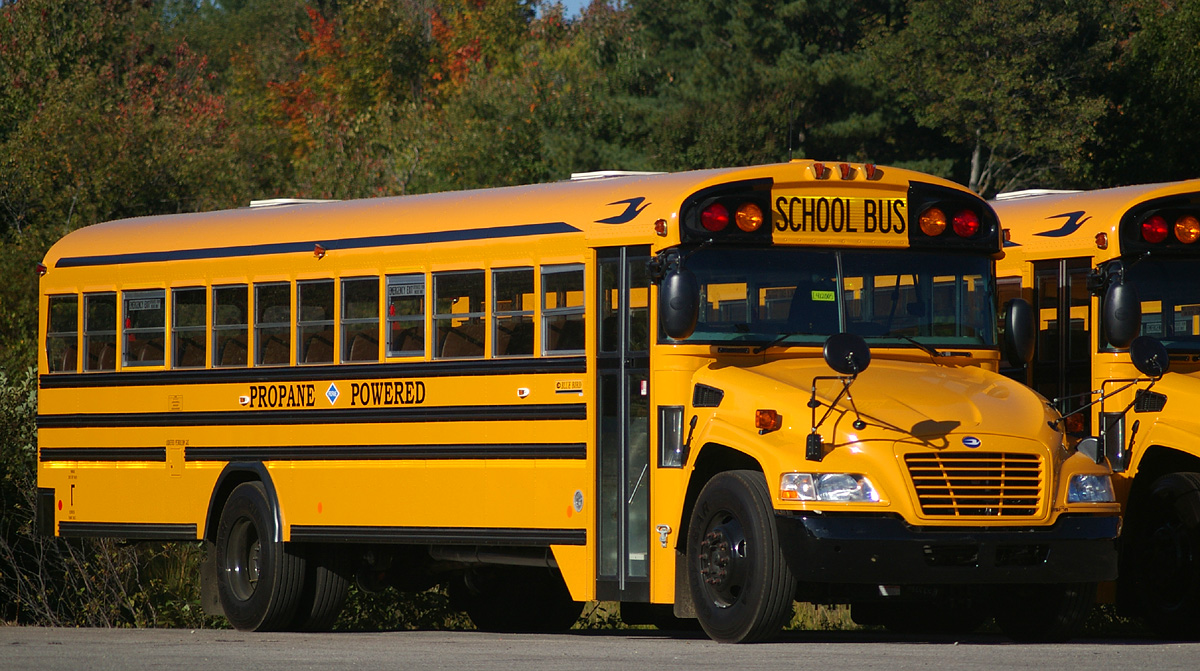
2010 propane-powered Vision (with GM 8.1L Vortec V8)

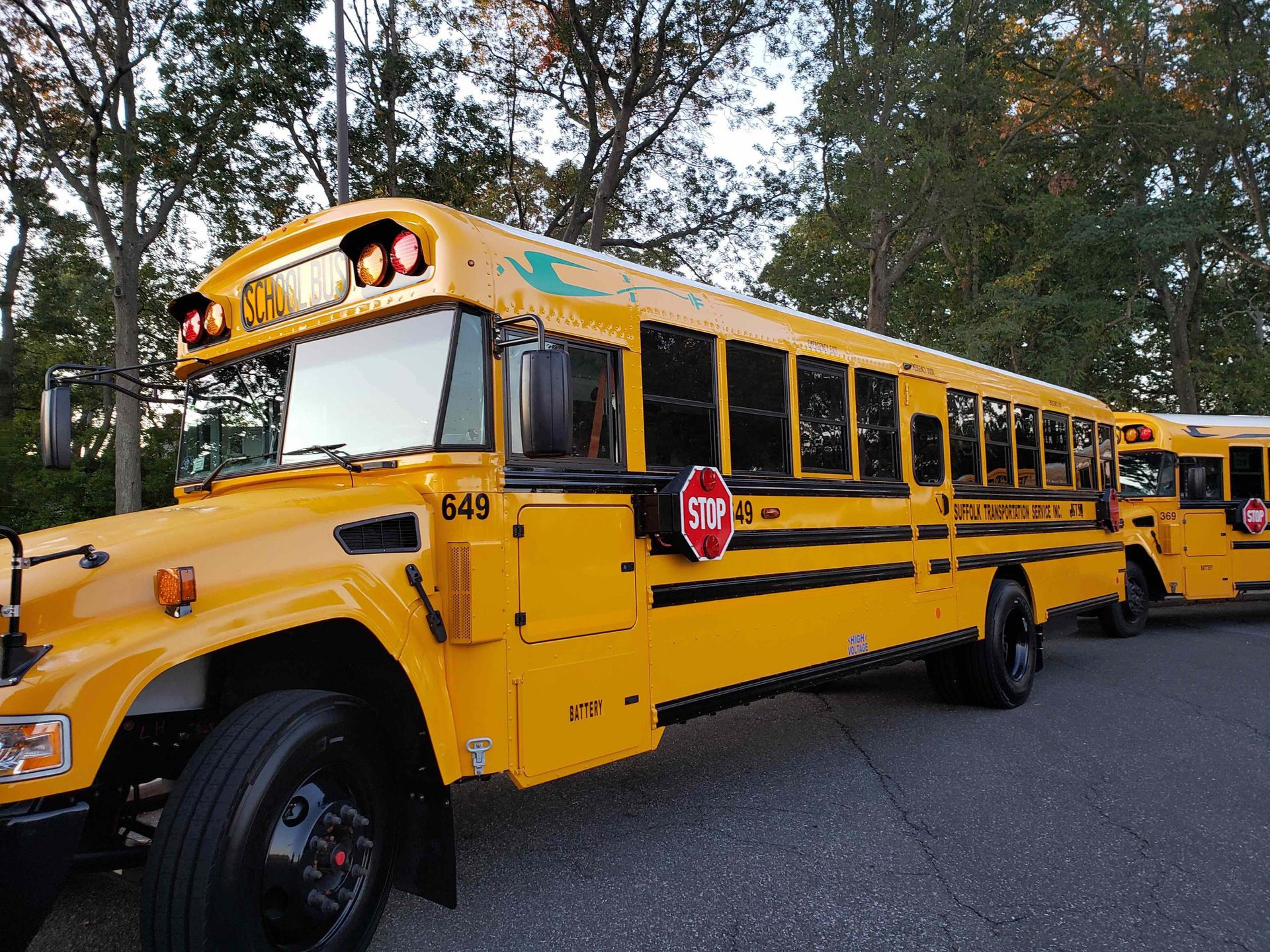
2020 Blue Bird Electric, version has green Blue Bird roof emblem styled with electric cord

As with its Blue Bird Conventional predecessor, the Blue Bird Vision is offered with a diesel-fuel engine as standard equipment. Coinciding with other alternative-fuel vehicles from the company, the Blue Bird Vision is offered with propane/LPG, compressed natural gas, and gasoline. As of current production, the Ford 7.3 L Godzilla V8 serves as the platform for alternative-fuel systems.

Since 2019, the Vision has been offered as a battery-electric vehicle, using a Cummins/Accelera-developed powertrain.

Externally, in addition to the fuel fill/charge port labeling, the fuel system type can be distinguished by the design of the Blue Bird company logo. The Vision Diesel is fitted with a traditional black-painted roof emblem, with blue or green designating the Vision Gasoline and Vision Propane, respectively. The Vision Electric features a green emblem with a stylized electric cord following it.

Engine	Configuration	Years produced	Fuel	Transmission	Notes
Diesel engines
Caterpillar C7	7.2 L (441 cu in) inline-6	2004–2009	Diesel	Allison 2000 (2004–2007) Allison PTS 2300 (2007–2011) Allison PTS 2500 (2007–present) Allison PTS 3000 (2010–present)	Standard engine at production launch Discontinued as Caterpillar exited on-highway engine production.
Cummins ISB6.7	6.7 L (409 cu in) inline-6	2008–2018	Diesel	Allison 2000 (2004–2007) Allison PTS 2300 (2007–2011) Allison PTS 2500 (2007–present) Allison PTS 3000 (2010–present)	Replaced by B6.7 in 2018
Cummins ISV 5.0	5.0 L (305 cu in) V8	2016 - 2019	Diesel	Allison 2000 (2004–2007) Allison PTS 2300 (2007–2011) Allison PTS 2500 (2007–present) Allison PTS 3000 (2010–present)	First V8 diesel in Type C Blue Bird since 2008 discontinuation of Blue Bird SBCV (International 3300/MaxxForce 7)
Cummins B6.7	6.7 L (409 cu in) inline-6	2018–2026	Diesel	Allison 2000 (2004–2007) Allison PTS 2300 (2007–2011) Allison PTS 2500 (2007–present) Allison PTS 3000 (2010–present)	Eaton Procision dual-clutch optional beginning with 2017 production. (discontinued by end of 2019)
Cummins B7.2	7.2 L (439 cu in) inline-6	2026-present	Diesel	Allison 2000 (2004–2007) Allison PTS 2300 (2007–2011) Allison PTS 2500 (2007–present) Allison PTS 3000 (2010–present)	Replaced B6.7L for model year 2027 (engine MY)
Alternative-fuel powerplants
General Motors L18 (Vortec 8100)	8.1 L (496 cu in) OHV V8	2009–2011	Propane/LPG	Allison PTS 2300	First original-equipment school bus sold with a propane-fueled engine (instead of a conversion). Production of this variant discontinued as supply of General Motors engines ended.
Ford Modular (Triton) V10	6.8 L (413 cu in) SOHC V10	2012–2021 (propane) 2016–2021 (gasoline and CNG)	Propane/LPG (2012–2021) Gasoline (2016–2021) Compressed Natural Gas (2016–2021)	Ford 6R140 6-speed automatic	Ford engine replaced discontinued General Motors engine. Developed with a ROUSH CleanTech propane/LPG fuel system. 2016 production introduced an option of regular gasoline fuel system & also a CNG fuel system
Ford Godzilla V8	7.3 L (445 cu in) OHV V8	2022–present	Propane/LPG Gasoline	Ford 6R140 6-speed automatic	Replaced discontinued 6.8 L Triton V10 Uses redesigned Roush CleanTech fuel system for both gasoline and propane fuels
TM4 SUMO	Electric motor 315 hp 2,400 lb-ft torque	2019–present	Electric power	Cummins PowerDrive 7000	155 kWh batteries Vehicle-to-grid capability (V2G).

== Comparable products ==
- IC Bus CE Series
- Thomas Saf-T-Liner C2
