= International Harvester =

American manufacturing company (1902–1985)

International Harvester Company
- Industry: Agricultural; Automotive
- Predecessor: McCormick Harvesting Machine Company; Deering Harvester Company; Warder, Bushnell, and Glessner; Milwaukee; Plano
- Founded: March 22, 1902; 124 years ago
- Founders: Charles Deering; Cyrus Hall McCormick Jr.; George Walbridge Perkins
- Defunct: 1985
- Fate: Renamed as Navistar International Corporation
- Successor: Navistar International; Case IH; McCormick Tractors International
- Headquarters: Chicago, Illinois, U.S.
- Area served: Worldwide
- Products: Farm machinery; Vocational trucks; Household appliances; Automobiles; Construction and industrial equipment

The International Harvester Company (often abbreviated IH or International) was an American manufacturer of agricultural and construction equipment, automobiles, commercial trucks, lawn and garden products, household equipment, and more. It was formed from the 1902 merger of the McCormick Harvesting Machine Company, Deering Harvester Company, and three smaller manufacturers: Milwaukee; Plano; and Warder, Bushnell, and Glessner (manufacturers of the Champion brand). Its brands included McCormick, Deering, and later McCormick-Deering, as well as International. Along with the Farmall and Cub Cadet tractors, International was also known for the Scout and Travelall vehicle nameplates. In the 1980s all divisions were sold off except for International Trucks, which changed its parent company name to Navistar International.

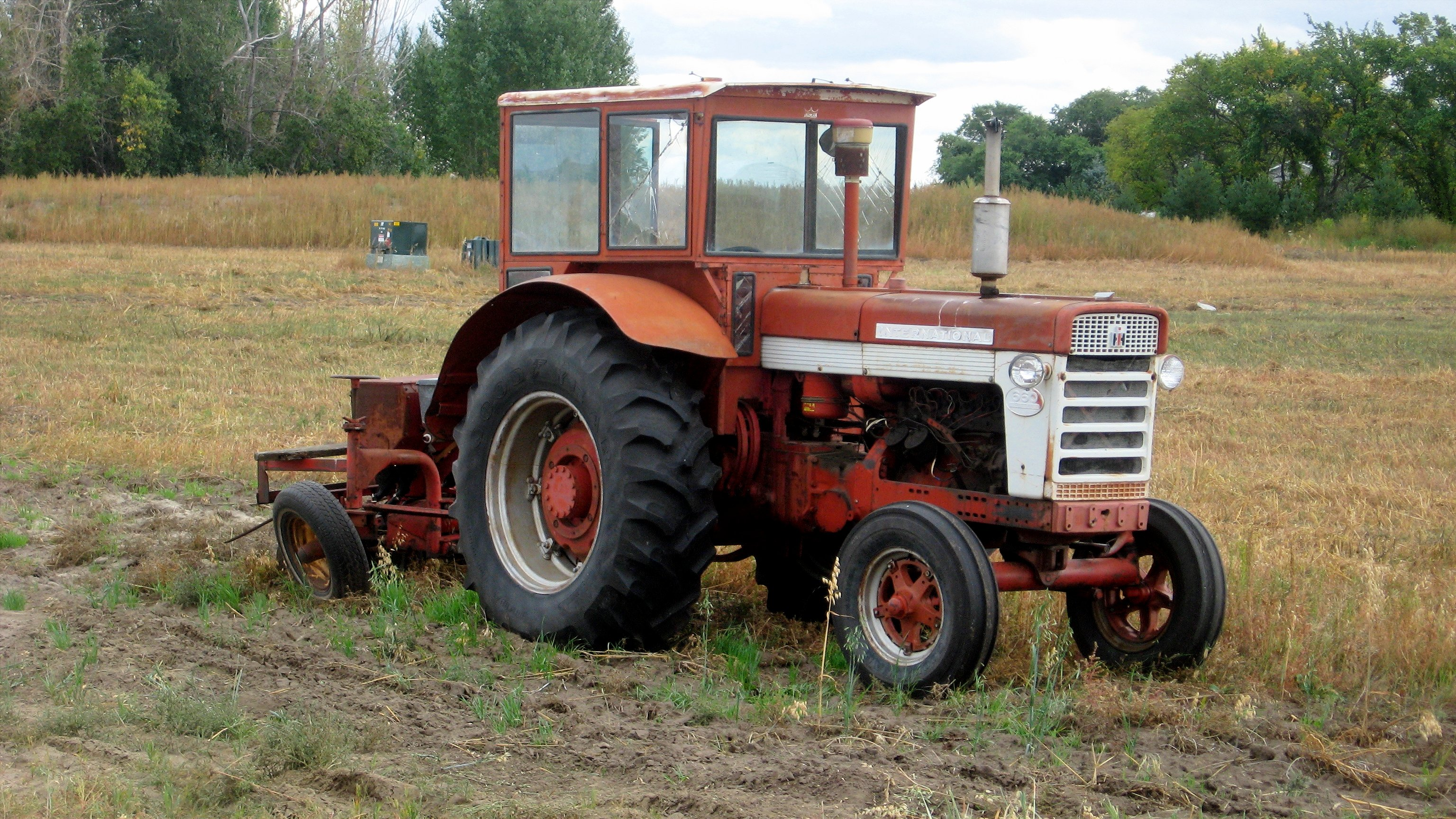
International 660 in rural Saskatchewan

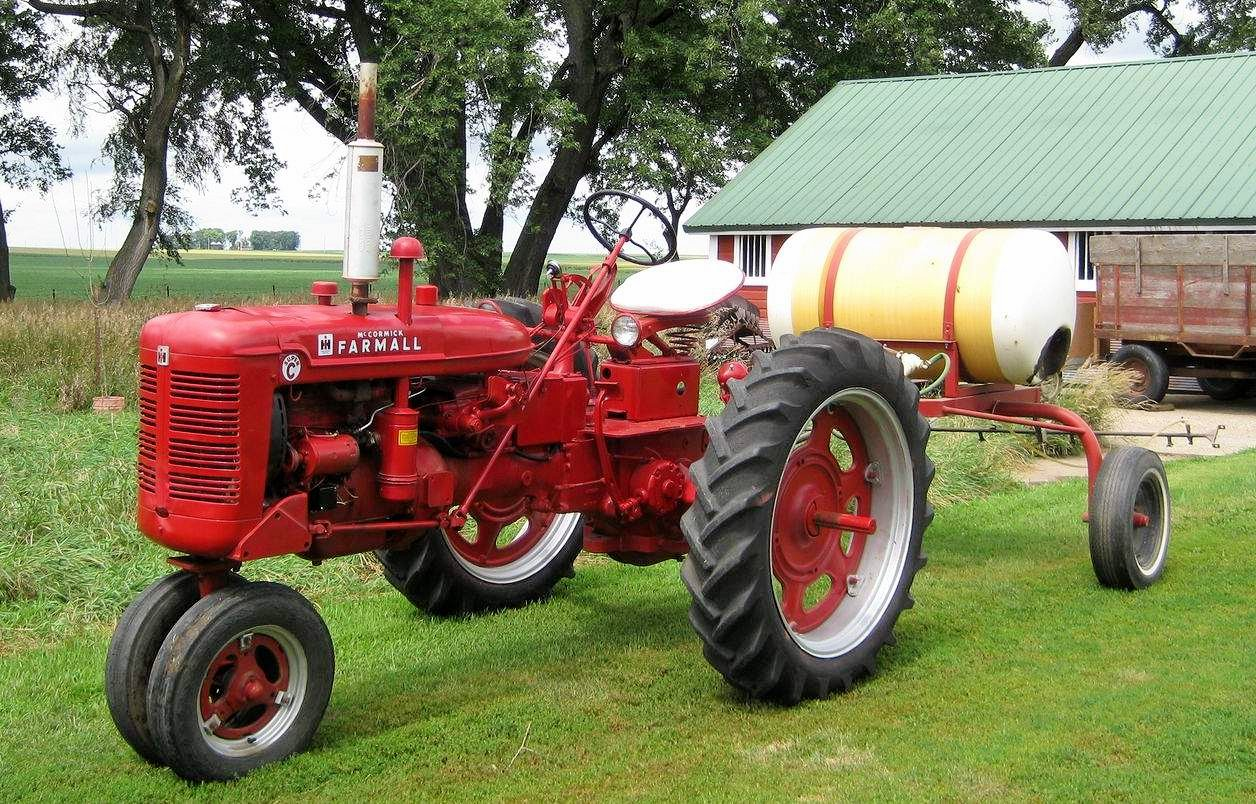
A 1954 IH Farmall Super C

Given its importance to the economies of rural communities the brand continues to have a cult following. The International Harvester legacy non-profits host some of the largest agriculture related events in the United States.

Following years of financial and economic decline, International began selling its separate equipment divisions, starting with the sale of the construction division to Dresser Industries in 1982. In November 1984 IH finalized a deal with Tenneco to sell the farm equipment division to Tenneco's subsidiary Case Corporation, and the brand continues as Case IH, which is owned by CNH. The European division exists today as McCormick Tractors and is owned by ARGO SpA of Italy. International became solely a truck and engine manufacturer and brand and reorganized as Navistar International in 1986. Throughout its existence International Harvester was headquartered in Chicago, Illinois. In 2020, Volkswagen agreed to fully purchase the remaining shares of Navistar. In 2024, Navistar changed its name to International Motors, LLC.

== History ==
=== Founding ===
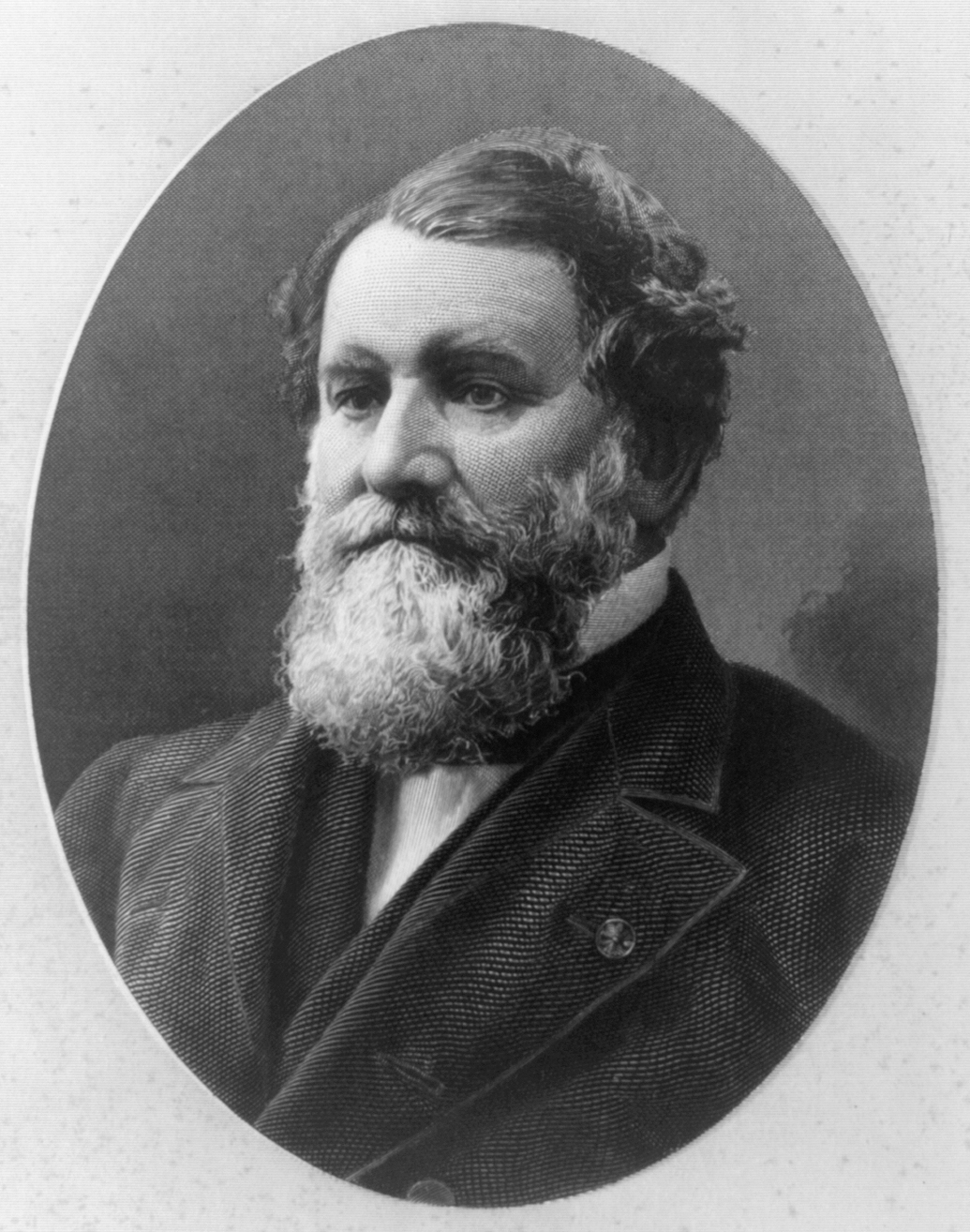
Cyrus Hall McCormick patented an early mechanical reaper.

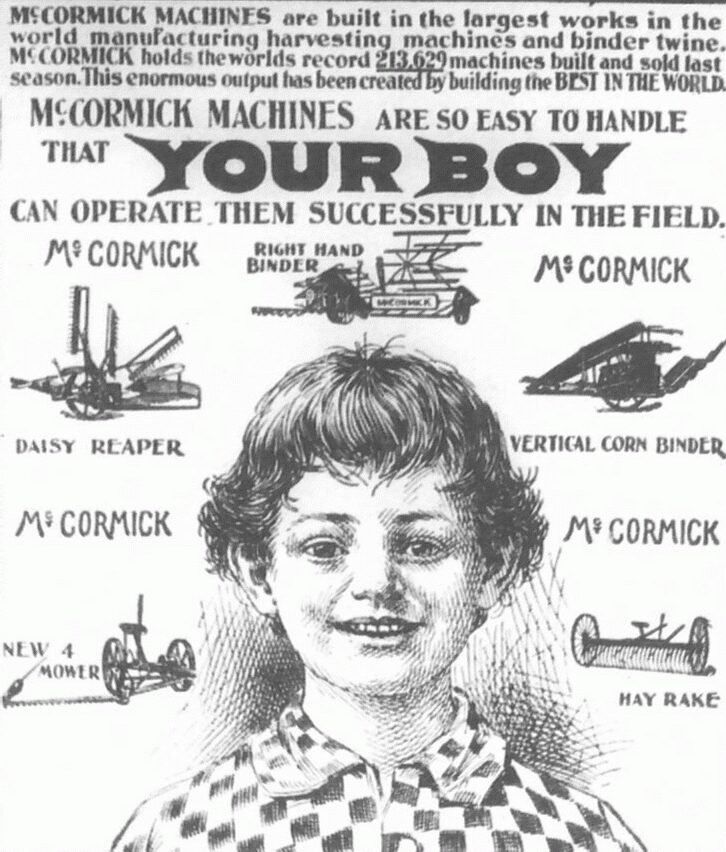
1900 ad for McCormick farm machines—"Your boy can operate them"

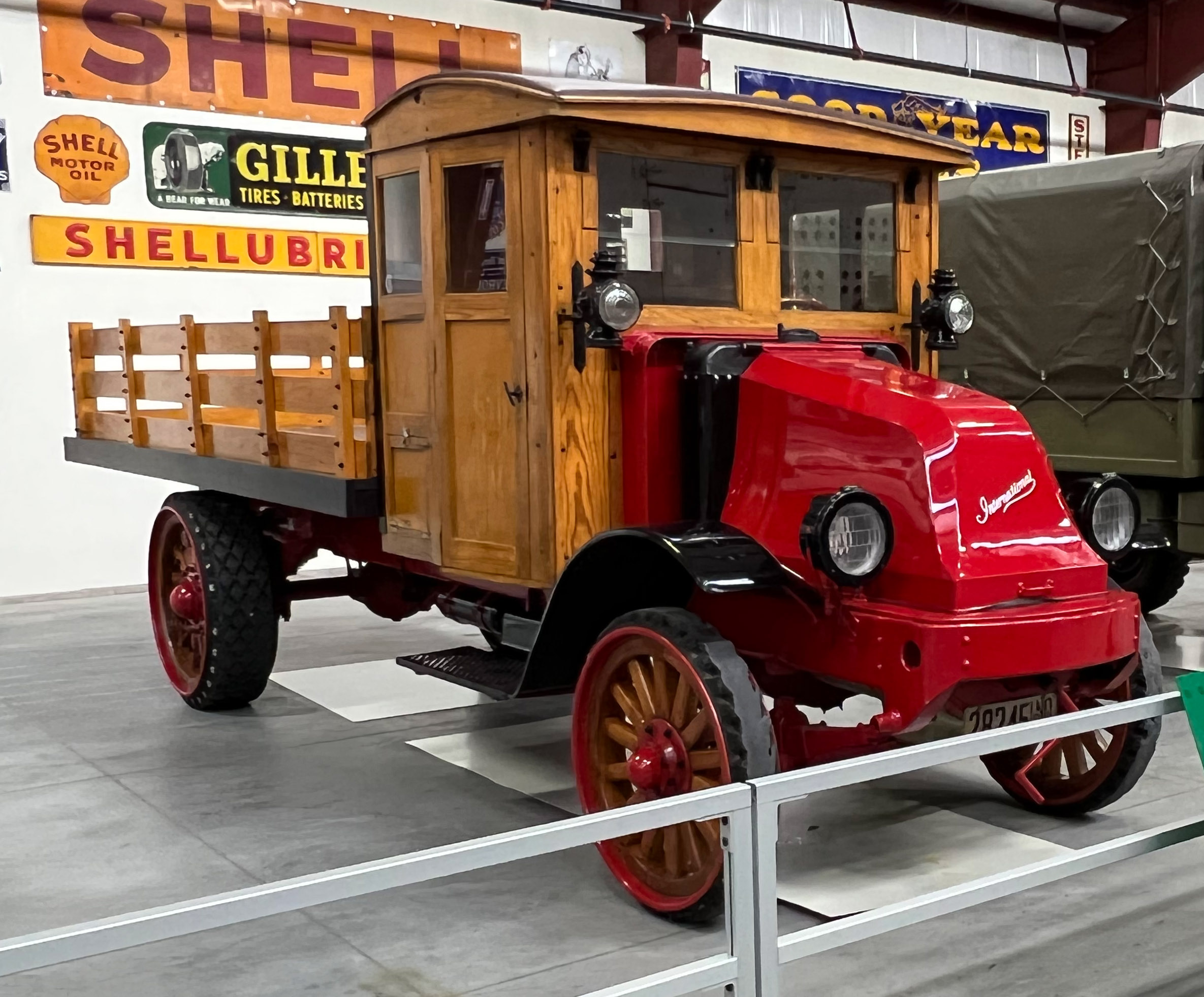
1921 International Harvester Model 101 on display at the Iowa 80 Trucking Museum, Walcott, Iowa.

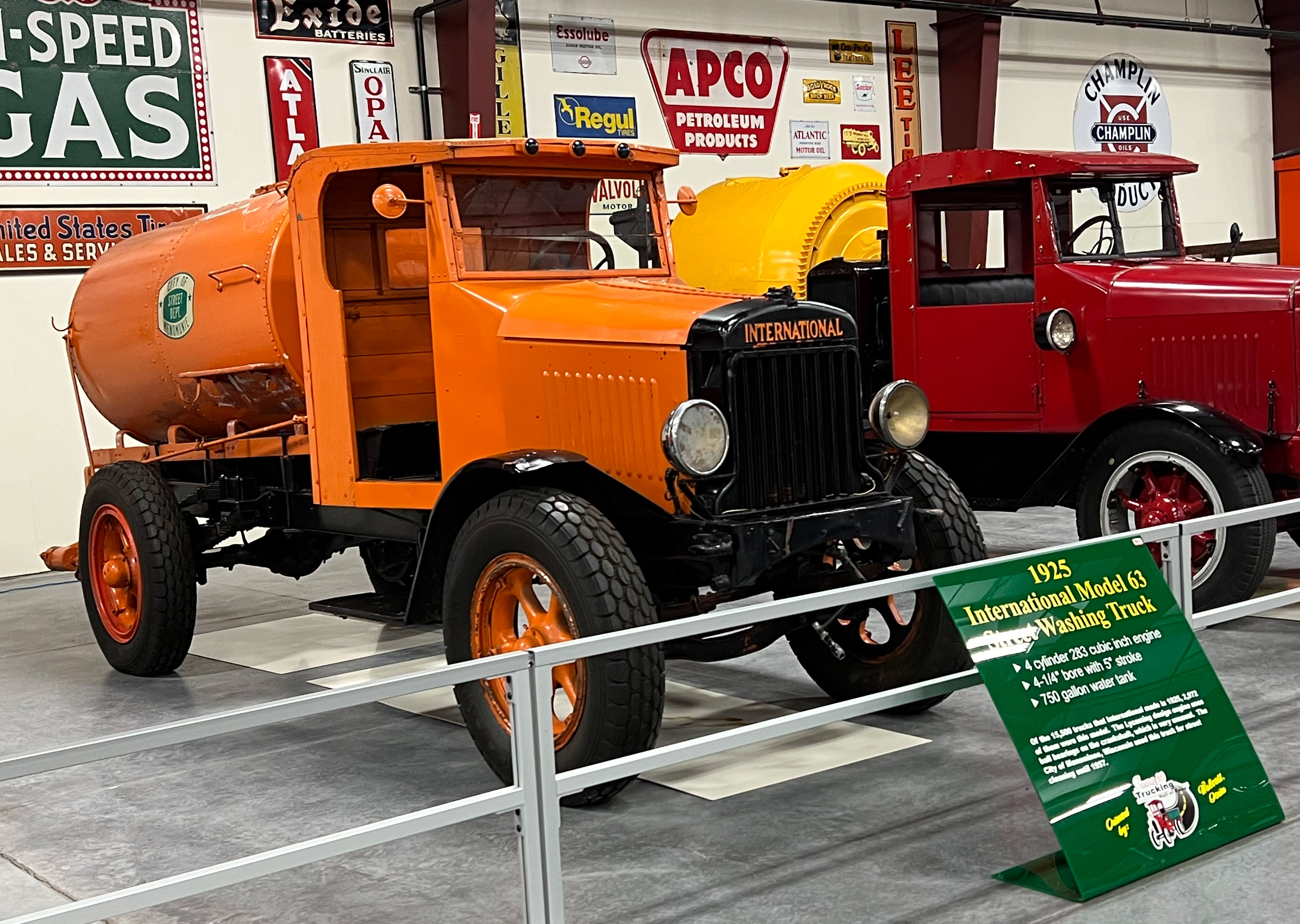
1925 International Model 63 Street-Washing Truck on display at the Iowa 80 Trucking Museum, Walcott, Iowa.

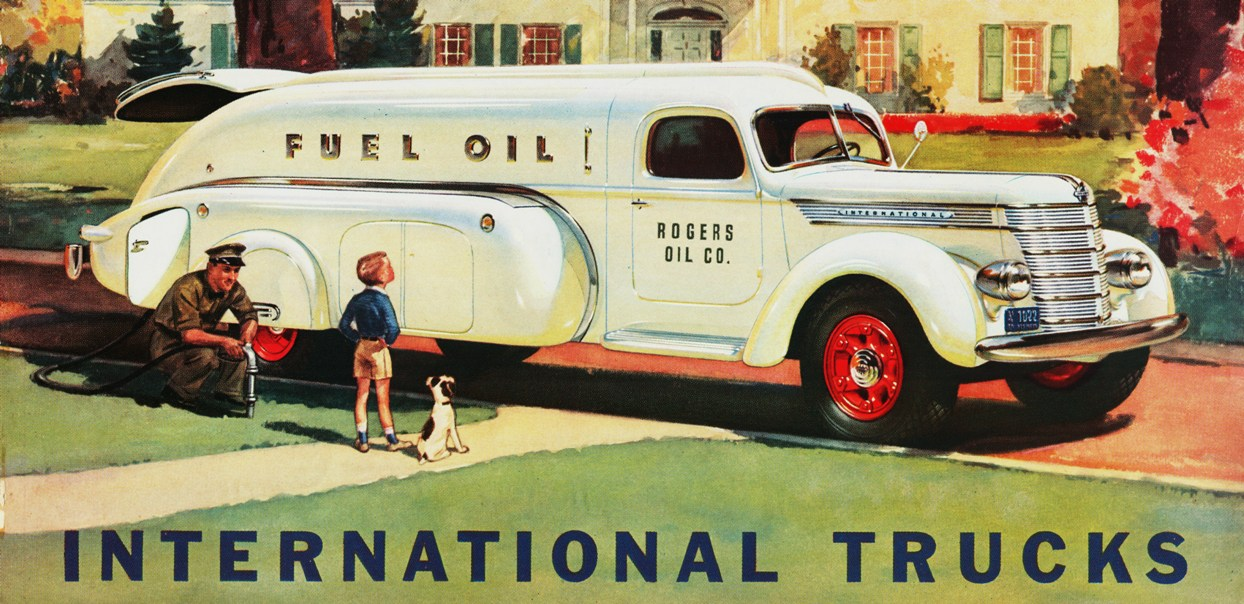
Advertisement for the 1940 International Tanker Truck

The roots of International Harvester run to the 1830s, when Virginia inventor Cyrus Hall McCormick perfected his version of a horse-drawn reaper, which he field-demonstrated in 1831 and patented in 1834. He and his brother Leander J. McCormick moved to Chicago in 1847 to be closer to the Midwestern grain fields, and there founded the McCormick Harvesting Machine Company. The reaper sold well, partially as a result of savvy and innovative business practices. Their products came onto the market just as the development of railroads offered wide distribution to distant territories. He developed a vast support network to demonstrate field operations. McCormick died in 1884 and his company passed to his son, Cyrus McCormick, Jr.

In 1902, the McCormick Harvesting Machine Company and Deering Harvester Company, along with three smaller agricultural equipment firms (Milwaukee Harvesting Machine Co., Plano Manufacturing Co., and Warder, Bushnell, and Glessner—manufacturers of Champion brand) merged to create the International Harvester Company. The most important motivation for the merger was the elimination of competition to increase profits. Banker J. P. Morgan provided the financing. The architect of the merger was George W. Perkins, one of the Morgan executives who Cyrus McCormick described as the "most brilliant negotiator he had ever known." The new company was valued at $150 million.

After a few more years of squabbling the young International Harvester became a near monopoly in reapers, and a major factor in many other farm implements. In 1908 it made 700,000 harvesters worldwide, for $73 million. In addition to 25,000 IH employees there were 42,000 working in its local agencies all over the U.S. and parts of Europe. In 1919, IH bought the Parlin and Orendorff factory in Canton, Illinois, a leader in plow manufacturing, renaming it Canton Works.

=== Sustained success ===
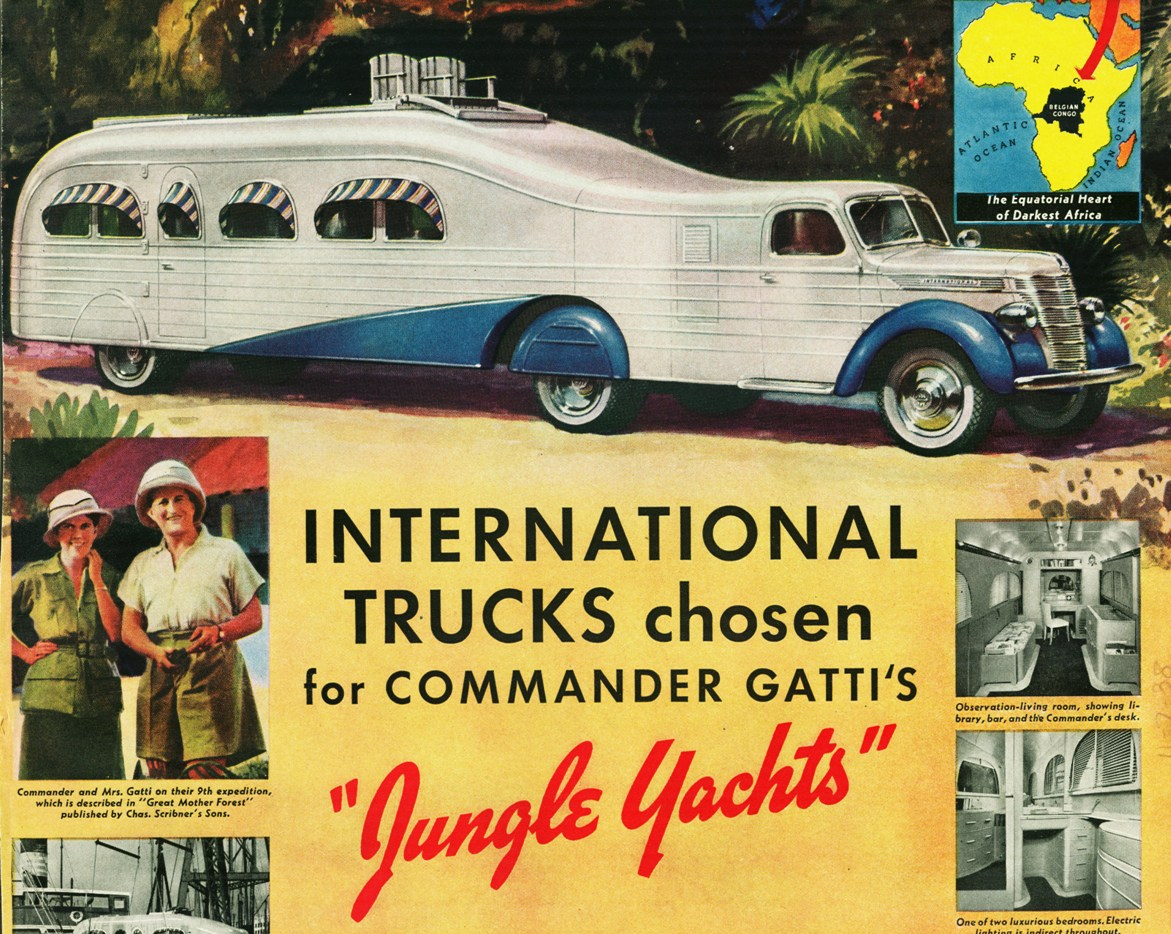
1939 advertisement for the International "Jungle Yacht" tractor-trailer, for Attilio Gatti's luxury scientific expedition in the Belgian Congo

In 1926, IH's Farmall Works built a new plant in Rock Island, Illinois. By 1930, the 100,000th Farmall was produced. IH next set their sights on introducing a true 'general-purpose' tractor to satisfy the needs of the average American family farmer. The resulting 'letter' series of Raymond Loewy-designed Farmall tractors in 1939 proved a huge success. IH dominated the market through the 1950s despite stiff competition from Ford, Allis-Chalmers, Massey Ferguson and John Deere.

IH ranked 33rd among United States corporations in the value of World War II production contracts. Different plants of the corporation produced torpedoes and their components, artillery systems and their parts, artillery shells and some civilian products for the military like bulldozers and truck engines. In 1946 IH acquired a defense plant in Louisville, Kentucky, which was adapted for production of the Farmall A, B, and the new 340 tractors. It acquired the Metropolitan Body Company of Bridgeport, Connecticut, in 1948. The commercially successful Metro line of forward control vans and trucks were produced here from 1938 until 1964.

In 1970, Pacific Trucks was purchased. In 1974, the five-millionth IHC tractor, a 1066, was produced at the Rock Island Farmall plant.

Throughout the 1960s and 1970s, despite good sales, IH's profit margins remained slim. The continual addition of unrelated business lines created a somewhat unwieldy corporate organization. Overly conservative management and a rigid policy of in-house promotion tended to stifle new management strategies and technical innovation. IH faced strong competition and increased production costs, primarily due to labor and government-imposed environmental and safety regulations.

=== Downfall ===
In 1977, International Harvester named Archie McCardell as its new CEO, who embarked on a strategy to drastically cut costs and improve profit margins. Unprofitable lines were terminated, and factory production was scaled back, resulting in profits reaching their highest levels in ten years by the end of the year, although cash reserves remained low. This strategy led to growing dissatisfaction among union members. In anticipation of labor disputes, IH braced for a strike. On November 1, 1979, just as the company announced a $1.8 million bonus for McCardell, the United Auto Workers called a strike the following day. The protracted strike eventually cost the company almost $600 million, equivalent to $2.7 billion in 2025.

By 1981, IH's finances were at their lowest point ever, and investors had lost faith in the company and its management. In 1982, Louis W. Menk, who was a former president and CEO of the Burlington Northern Railroad, was appointed as IH's new chairman and CEO. Under Menk's guidance, IH went through a twenty-month reorganization process, and he hired a new management team. Menk also ensured that IH made necessary cutbacks, and it involved the sale of the company's Payline division of construction equipment to Dresser Industries. Further assets were sold to Tenneco Inc., in 1984.

Following the merger, tractor production at Farmall Works ceased in 1985. Production of the new Case IH tractors moved to J.I. Case in Racine, Wisconsin. Production of IH Axial-Flow combines continued at the East Moline, Illinois, factory. The Memphis Works plant was closed. The truck and engine divisions remained and in 1986, Harvester changed the corporate name to Navistar International Corporation, having sold the International Harvester name to Tenneco. Navistar International Corporation continues to manufacture medium- and heavy-duty trucks, school buses, and engines under the International brand name.

== Divisions and products ==
=== Agriculture Division ===
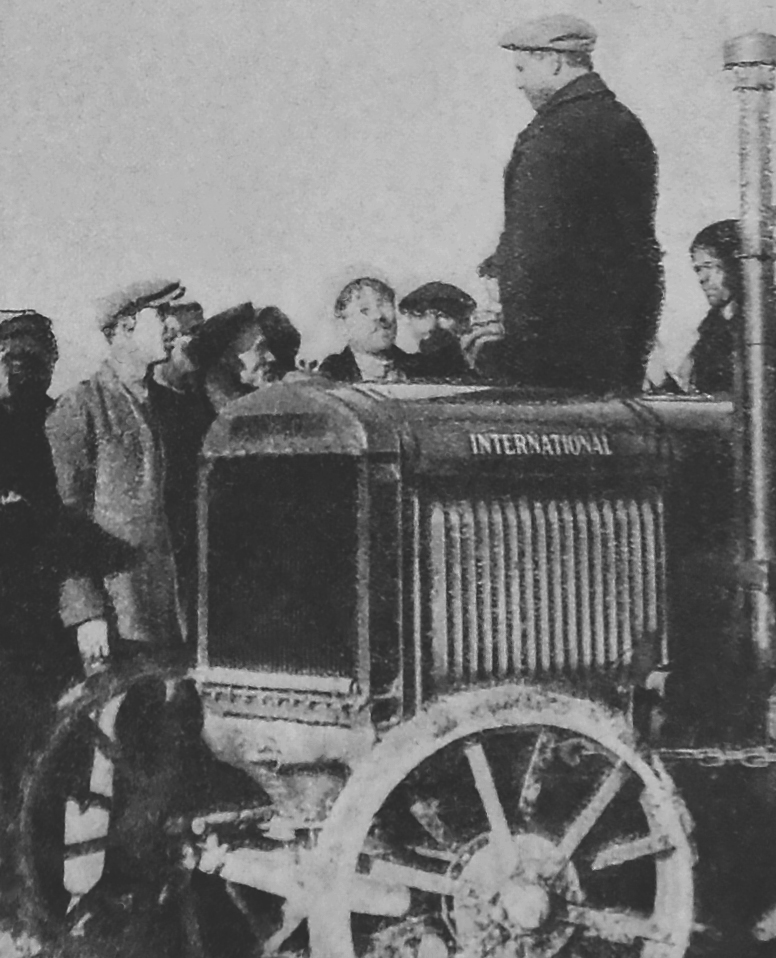
McCormick-Deering 15–30 on the fields of the Ukrainian SSR in 1930

The International Harvester Agricultural Division may have been second to the Truck Division but it was the best-known subsidiary. One of its early products was the Traction Engine, a frame manufactured by Morton Traction Truck Company (later bought by IHC) featuring an IHC engine.

From 1902 to the early 1920s, the McCormick and Deering dealerships kept their original branding with Mogul tractors sold by McCormick and Titan tractors at Deering due to the still-present competitiveness of the former rivals.

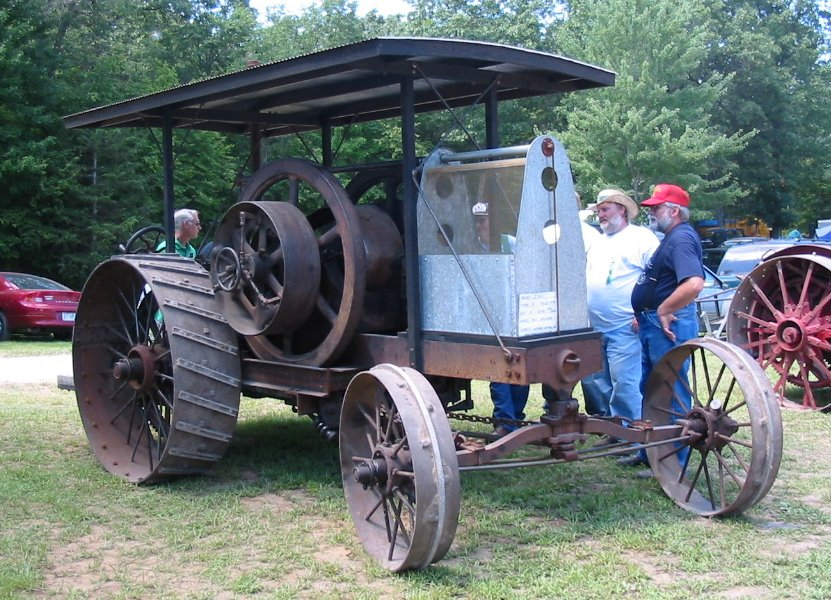
An International Harvester Type A tractor, manufactured from 1908 to 1913

==== The early tractors ====
IH produced a range of large gasoline-powered farm tractors under the Mogul and Titan brands. Sold by McCormick dealers, the Type C Mogul was little more than a stationary engine on a tractor chassis, fitted with friction drive (one speed forward, one reverse). Between 1911 and 1914, 862 were built. These tractors had varied success but the trend going into the mid-1910s was toward "small" and "cheap".

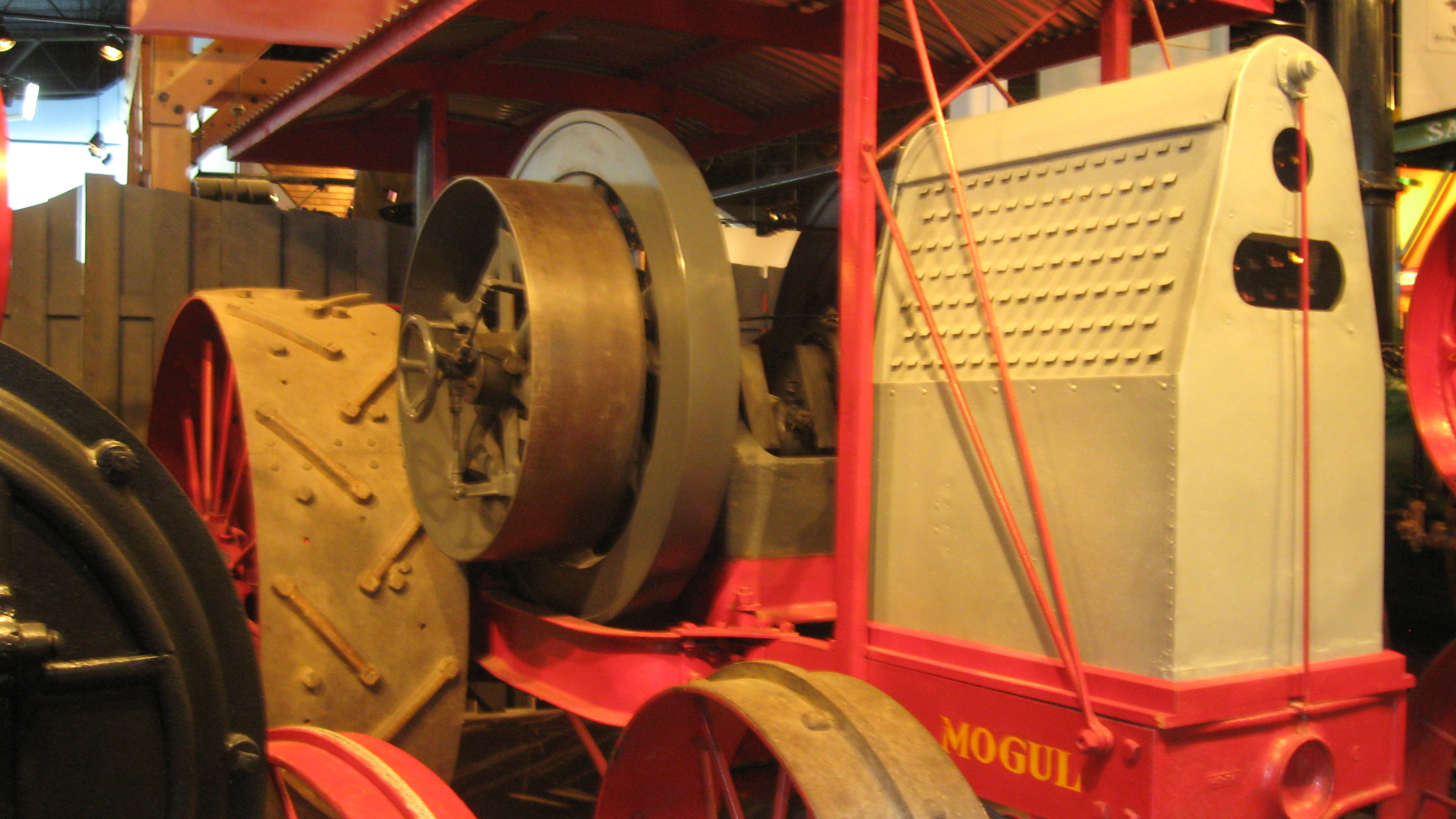
A 1911 one-cylinder 25 hp (19 kW) Type C Mogul

The company's first important tractors were the 10-20 and 15-30 models. Introduced in 1915, they were primarily used as traction engines to pull plows and for belt work on threshing machines. The 10-20 and 15-30 had similar Mogul and Titan versions.

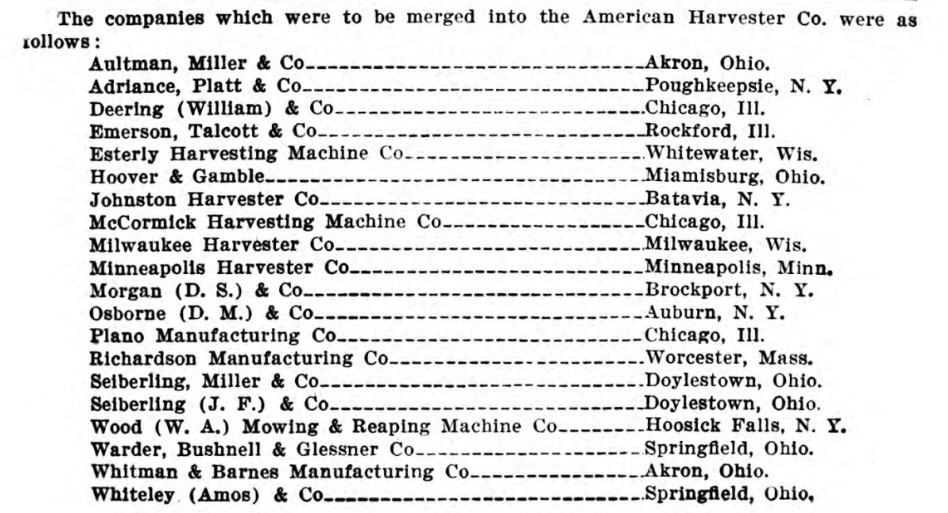
International Harvester, merged Companys (1913)

Concurrently, IHC purchased a number of smaller competitors. Parlin & Orendorff (P&O Plow) and Chattanooga Plow were purchased in 1919. Other brand names they incorporated include Keystone, D.M. Osborne, Kemp, Meadows, Sterling, Weber, Plano, and Champion.

In 1924 IH introduced the Farmall, a smaller general-purpose tractor, to fend off competition from Ford Motor Company's Fordson tractors. Farmall was a leader in the emerging row-crop tractor segment.

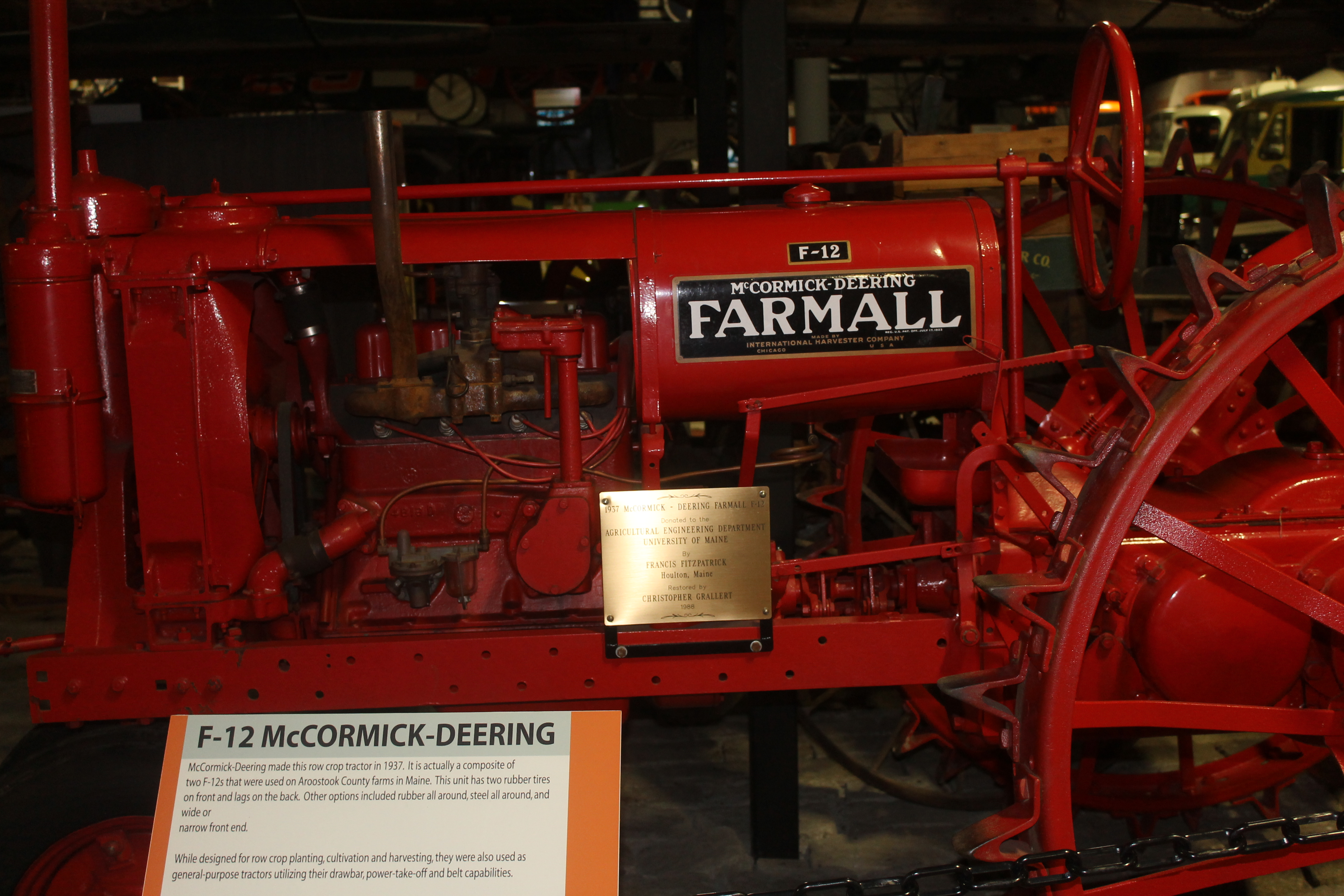
A 1937 McCormick-Deering Farmall F-12 tractor on display at the Cole Land Transportation Museum in Bangor, Maine

Following IH's introduction of Farmall, they introduced several similarly styled "F Series" models while continuing to sell the original design as the "Regular."

In 1932, IH produced their first diesel engine for the McCormick-Deering TD-40 crawler. This engine would start on gasoline and then switch to diesel. Other diesel engines of this era were difficult to start in cold weather and using gasoline allowed the engine to thoroughly warm up first. In 1935, it was used in the WD-40, becoming the first diesel tractor on wheels in North America (the world's first diesel tractor was Germany's Benz-Sendling BS 6 in 1922).

==== Heavy tractors ====
The market for industrial tractors grew in the 1930s. The TD-40, the first of IH's heavy-equipment crawlers, was suited for a wide range of environments. As demand for construction equipment grew, so did the competition. The diversification of the agricultural tractor range into genuine construction equipment whetted appetites for further expansion. In 1937 IH engaged designer Raymond Loewy to revamp its product line and logo. In 1938 the first such model was the TD-65 heavy tractor, later renamed the TD-18.

==== The letter and standard series ====
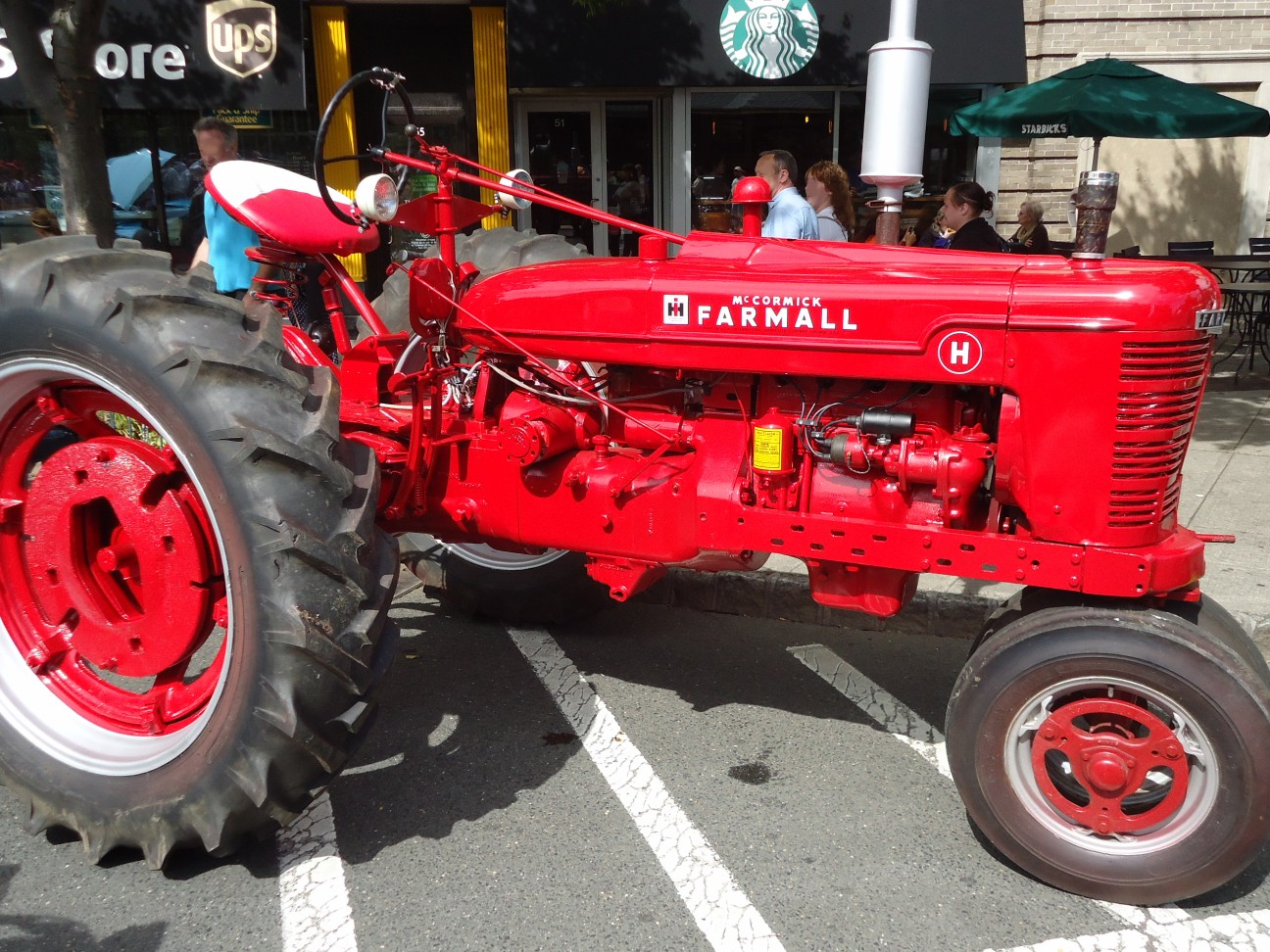
A McCormick Farmall H

For model year 1939, Raymond Loewy created the styling for the Farmall "letter series" (A, B, BN, C, H, and M) and the McCormick-Deering "standard series" (W-4, W-6, and W-9). For 1941 the MD model was introduced as the first row crop diesel-powered tractor; over a decade later, IH's largest competitor, John Deere, introduced a diesel option on their row crop models. The letter series tractors were updated to the "super" series in 1953 (with the exception of the A, which had become a "super" in 1947, and the B and BN, which were discontinued in 1948). Many of these tractors (especially the largest, the H, M, and W models) are still in operation on farms today. Especially desirable are the diesel-powered MD, WD-6, and WD-9's.

The letter and standard series of tractors was produced until 1954 and was a defining product in IH history.

In 1947, the smallest tractor in the Farmall line was introduced, the Cub. With a 60-cu. in., four-cylinder engine and a 69-inch wheelbase, the Cub was aimed at small farms that had previously relied on horse-drawn equipment. Like the various John Deere L/LA/LI models, one of the "mechanization-resistant" markets it hoped to penetrate was the small one-mule family farms of the rural American Deep South, but the Cub also sold to owners of larger farms needing a second tractor. Production of the Cub commenced at the newly acquired and updated Farmall Works-Louisville plant (formerly the wartime Curtiss-Wright Aircraft factory in Louisville, Kentucky). Selling for $545 in 1947, the Cub proved extremely popular and its design continued largely unchanged mechanically until 1979.

For 1955 in IH tractors, the numbered "hundred series" was offered. Although given slightly different styling and few new features, they were still updates to the models introduced in 1939. The only new tractor in the 1955 lineup was the 300 Utility. In 1957 power was increased in some models and the 230 Utility was introduced.

==== Heavy tractors: the 1950s ====
IH would sell 38,000 TD-18 series tractors between 1938 and 1958. The TD-18 would be replaced by an upgraded TD-18A in 1949 and 181/182 variants in 1955. In 1958 the TD-20 crawler was introduced.

==== 60 Series recall ====
In July 1958, IH launched a major campaign to introduce a new line of tractors, the 60 series. At the Hinsdale, Illinois, Testing Farm, IH entertained over 12,000 dealers from over 25 countries. The series included the first-of-its-kind six-cylinder 460 and 560 tractors. Unfortunately just a year later, these models were recalled due to final drive component failures. They had not been updated since 1939 and would fail rapidly under the stress of the more powerful 60-series engines. Some customers lost faith in IH and migrated to John Deere's New Generation of Power tractors introduced in 1960.

==== 1960s ====
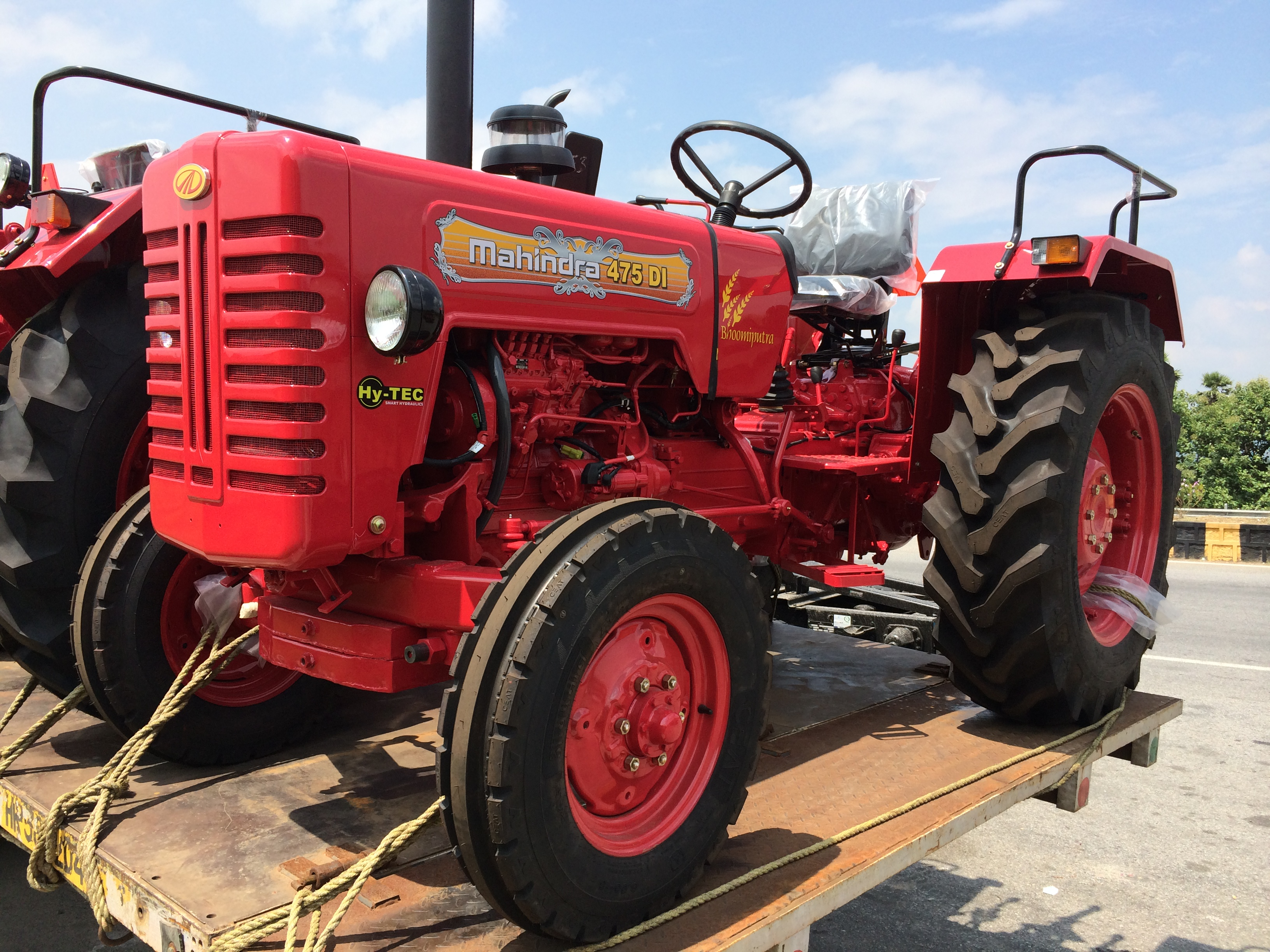
The originally British-built International B275 model still in production in India and built by Mahindra and Mahindra

Throughout the 1960s, IH introduced new tractors and new sales techniques. As producing tractors was the lifeblood of the company, IH would have to remain competitive in this field. They both succeeded and failed at this goal but farming was about to change. In 1963, IH introduced the 73 hp (54 kW) 706 and 95 hp (71 kW) 806 tractors. Until the 88 series, all numbered series tractors followed a simple numbering system. The first 2-3 digits was the horsepower rating, and the last number was the number of cylinders, so a 1486 was rated 148 hp and had a 6 cyl. engine, while the 1468 had 146 hp and a v8 engine. In 1964, IH made its four-millionth tractor, an 806. In 1965, IH introduced its first 100 hp (75 kW) two-wheel-drive tractor, the 1206. Another option became available in 1965 for the 706, 806, and the new 1206: a factory-installed cab (made by Stopler Allen Co.), often called the "ice cream box" due to its shape. It could be equipped with a fan and heater. By 1967, over 100,000 models 706, 806, and 1206 were built. The 276 was also built at this time, becoming popular for smaller farms with tighter lanes and fields due to its lighter weight.

In 1967 was the introduction of the bigger and more powerful 56 series tractors as replacements for the popular "06" series. These new models included the 65 hp (48 kW) 656, 76 hp (57 kW) 756, the 101 hp (75 kW) 856, and the 116 hp (87 kW) 1256. The "ice cream box" cab was still an option. In 1969 IH introduced the 1456 Turbo at 131 hp (98 kW). Also that year, the company introduced the 91 hp (68 kW) with the option of gearshift or hydrostatic transmissions. They replaced the "ice cream box" cab, and replaced it with a new "custom" Exel Industries-made cab that could be equipped with factory air-conditioning, heat, and an AM radio. Another milestone was the 1970 introduction of the 1026 Hydro, basically a hydrostatic version of the 1256 and at that time the most powerful hydrostatic transmission tractor made in the US with 114 hp (85 kW).

==== 1970s ====
In 1971, IH introduced the 66 series line. The new models included the 85 hp (63 kW) 766, the 101 hp (75 kW) 966, the 125 hp (93 kW) 1066 turbo, the 145 hp (108 kW) 1466 Turbo, and the 145 hp (108 kW) 1468 V-8. The 130 hp (97 kW) 4166 4WD was also introduced. The 966 and 1066 were available with Hydro or gearshift transmissions and the choice of two-post roll over protection structures (ROPs) or two different cabs, the "custom" and the "deluxe". Both could be equipped with air conditioning, heat, and AM-FM radios.

In 1972, the 666 replaced the long-running 656, the 150 hp (110 kW) 1568 V-8 replaced the 1468, and the 160 hp (120 kW) 1566 and the 163 hp (122 kW) 4366 4WD were introduced. Also later that year, four-post ROPs replaced two-post; the "custom" cab was dropped and the "deluxe" cab was now painted red instead of white. Due to horsepower confusions, the 966 and 1066 Hydro models were restriped; the Hydro 100 and the 666 Hydro became the Hydro 70. On February 1, 1974, at 9:00 am, the five-millionth tractor came off the assembly line at the Farmall Plant in Illinois; IH was the first tractor manufacturer to reach that number. Also in 1973, IH officially dropped the "Farmall" name from its tractors, ending a name that had begun with the first Farmall "Regular" in 1924.

The 230 hp (170 kW) 4568 V-8 4WD was introduced in 1975. In 1976, the entire tractor line got a new paint scheme and decal pattern; instead of the side panels being all white with chrome and black decals, they were now all red with a black-striped sticker. This was done to clear inventory for the forthcoming Pro Ag Line.

In September 1976, IH released their 86 series Pro Ag Line. The models included the 80 hp (60 kW) 786, the 90 hp (67 kW) 886, the 101 hp (75 kW) 986, the 104 hp (78 kW) 186 Hydro, the 135 hp (101 kW) 1086, the 146 hp (109 kW) 1486 and the 161 hp (120 kW) 1586. These tractors had a new cab dubbed the Control Center that came standard with air conditioning, heat, and several radio-CB options. The driver sat well ahead of the rear axle, and the fuel tank was mounted behind the cab over the rear axle. This improved balance and ride. Also in 1976, the 62 hp (46 kW) 686 along with the "86" series four-wheel-drives were introduced, including the 4186, 4386, 4586, and 4786.

In 1977, International Harvester introduced the first Axial-Flow rotary combine. This machine, produced at East Moline, Illinois, was the first generation of over 30 years of Axial-Flow combines.

In 1979 IH introduced two tractors, the 3388 and 3588, known as the 2+2 4WD line. These were built by taking two 1086 rear ends and hooking them together with a transfer case. A year later, the 3788 was introduced. Although these tractors performed well in the field, they never sold well.

==== 1980s ====
As the 1980s began, IH faced a stable economy, yet an unknown fate. In September 1981, IH announced at a dealership meeting the new "50 Series" of tractors, which included the 136 hp (101 kW) 5088, the 162 hp (121 kW) 5288 and the 187 hp (139 kW) 5488. IH also released the "30 series", which included the 81 hp (60 kW) 3088, the 90 hp (67 kW) 3288, the 112 hp (84 kW) 3488 Hydro, and the 113 hp (84 kW) 3688. These new tractors proved once again that IH was innovative. Designed and styled by IH industrial designer Gregg Montgomery (Montgomery Design International), the new stylish design of the 50 and 30 series changed the look of tractors from that time forward. IH spent over $29 million to develop this new series.

Many technology-related innovations appeared in the new series. IH became the first manufacturer to add a computer monitoring system (Sentry) to a farm tractor. Other innovations included a "Z" shift pattern, 18-speed synchronized transmission, forward air-flow cooling system that sucked air from above the hood and blew it out the front grille, "Power Priority" three-pump hydraulic system, color-coded hydraulic lines and controls, and a new rear-hitch system. The 50 Series had an unprecedented three-year or 2,500-hour engine and drive-train warranty, which later became an industry standard. Although no new sales records were set, IH sold a respectable number of these tractors during their short production time. IH also released the "60 series 2+2s" and planned on making the "Super 70 series" 2+2s, but only a handful of these exist today. On May 14, 1985, the last IH tractor rolled off the factory line, a 5488 FWA.

In the late 1970s, IH entered a deal with Spain's Enasa to build diesel engines there as Internacional de Motores. After a downturn in the market coupled to problems with Spain's entry into the European Economic Community threatened the profitability of this project, International Harvester withdrew in 1982. In return for being allowed to escape all conditions of the joint venture, IH lost their up-front investment in the engine plant and ended up selling British truck manufacturer Seddon Atkinson (which had belonged to IH since 1974) to Enasa in 1983.

==== Brand names of the agriculture division ====
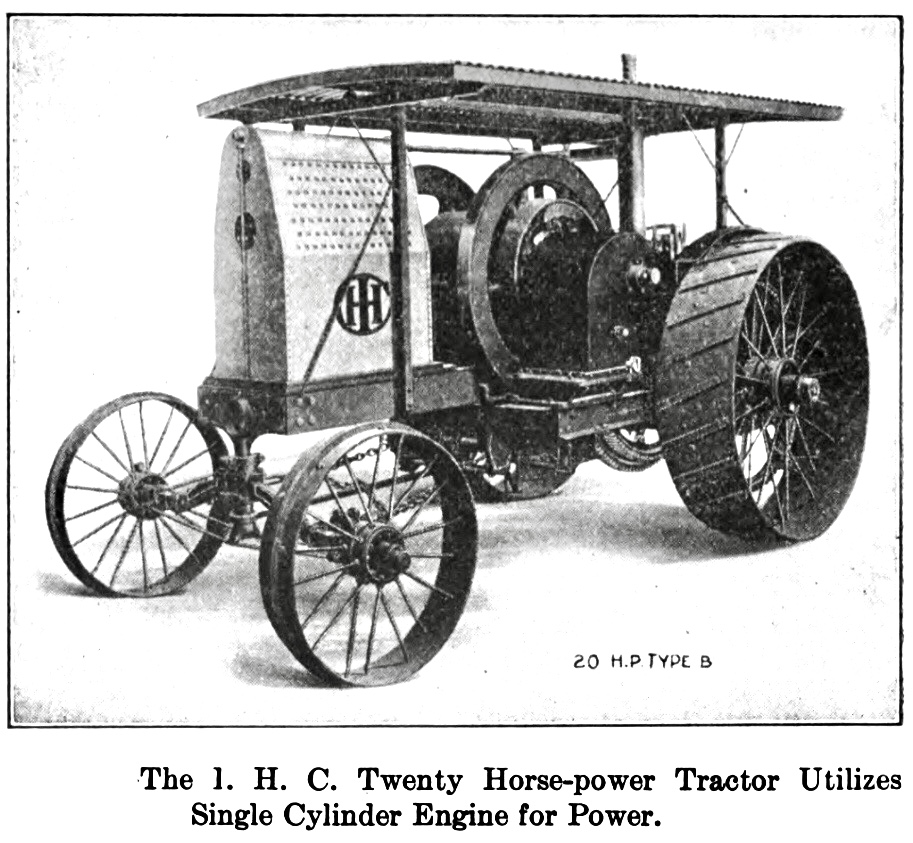
I.H.C. Model B (1910-1917) 20 hp

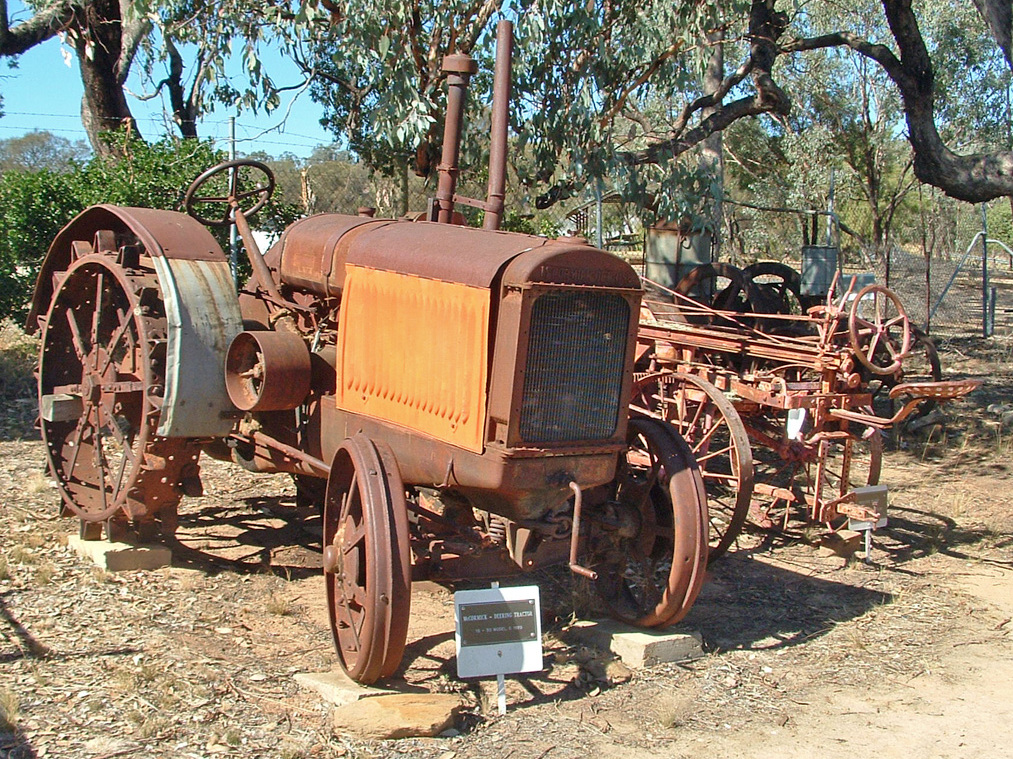
McCormick Deering tractor

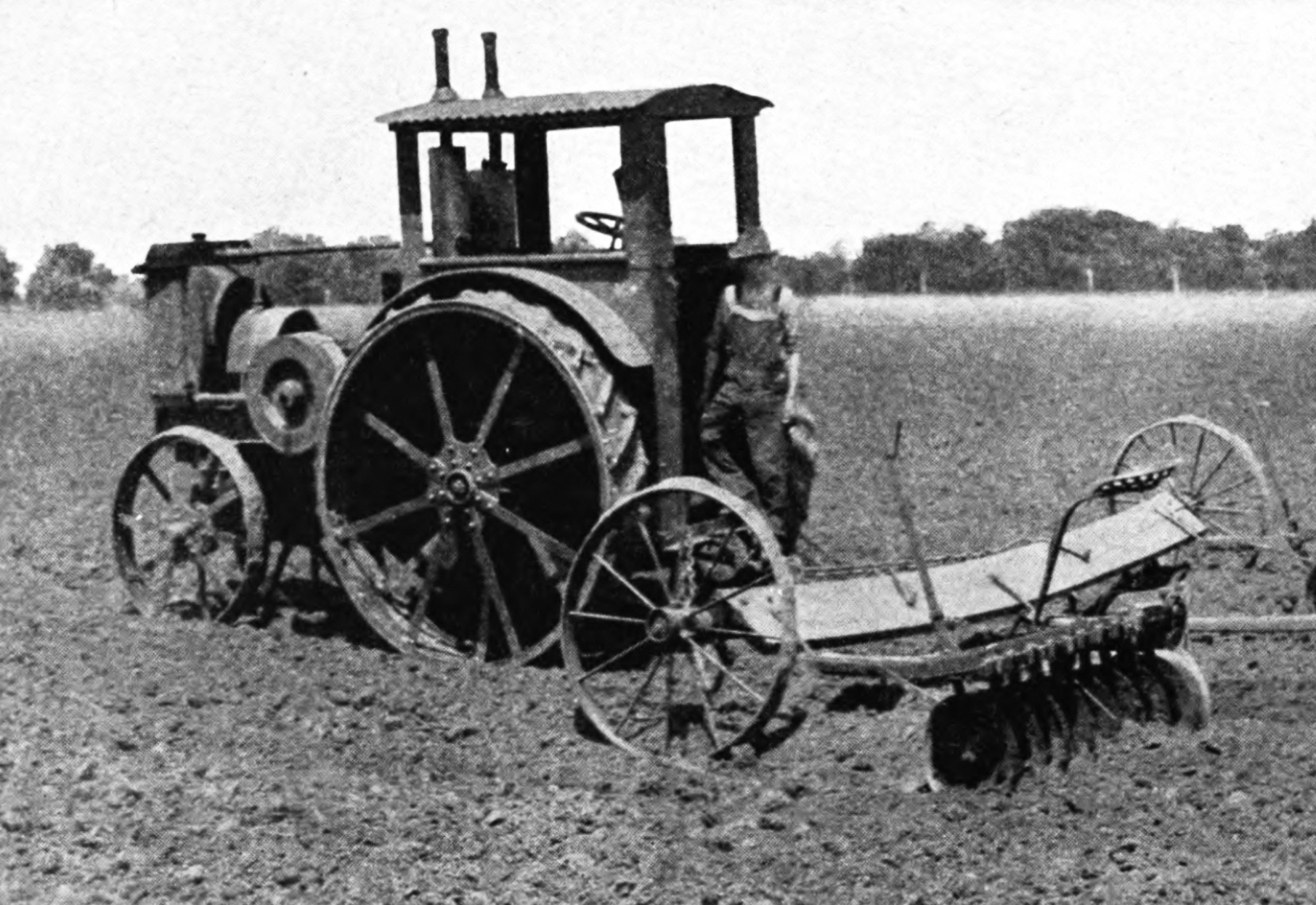
Titan 15/30 HP.

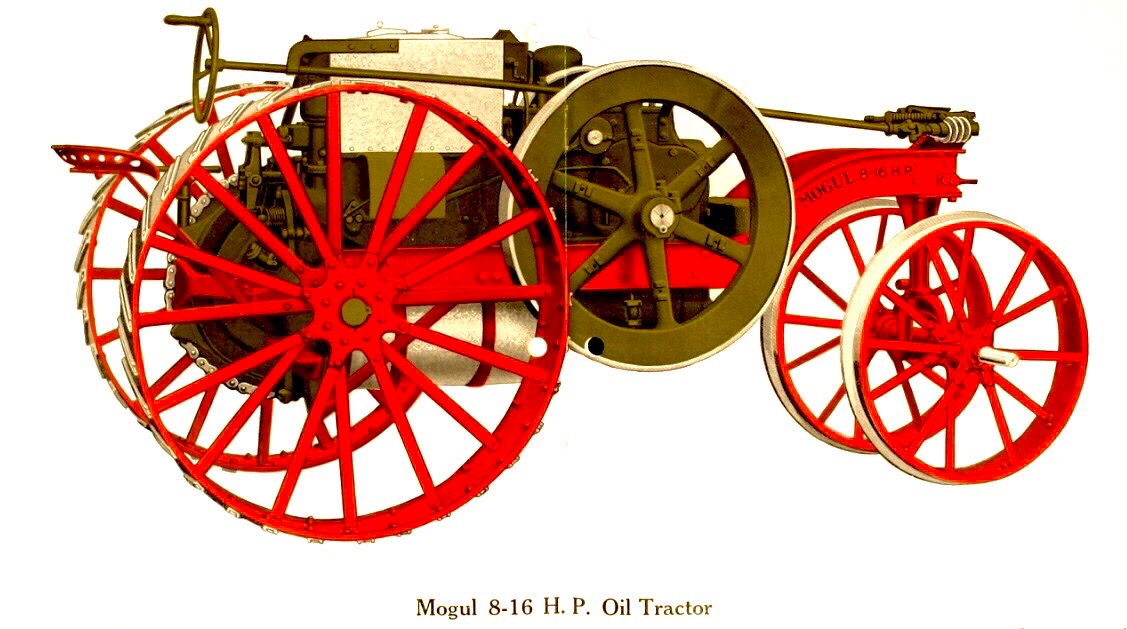
Mogul 8-16 (1915-1917)

IH over the years used a number of brand names to market their tractor and harvesting products:

- International (1902–1985)
- Titan (1910–1924)
- Mogul (1911–1924)
- McCormick–Deering (1922–1947)
- McCormick (1947–1958)
- Farmall (1924–1973)
- Fairway (1924–1938)
- Electrall (1954–1956)
- Cub (1947–1985)
Titan Tractors
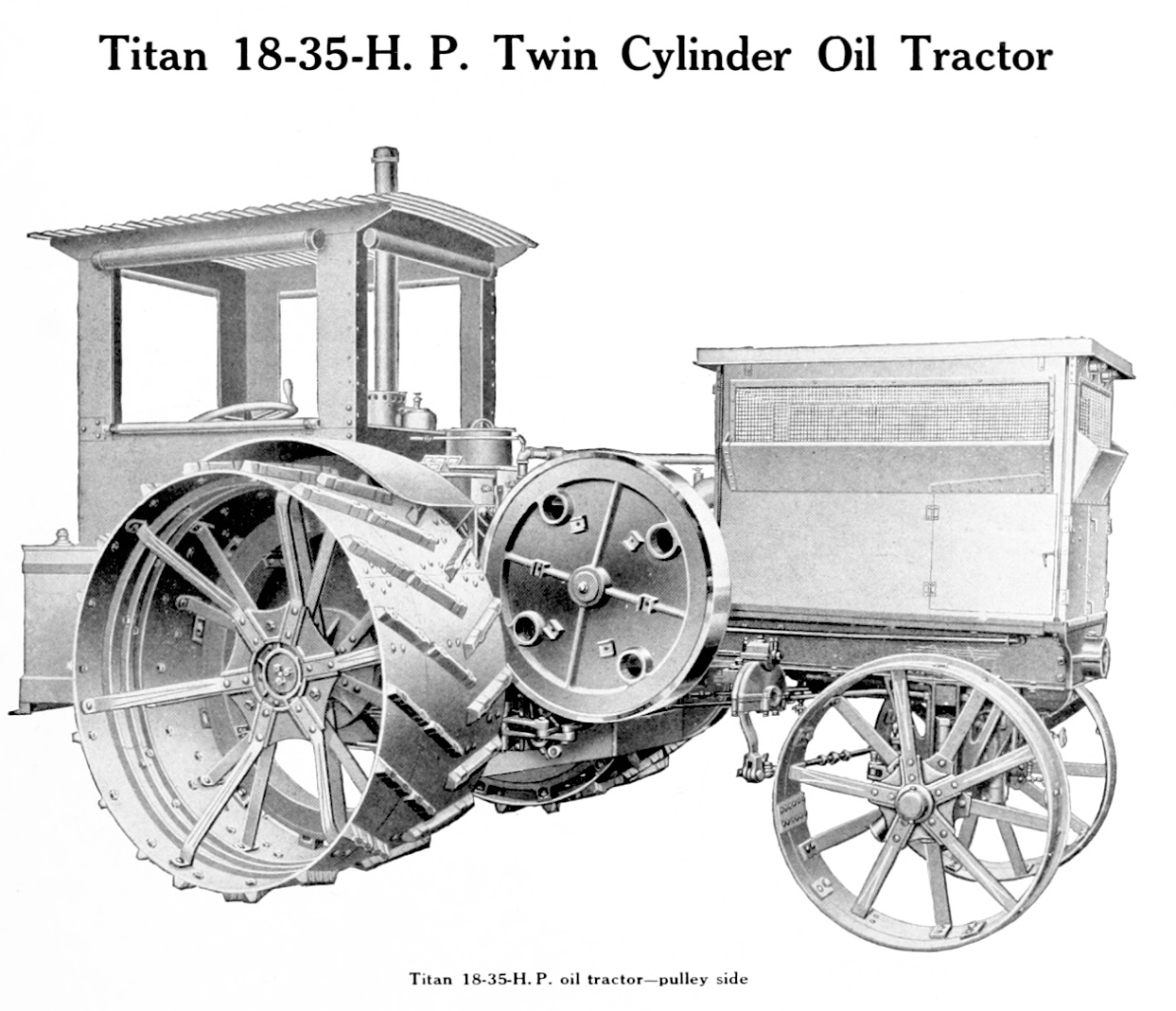
two cylinder,16474 cc, 18-35 hp

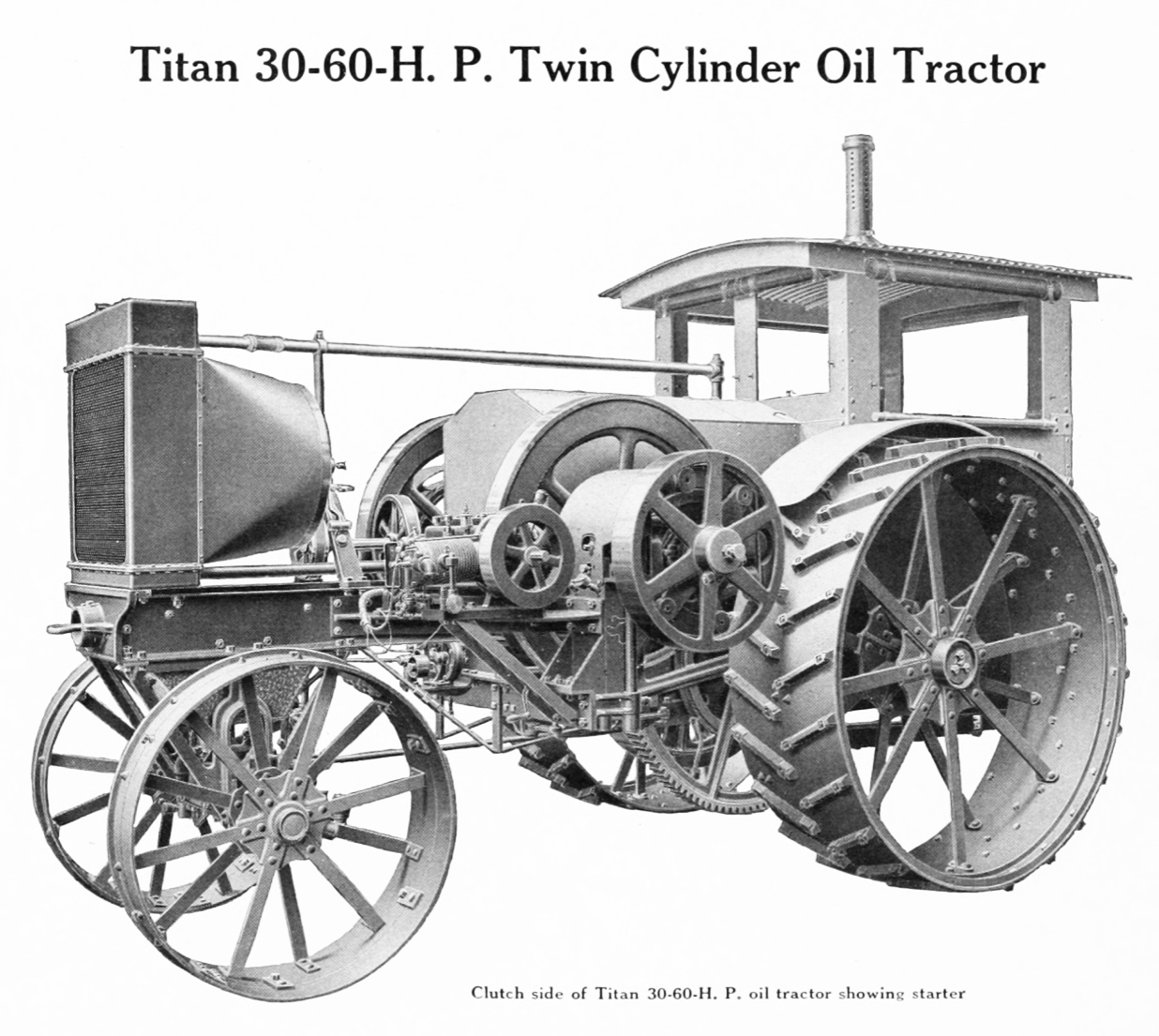
two cylinder,29190 cc, 30-60 hp

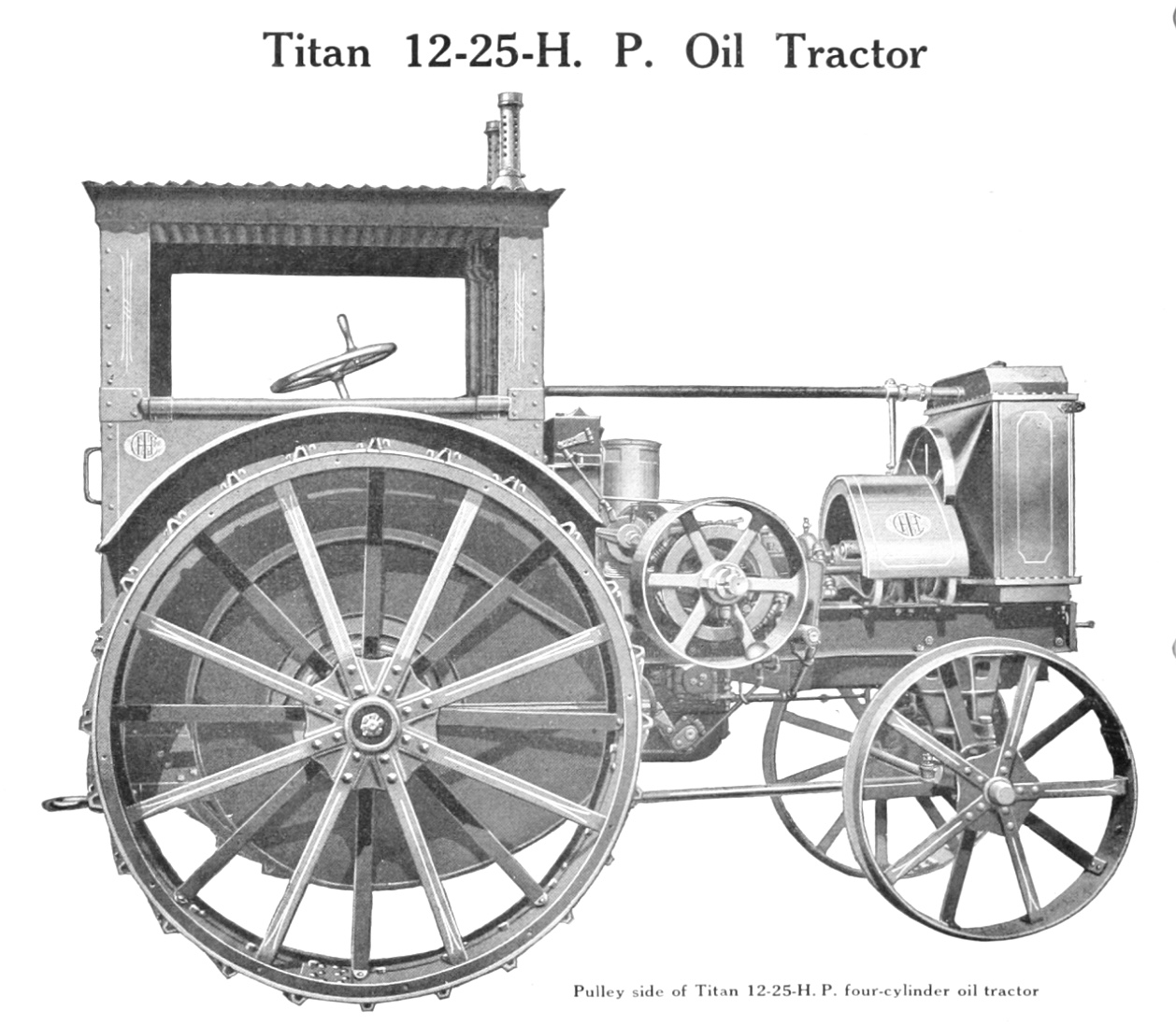
four cylinder,11377 cc, 12-25 hp
Mogul Tractors
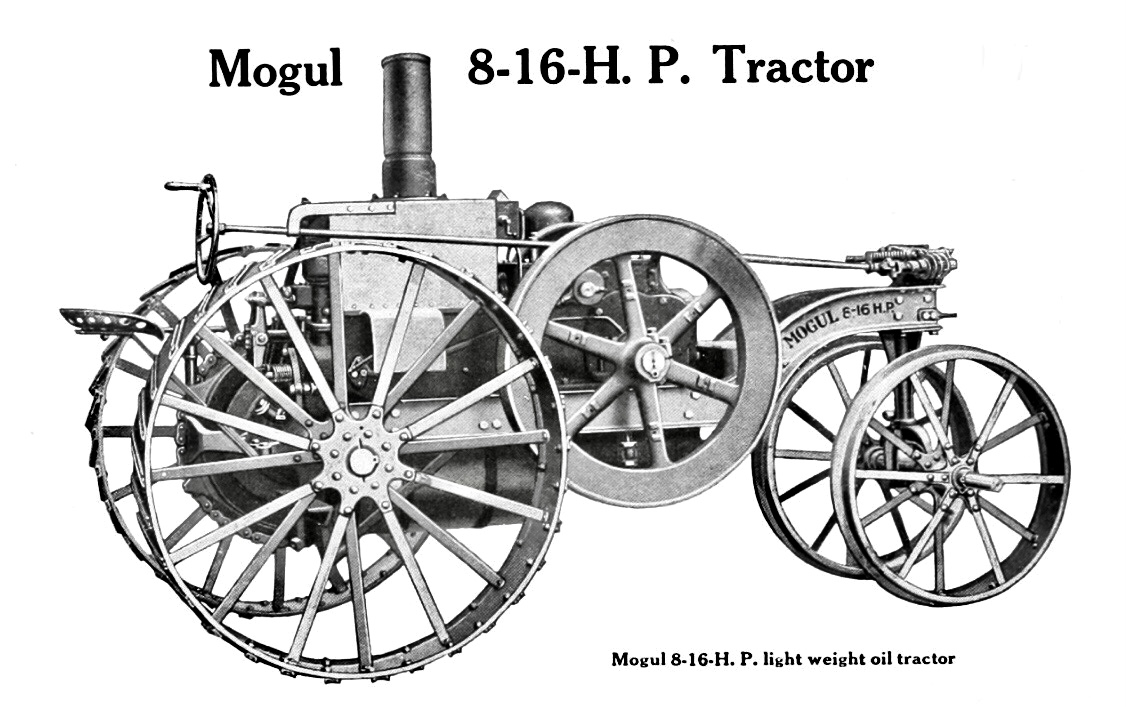
one cylinder,9884 cc, 8-16 hp

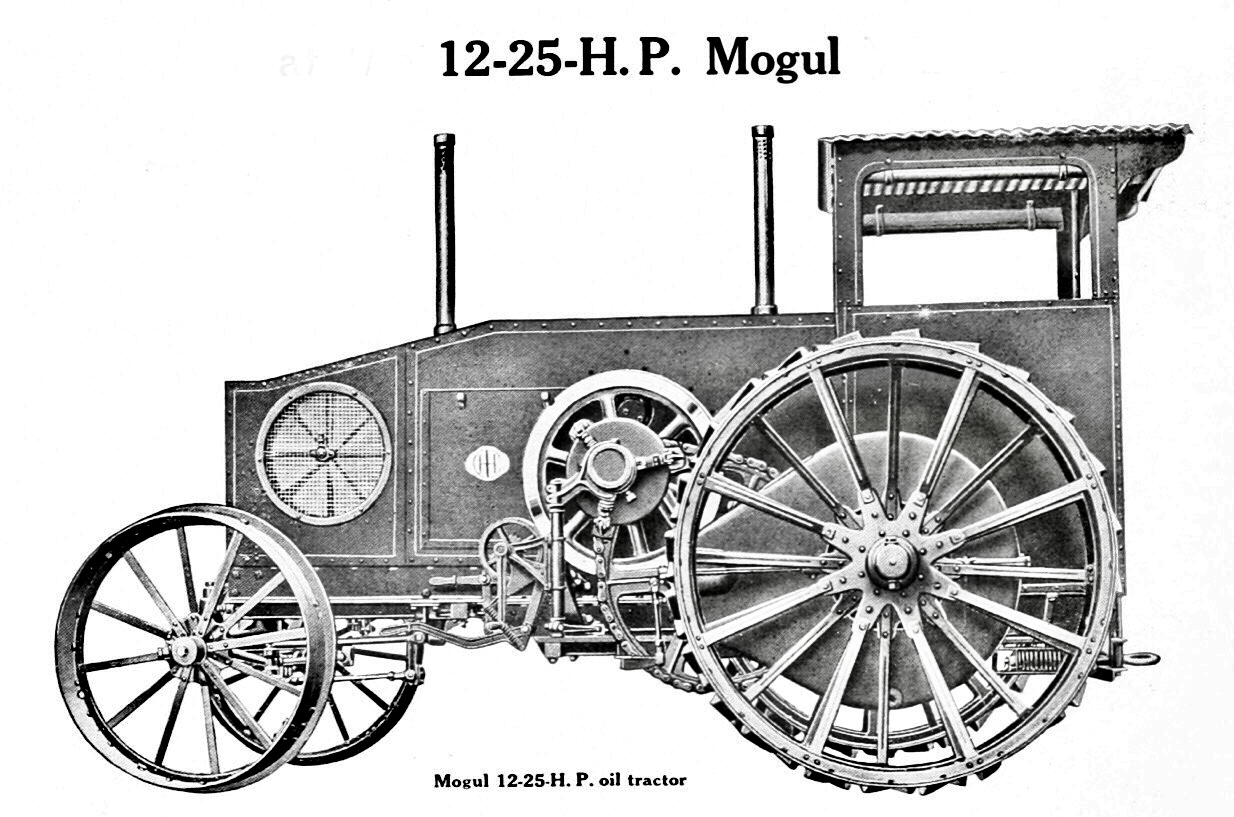
two cylinder,10090 cc, 12-25 hp

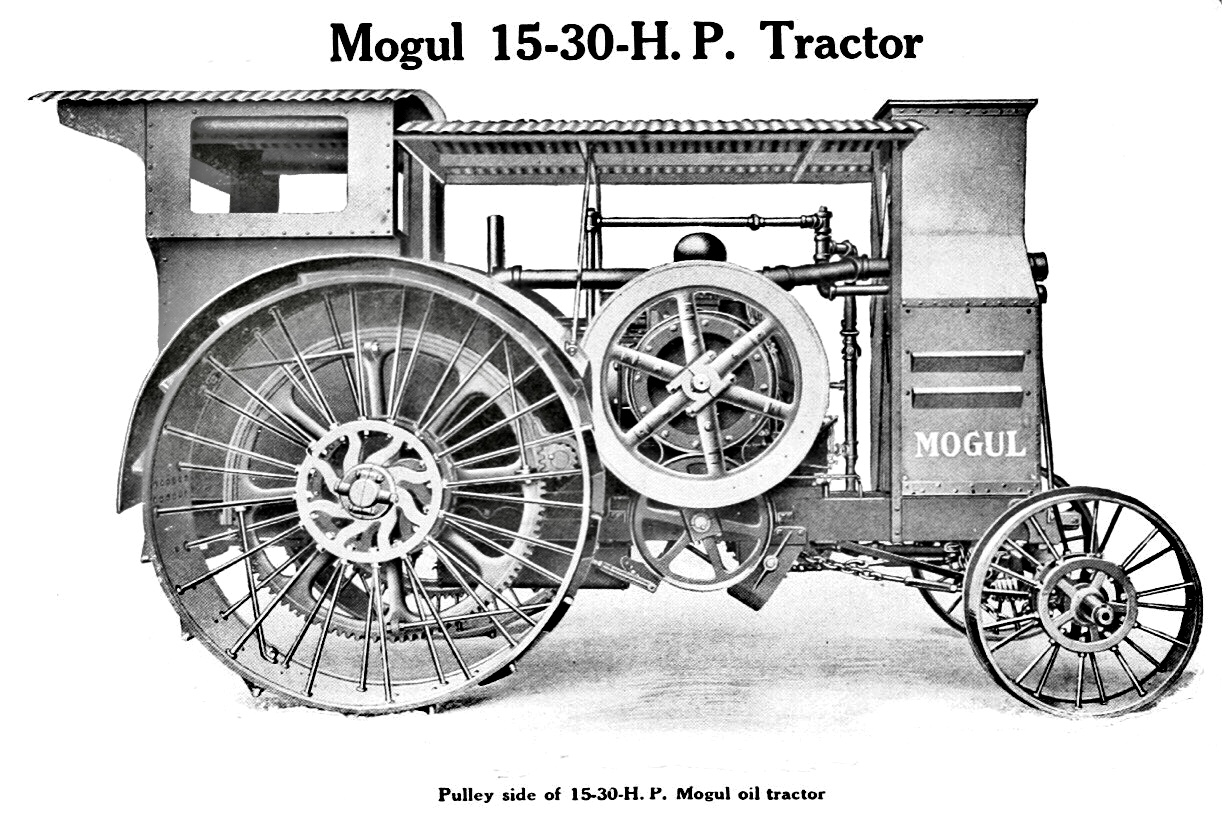
one cylinder,13939 cc, 15-30 hp

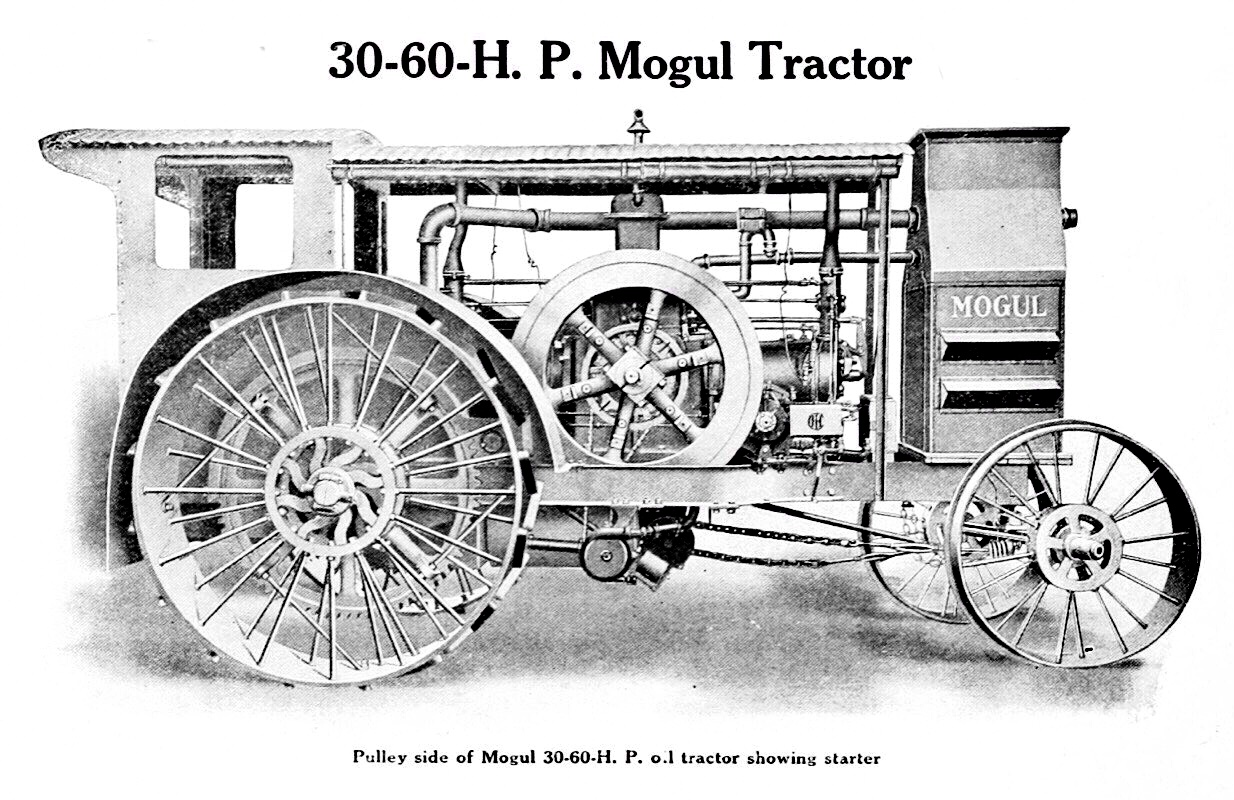
two cylinder,30889 cc, 30-60 hp

== Overview production figures International Harvester tractors ==
Model	Serial letter	Plant	1906	1907	1908	1909	1910
IHC 10,12,15,20 hp	T	upper Sandusky	14	153	208	1	0
	T	Akron	0	0	321	114	11
	T	Milwaukee	0	0	100	136	0
Sum	T		14	153	629	251	11

Model	Serial letter	Plant	1907	1908	1909	1910	1911
IHC 12,15,20 hp Typ A	T	upper Sandusky	1	36	99	54	58
	T	Akron	0	0	301	43	15
Sum	T		1	36	400	97	73

Model	Serial letter	Plant	1909	1910	1911	1912
IHC 12 Typ A two speed	T	upper Sandusky	3	21	34	7

Model	Serial letter	Plant	1908	1909	1910	1911	1912
IHC 20 hp Typ B	T	upper Sandusky	3	107	104	39	2
	T	Akron	0	0	46	0	0
Sum	T		3	107	150	39	2

Model	Serial letter	Plant	1909	1910	1911	1912	1913	1914
IHC Mogul 20 hp Typ C (10-20)	TL	Milwaukee	120	1,787	395	87	27	25

Model	Serial letter	Plant	1910	1911	1912	1913	1914	1915	1916
IHC 12, 15 hp Type A Forward Reverse	TL	upper Sandusky	2	2	126	37	32	3	1

Model	Serial letter	Plant	1910	1911	1912	1913	1914	1915	1916	1917
IHC 20 hp Type B Forward Reverse	TL	upper Sandusky	1	8	145	125	46	31	22	5

Model	Serial letter	Plant	1910	1911	1912	1913	1914
IHC Titan 20 hp Type D	TD	Milwaukee	17	91	130	28	8

Model	Serial letter	Plant	1910	1911	1912	1913	1914
IHC Titan 25 hp Type D	TM	Milwaukee	52	1,007	542	74	82

Model	Serial letter	Plant	1910	1911	1912	1913	1914	1915
IHC Titan 45 hp Type D (27-45) (30-60)	TN, TH, TJ, TA, TR, TK, TG, TT	Milwaukee	4	186	728	17	381	3

Model	Serial letter	Plant	1911	1912	1913	1914
IHC Mogul 25 hp Type C	TP	Milwaukee	453	271	53	85

Model	Serial letter	Plant	1911	1912	1913	1914	1915	1916	1917
IHC Mogul 45 hp (30-60)	X, U	(Tractor)	583	1,052	698	21	77	5	1

Model	Serial letter	Plant	1911	1912	1913
IHC Mogul Junior 25 hp	J	(Tractor)	47	683	82

Model	Serial letter	Plant	1912	1913
IHC Mogul 10-20	B	(Tractor)	9	76

Model	Serial letter	Plant	1912	1913	1914
IHC Titan 20 hp Road Roller (10-20)	TE	Milwaukee	17	13	9

Model	Serial letter	Plant	1912	1913	1914
IHC Titan 25 hp Road Roller (12-25)	TO	Milwaukee	29	15	7

Model	Serial letter	Plant	1912	1913	1914	1915
IHC Titan 18-35 hp Type D	TC, TB, TF	Milwaukee	2	120	89	48
IHC Titan 30hp Type D		Milwaukee	1	0	0	0

Model	Serial letter	Plant	1913	1914	1915
IHC Mogul 15-30 hp	C	(Tractor)	436	41	50

Model	Serial letter	Plant	1913	1914	1915	1916	1917	1918
IHC Mogul 12-25 hp	F	(Tractor)	117	234	274	401	522	1

Model	Serial letter	Plant	1914	1915	1916	1917
IHC Mogul 8-16 hp	SB	(Tractor)	20	5,111	8,269	665

Model	Serial letter	Plant	1914	1915	1916	1917
IHC Titan 12-25 hp (15-30)	TS	Milwaukee	13	196	511	60

Model	Serial letter	Plant	1914	1915
IHC Mogul 20-40 hp		(Tractor)	2	8

Model	Serial letter	Plant	1915	1916	1917
IHC Titan 30-60 hp New	TU	Milwaukee	33	91	52

Model	Serial letter	Plant	1915	1916	1917	1918	1919	1920	1921	1922
IHC Titan 10-20 hp two cylinder	TV, TY	Milwaukee	7	2,246	9,044	17,675	17,234	21,503	7,729	2,925

Model	Serial letter	Plant	1916	1917	1918	1919
IHC Mogul 10-20 hp two speed	BC	(Tractor)	25	5,338	3,146	476

Model	Serial letter	Plant	1917	1918	1919	1920	1921	1922
IHC Mogul 8-16 hp four cylinder	VB, HC, IC	(Tractor)	38	3,162	7,571	5,848	9,013	7,506

Model	Serial letter	Plant	1917	1918	1919	1920	1921
IHC Titan 15-30 hp	TW	Milwaukee	376	420	0	0	0
	TW	(Tractor)	0	865	1,652	1,068	821
Sum	TW		376	1,285	1,652	1,068	821

Model	Serial letter	Plant	1921	1922	1923	1924	1925	1926	1927	1928	1929	1930	1931	1932
McCormick–Deering 15-30 hp	TG	Milwaukee	199	1,350	4,886	7,321	12,978	20,001	17,554	35,525	28,311	21,891	4,380	1,705

Model	Serial letter	Plant	1923	1924	1925	1926	1927	1928	1929	1930	1931	1932
McCormick–Deering 10-20 hp	KC	Milwaukee	7,117	11,197	18,436	25,021	26,646	30,353	39,433	32,230	10,901	1,852

=== Other agricultural products ===
Along with its prominent tractor division, IH also sold several different types of farm-related equipment, such as balers, cultivators, combines (self-propelled and pull behind), stationary engines, wagons, combine heads, corn shellers, corn planter, cotton pickers, manure spreaders, hay rakes, crop dusters, disk harrows, elevators, feed grinders, hammer mills, hay conditioners, milking machines, planters, mills, discs, plows, baler twine, and other miscellaneous equipment.

=== Earthmoving division ===
IH built up its earthmoving division over time, buying companies and acquiring technology. Its heavy tractor range was an established offering, however IH wanted to offer innovative new construction technology. Significant moves included the purchase of the Frank G Hough company, which produced an iconic machine called a PayLoader, and the purchase of French company Yumbo, which produced hydraulic excavators.

Between 1956 and 1982 IH developed and sold a range of off-road dump trucks, which were known commercially as 'PayHaulers'.

International manufactured and sold an extensive range of heavy equipment. In 1974 IH renamed this division the 'Payline' division.

==== Payloaders ====
The original payloader model was literally a tractor with forks welded to the front. Frank Hough invented the concept and Hough's company worked closely with IH until it was purchased in 1952. The terminology came to mean any type of front loader machine, and loaders were manufactured in a number of styles, including wheeled and track loaders, rear wheel loaders, and an articulated steering design.

==== PayScrapers ====
In the early 1950s, contractors worldwide began using motor scrapers as a means of shifting dirt. IH had a hole in its product range; it did not offer a motor scraper product to the market. One of IH's suppliers, a company named Heil Earthmovers, manufactured a range of scrapers called 'Heiliners.'

Rather than spend money on R&D and enter the market at a later date, in 1953 IH bought Heil's road machinery division, incorporating a range of motor and towed scrapers.

==== Attachments: blades, buckets, rippers and compaction equipment ====
IH International had a supply agreement for its heavy tractor attachments with a company called Bucyrus-Erie. Among a variety of attachment solutions, Bucyrus-Erie made a range of cable and hydraulically operated blades that fit International-Harvester track type tractors.

IH purchased the blades range from Bucyrus-Erie in the 1950s and absorbed these into its machinery division.

IH also purchased attachments for the tractor range from Isaacson, including logging arches and dozer blades. Carrying on with its expansion IH purchased Isaacson's attachments division in 1952.

==== Electrall ====
The Electrall system was introduced in 1954; it was a short-lived attempt to market electrically operated farm equipment and accessories. The system, co-developed with General Electric, consisted of a 208 V three-phase alternating-current generator connected with electric cables to the device to be powered. The generator could even power a household. A 10 kW Electrall generator was an option on the Farmall 400 tractor, and a 12.5 kW PTO-driven version was made. The possible applications of Electrall power were many, but few made it to market. IH marketing materials showed a haybaler being Electrall powered. One of the more novel applications of the Electrall was a device to electrocute insects in the field at night (basically like a modern-day bug zapper, but on a larger scale).

== Road vehicles ==
=== Light duty trucks ===
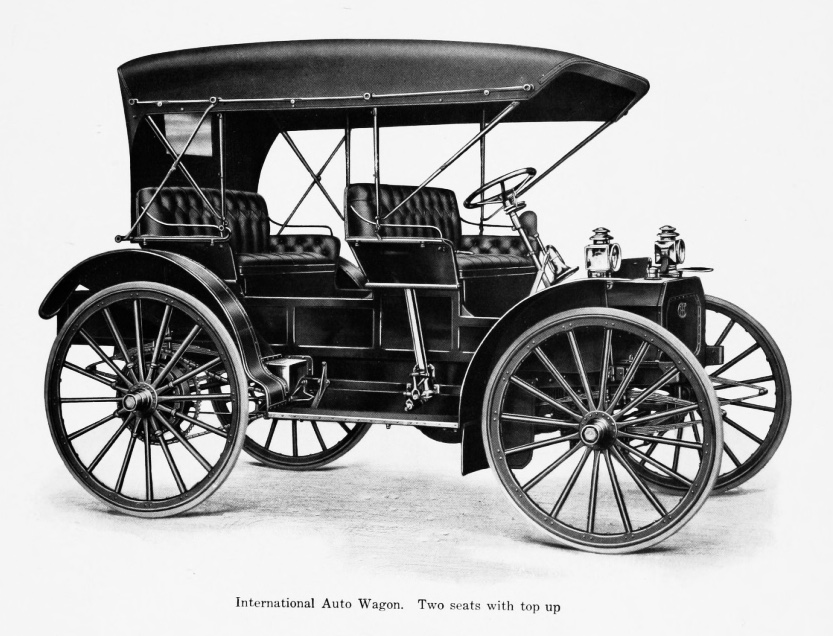
International Auto Buggy with top up (1907).

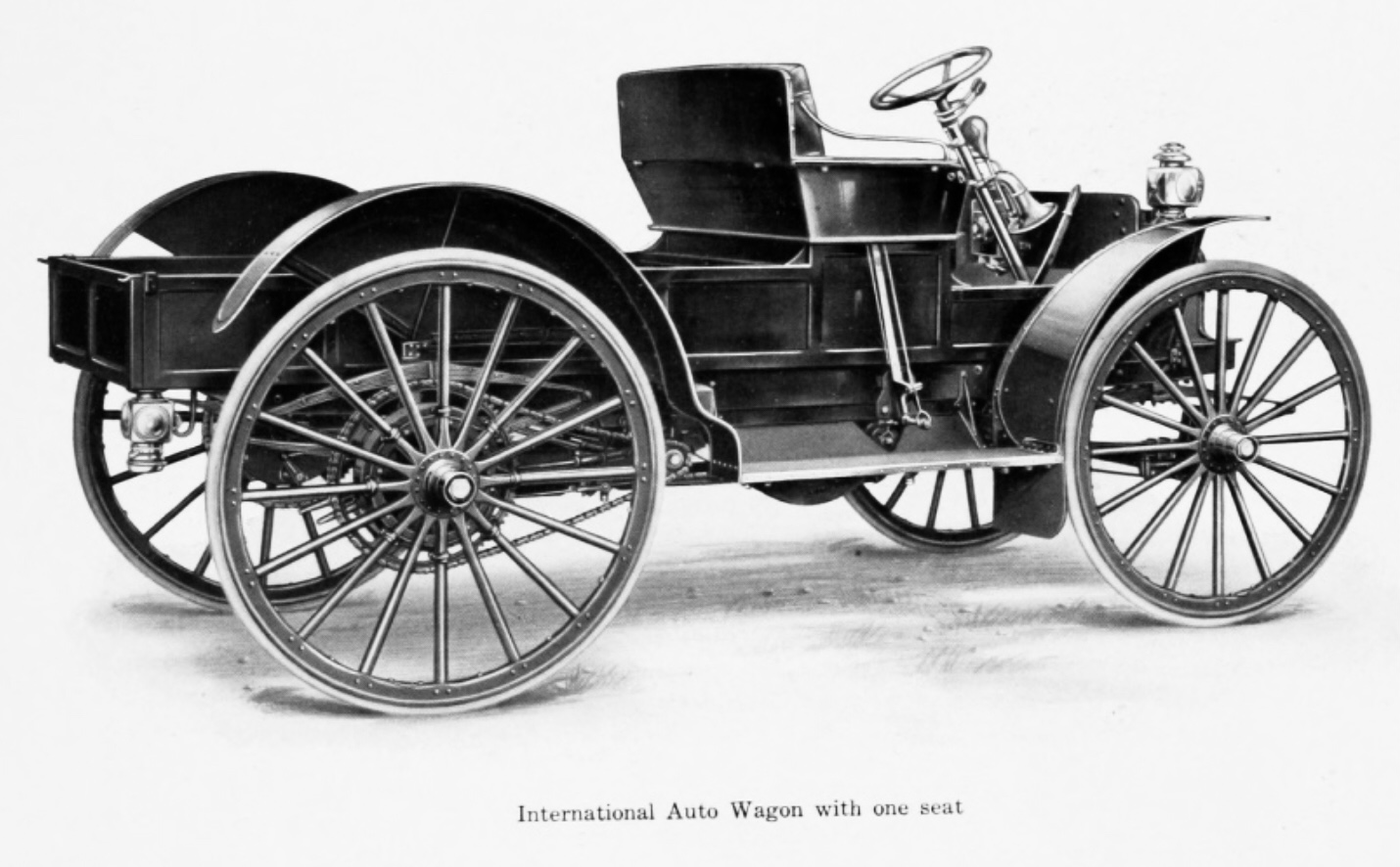
International light duty truck (1907)

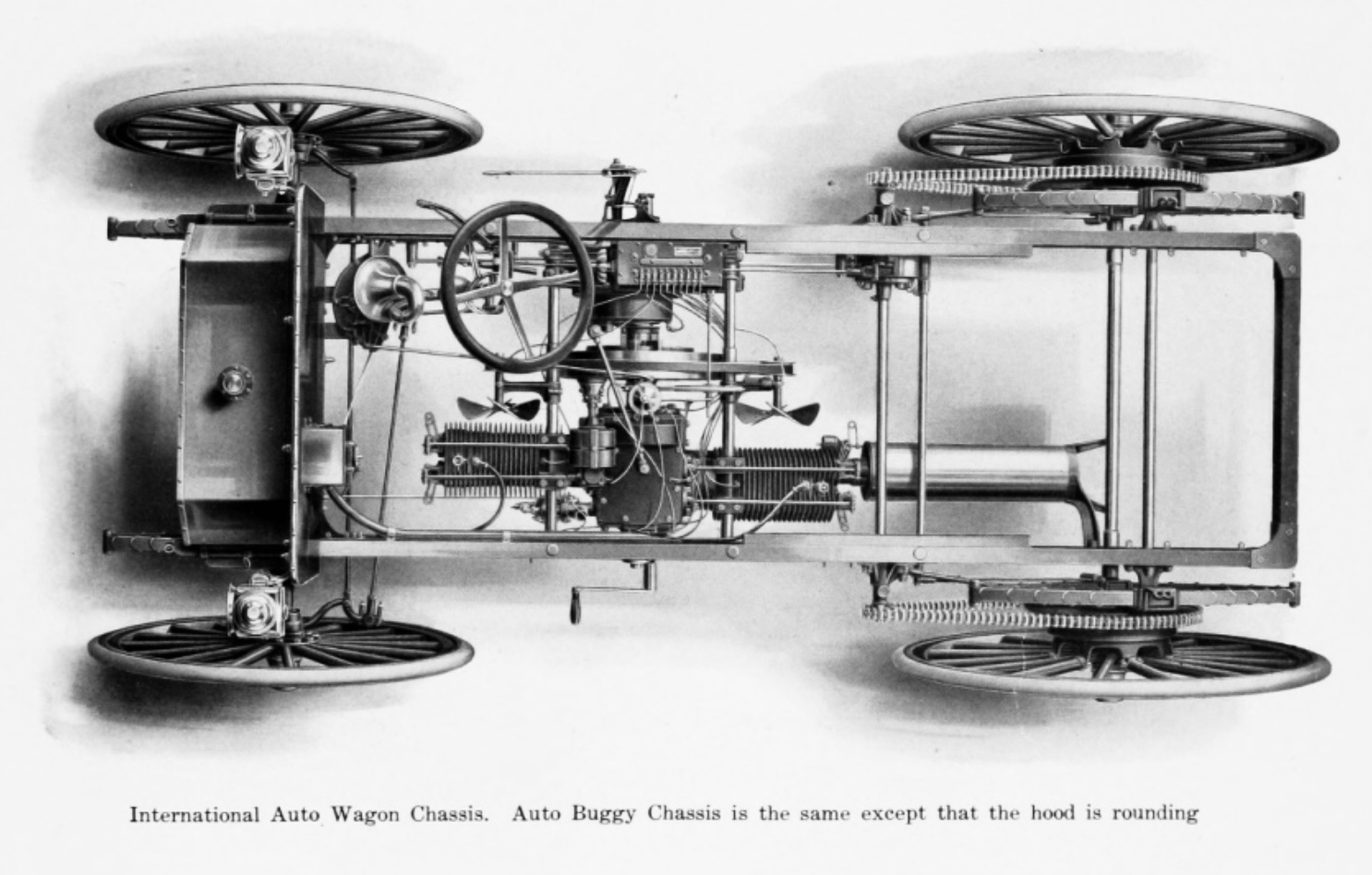
International Auto Buggy Chassis (1907).

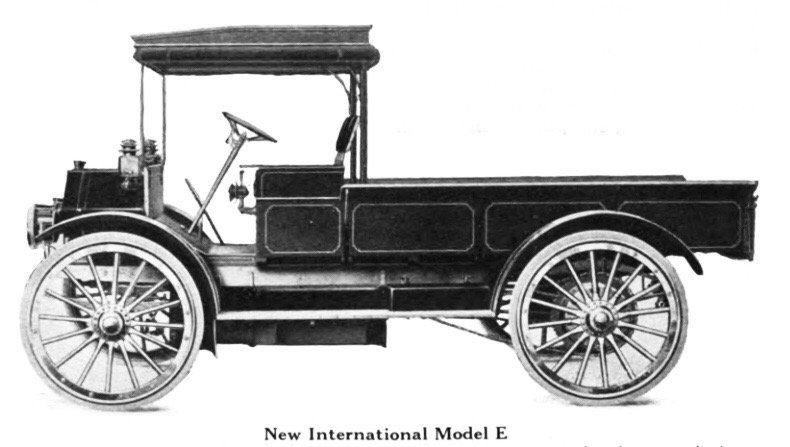
International Model E (1915-1916)

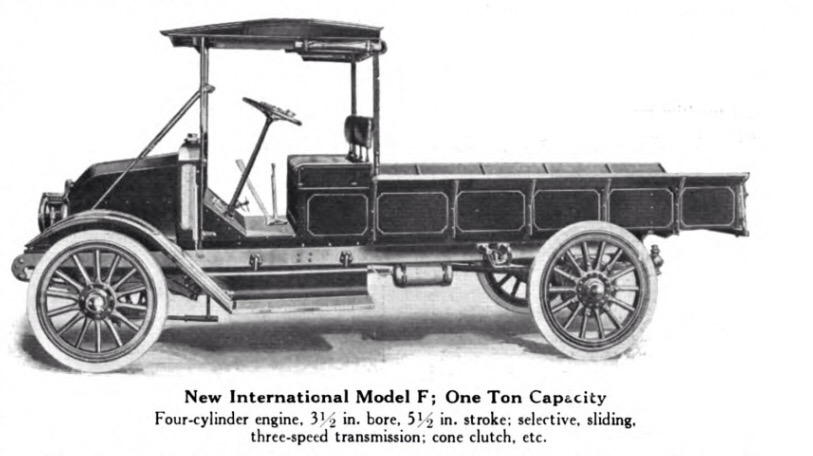
International Model F (1915-1921)

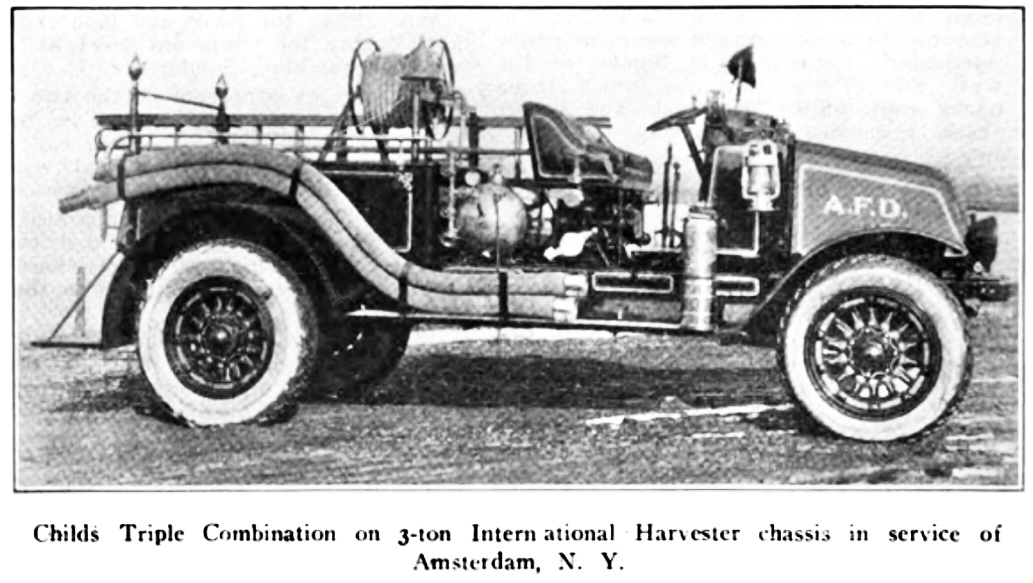
International Harvester 3 t Firetruck (1922)

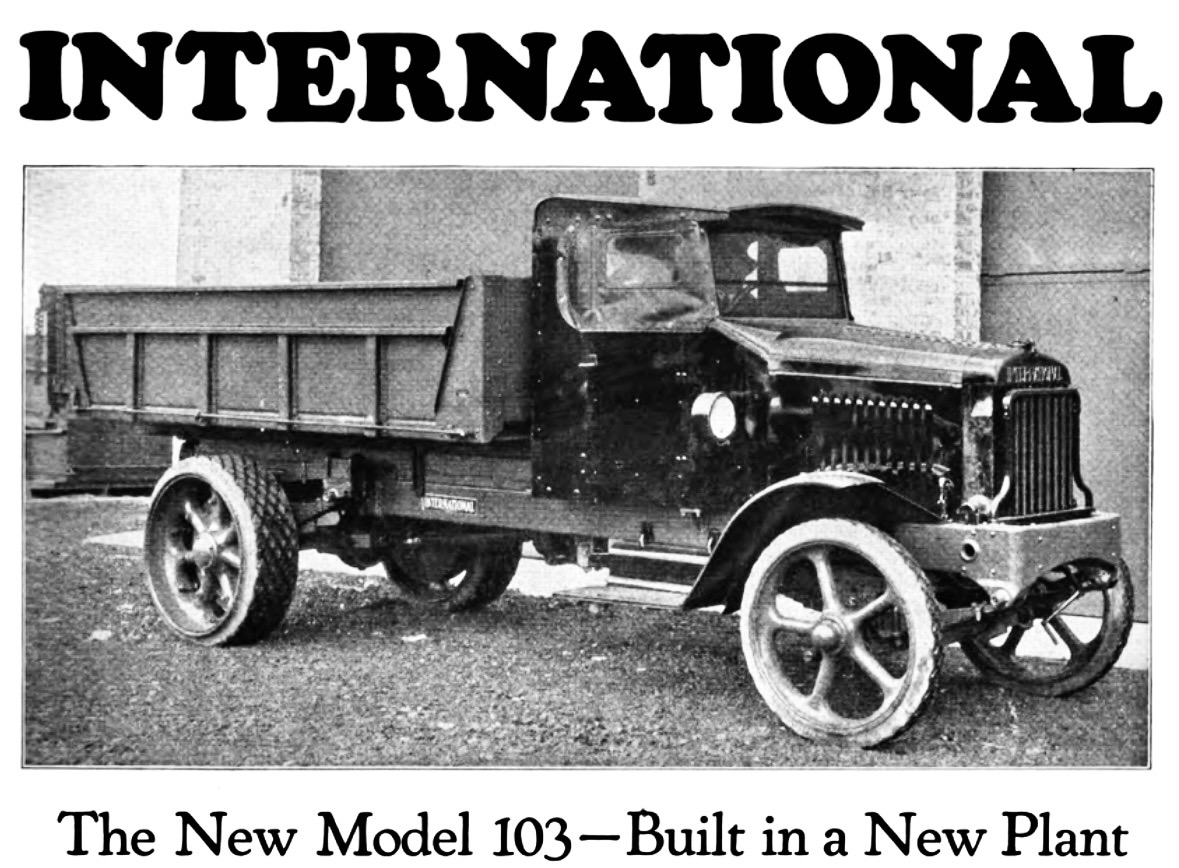
International Model 103 (1924-1927)

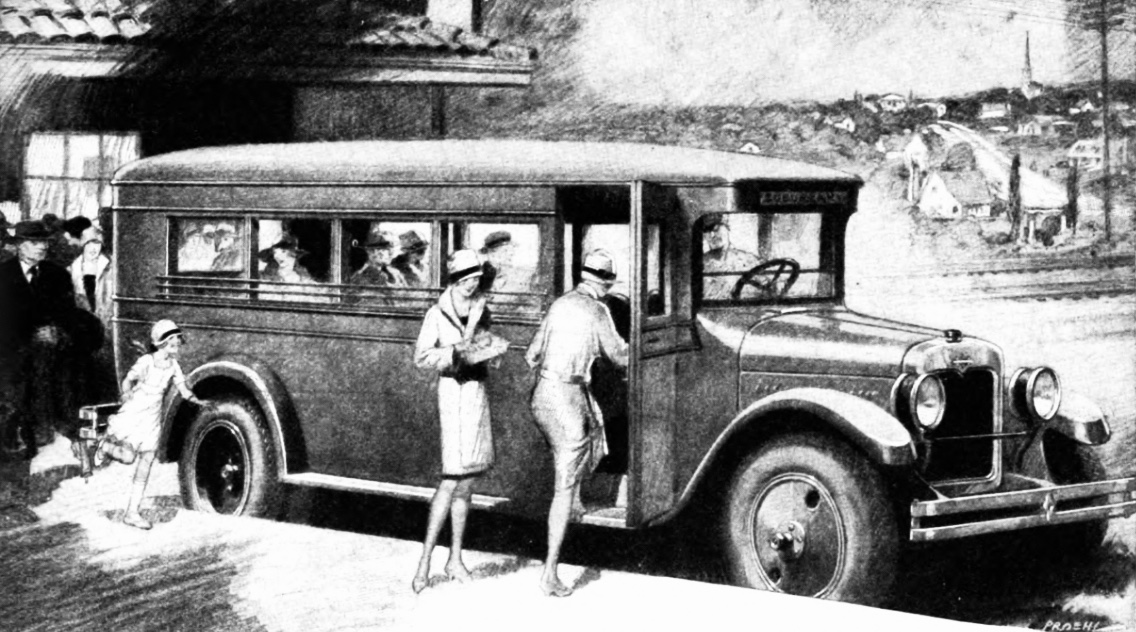
International Harvester Model 15 (1927-1928)

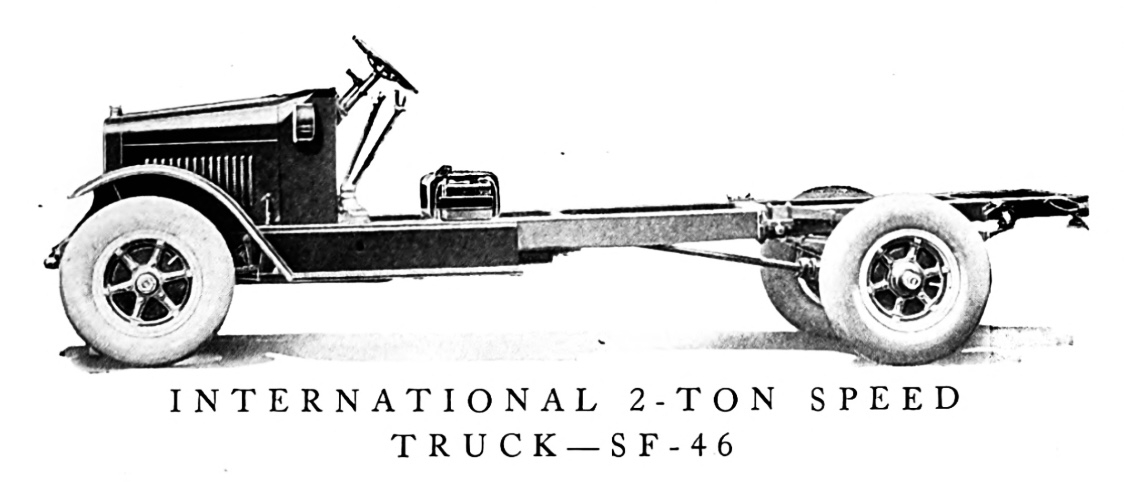
International Harvester SF 46 (1927–1930)

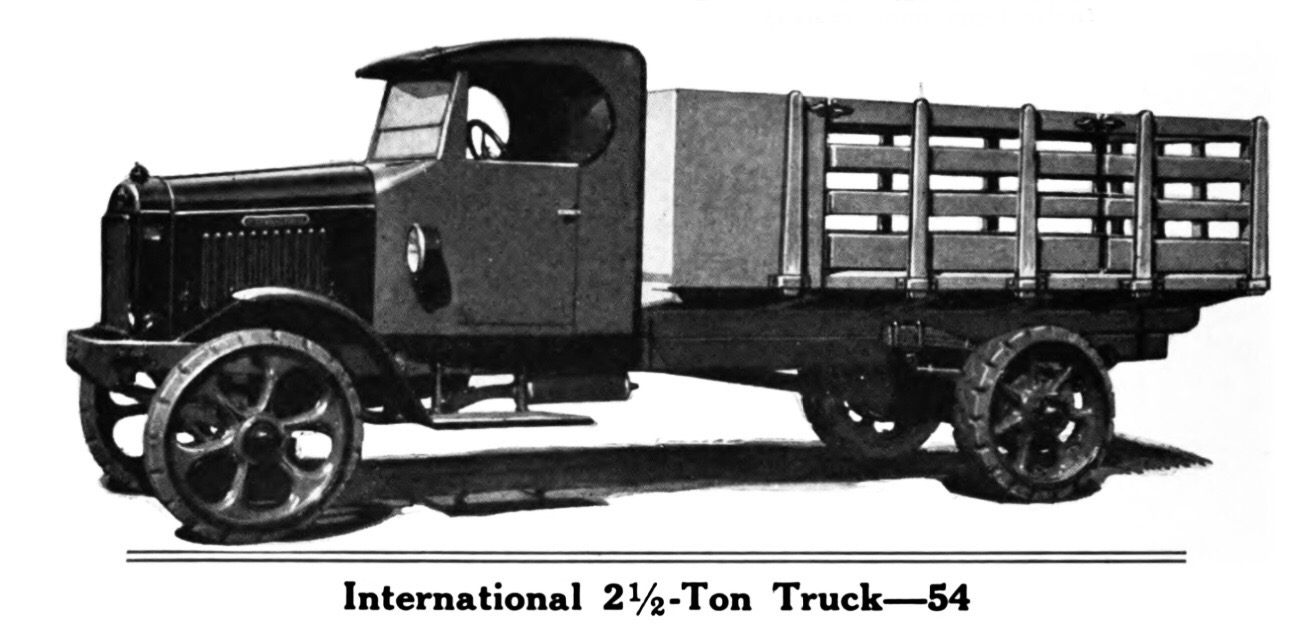
International Harvester 54 (1927–1928)

IH is often remembered as a maker of relatively successful and innovative "light" lines of vehicles, competing directly against the Big Three. The most common were pickup trucks. IH made light trucks from 1907 to 1975, beginning with the Model A Auto Wagon (sometimes called the "Auto Buggy"). Production commenced in February 1907 at IH's McCormick Works in Chicago, although production was moved to Akron, Ohio, in October that year. Powered by a horizontally opposed, air-cooled twin around 15 hp (11 kW), it was a right-hand-drive model popular in rural areas for high ground clearance on the poor roads typical of the era. The displacement was 3,217 cc with a bore of 127 mm and a stroke of 127 mm. The wheelbase was 90 inches = 2286 mm. The front wheels had a size of 1.75 x 41 inches = 44.5 x 1041 mm. The rear wheels had a size of 1.75 x 45 inches = 44.5 x 1143 mm. The tank capacity was 7 gallons = 26 liters, sufficient for 75 to 100 miles = 120 to 160 kilometers. It featured a rear seat convertible to a carrier bed. The Auto Wagon was renamed the Motor Truck in 1910, and was a forerunner to the successful modern pickup truck. They were called IHC until 1914, when the 'International' name was first applied. The final light line truck was made on May 5, 1975.

Following the early success with the Auto Buggy, International released their K and KB series trucks in the mid-1940s. They were simpler and sturdier than other trucks released in that era. This was followed by the L series in 1949, which was replaced by the R series in 1952, followed by the S series (a name re-used later for IH's larger medium-duty trucks) in 1955. In 1957, to celebrate IH's golden anniversary as a truck manufacturer, this was replaced by the new A line. 'A' stands for anniversary. With light modifications to its appearance, but more serious changes under the shell (and a number of new names), this design continued in production until replaced by the 1100D in late 1969, which looked very similar to the Scout already in production.

Corresponding with the truck "letter lines" was the Metro line of step (delivery) vans. Starting in 1938 and manufactured through 1975, the Metro series was produced and updated with each iteration of IH's truck lines. Also, special-use variants were sold, such as the Metro Coach (a bus version with windows and passenger seats) and Metro front-end section and chassis for full commercial customization. Additional variants were based on the medium-duty engine and chassis lines.

IH abandoned sales of passenger vehicles in 1980 to concentrate on commercial trucks and school buses.

The Scout and Light Truck parts business was sold to Scout/Light Line Distributors, Inc. in 1991.

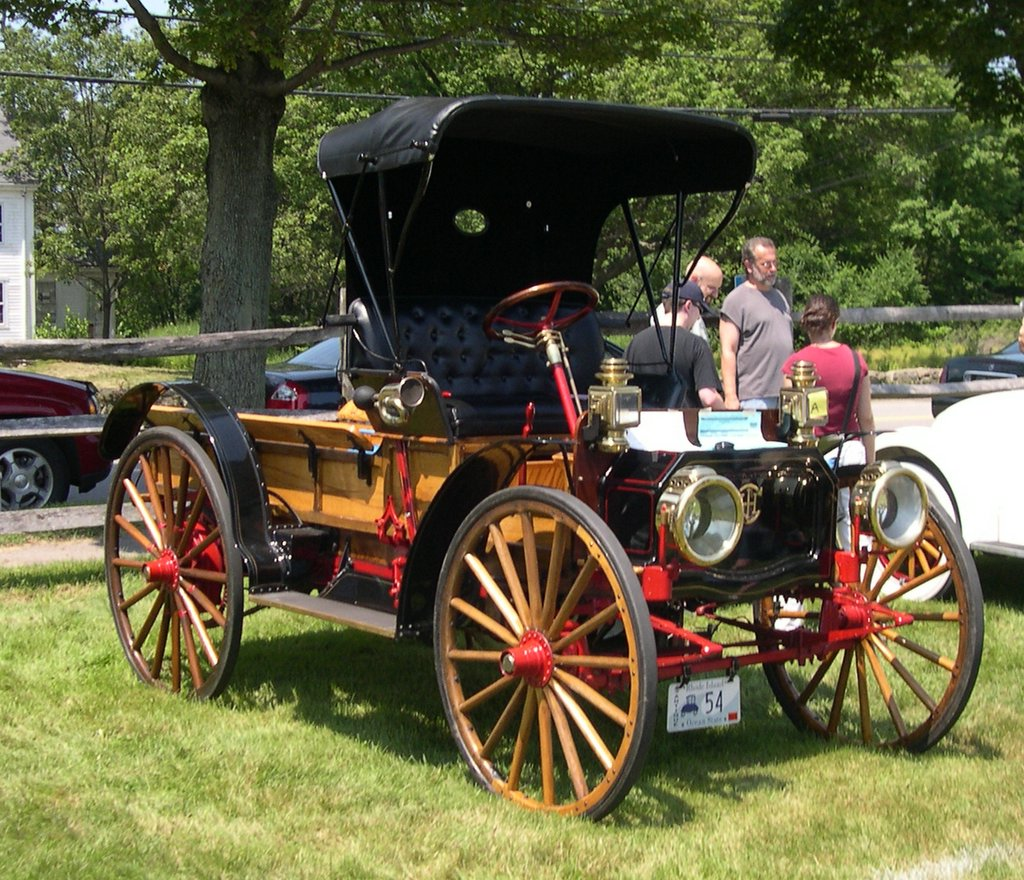
1911 International Harvester Auto Wagon (High wheeler)

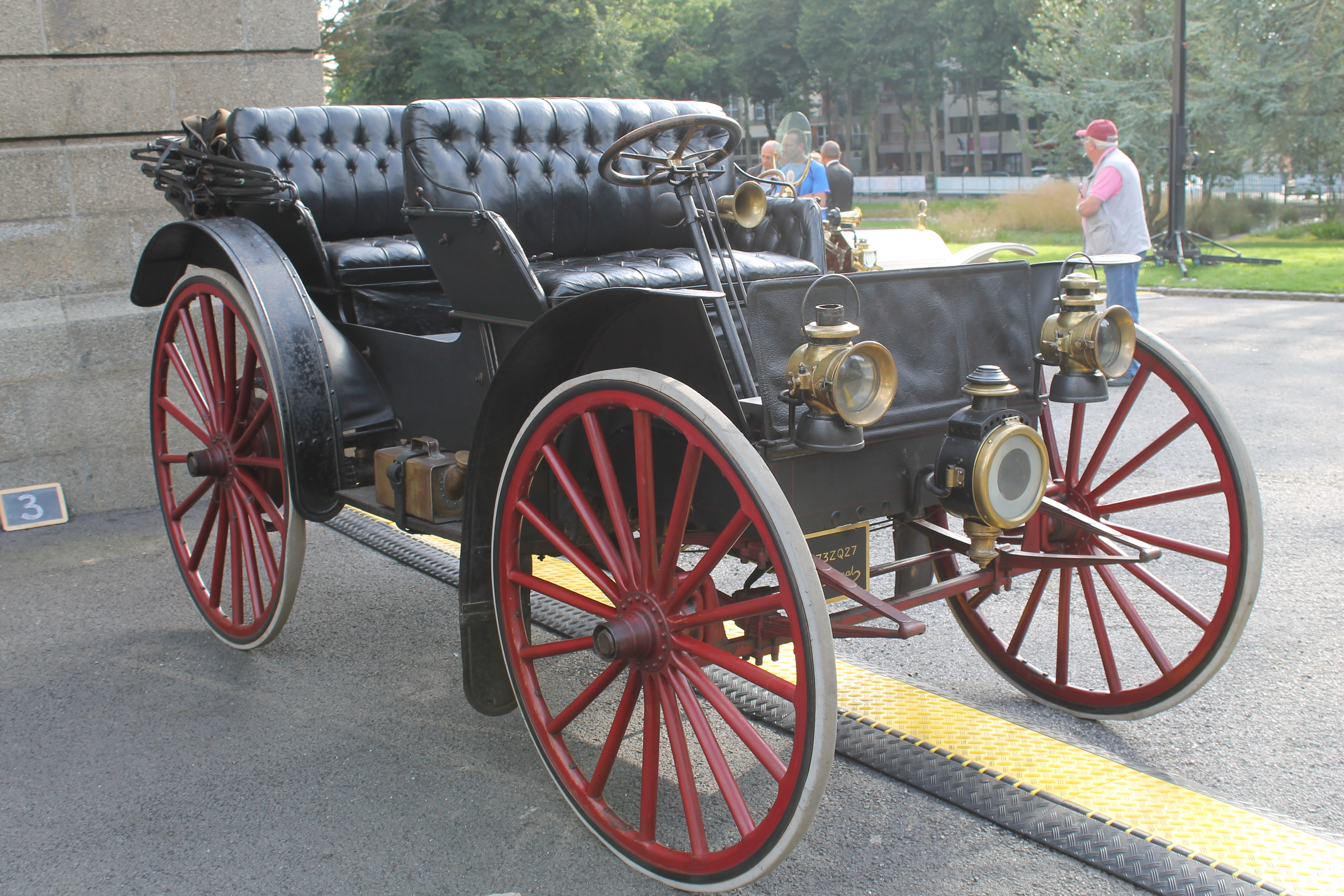
International Harvester Auto-Buggy

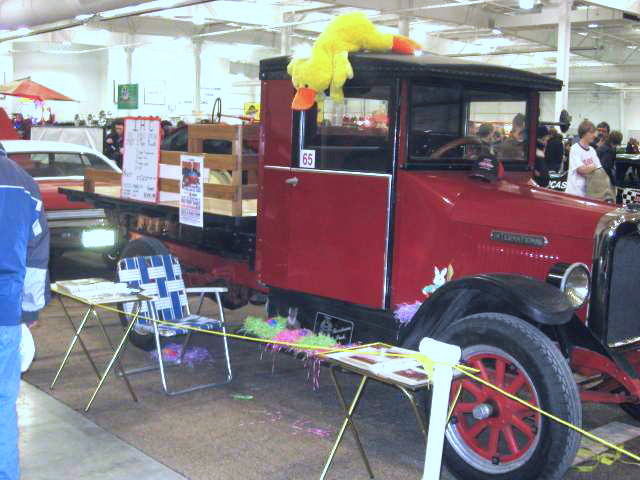
1927 International one-ton stakebed

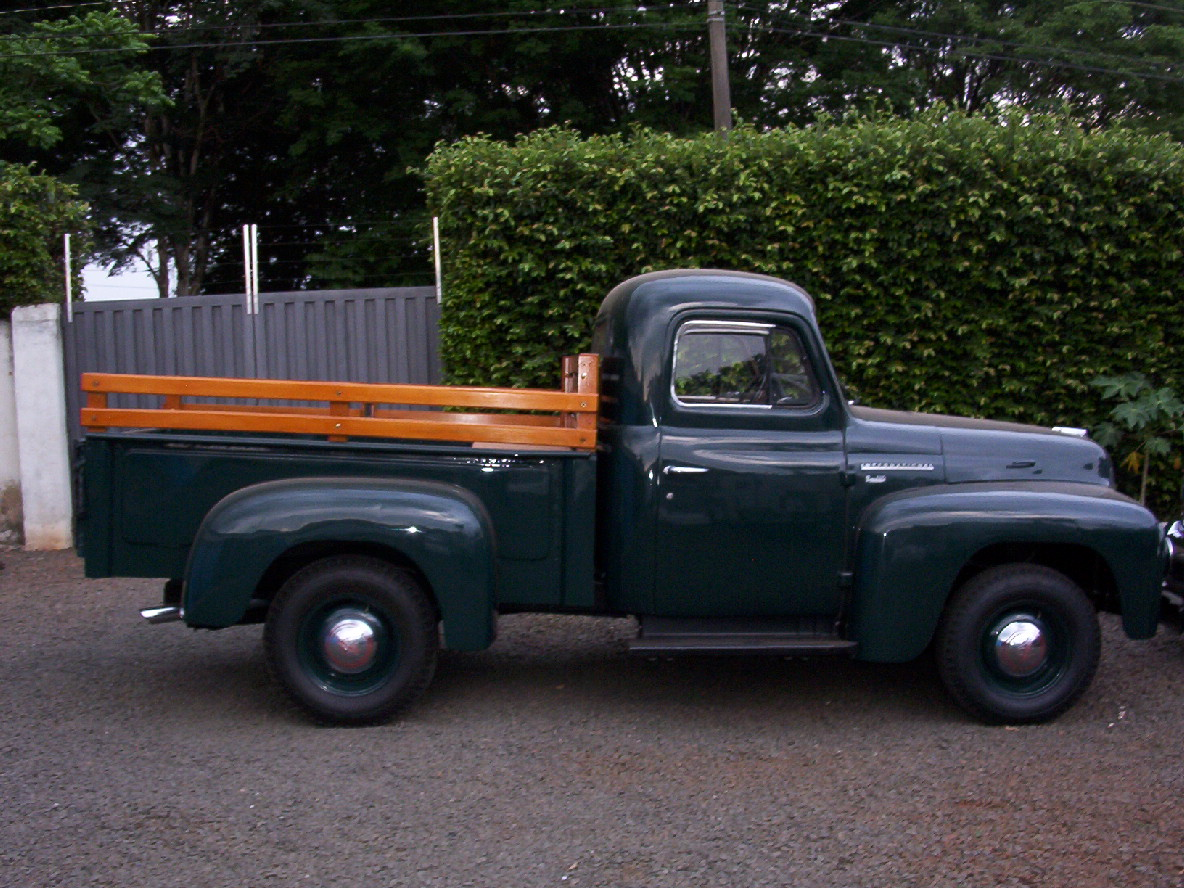
1954 R110 series pickup

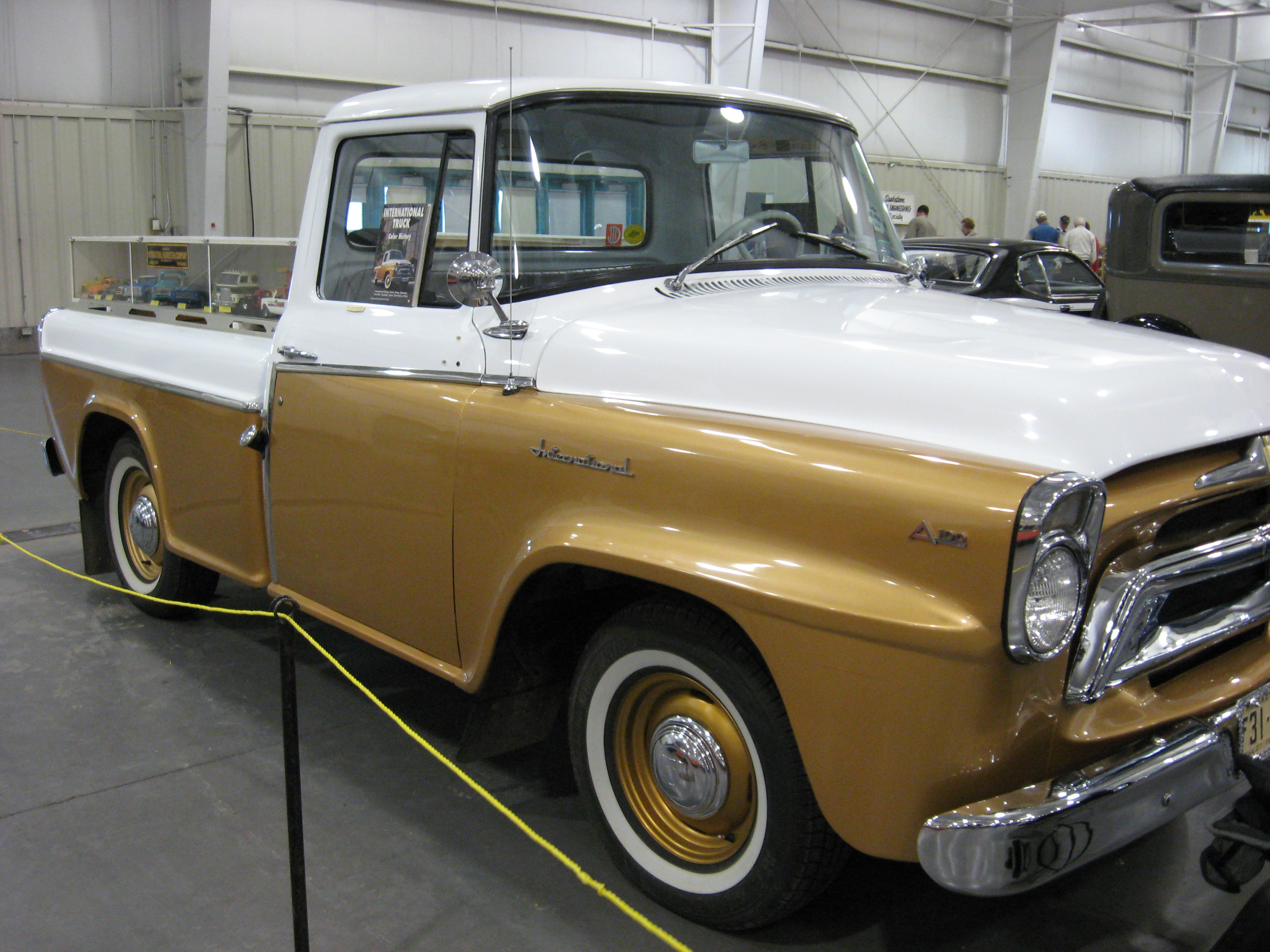
1957 A series pickup

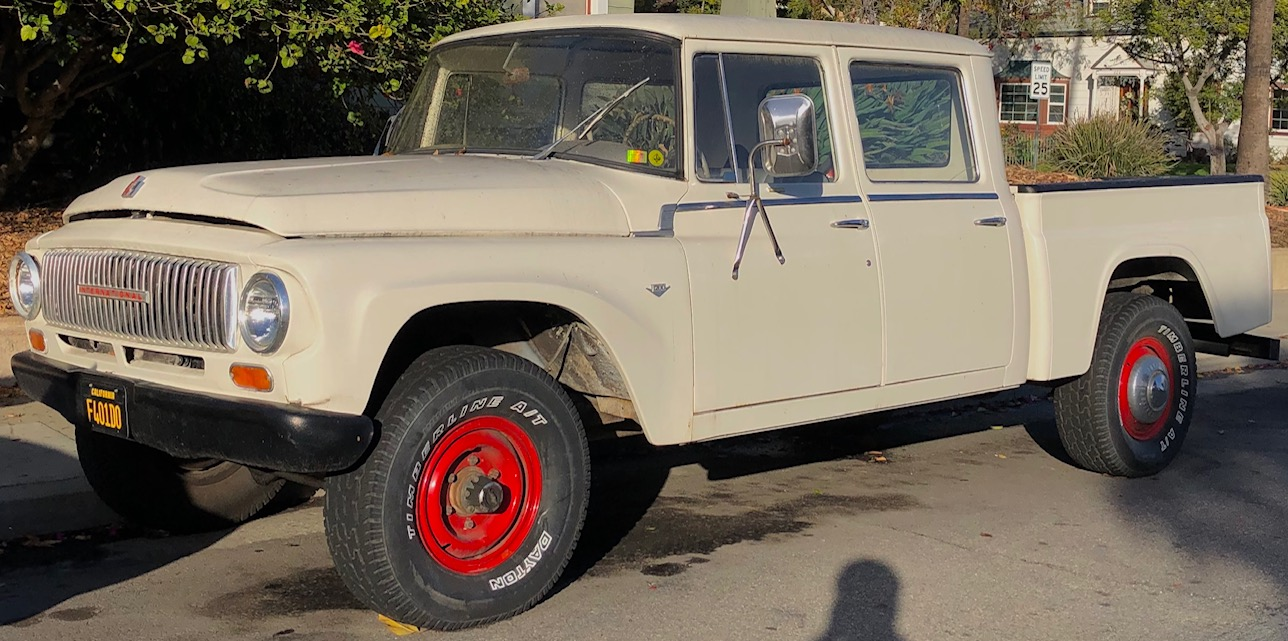
1965 International D1000 Travelette 4x4

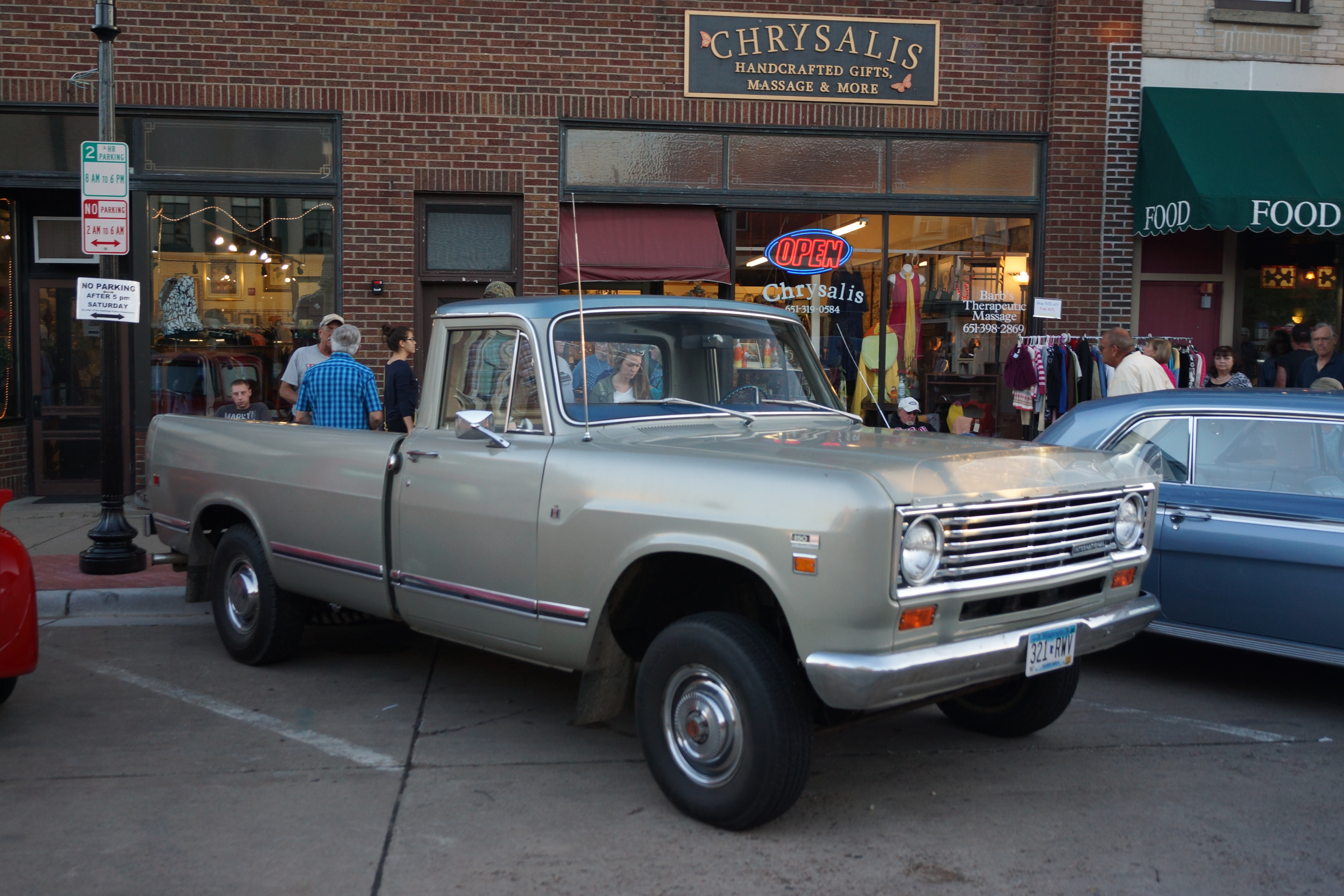
1975 International 150

==== Sport-utility vehicles ====
One of the company's light-duty vehicles was the Travelall, which was similar in concept to the Chevrolet Suburban. The Travelette was a crew cab, available in two- or four-wheel drive. A three-door version was available starting in 1957, and a four-door version was available starting in 1961. The 1961 Travelette four-door (crewcab) was the first six-passenger, four-door truck of its time.

The Scout, first introduced in 1961, is a small, two-door SUV, similar to a Jeep. In 1972, the Scout became the Scout II, and in 1974, Dana 44 axles, power steering, and power disc brakes became standard. After the Light Line pickups and Travelall were discontinued in 1975, the Scout Traveler and Terra became available, both with a longer wheelbase than a standard Scout II.

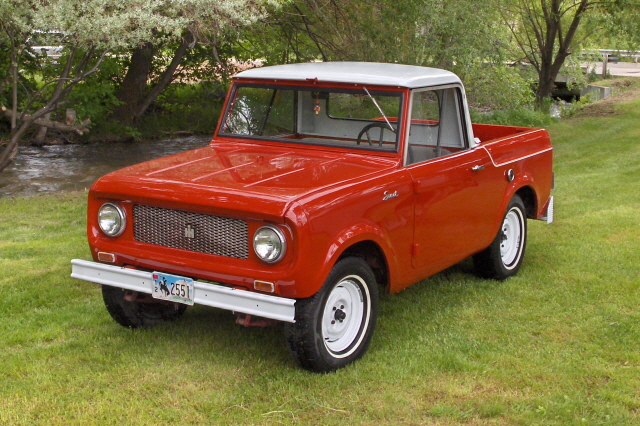
Red 1961 International Scout

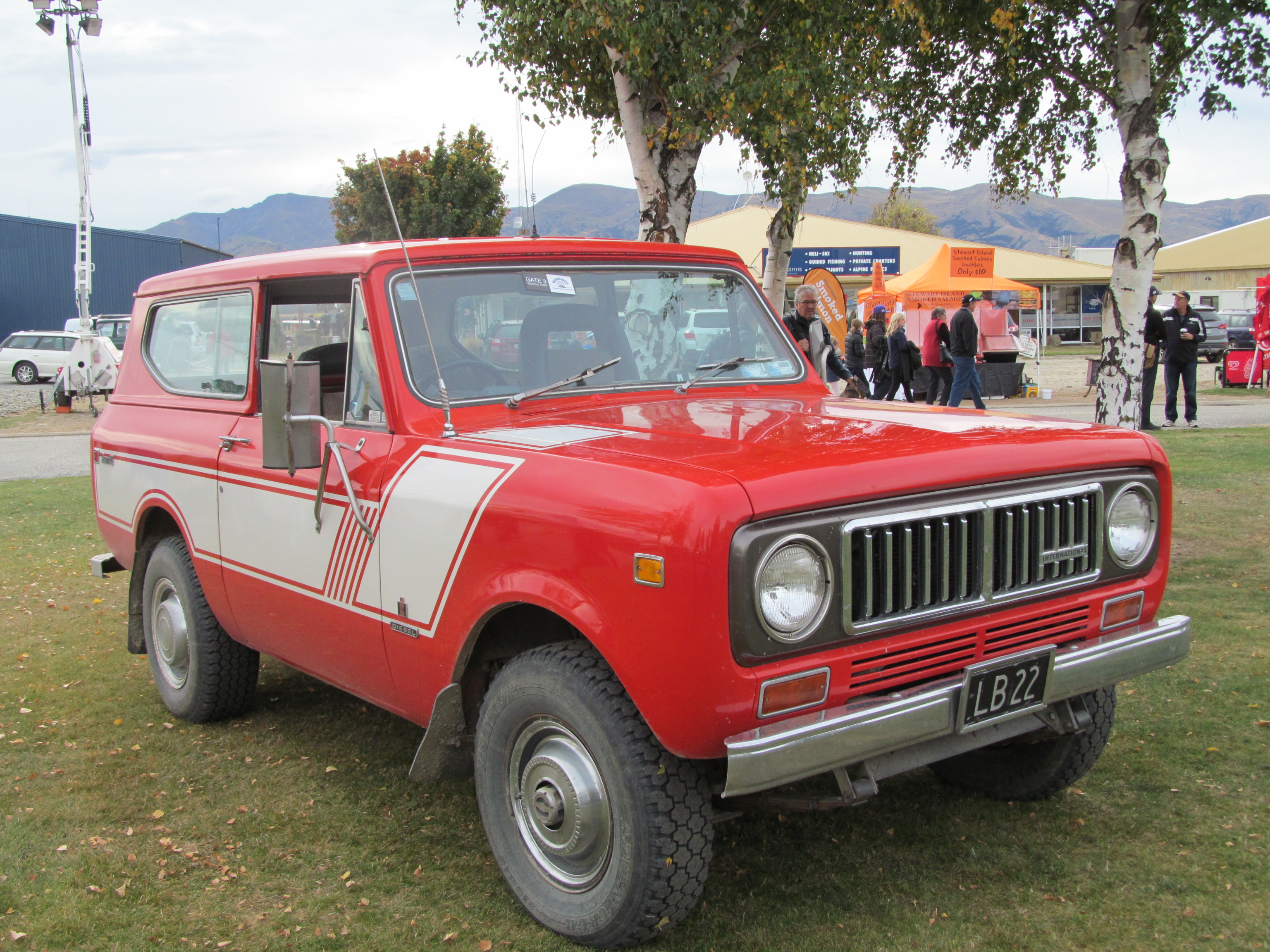
1973 International Scout

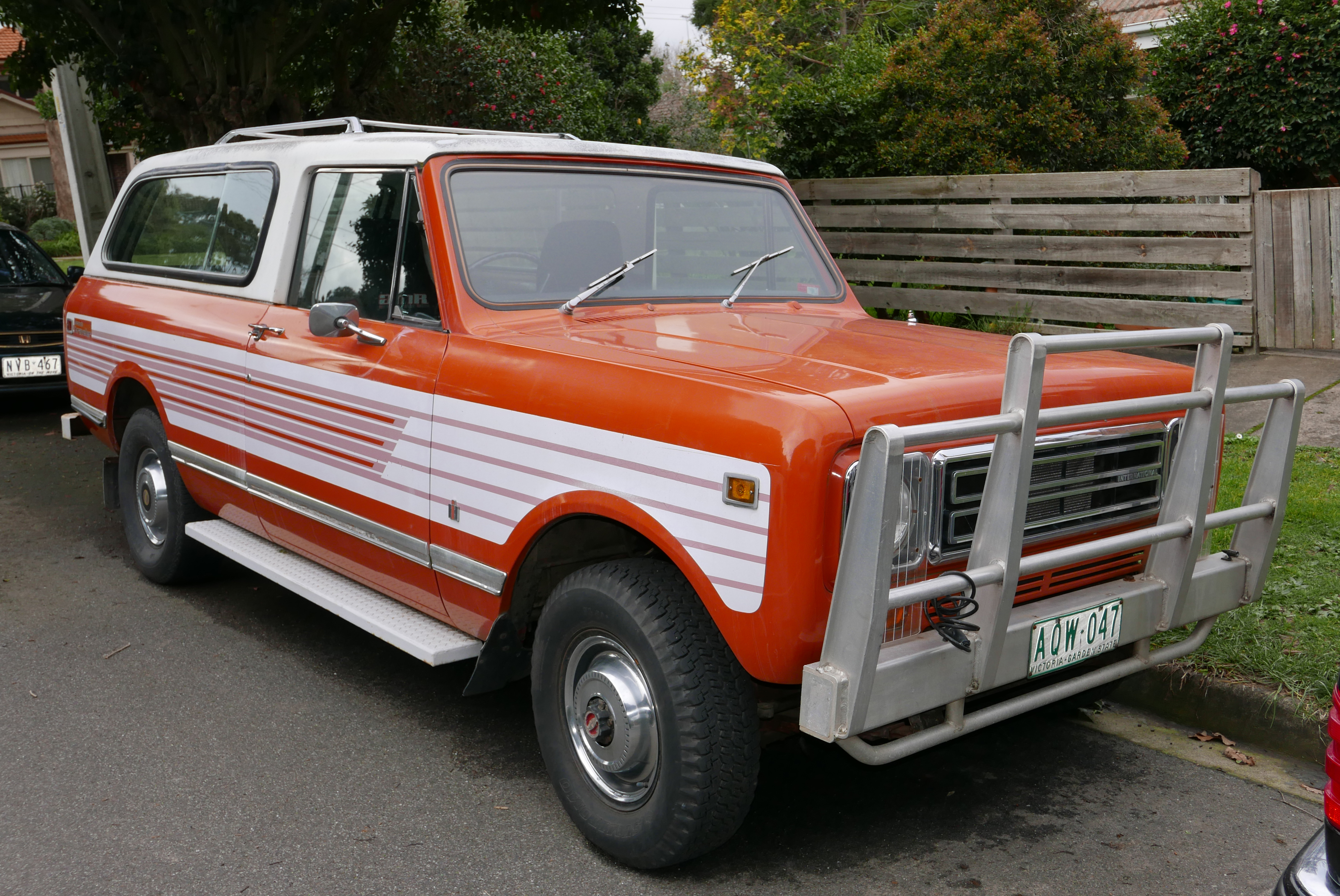
1979 International Scout II

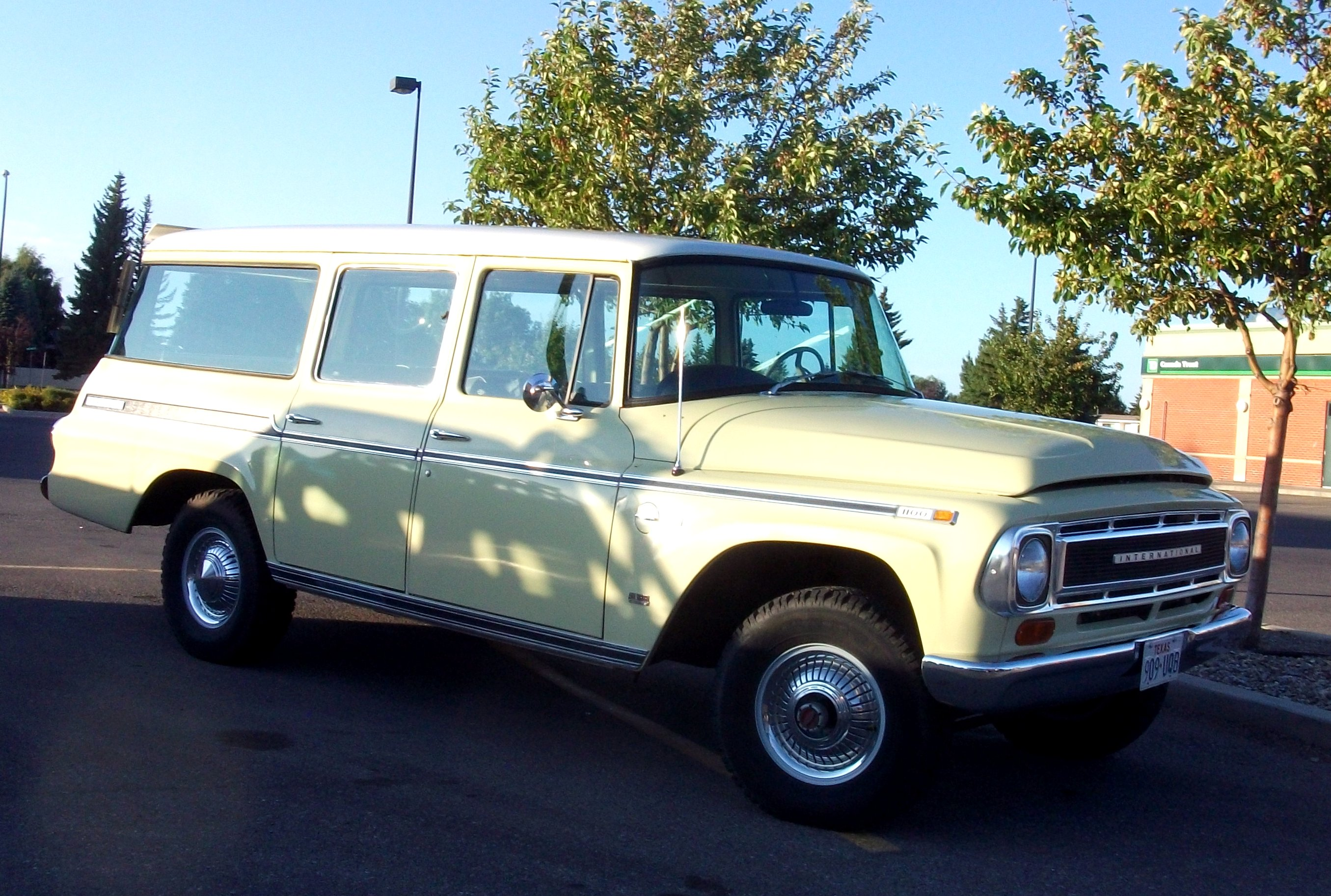
1968 International Travelall 1100C

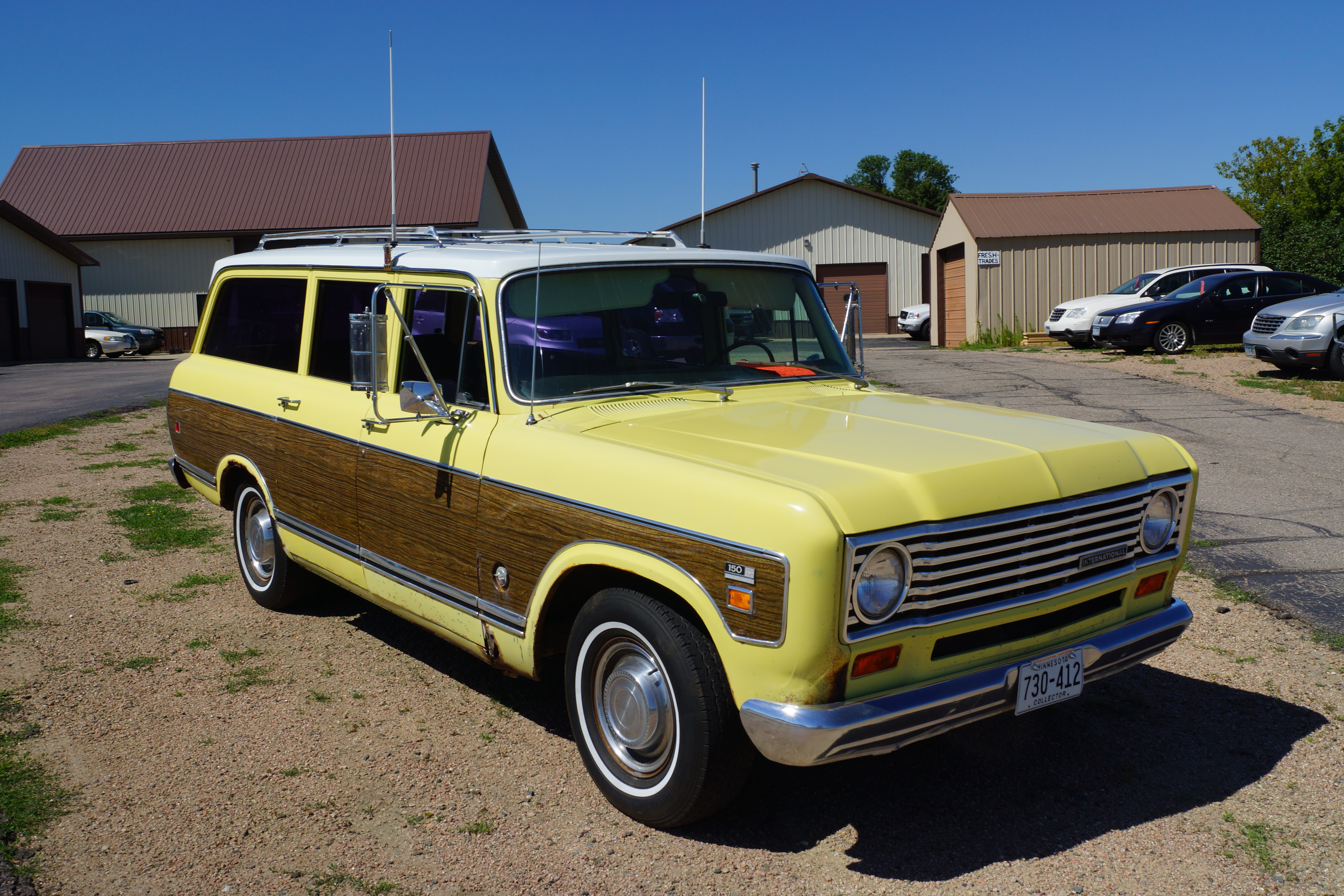
1975 International Travelall Custom 150

=== Motorhomes ===
In the 1970s, motorhomes were manufactured using IHC engines and bare chassis. Most of the bodies were constructed of fiberglass.

=== Commercial trucks (Truck and Engine Division) ===
International Harvester was an early manufacturer of medium- and heavy-duty trucks. Although based upon truck chassis, IH also became the leading manufacturer of the chassis portion of body-on-chassis conventional (type C) school buses. In 1962, IH offered the International Harvester Loadstar, which became the premier medium-duty truck. In 1978, IH offered the International Harvester S-Series, which replaced the Loadstar in 1979.

With the truck and engine divisions remaining following the 1985 sale of the agricultural division, International Harvester Company changed their corporate name to Navistar International in 1986. Today, Navistar International's subsidiary, International Truck and Engine Corporation, manufactures and markets trucks and engines under the International brand name. From 1983 to 2010, Ford Motor Company offered International V8 diesel engines in heavy-duty pickup trucks, vans, and SUVs (using the Power Stroke name after 1994).

==== 1920s ====
The following truck models are known from the 1920s.

- S-24 (1926–1930) 1,5 t
- S-26 (1926–1930) 1,5 t
- SF-34 (1926–1929) 2 t
- SF-36 (1926–1929) 2 t
- SL-34 (1927–1928) 2 t

==== 1960s ====
In 1961, the DCO-400 "Emeryville" model line was expanded with a conventional; officially named the D-400, the model line shared its cab with the COE and was the first International conventional produced with a tilting hood.

In 1962, International began to phase out the R-line series of trucks (dating to 1953). In place of a comprehensive model line ranging from half-ton pickup trucks to its largest Class 8 trucks, International introduced two purpose-built model lines for commercial use. Slotted above its Light Line pickup trucks, the Loadstar was a medium-duty conventional-cab truck. For 1963, International introduced the heavier-duty Fleetstar, a short-hood conventional slotted between the Loadstar and the heavier-duty R and V-Line conventionals. While no longer serving as a comprehensive model range, the Loadstar shared its cab with the A-series pickup truck (and its derivatives); as a cowled chassis, the Loadstar was produced for bus use (the IHC Schoolmaster). Sharing only its name with its conventional-cab namesake, the Loadstar CO was a low-cab COE (with a forward-tilting cab).

In 1965, International introduced the CO-4000, the first heavy-duty COE designed entirely by the company, replacing the DCO-400 "Emeryville" COE (which sourced its cab design from Diamond T). In a design feature that would be adopted by International COEs into the 1990s, the cab was designed with a large trapezoidal grille.

In 1968, International redesigned the Fleetstar, adopting the cab of the Light Line pickups. Renamed the Fleetstar-A, the redesign marked the consolidation of the Fleetstar with the previous R-line and V-line trucks. The largest R-210 and R-230 remained (dropping their R prefix) alongside the newly introduced M-series as the largest International trucks, sharing a common cab (dating back to 1952). The Transtar name made its first appearance, as the CO-4000 was replaced by the Transtar CO4070/4090; while visually similar to its predecessor, the Transtar CO was designed with an all-new cab (to accommodate larger diesel engines).

For 1969, International introduced the final version of the Emeryville model line, with the DC-400 Transtar 400 replacing the D-400.

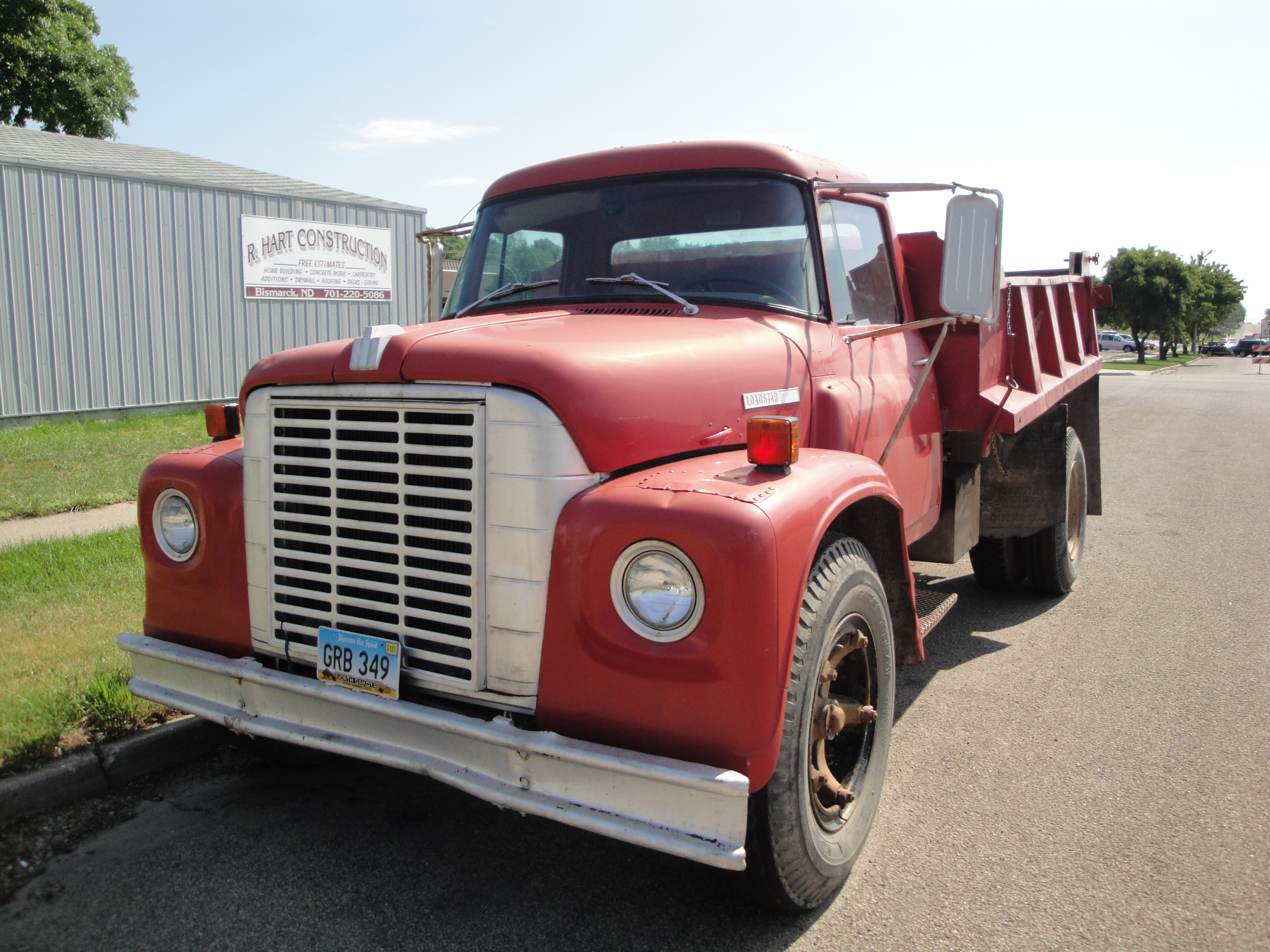
Late 1960s-early 1970s Loadstar 1700

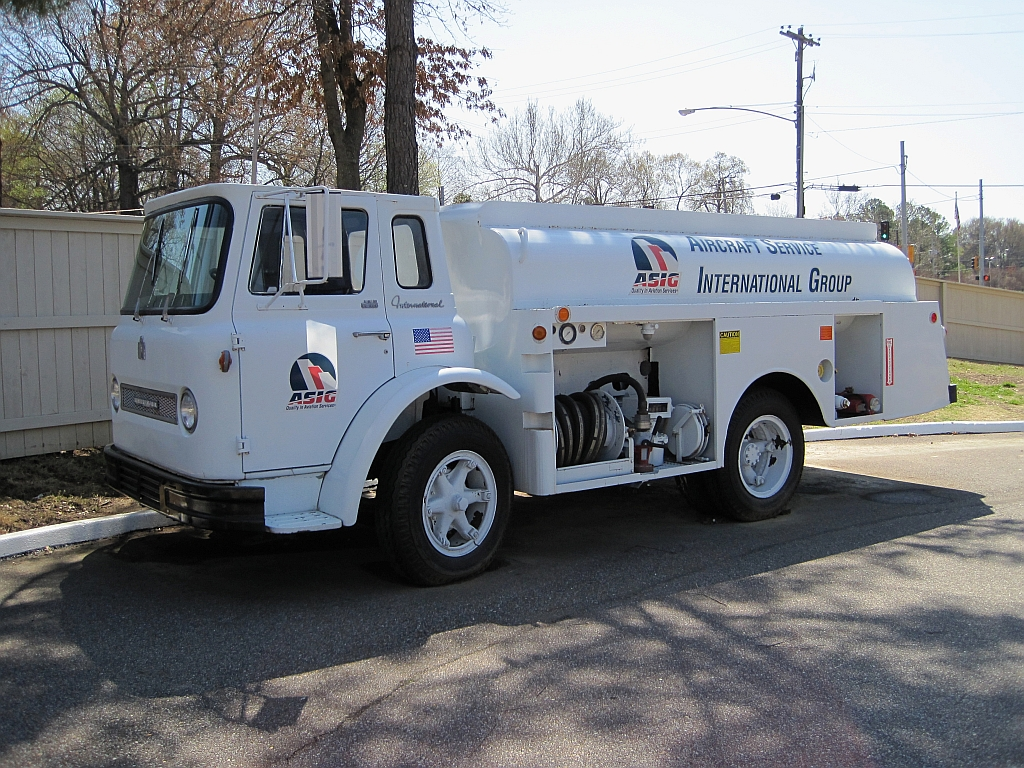
1960s Loadstar CO1700

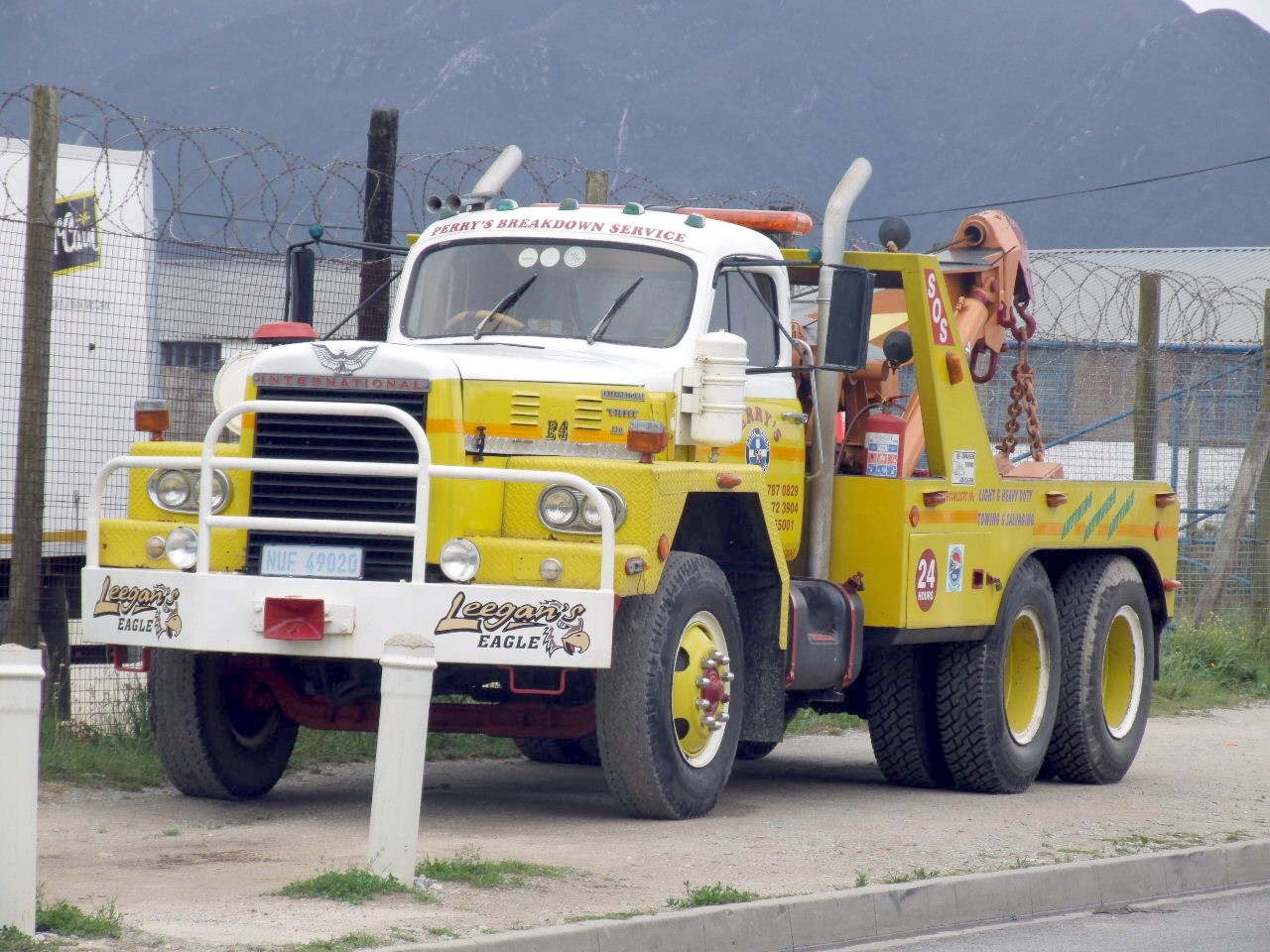
1960-1971 210 in service as tow truck (export)

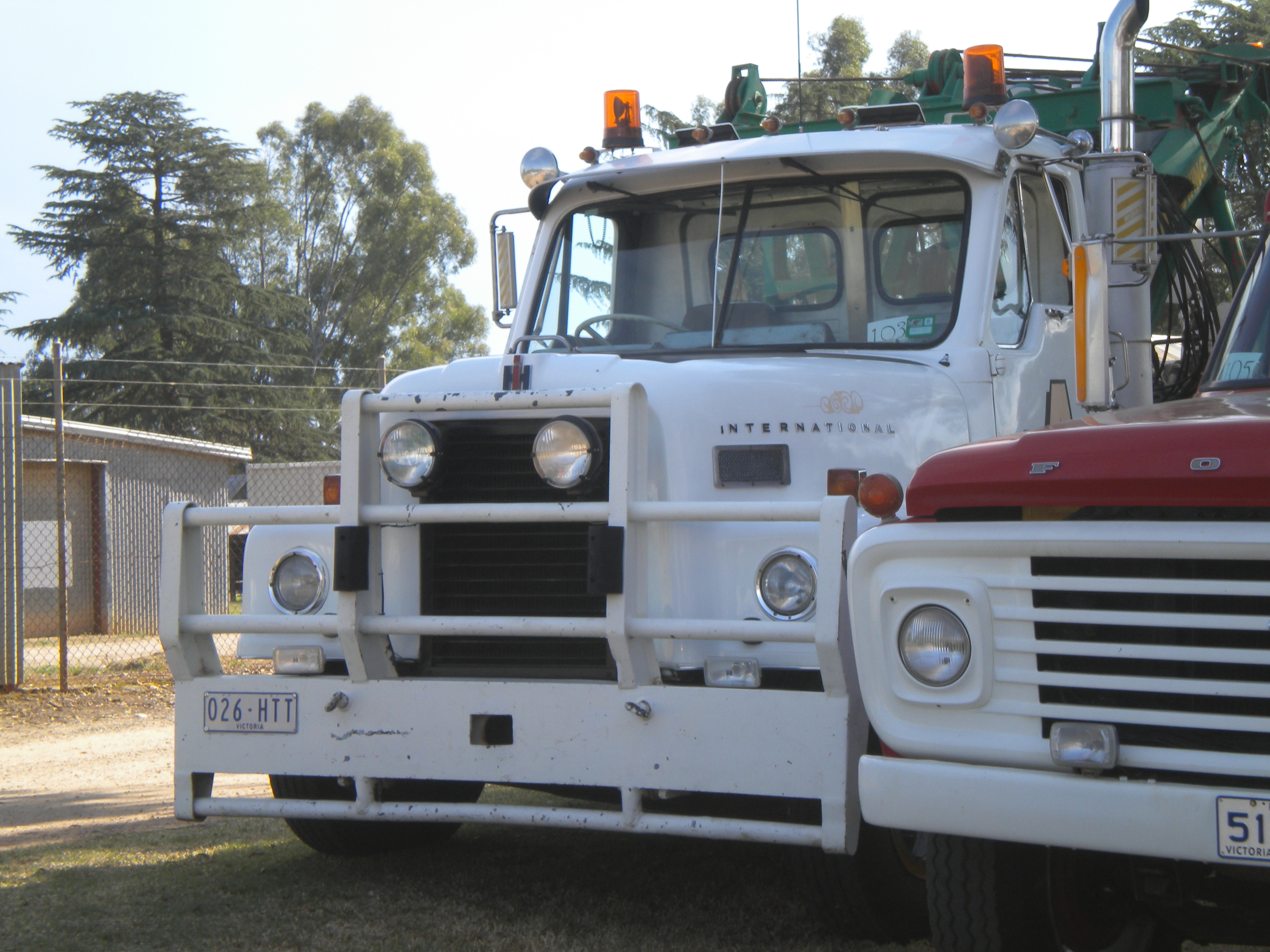
1969-1971 Transtar 400 (export)

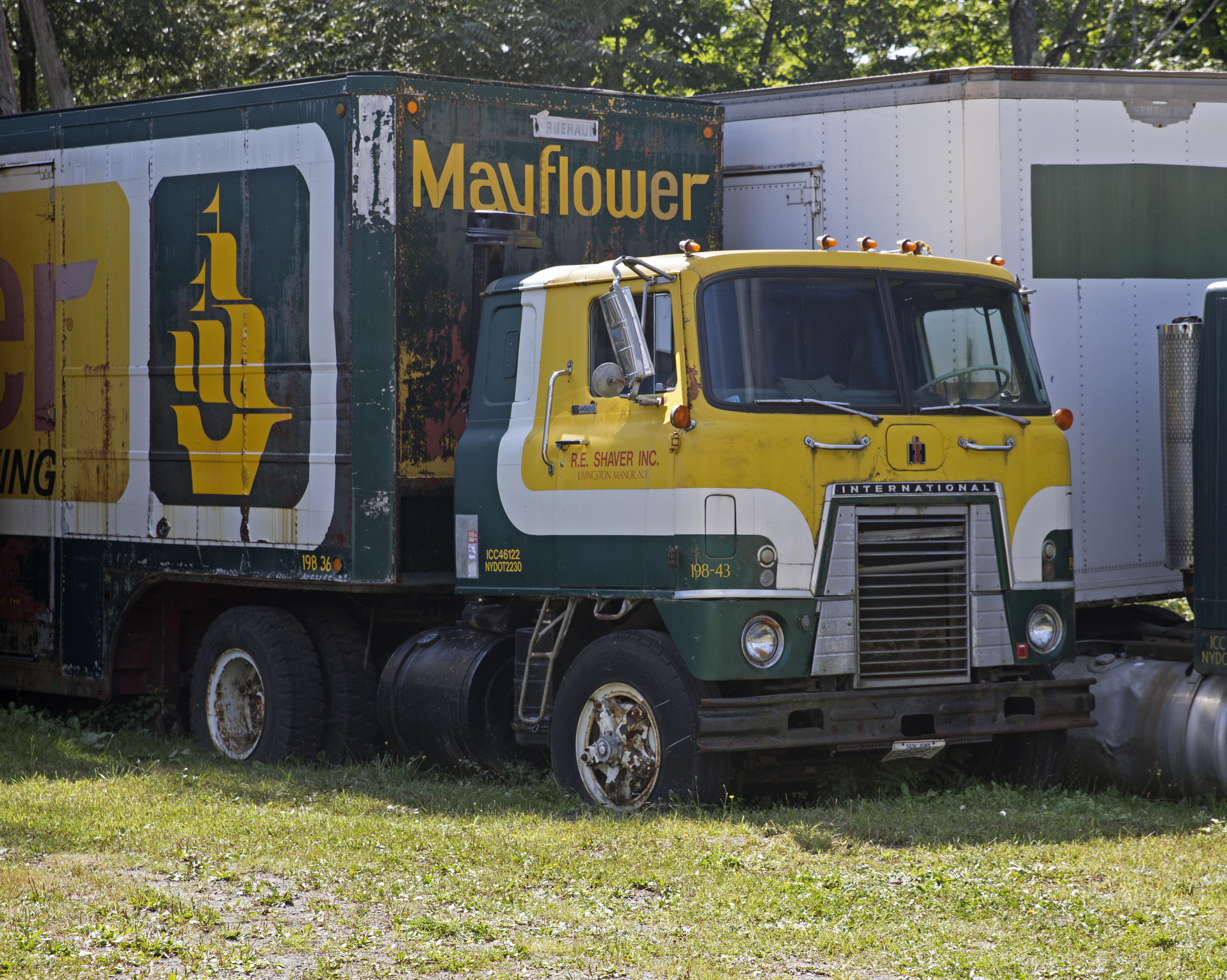
1965-1968 CO-4000 COE

==== 1970s ====
In 1970, International split the CO Loadstar into its own product line, dubbed the Cargostar. As part of a model update, the Cargostar received a larger grille and wider cab than its predecessor. Competing directly against the Ford C-Series, the Cargostar was a medium-duty truck fitted with a choice of gasoline or diesel engine (shared with the Loadstar conventional).

1971 marked the end of the "Emeryville" product lines, as the DC-400 Transtar 400 was replaced by the Transtar 4200/4300. Developed as a Class 8 highway tractor, the Transtar 4200/4300 introduced an all-new cab that International heavy-duty trucks continued to use through 1999. Competing against a wide range of manufacturers, IH offered the Transtar conventional in short and long-hood configurations for both regional and long-distance shipping.

In 1972, IH introduced the Paystar 5000 series to replace the 210/230 and M-series trucks (which dated to 1952). Developed for severe-service use (primarily construction and related applications), the Paystar shared its cab with the Transtar, but used a heavier-duty chassis, steel fenders, and a flat-panel hood. The medium-duty Loadstar received an optional tilting hood with a larger grille and straighter-edge fenders (updating its appearance for the first time in 10 years).

In 1974, IH introduced the Transtar II COE, following a redesign of the Transtar. Recognizable by its top-mounted windshield wipers, the Transtar II standardized the previous raised-cab option, as the previous 852-cubic-inch Detroit Diesel 12V71 V12 was replaced by some of the largest-displacement engines that had ever been fitted to a road-going vehicle at that time, including the Cummins KTA diesel I6 (1,150 cubic inches) and the Caterpillar 3408 diesel V8 (1,099 cubic inches). On the other end of the size scale, the Cargostar underwent a second update, with a slightly wider cab and a much larger grille (which shares the black trim band of the Transtar COE grille).

For 1976, International launched its "Eagle" flagship brand, used into the 2010s.

In 1977, the International S-series consolidated the Fleetstar and Loadstar into a single model range. While less comprehensive than the product ranges of the 1930s to the 1950s, the S-series product line included medium-duty, heavy-duty, severe-service, and highway trucks (along with a new generation of the Schoolmaster bus chassis) in the Class 5 to Class 8 size ranges. At its 1977 launch, the S-series replaced the Fleetstar. Lighter-duty models to replace the Loadstar were phased in during 1979. Competing against an extensive segment of the truck industry, the S-Series came in multiple layouts, hood lengths, and axle configurations; gasoline and diesel engines were offered.

Produced as a cowled chassis (Schoolmaster), straight truck, or semitractor, IH produced the S-Series from 1977 to 2004, making it the longest production run for the company (as either International Harvester or Navistar).

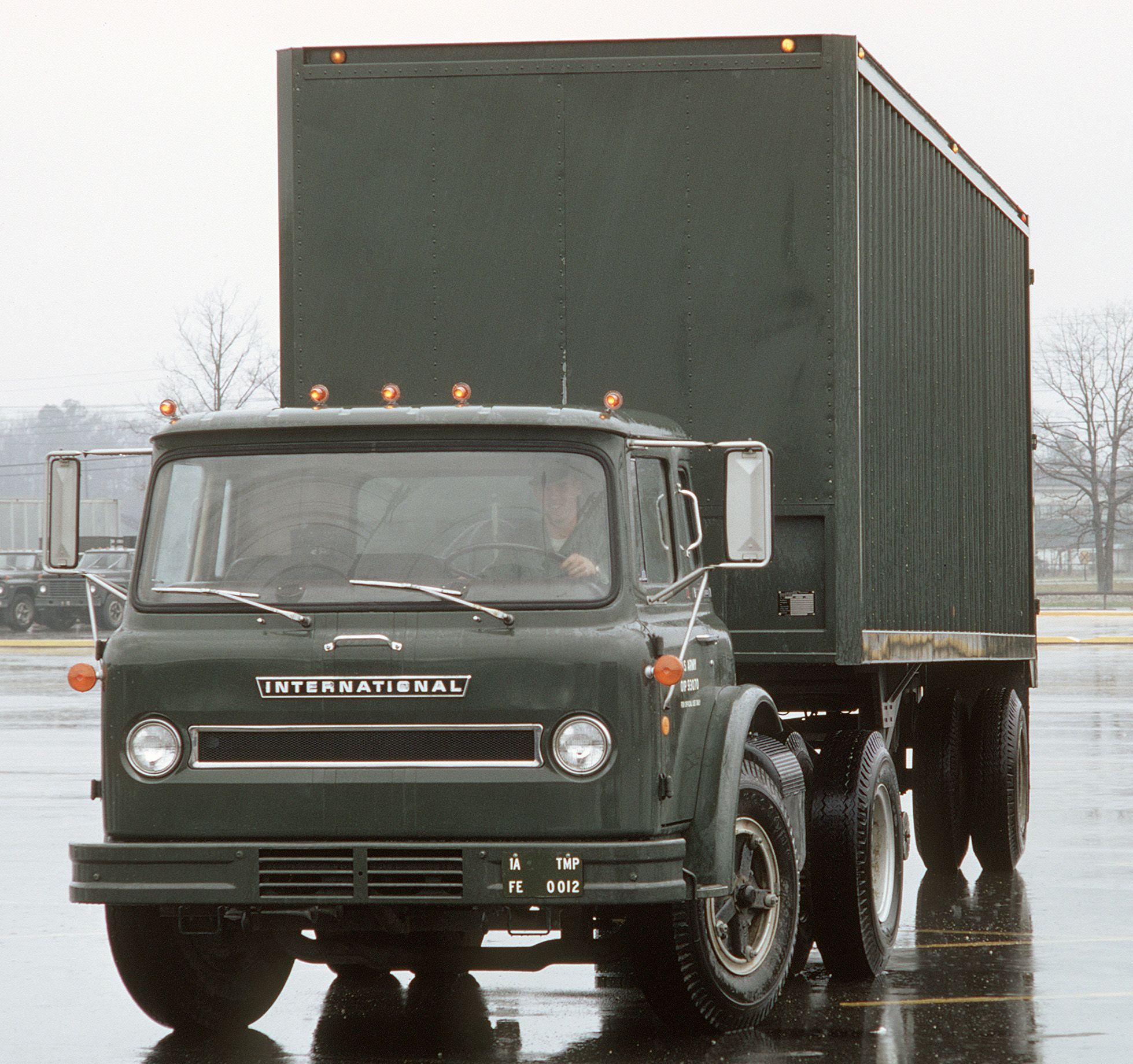
1970-1973 Cargostar

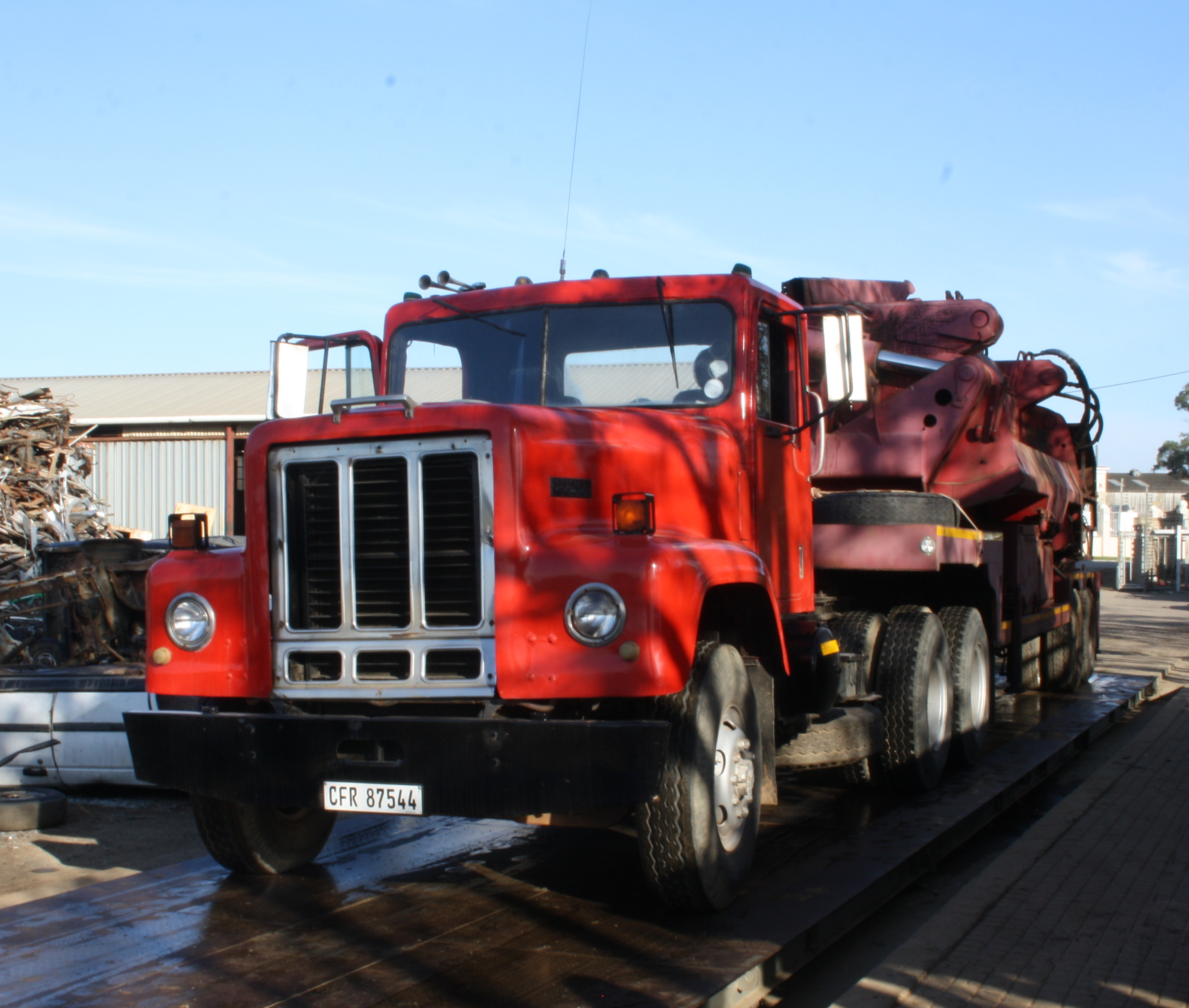
Late 1970s Paystar 5000 (export)

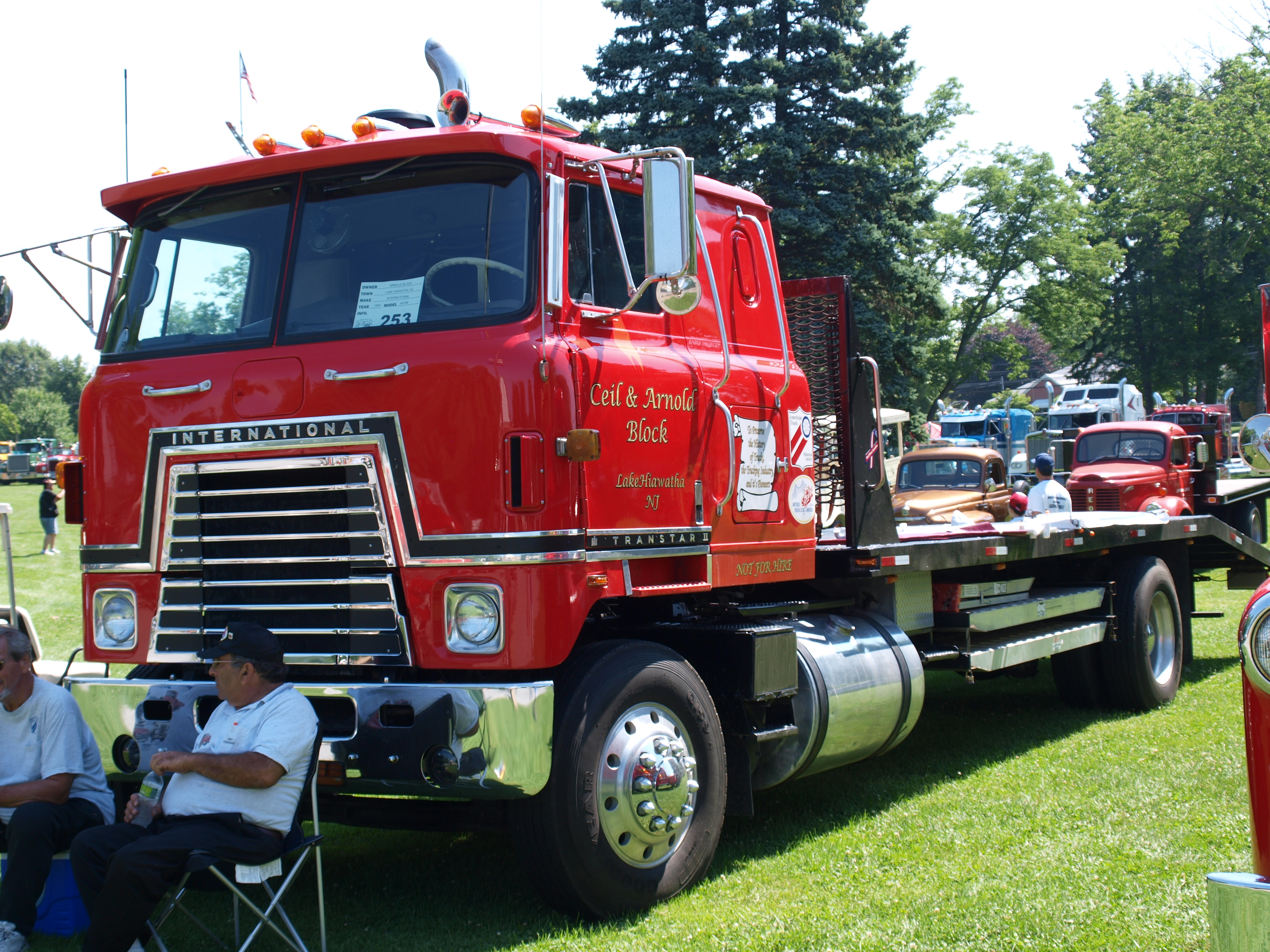
1974-1980 Transtar II COE

==== 1980s ====
In 1981, International introduced the CO9670, replacing the Transtar II. Sharing only the trapezoidal grille with the previous Transtar II, the CO9670 was designed with a larger cab with improved visibility and improved access (larger windshield, shared doors with the Transtar/Paystar conventional); to increase fuel economy, the Cummins KTA diesel was replaced by a turbocharged Cummins N-series I6.

For 1985, the Transtar conventional was reintroduced, becoming the International 9000 series; while the short-hood Transtar was discontinued (overlapped by the S2200 and S2300 Class 8 tractors), the long-hood 4300 was renamed the International 9370. Sharing its cab with the Transtar, the 9370 was restyled with a larger grille and vertically stacked quad headlamps.

After seeing almost no change since 1974, International ended production of the Cargostar (the final Loadstar-based truck). As the company did not develop a tilt-cab truck derived from the S-series (or a distinct vehicle), International introduced the 400/500/700/900 low-cab COE, produced by Nissan Diesel (UD). The first imported vehicle marketed by the company, the 400-900 was marketed through 1991.

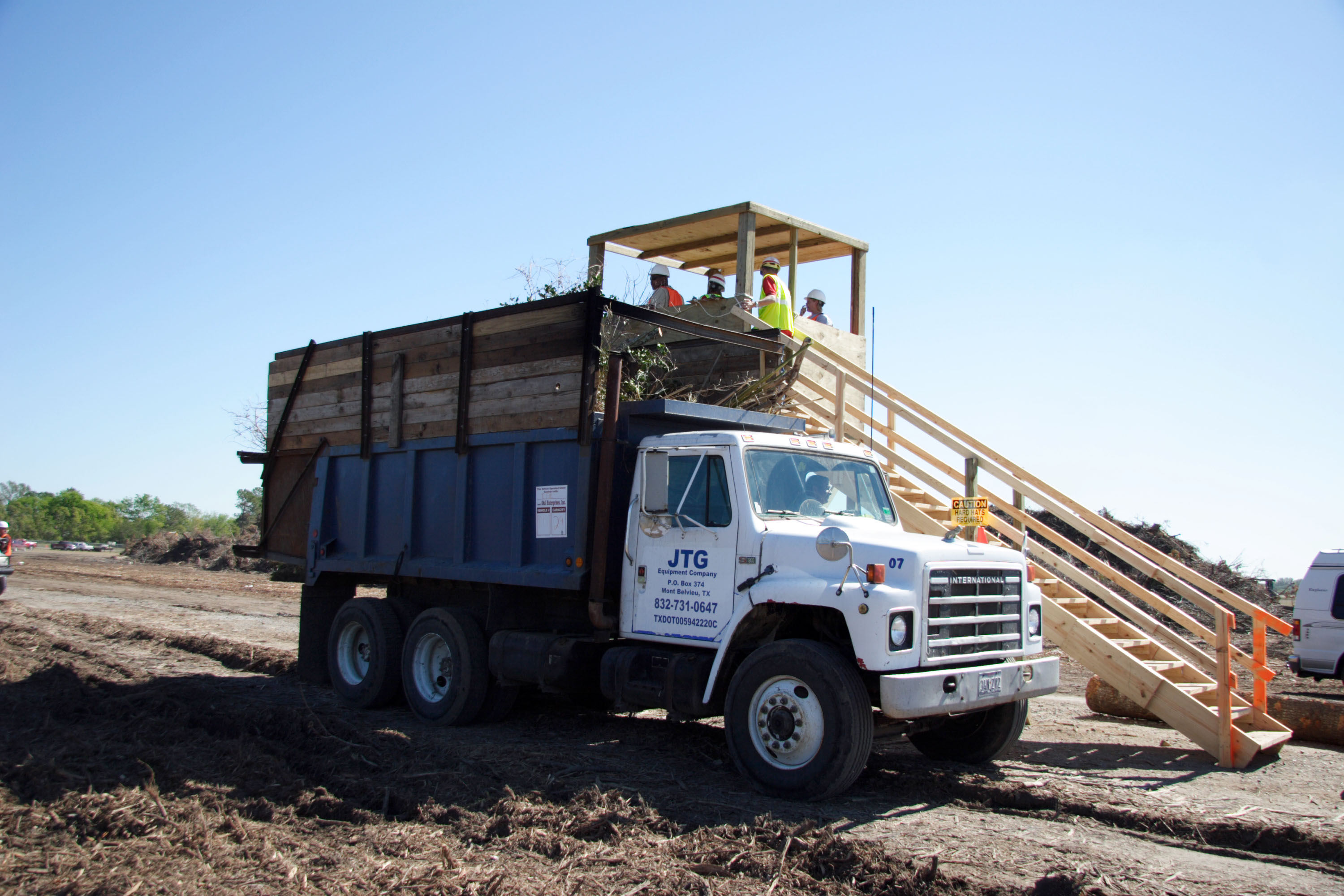
Early 1980s S1900 dump truck

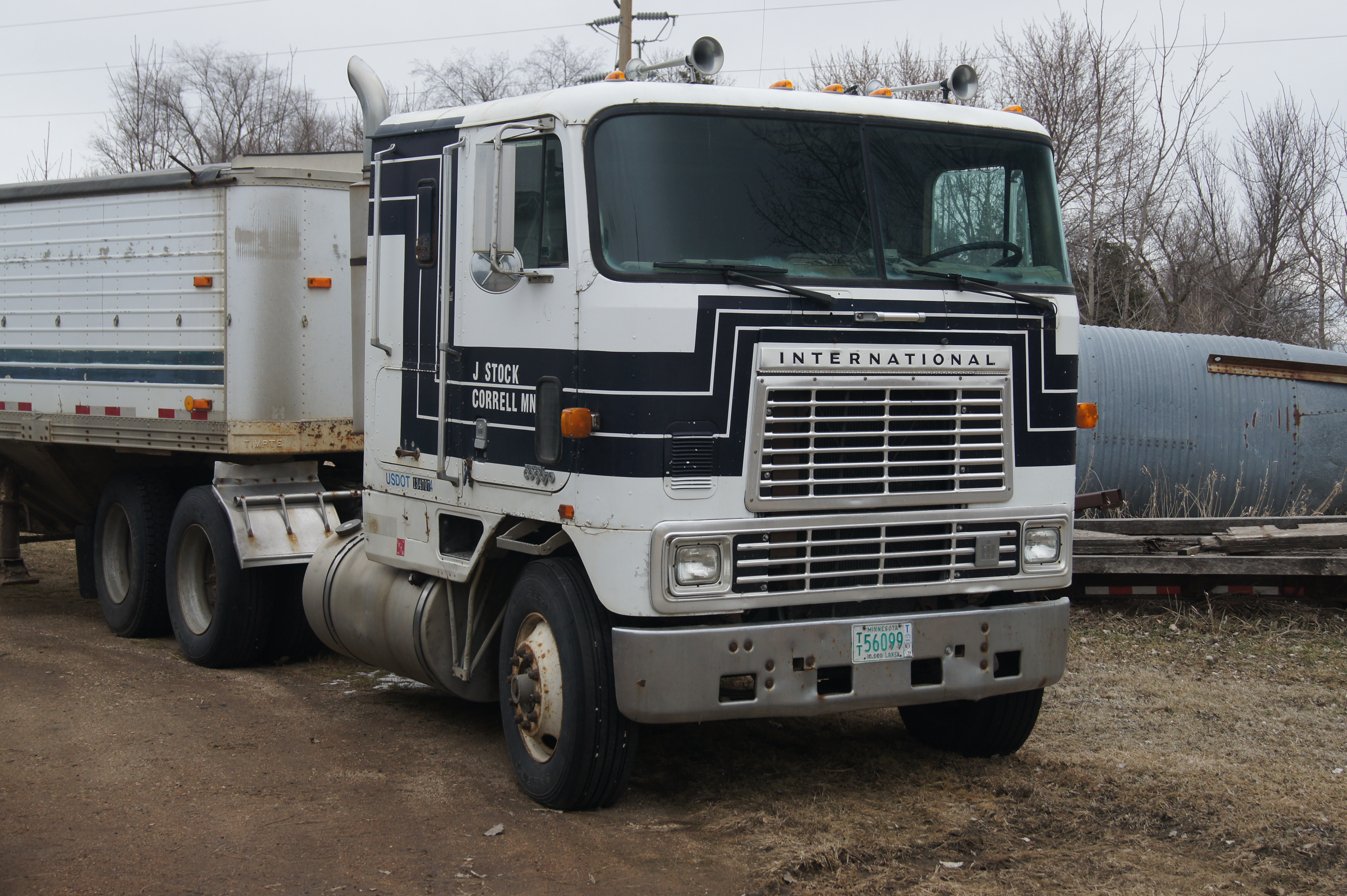
1984 International CO9670

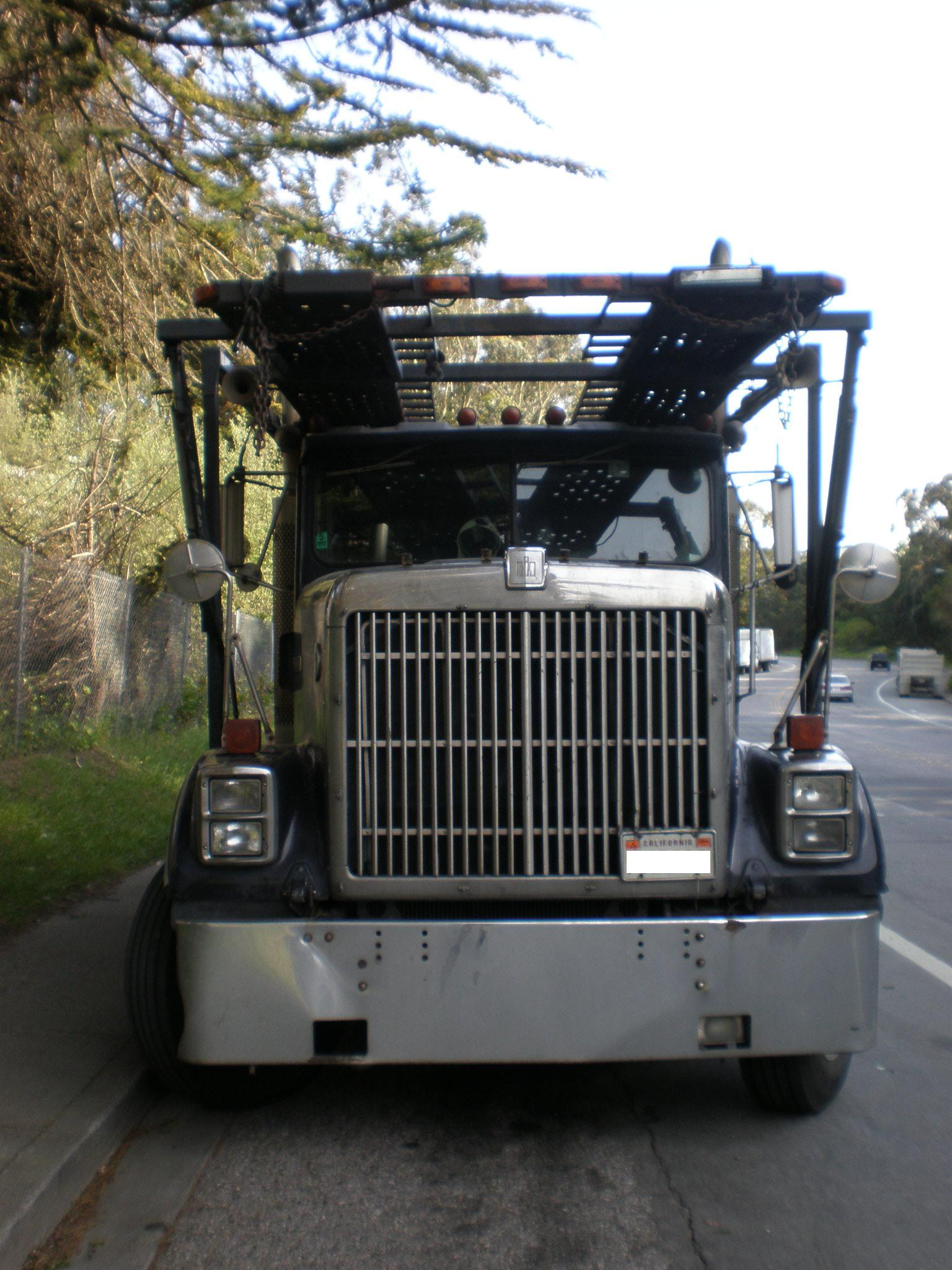
1985-1988 9370 Eagle (front view)

== Overseas subsidiaries ==
=== Australia ===
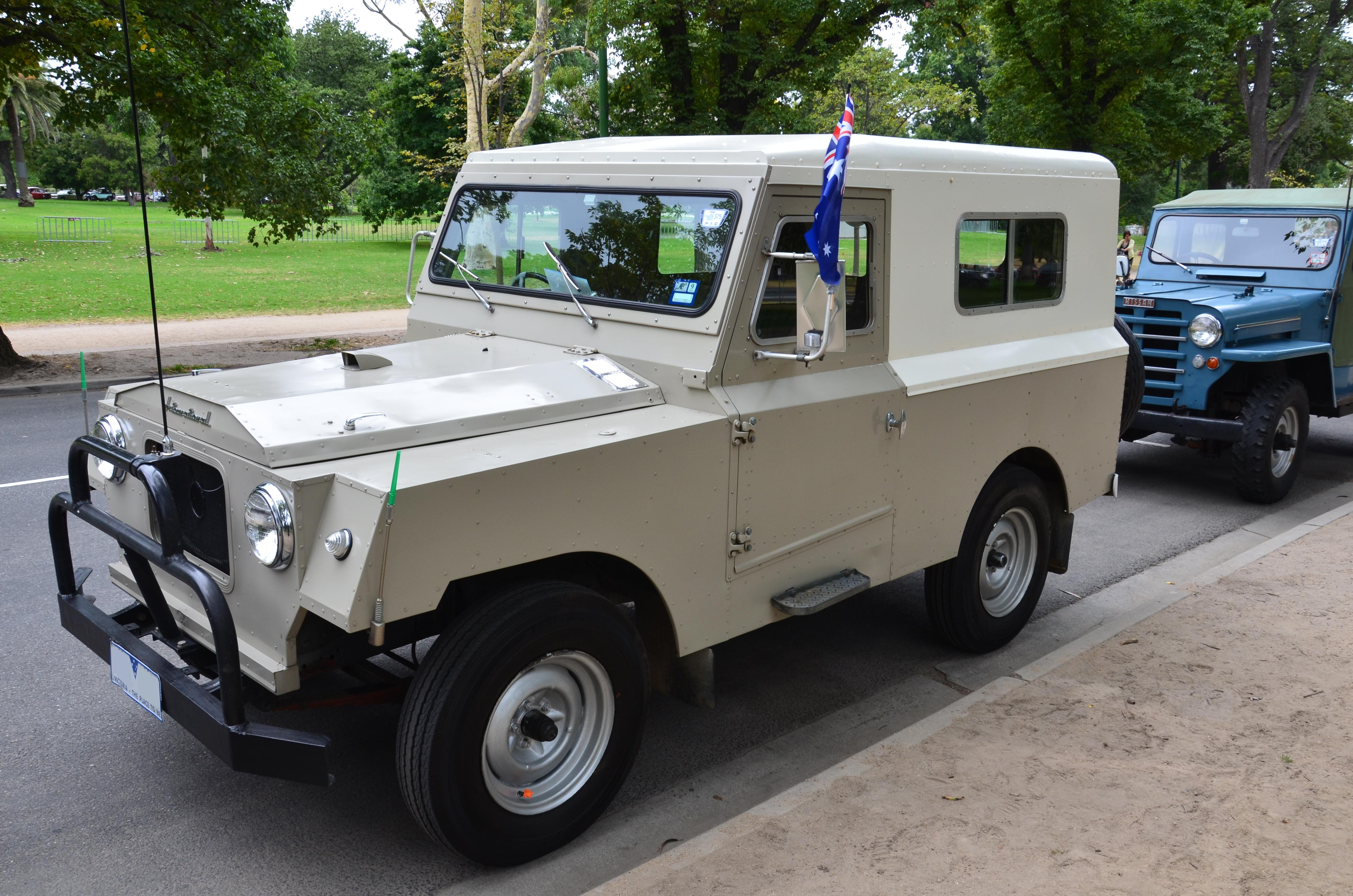
1953 International Utility

==== Australian Army designs ====
International Harvester Australia, a subsidiary of the US manufacturer, had a long relationship with the Australian Army with the US-designed AS series trucks in the early 1950s. The AS164 4x2 was used as a tractor unit and the 4x2 AS161 was used as a trayback troop transport.

The association between International Harvester Australia and the Australian Army developed and in conjunction with the Army Design Establishment of the Australian Commonwealth Department of Supply, designed and constructed a range of trucks for the Australian Army. With the body loosely based upon the design of cab 13 of the Canadian Military Pattern truck, the first prototype built in 1959 was the International Truck Cargo 2 1/2 Ton General Service, Australian No.1 Mk1. which was followed by the Mk2 prototype. A variant with a midmounted, 20,000-lb winch, resulted in the first production model, the Mk3 entering service in 1963 – just in time for Australia's entry into the Vietnam War.

A five-ton 6×6 version followed with three major variants: the Truck Cargo 5 Ton with winch F1 which replaced the Mk3 in Vietnam service. The F2 was a tipper version that replaced the International Harvester AB160 "teaspoon Tipper" in both the Vietnam and Borneo theatres of operations. The F5 wrecker with a lack of 4×4 2 1/2 ton trucks available because of the Vietnam War, the Mk3 was supplemented with further 4×4 production with the updated Mk4 version which shared the cab with the 6×6 variants. Production of the Australian No. 1 range of trucks continued until 1973. The Mk3, Mk4, F1, F2 and F5 saw service until the late 1980s.

==== ACCO ====
The Australian-designed and built International Australian A-line Cab Over (AACO) was first produced in the late 1960s and later in 1972 the Australian C-line Cab Over (ACCO). The ACCO is a cab over engine type truck and has been offered in 4x2, 4x4, 6x2, 6x4, 8x4, and 10x4 configurations. Engines used were Cummins, Caterpillar, Detroit Diesel, Perkins, Neuss or GMC with Road-Ranger or Allison transmissions and Rockwell differentials. The ACCO range was built to order, serving private operators, fire departments, military services, and municipal departments across Australia and New Zealand. The cabs for NZ assembled Accos were welded, painted, wired, glazed and trimmed, using locally sourced parts and materials, by Steel's Motor Assemblies, formed by the parent truck trailer making company in the mid-1960s to assemble Prince/Nissan Gloria sedans and later also assembled Toyota Corona sedans and other models. Upholstery vinyl was shared with the contemporary Toyota cars. The ACCO became the most popular product of International Harvester in Australia. The ACCO was discontinued in November 2019 and replaced by a locally built European-designed ACCO, under the ownership of Iveco.

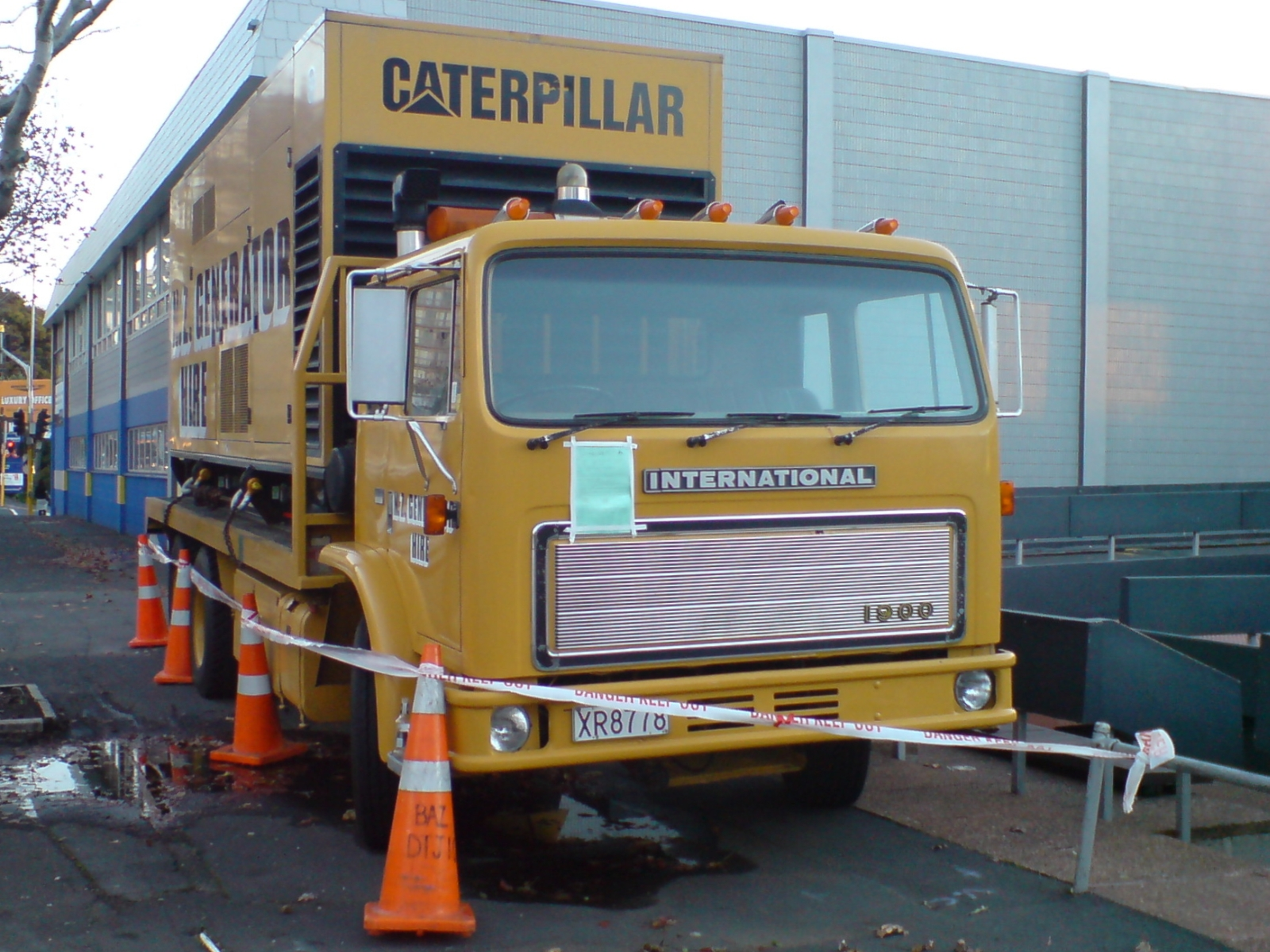
International ACCO

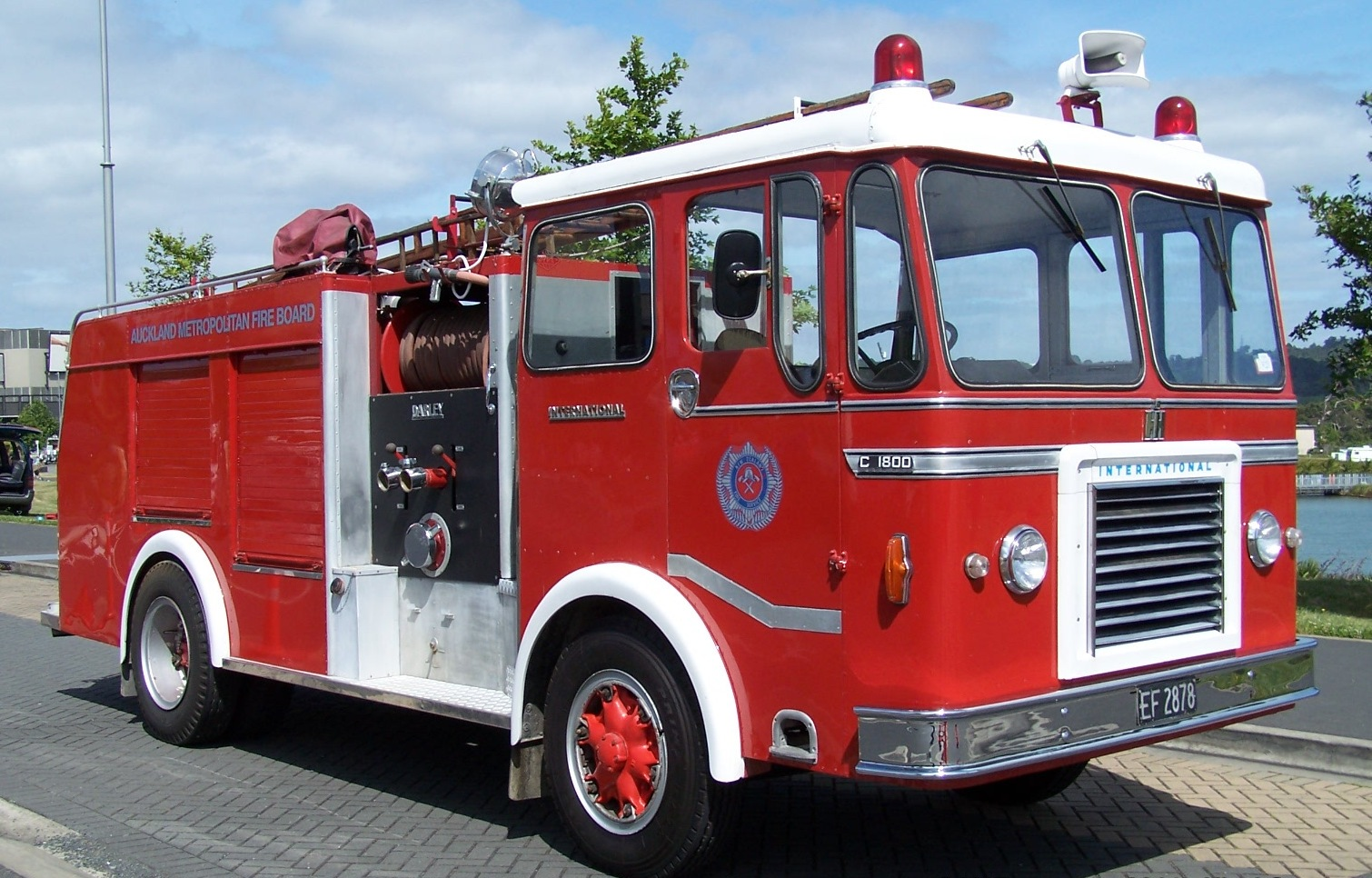
NZFS 1969 C1800 Butterbox ACCO

=== Brazilian subsidiary ===
International Harvester Máquinas S.A. was established with Brazilian government support as part of a project to develop a vehicle industry there. Their first product was the International S-184 heavy truck. In 1966 Chrysler purchased International's Brazilian plant.

== Home products ==
=== Home appliances ===
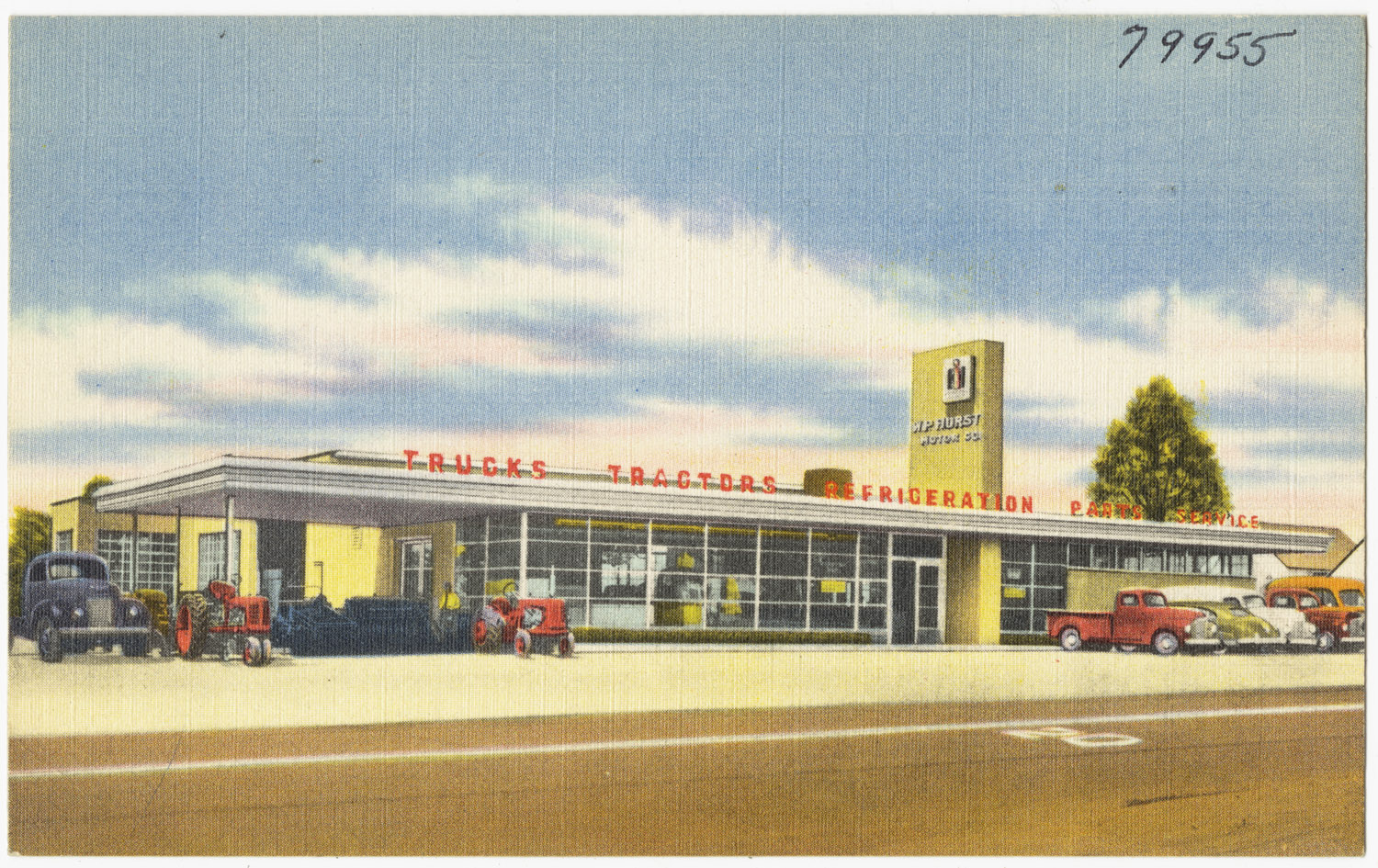
Postcard of an IH dealer in Texas, showing trucks, tractors and refrigeration equipment

Although best known for farm equipment, IH produced home appliances for farmers and nonfarmers alike. This included refrigeration equipment such as refrigerators, air conditioners, and freezers. IH had a refrigeration division of its own, as did other vehicle manufacturers of the time: Ford had Philco, Chrysler had Airtemp, General Motors had Frigidaire, Nash-Kelvinator Corporation (and then American Motors) had Kelvinator, Studebaker had the Franklin Appliance Company, and Crosley had Crosley.

The IH appliance division had originally been developed to manufacture commercial-grade items to farmers, most of whom had just received electricity by way of the many electrification projects in the U.S. before and after World War II. Among the offerings were milk coolers and walk-in freezers for produce and meat. Later on, IH courted the farmer's wife with kitchen refrigerators available in the latest designer styles. The IH spokeswoman for these products was Irma Harding, a factory trademark. These products were introduced in 1947 and sold for less than 10 years. The refrigeration division was sold to Whirlpool Corporation in 1955. Since the duration of production was short, IH appliances are rare today.

On the American sitcom Friends, the refrigerator in Monica's apartment is a circa 1950 International Harvester. Several close-ups can be seen in Season 8, Episode 17, "TOW The Tea Leaves."

=== Lawn and garden ===
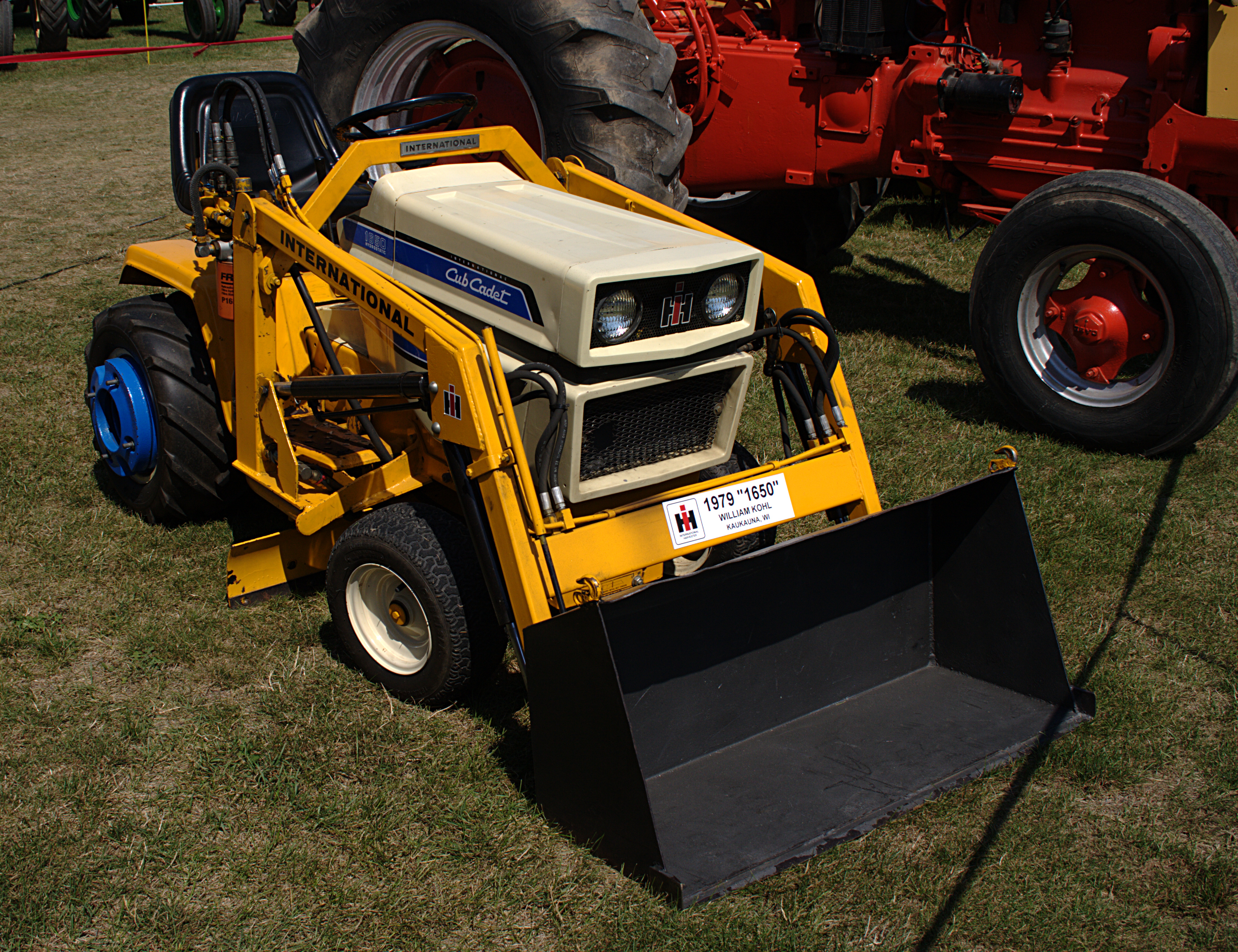
A 1979 Cub Cadet loader, made two years before the line was sold to the Modern Tool and Die Company

IH branched out into the home lawn and garden business in 1961 with its line of Cub Cadet equipment, which included riding and walk-behind lawn mowers and snow blowers. Also produced were compost shredders, rotary tillers, Cadet garden tractors, and power washers.

The Cub Cadet line was sold to MTD Products in 1981.

== Other products ==
=== Defense ===
IH manufactured light, medium, and heavy vehicles for military use. Examples include a Metro van sold to the Czechoslovak Army in 1938, M5 tractors and 2.5-ton M-5H-6 trucks for the US Navy and Marines in 1942, and around 3,500 2.5 ton M-5-6-318 cargo trucks provided mostly to the Soviet Union and China.

==== Weapons ====
In early 1951, the United States Army through the Springfield Armory contracted International Harvester to produce M1 rifles, and from 1953 to 1956 IH produced 337,623 rifles in total, according to the Army Ordnance Department.

=== HT-341 ===
In 1959, International Harvester created a jet turbine-powered tractor called the International HT-341. It was donated to the Smithsonian Institution in 1967.

== Leadership ==
=== President ===
1. Cyrus Hall McCormick, 1902–1918
2. Harold Fowler McCormick, 1918–1922
3. Alexander Legge, 1922–1929
4. Herbert F. Perkins, 1929–1931
5. Alexander Legge, 1931–1933
6. Addis E. McKinstry, 1933–1935
7. Sydney G. McAllister, 1935–1941
8. Harold Fowler McCormick Jr., 1941–1946
9. John L. McCaffrey, 1946–1956
10. Peter V. Moulder, 1956–1957
11. Frank W. Jenks, 1957–1962
12. Harry O. Bercher, 1962–1968
13. Brooks McCormick, 1968–1978
14. Archie R. McCardell, 1978–1979
15. Warren J. Hayford, 1979–1982
16. Donald D. Lennox, 1982–1984
17. Neil A. Springer, 1984

=== Chairman of the Board ===
1. Charles Deering, 1904–1918
2. Cyrus Hall McCormick, 1918–1935
3. Harold Fowler McCormick, 1935–1941
4. Judson F. Stone, 1941–1946
5. Harold Fowler McCormick Jr., 1946–1956
6. John L. McCaffrey, 1956–1968
7. Harry O. Bercher, 1968–1977
8. Brooks McCormick, 1977–1979
9. Archie R. McCardell, 1979–1982
10. Louis W. Menk, 1982–1983
11. Donald D. Lennox, 1983

== See also ==
- Farmall tractor
- Farmall Cub
- High wheeler
- International Scout
- "International Harvester" song
- List of International Harvester/Navistar engines
- List of International Harvester vehicles
- Lee Klancher
- Harvester Homecoming
