= International Fleetstar =

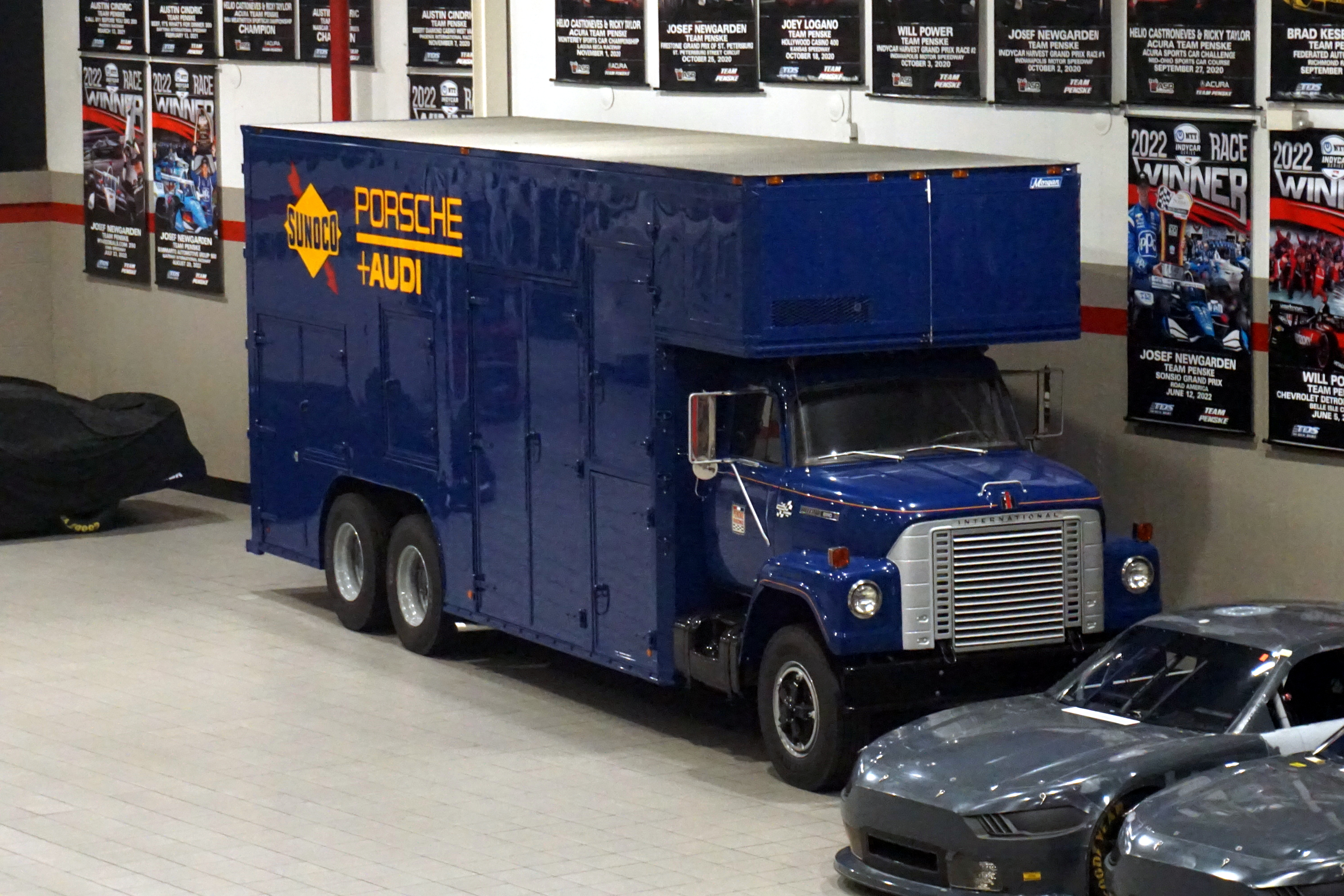
- 1972 International Fleetstar truck at Team Penske

Overview
- Type: Truck
- Manufacturer: International Harvester
- Production: 1962-1977

Body and chassis
- Class: Class 7-8
- Layout: 4x2 6x4

Powertrain
- Engine: International V8, International DT466, International DT190, Caterpillar 3208, Cummins, Detroit Diesel, International DV550/DV550B

Chronology
- Predecessor: International R-Series medium-duty
- Successor: International S-Series

The International Fleetstar is a series of heavy-duty trucks that was produced between 1962 and 1977 by International Harvester. Slotted above the Loadstar and below the Paystar and Transtar conventionals introduced after it, the Fleetstar was the first truck line that International designed specifically for vocational use.

Using a conventional-cab configuration, the Fleetstar was available as both a straight truck and as a semitractor, with both single and tandem rear axles.

In 1977, International Harvester introduced the S-Series. Consolidating the Fleetstar and Loadstar within a single model range, the S-Series replaced the Fleetstar first. The contemporary equivalent of the Fleetstar produced by International is the HV (WorkStar).

== Models ==
1900

2000

2010

2010A

2050

2070

2100

These models of trucks were produced in 27,500 lb (12,500 kg) to 60,920 lb (27,630 kg) Gross Vehicle Weight Ratings (the loaded weight of the truck), with both single and tandem rear axle models. The Fleetstar line was larger than the Loadstar (International's medium duty lineup during this time) and smaller than the Paystar (severe service) and Transtar (primarily semi-tractors). Fleetstars used the "C" series cab popular on the Loadstar and pickups, and later on got the newer "D" series cab, with some overlap between the two models. There were Cummins, Detroit Diesel, and International Harvester built engines available in larger sizes than those of the Loadstar line. Frame rail and axle sizes were generally larger than their smaller cousin, and were of the completely straight design for strength. These frames were typical of International truck frames in general, having large flanges, and great strength.

These were simple and straightforward trucks with stubby noses and short turning radius. Their name is correct in that many were purchased as fleet trucks, and usually lacked the flash and comfort of the more custom Transtar series. These trucks were reliable, easily fixed and maintained, and offered a low cost heavy truck for those looking in this market area. The construction and heavy duty market also got its version of the Fleetstar with a special Construction package, but these were eclipsed by the smaller Loadstar and larger Paystar series of trucks. Many older Fleetstar trucks got a second lease on life after over the road trucking by being converted to everything from stake beds to van bodies to dump trucks. Quite a few examples are around with over 1 million miles on the odometer.

== Chassis ==
All Fleetstars had ladder frames with the same three standard wheelbases, which increased slightly over the years. The exception was early model tandems, which shared their separate wheelbases. All models were available as semi-tractors, gasoline models had a Gross Combination Weight Rating (the loaded weight of the truck and any trailers) of 55,000 lb (25,000 kg) and diesel models had a 79,000 lb (36,000 kg) rating.

1972-1974 Models

Model	Max. front GAWR (Note: Gross Axle Weight Rating is the loaded weight of the axle.)	Max. rear GAWR	Max. GVWR (Note: Gross Vehicle Weight Rating is the loaded weight of the truck.)	Engine (Note: Highest rated engine for model.)	Trans
1910	12,000 lb (5,400 kg)	22,000 lb (10,000 kg)	33,560 lb (15,220 kg)	RD-406	5 spd.
2000D	12,000 lb (5,400 kg)	23,000 lb (10,000 kg)	35,000 lb (16,000 kg)	NTC 270	15 spd.
2010	12,000 lb (5,400 kg)	23,000 lb (10,000 kg)	33,560 lb (15,220 kg)	VS-478	15 spd.
2050	11,560 lb (5,240 kg)	23,000 lb (10,000 kg)	33,560 lb (15,220 kg)	D-170	5 spd.
2070	12,000 lb (5,400 kg)	23,000 lb (10,000 kg)	34,560 lb (15,680 kg)	NTC 335	13 spd.
F1910 (Note: F models have a tandem axle.)	12,000 lb (5,400 kg)	34,000 lb (15,000 kg)	46,000 lb (21,000 kg)	RD-406	5 spd.
F2000D	11,560 lb (5,240 kg)	38,000 lb (17,000 kg)	49,560 lb (22,480 kg)	NTC 270	13 spd.
F2010	16,000 lb (7,300 kg)	38,000 lb (17,000 kg)	54,000 lb (24,000 kg)	VS-478	5 spd.
F2070	18,000 lb (8,200 kg)	44,000 lb (20,000 kg)	60,920 lb (27,630 kg)	NTC 335	13 spd.

== Powertrain ==
The Fleetstar series offered a wide range of engines. Most models offered several gasoline engines and a mid-range diesel. 2000 and 2070 models had heavy duty diesels.

Most Fleetstars had five speed transmissions, often with a two speed rear axle, but a six speed automatic was sometimes an option. Heavy duty diesels had vendor transmissions with up to 13 speeds.

Engines (Highest rated in different truck models.)

Engine Model (Note: Engines are International (IHC) or Cummins.)	Configuration	Fuel type (Note: Gasoline (G), diesel (D), inline (I), (V), and number of cylinders.)	Power	Torque
IHC RD-406	406 cu in (6.7 L) inline-six	Gasoline	193 hp (144 kW)	373 lb⋅in (42.1 N⋅m)
IHC VS-478	477 cu in (7.8 L) inline-six	Gasoline	209 hp (156 kW)	384 lb⋅in (43.4 N⋅m)
IHC D-170	549 cu in (9.0 L) V8	Diesel	170 hp (130 kW)	340 lb⋅in (38 N⋅m)
Cummins NTC-335	855 cu in (14.0 L) inline-six	Diesel	335 hp (250 kW)	

== Notes ==
- The F2070 Configuration of the International Fleetstar appears in the game SnowRunner, as a heavy-duty vehicle.
