= International Metro Van =

International Metro, Metro Van, Metro Mite, Metro-Lite, Metro Walk-in Cab
- A restored Metro Van in 2026

Overview
- Manufacturer: International Harvester
- Also called: Metro
- Production: 1938–1975
- Assembly: United States
- Designer: Raymond Loewy

Body and chassis
- Class: Light-duty Van or Coach (bus), Class 1-3; Medium-duty van or truck, Class 4-6
- Body style: Van MPV or COE truck
- Layout: R.W.D. C.O.E.
- Related: D-series truck

Chronology
- Successor: MetroStar, eStar

The International Metro Van was a multi-stop truck manufactured by International Harvester. This vehicle was one of the earlier, mass-produced forward control vehicles, once commonly used for milk or bakery delivery, as well as ambulance services, mobile offices, and radio transmitter vans. Typically, they were 1/2-, 3/4-, or 1-ton panel trucks that allowed the driver to stand or sit while driving the vehicle.

Variations included a passenger bus called a Metro Coach, a Metro partial cab-chassis with front-end sections (for end-user customization), and a cab-over truck called a "walk-in cab". The truck (also called a chassis cab) variation could be configured with a separate box or container for cargo transport or left open to be fitted with other equipment such as a compactor for a garbage truck or a stake bed.

== History ==
The International Harvester Metro Van was produced in the United States from 1938 until 1975 and sold internationally. The drive train was originally based on the 1937-40 D-Series trucks. One of the first models built was sold to the Czechoslovak Army and destroyed by the German army during World War II. During the conflict, the United States Armed Forces would use the vehicle for several roles, including as ambulances and personnel transport.

Unlike their trucks and other vehicles, the Metro bodies were built by the Metropolitan Body Company on Grand Street in Bridgeport, Connecticut, a company that International Harvester would later purchase in 1948. Final assembly was then done in one of the IH manufacturing plants. The original design was by Raymond Loewy of Studebaker and Coke bottle fame. The Metro design was one of several with which Loewy was involved or created during his association with International Harvester.

The overall design of the Metro vans remained somewhat unchanged from 1938 until 1964 when it was redesigned by the in-house design team in the Chicago Metro plant to be competitive with the Boyertown and Hackney vans. The corners were squared and an opening hood was added for easier access to coolant and oil dipstick. An eight-cylinder engine was also made available.

In the 1950s, International Harvester began producing variations such as the "Metro-Lite," and "Metro-Multi-Stop" vans. In 1959, the "Metro Mite" was introduced. It was based on the Scout drive train, and using the Nash Metropolitan engine, it would inspire vehicles like the Jeep FJ and the Studebaker Zip Van. This version proved to be underpowered and in 1961 International's own, new, 4-cylinder engine was substituted In 1960 the "Bookmobile" was built by the Metropolitan Body Company on an IHC chassis. By 1972, all IHC Metro Vans were stripped-chassis that other manufacturers could build on. After 1975 they were discontinued along with all other light-duty trucks except for the Scout, which was last made in 1980.

The Metro Van was re-issued by Navistar in 2000, as a medium-sized delivery truck. Other than by model name, it is unrelated to the original Metro line.

In 2005, Navistar purchased the Workhorse Group, a manufacturer of step-van and motor home chassis, to seemingly re-enter the delivery van market. For a short time Workhorse offered an integrated chassis-body product, similar in nature to the original International Harvester van, called the MetroStar. In September 2012, Navistar announced the discontinuation of Workhorse and the closure of the plant in Union City, Indiana.

== Metropolitan Body Company ==
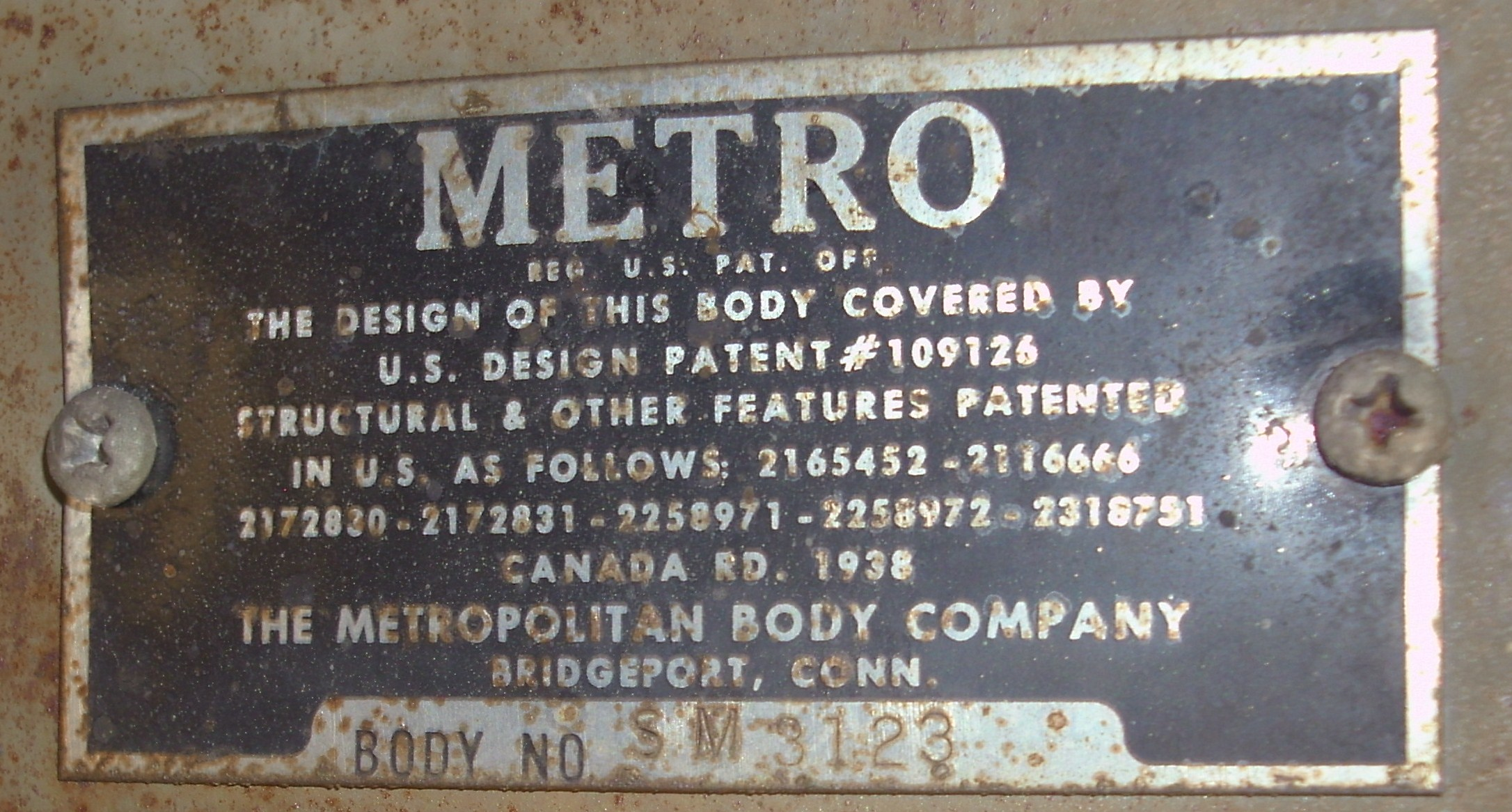
Metropolitan Body Co. manufacturer plate located next to IHC build plate above passenger side front window

With the introduction of the Metro Van body in 1937, a new manufacturing facility opened at 151 Kossuth Street in Bridgeport, Connecticut. All Metro Van bodies through its closing in the early 1970s were built in the Kossuth Street facility. Metro Van bodies were sold for all major truck builder platforms until 1947, when it started producing exclusively for International Harvester as it switched back to commercial production from building gun turrets and bomb blast shields for the war effort. MBC became a wholly owned subsidiary of International Harvester in January, 1948.

During the late 1930s MBC were pioneers in the development of cab over engine (COE) route delivery bodies. MBC had an extensive patent protected line of utility cabs, beds, and bodies with unique functional aspects that likely contributed to International Harvester Company's position as an innovator and market leader in the commercial truck industry in the latter half of the 20th century.

== Original Loewy design distinction ==
D-M (D Series Metro)
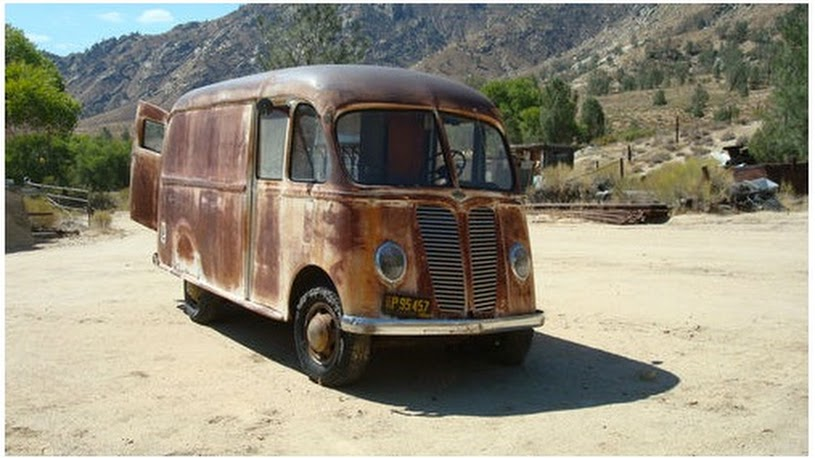
- 1941 D15M Metro Van

Overview
- Manufacturer: Metropolitan Body Co. & International Harvester
- Model years: 1938–1940
- Designer: Raymond Loewy

Body and chassis
- Class: Van
- Body style: MPV
- Layout: RWD COE

Powertrain
- Engine: I6
- Transmission: Manual

Chronology
- Successor: K Series

The initial model of the Metro series was the version that adhered closest to the original Loewy design. Known as the "D" or "D-M" series these vans had several unique features that were later dropped for as yet unknown reasons. Some of these features included teardrop shaped headlights (similar to those found on 1937 & '38 Ford coupes and sedans), rear fender skirts (coverings) with deco styled "Metro" badges, "triple diamond" IHC grill emblem, and a more streamlined front end configuration lacking the more angular design of later Metros. This original road vehicle design is sometimes referred as the "giant scarab" which is consistent with the Egyptian influences of the Art Deco movement. A review of Loewy's other designs for items such as streamlined locomotives shows his interest in wind-cheating "swept back" contours.

Unrestored example of the original Loewy Metro design

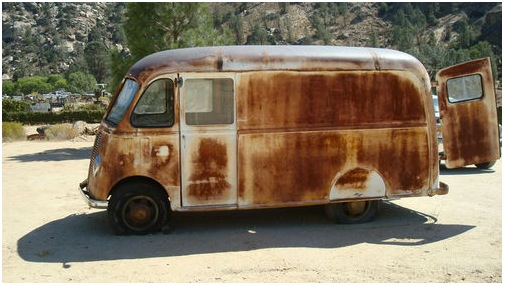
Driver side view

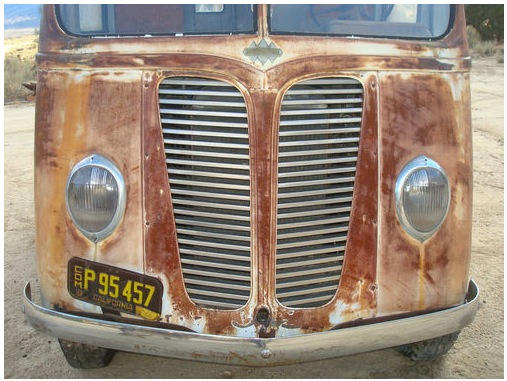
Front end with grill, emblem, and teardrop headlights

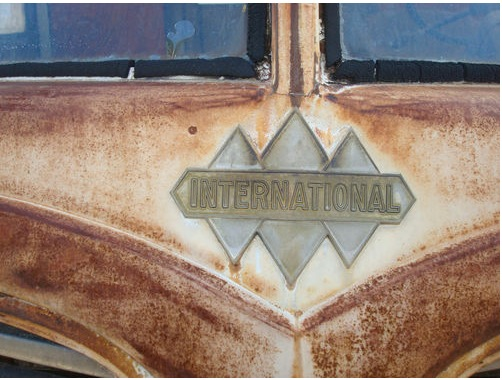
Triple diamond front emblem

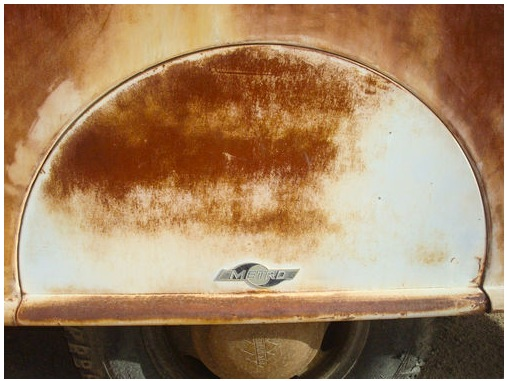
Rear wheel side skirt with Art-Deco style emblem unique to this series

== Model series ==
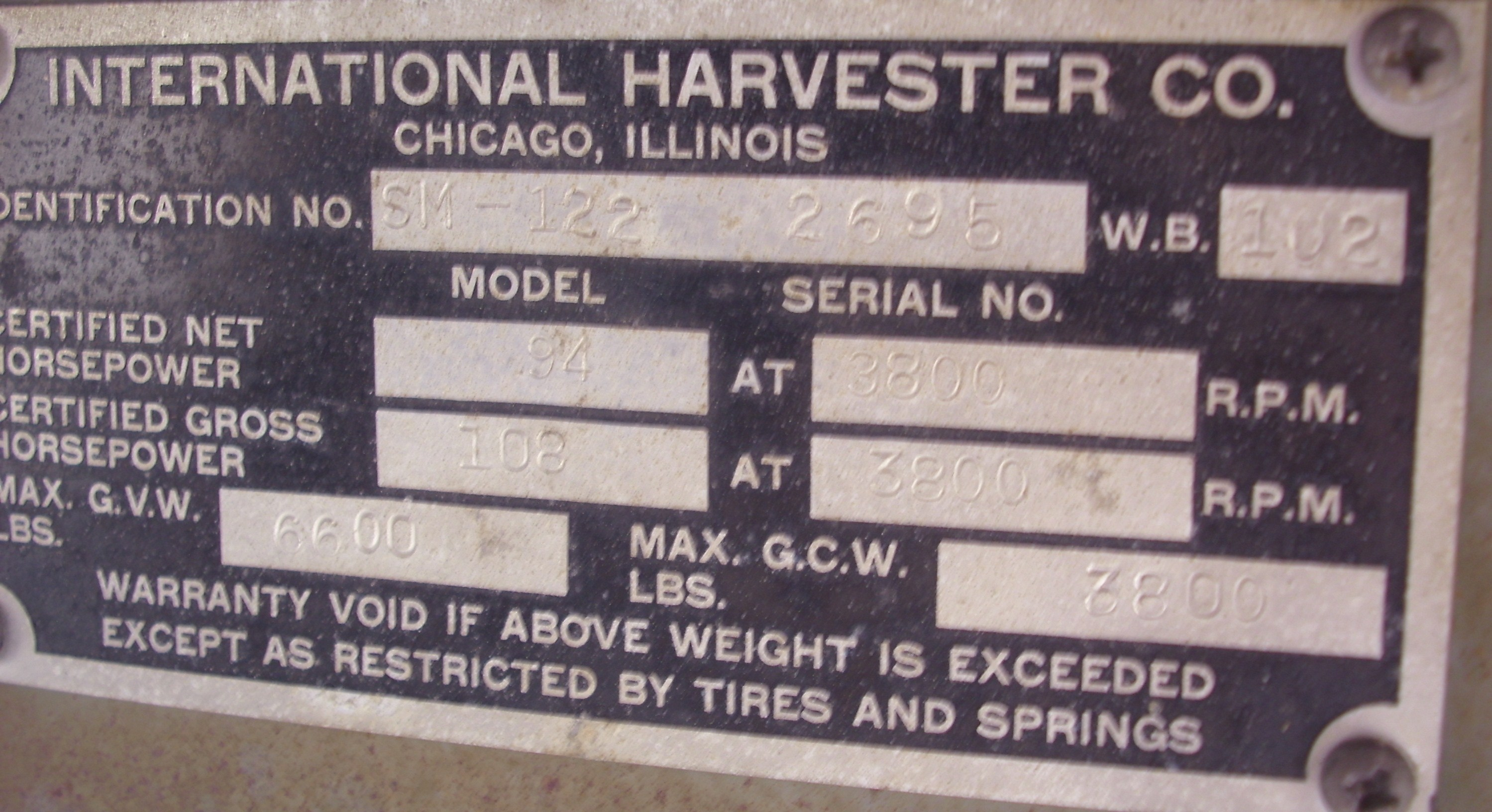
IHC Metro build plate, located above passenger side front window

The powertrain of the Metro vans was typically based on an equivalent series International light- or medium-duty truck. For example, an LM-120 1/2 ton Metro van (5,400 lb weight capacity or GVWR) with a 7 3/4 or 9 1/2 foot body effectively had the IH engine (SD-220), transmission, rearend, wheels (although with varying bolt patterns), and braking system of an L-120 pickup truck. With the introduction of each new series of truck, updated Metro vans were included as part of their commercial line.

Metro model designations can be difficult to decode considering that the differently configured vehicles could have the same model number. For example, in reference to the LM-120 mentioned previously it was available in several different wheelbase and body lengths yet its GVWR (5,400 lbs) remained the same. Each series has unique models and configurations that may have common features or functions across the series.

Model numbers were typically coded into the VIN number along with the chassis serial number (a.k.a. "build number", its position in the production sequence) and any other special identifying code(s).

The suffix number (i.e. "120" of "LM-120") would typically refer to the weight class (GVWR) of the vehicle. As the suffix number increased, so did the designated carrying capacity. In some instances, this number was also used to designate the weight capacity along of a certain model vehicle with particular features or functions.

KM/KBM (K Series Metro)

Overview
- Manufacturer: Metropolitan Body Co. & International Harvester
- Model years: 1941–1942, WW2 shutdown, 1946–1949
- Designer: Raymond Loewy

Body and chassis
- Class: Van
- Body style: MPV
- Layout: RWD COE
- Related: IH K/KB-series

Powertrain
- Engine: I6
- Transmission: Manual

Chronology
- Successor: LM Series

== Gallery ==
Restored example of 1960 IH Metro

3/4 view 1960 Metro

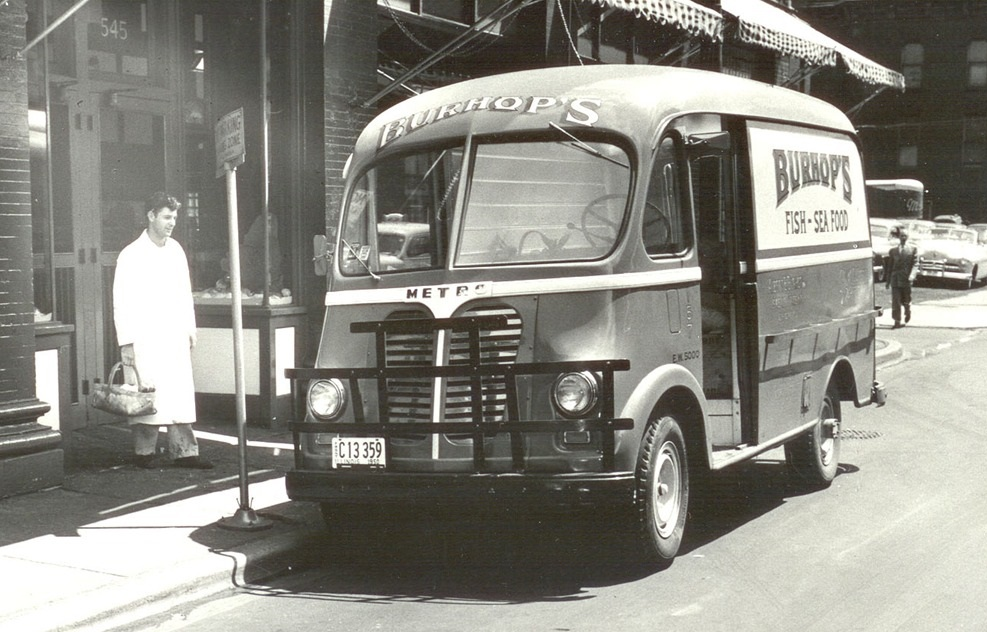
1950 LM-series Metro Van

1960 Metro front

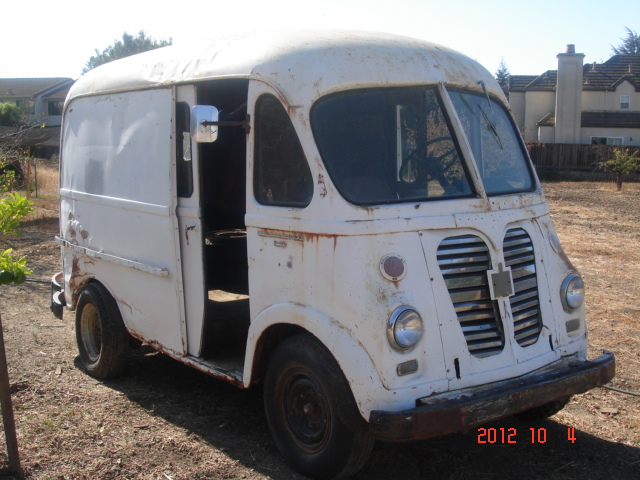
Unrestored 1957 S-series Metro van, 7 1/2 ft body (shorty)

1960 International Harvester Metro Richmond Virginia rear

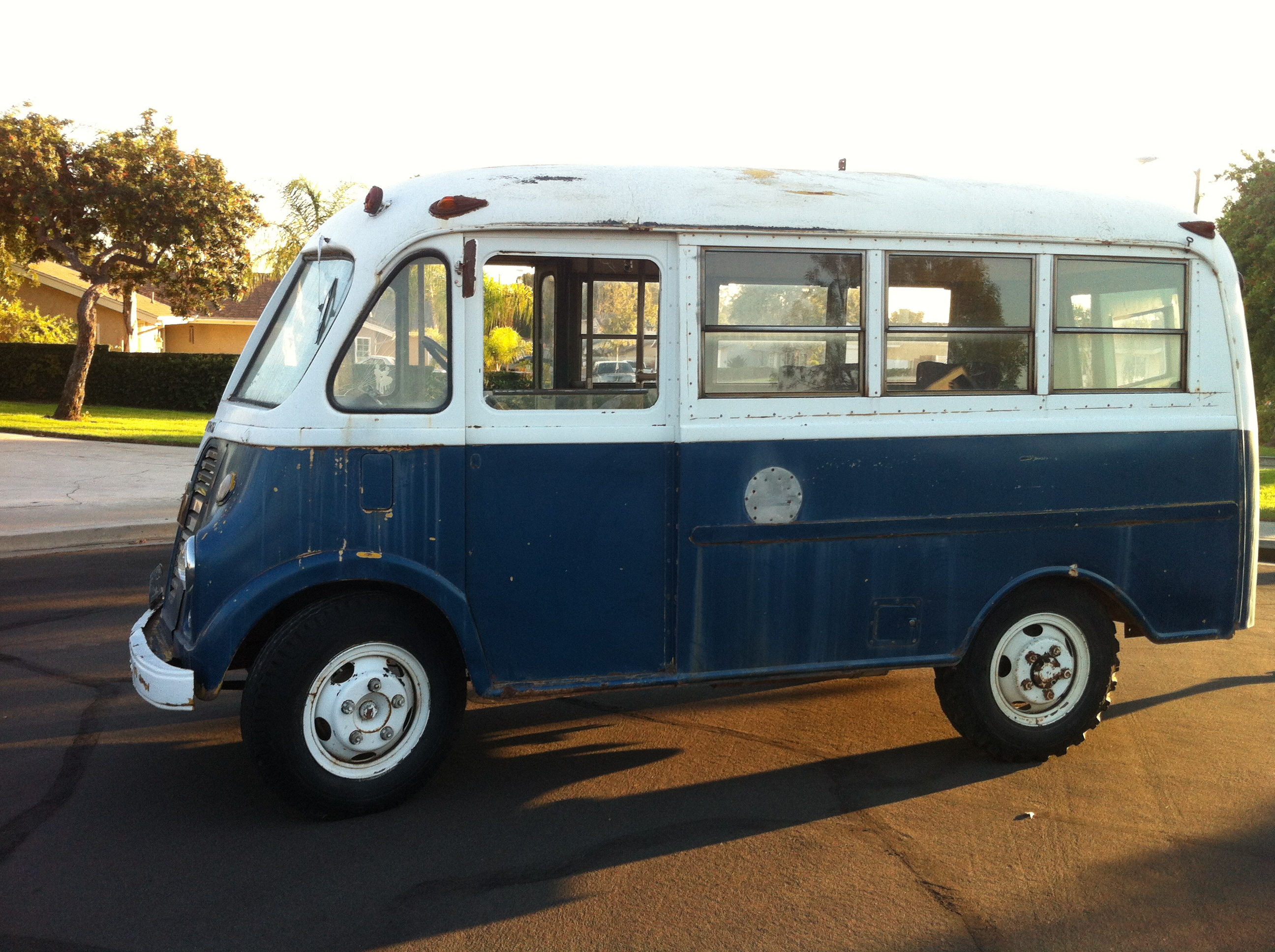
Original 1960–62 A series Metro Coach (bus)

1960 Metro Nose

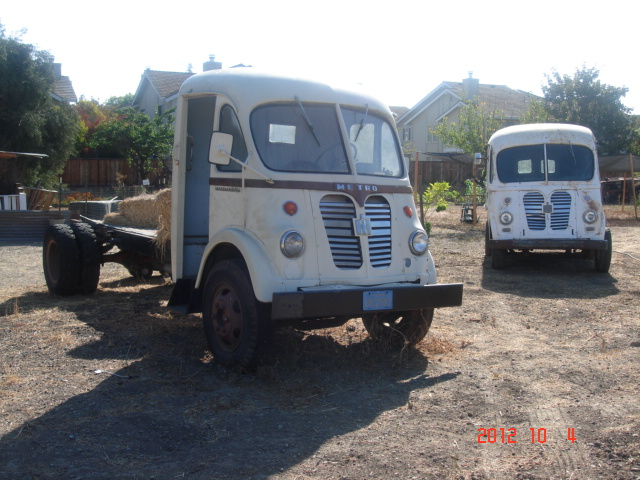
Unrestored (left) 1961 A-series Walk-in Cab truck, (right) 1957 S-series van

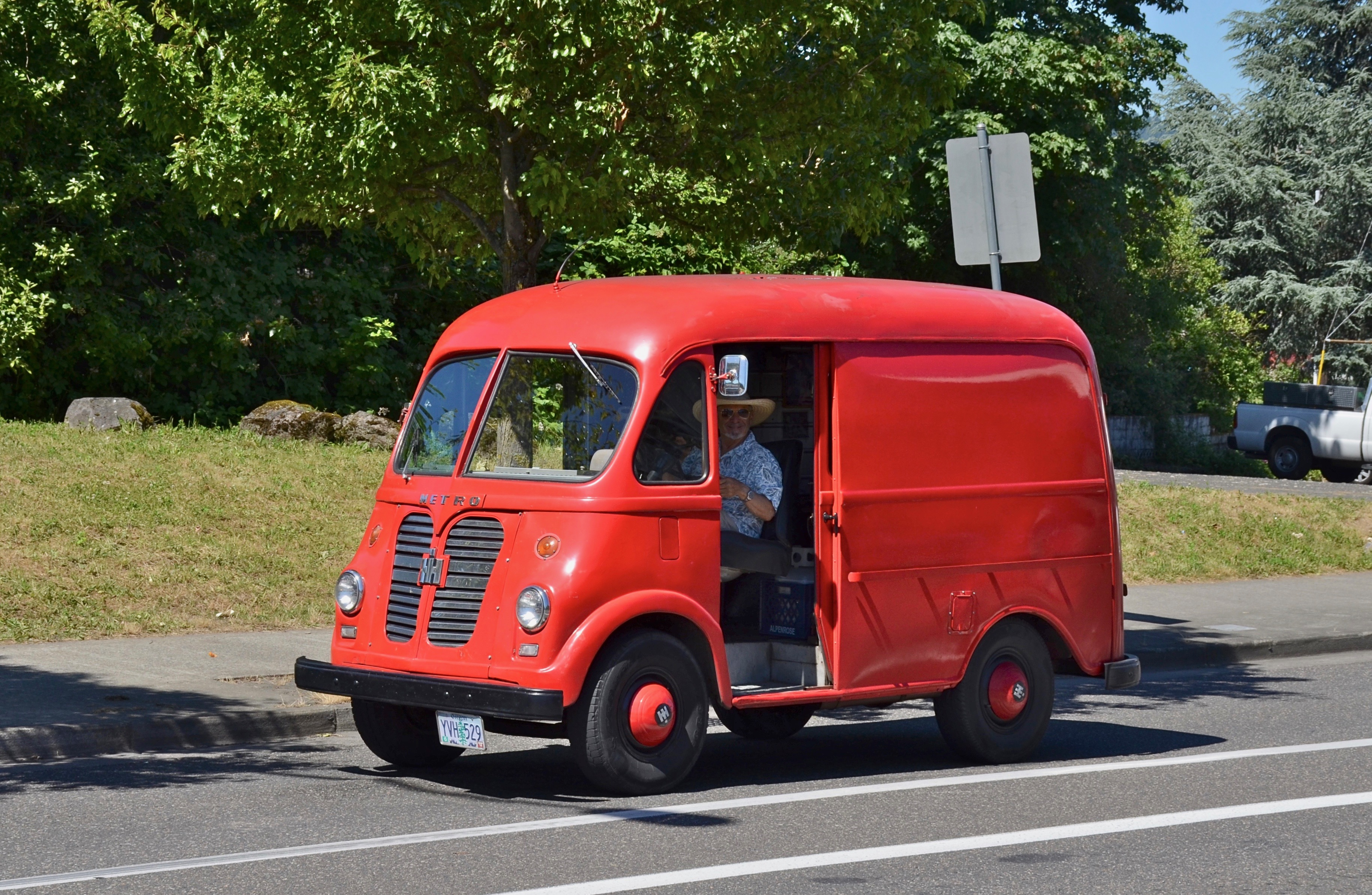
Preserved IH Metro Van Shorty in Portland in 2015

LM (L Series Metro)

Overview
- Also called: LM-120, LM-121, LM-122, LM-150, LM-151, LM-152
- Model years: 1950–1952
- Designer: Raymond Loewy

Body and chassis
- Class: Van
- Body style: MPV
- Layout: RWD COE
- Related: IH L-series

Powertrain
- Engine: 6 cylinder Inline
- Transmission: Manual

Chronology
- Predecessor: KM/KBM series
- Successor: RM series

RM (R Series Metro)

Overview
- Model years: 1953–1955
- Designer: Raymond Loewy

Body and chassis
- Class: Van
- Body style: MPV
- Layout: RWD COE
- Related: IH R-series

Powertrain
- Engine: 6 cylinder Inline
- Transmission: Manual

SM (S Series Metro)

Overview
- Model years: 1956–1958
- Designer: Raymond Loewy

Body and chassis
- Class: Van
- Body style: MPV
- Layout: RWD COE
- Related: IH S-series

Powertrain
- Engine: 6 cylinder Inline
- Transmission: Manual

AM (A Series Metro), Metro • Walk-In Cab

Overview
- Also called: AM-80, AM-120, AM-130, AM-150, AMC-150, AM-160, AMC-160
- Model years: 1959–1961

Body and chassis
- Related: International A series

BM/CM-Series

Overview
- Model years: 1962–1972

Body and chassis
- Body style: Box, new design

== See also ==
- International Harvester
- Multi-stop truck
- List of International Harvester vehicles
