= International R series =

International R-series
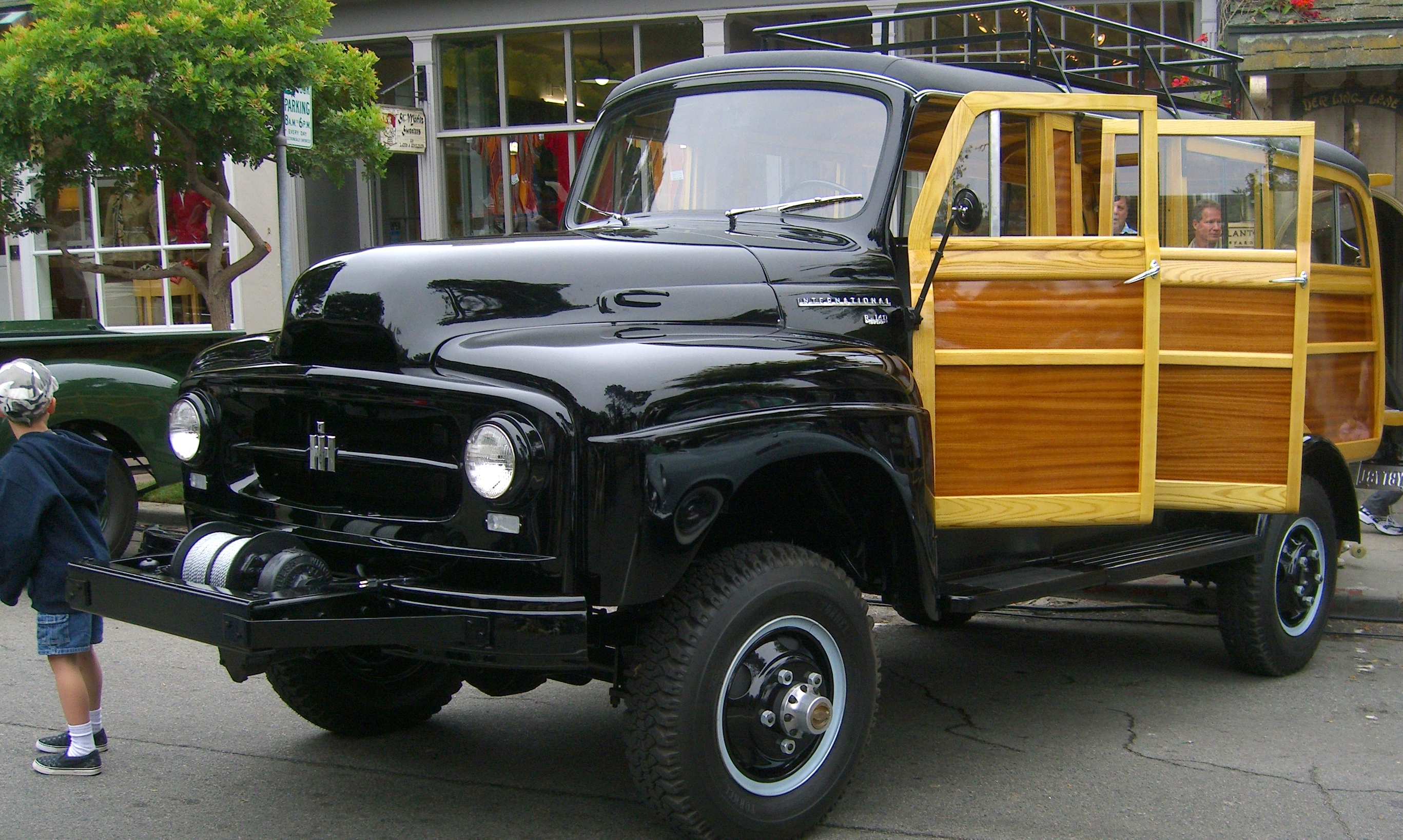
- 1954 International R-140 4x4 station wagon (1 of 3 made)

Overview
- Manufacturer: International Harvester
- Also called: International 210/230 (1965-1972)
- Production: 1953-1955 (light-medium trucks); 1953-1972 (heavy trucks)
- Assembly: Fort Wayne, Indiana; Springfield, Ohio; Emeryville, California; Bridgeport, Connecticut; Chatham, Ontario, Canada

Body and chassis
- Body style: Pickup truck Delivery van Chassis cab Conventional; Cabover (COE)
- Related: International S-series (1955); International V-series; International M-series

Chronology
- Predecessor: International L series
- Successor: International S series (1955); International A series (Light truck); International Loadstar; International Fleetstar; International Paystar

The International R series is a model range of trucks that was manufactured by International Harvester. Introduced in 1953 as a further development of the International L series, the model line marked the introduction of the IH "tractor" grille emblem on International road vehicles. Sharing a cab with its predecessor, the R-series marked the introduction of four-wheel drive vehicles and the wider use of diesel engines.

Ranging from light-duty pickup trucks to tandem-axle semitractors, the series was produced across a wide variety of applications and design configurations.

During 1955, light and medium-duty versions of the model line were renamed the S-series. Heavy-duty vehicles remained in production into the 1960s (under multiple model designations), ultimately replaced in 1972 by the Paystar line.

== Model overview ==
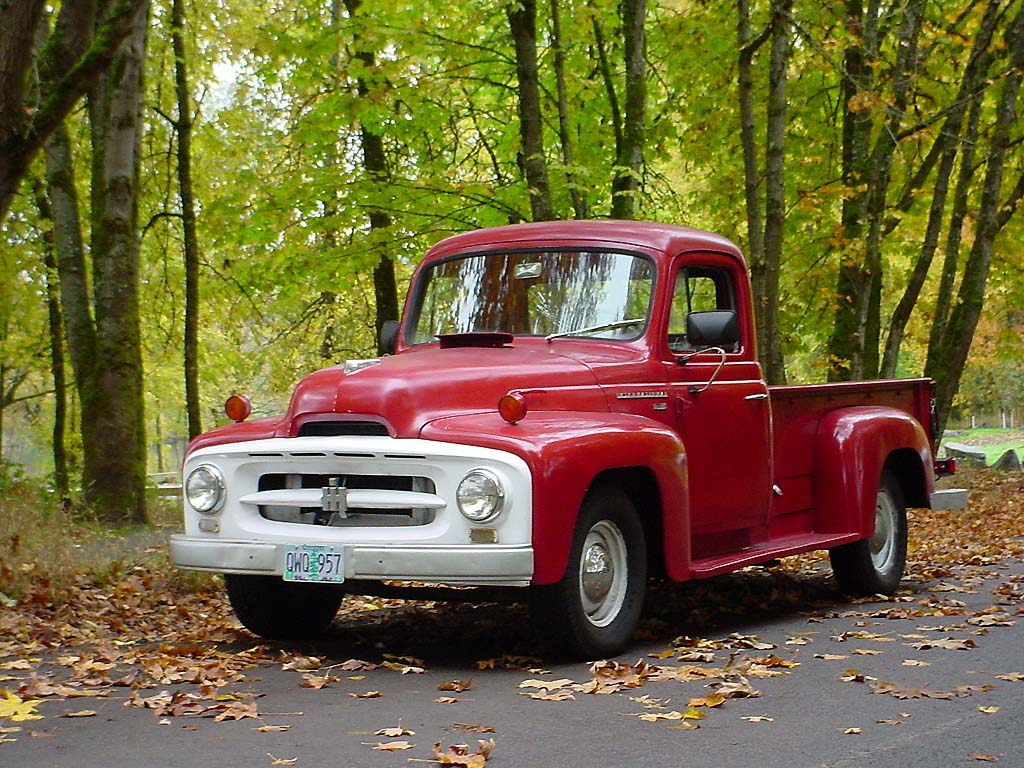
1955 International R-130 pickup truck

=== Light duty ===
Including the R-110 through R-130 model lines, the light-duty trucks included pickup trucks, panel trucks, and chassis-cab vehicles (R-130). In the transition to the R-series, the grille design was simplified with a body-color grille receiving two large horizontal slots.

Produced in 115 and 127-inch wheelbases, International pickup trucks (R-110 through R-130 series) were powered by a Silver Diamond 220 inline-6 engine; mated to a 3-speed manual transmission, the engine produced 100 hp. For 1954, the R-100 was introduced. Priced $60 less than the R-110, the new model line received different brakes and suspension tuning; the SD-220 was retuned for 104 hp output. As an option, International introduced both an overdrive manual transmission and a 3-speed automatic transmission (a version of the GM Hydramatic); another option included power steering.

While sharing much of its body with its initial 1930s design, the Metro van followed the design of International light trucks, adopting the powertrain of the R-series pickups. Derived from the R-series panel truck, in 1953, International introduced the International Travellall truck-based station wagon (a forerunner of the full-size SUV).

=== Medium duty ===
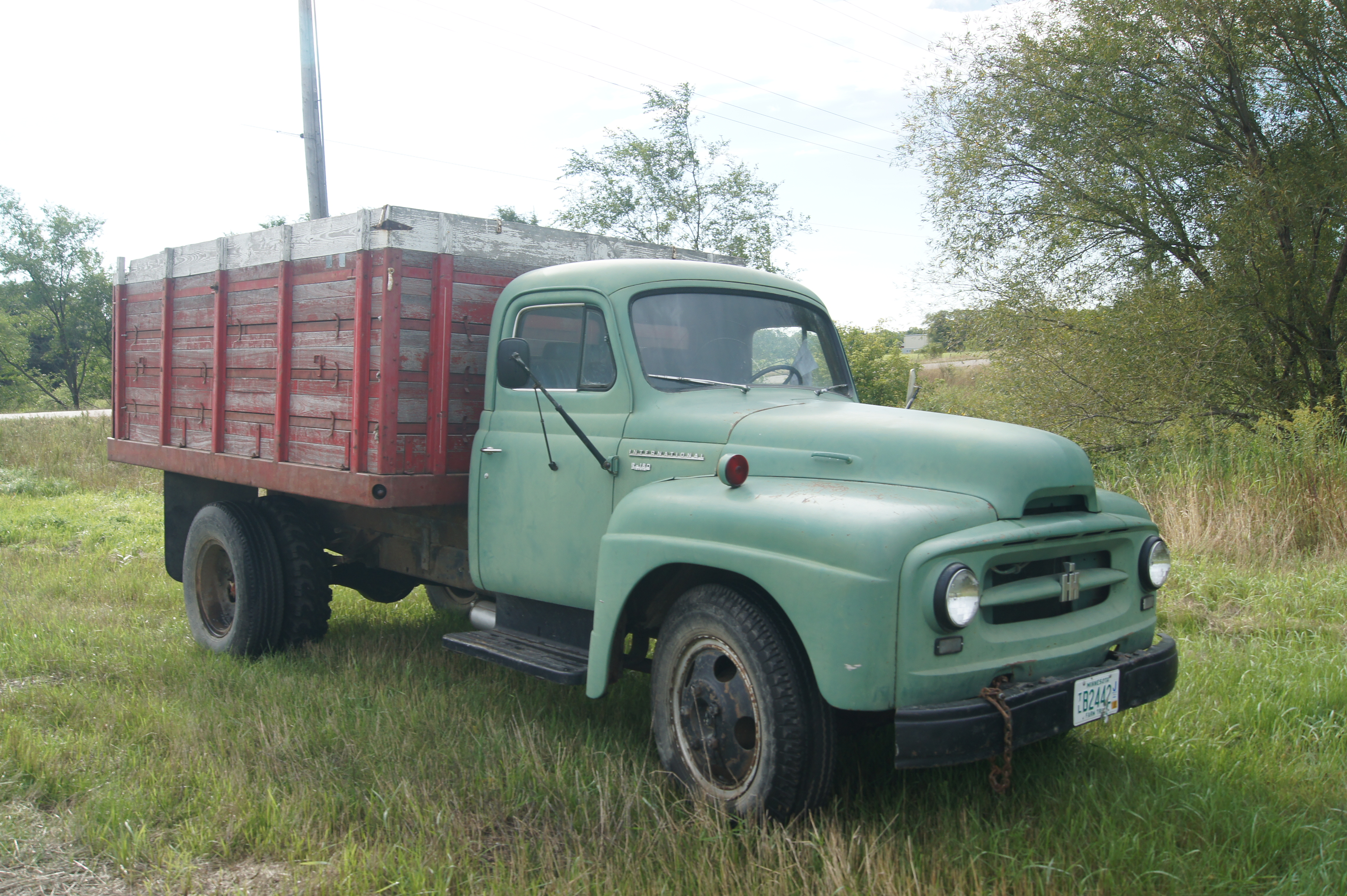
International R-160 stake-bed truck

Including the R-140 through R-180 model lines, the medium-duty trucks were produced as chassis-cab conventional trucks. The medium-duty trucks also served as the basis for the "Schoolmaster" cowled bus chassis. The Loadstar made its return, denoting high-capacity versions of each model family. For 1953, International introduced factory-produced four-wheel drive trucks for the first time (in the R-140 and R-160 series); previous 4x4 trucks were conversions (by either International or second-party manufacturers).

The medium-duty trucks were powered by multiple engines, dependent on model series. The R-140 and R-150 shared the SD-220 with the light-duty trucks, while the R-160 was powered by a 108 hp SD-240 I6. The R-170 retained the Super Blue Diamond 269 from the L-series, producing 101 hp; a 130 hp Super Black Diamond 282 I6 (standard in the R-180) was offered as an option.

The medium-duty R-Series (R-160 through R-180, along with R-190 and R-200 heavy-duty) chassis served as the basis for the Fageol van, a bus-style delivery van assembled by Twin Coach.

=== Heavy duty ===
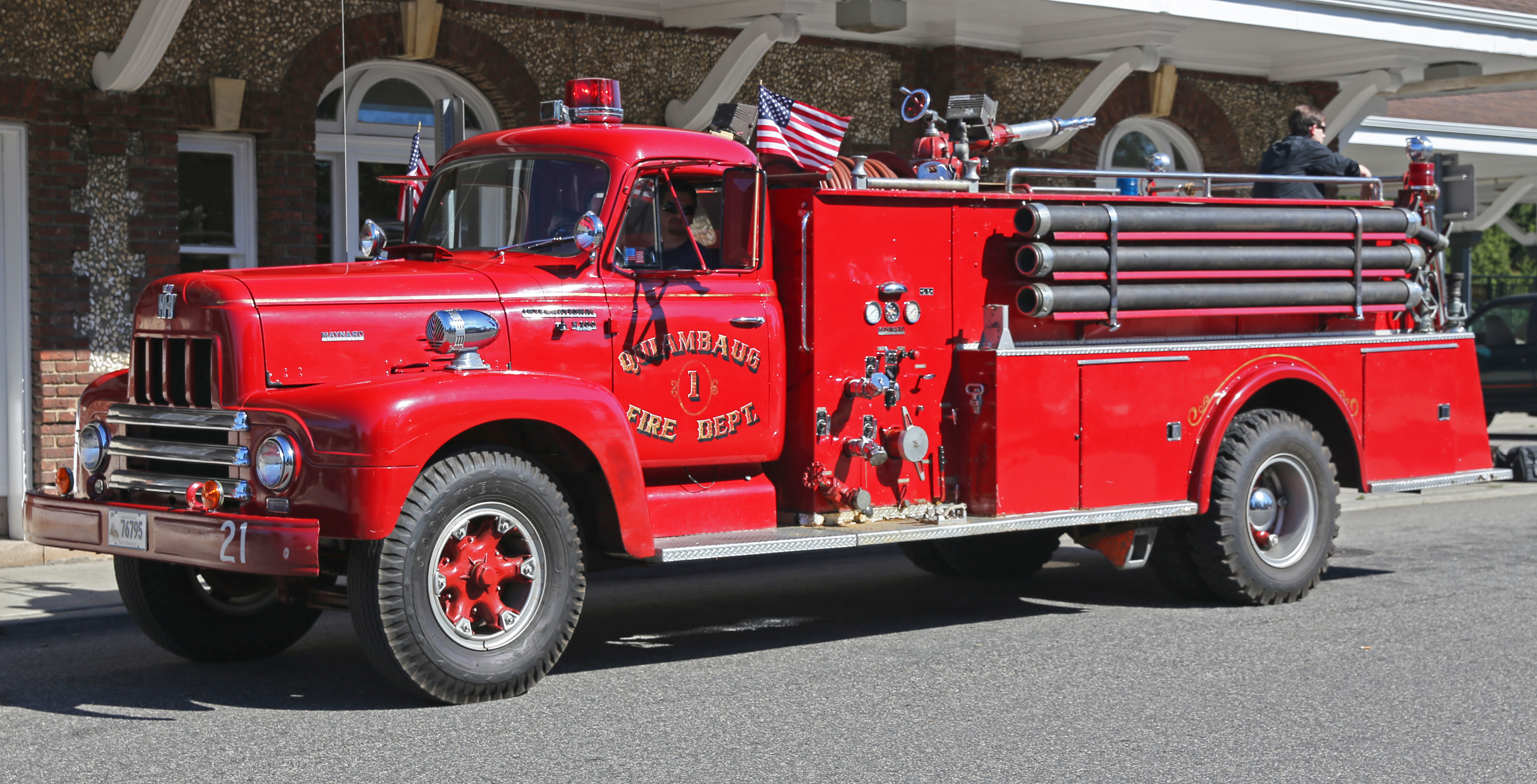
1961 International R-200 fire truck

The heavy-duty R-series range included multiple model families developed for multiple applications. Alongside the standard conventional (R-190, R-200, R-210, R-220), a "D" denoted models with diesel engines and an "F" denoted tandem rear axles; an "H" was used for heavy-duty models. Other R-series models were developed primarily for heavy-duty applications, including the R-306 (developed for fire trucks), and the long-nose RD-305/405 (to fit Cummins diesel engines). An "RC/RDC/RDFC" model family was a COE, derived from conventional-cab trucks.

The R-series served as the basis for other model ranges, including the V-series; introduced in 1956, the V-series was developed to accommodate the introduction of V8 engines from International, receiving a slightly restyled hood and redesigned grille.

Following the introduction of the S-series, the heavy-duty R-series underwent several model revisions. After becoming part of the S-series, the R-series COE was replaced by the DCO-400 "Emeryville" tilt-cab COE in 1957. In 1960, International began to consolidate several heavy-duty models of the R-series and V-series, creating the construction-oriented F-series; the 1962 introduction of the Fleetstar short-hood conventional also was phased in as a replacement for multiple models of the R-series. In 1965, the construction trucks dropped a letter prefix, becoming the 210/230 series; the model line was produced through 1972, when it was replaced by the Paystar.

== S-series (1955-1957) ==
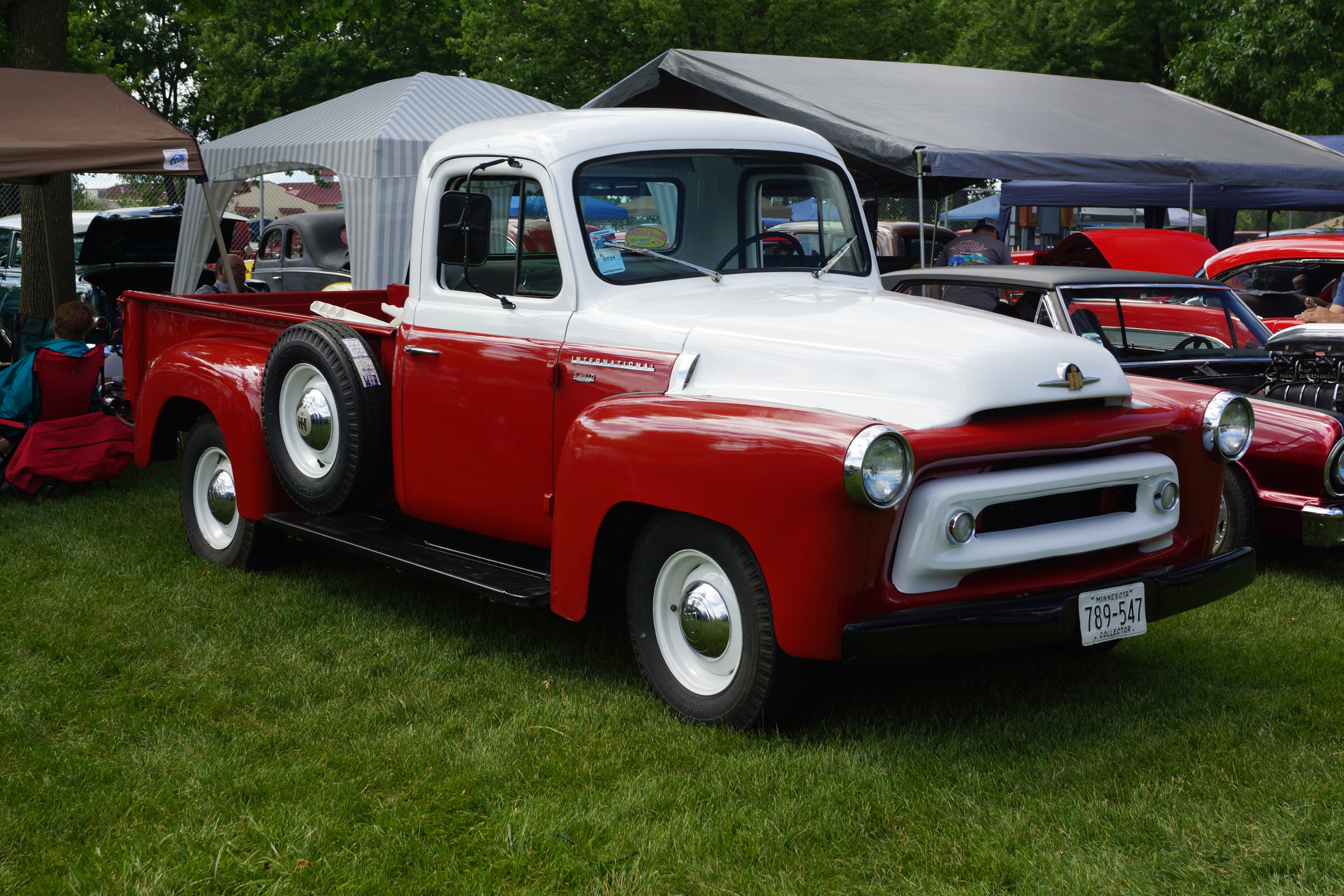
1956 International S-110

For 1955, International replaced the R-series light and medium-duty trucks with the S-series, ranging from the S-110 to the S-184 truck. The model line also included the Schoolmaster bus chassis, Travelall wagon, and Metro delivery van. Distinguished by a redesign to the front fascia, the S-series marked the introduction of four-wheel drive to light-duty vehicles.

During 1957, the S-series was replaced by the completely new A-series, forming the basis for International light trucks through 1968. The front sheetmetal of the S-series was adopted by the International Metro (used by its hooded Metroette variant) through 1962. The S-184 continued production in Brazil until 1966 (when Chrysler purchased the Brazilian subsidiary of International Harvester).

For 1978 production, International revived the S-series name, using it on the medium-duty replacement for both the Loadstar and Fleetstar; the final model line designed by International Harvester, the S-series would be produced in various forms into the 21st century.

== Production output ==
Production figures for 1953 were 123,026 (77,817 trucks built at Springfield, 38,613 at Fort Wayne, 626 at Emeryville and 5,970 at Bridgeport), plus another 13,912 trucks built at Chatham, Canada, for a grand total of 136,938.

In 1954, the production totalled 105,463 units (Fort Wayne built 33,637, Emeryville handled 680, Bridgeport produced 7,041, while Canadian Chatham plant churned out 7,073 units).

The biggest seller during the 1954-55 period was the R-110 model, with 72,659 built.

== See also ==
- List of International Harvester vehicles
