= International Paystar =

International PayStar
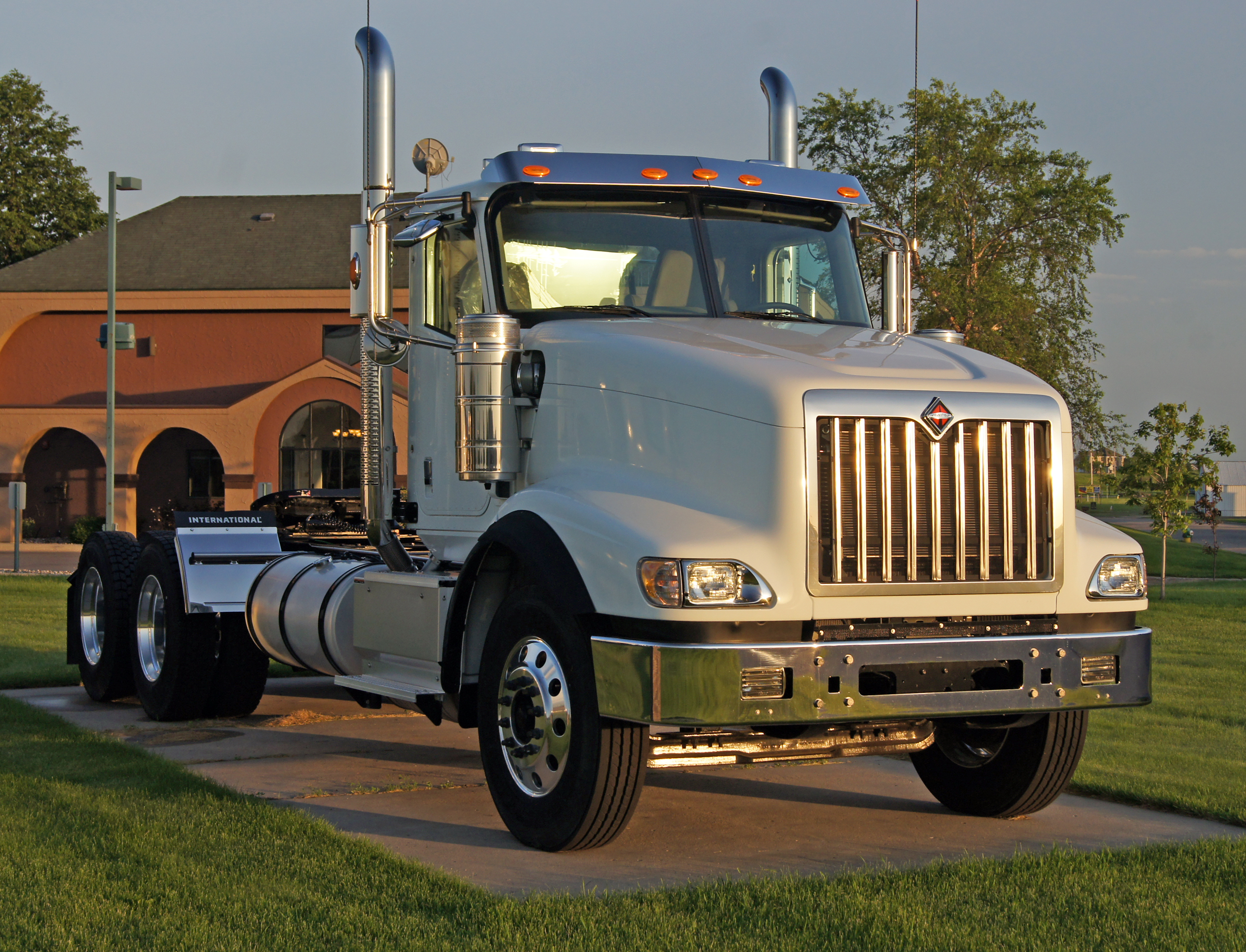
- 2015 International Paystar (third generation)

Overview
- Manufacturer: International Harvester (1972–1986); Navistar International (1986–2016)
- Production: 1972–2016

Body and chassis
- Class: Severe Service Conventional

Powertrain
- Engine: International DV-550B V8 diesel, International DT466 Cat 1160 V8, Cummins V555, Detroit Diesel 6V53N
- Transmission: Allison automatic transmission, Eaton 18-speed UltraShift

Chronology
- Predecessor: International R-Series medium-duty
- Successor: HX Series

The International Paystar (also known as 5000e and PayStar) is a series of trucks that was manufactured by International Harvester and its successor, Navistar International. Produced from 1972 to 2016 across three generations, the Paystar replaced the long-running 210/230 and M-series. Developed for both on and off-road use, the Paystar was the largest commercially-marketed product range sold by International, intended for vocational applications (primarily construction-related). For 2017, the Paystar underwent a substantial redesign, becoming the International HX series.

== History ==
The PayStar was introduced by International Harvester in January 1972 as a construction-specific version of the conventional Transtar.

From 1972 through 1980, it was offered in two ranges: the 5050 with mid-range engines and the 5070 with heavy duty engines. Available in 4×4, 6×4, and 6×6 configurations (Note: Number of wheels × number of powered wheels, with dual tires counted as a single wheel.), they were usually straight trucks but most offered trailer brake options. Semi tractors were also available.

=== 1972-1986 models ===
Table covers the 1972-1974 Paystar range.

Model	Max. front GAWR (Note: Gross Axle Weight Rating is the loaded weight of the axle.)	Max. rear GAWR	Max. GVWR (Note: Gross Vehicle Weight Rating is the loaded weight of the truck.)	Engine (Note: Highest rated engine for model, Caterpillar 3208 or Cummins NT series.)	Trans
5050 4x4	18,000 lb (8,200 kg)	23,000 lb (10,000 kg)	41,000 lb (19,000 kg)	3208	13 spd.
F5050 6x4	18,000 lb (8,200 kg)	38,000 lb (17,000 kg)	33,560 lb (15,220 kg)	3208	13 spd.
5050 6x6	18,000 lb (8,200 kg)	38,000 lb (17,000 kg)	56,000 lb (25,000 kg)	3208	5 spd.
5070 4x4	19,720 lb (8,940 kg)	23,000 lb (10,000 kg)	42,720 lb (19,380 kg)	NTA 400	13 spd.
5070 6x4	19,720 lb (8,940 kg)	53,440 lb (24,240 kg)	73,160 lb (33,180 kg)	NTA-370	13 spd.

The second generation trucks increased weight capacity and engine power. The plate fenders and butterfly hoods were replaced with a one-piece forward tilting hood. The 5500 had a forward front axle, the 5600 had a setback, and the 5900 was a semi tractor.

=== 2004 models ===
Model	Max. front GAWR	Max. rear GAWR	Max. GVWR	Engine (Note: All models have Caterpillar or Cummins engines with up to 565 hp (421 kW).)	Trans (Note: All models available with 18 spd. manual or 6 spd. automatic.)
5500 4x4	20,000 lb (9,100 kg)	30,000 lb (14,000 kg)	50,000 lb (23,000 kg)		
5500 6x4	20,000 lb (9,100 kg)	70,000 lb (32,000 kg)	78,000 lb (35,000 kg)		
5500 6x6	20,000 lb (9,100 kg)	70,000 lb (32,000 kg)	66,000 lb (30,000 kg)		
56000 4x4	22,000 lb (10,000 kg)	30,000 lb (14,000 kg)	53,000 lb (24,000 kg)		
5600 6x4	22,000 lb (10,000 kg)	70,000 lb (32,000 kg)	8,000 lb (3,600 kg)		
5600 6x6	22,000 lb (10,000 kg)	70,000 lb (32,000 kg)	69,000 lb (31,000 kg)		
5900 4x2	20,000 lb (9,100 kg)	23,000 lb (10,000 kg)	36,000 lb (16,000 kg)		
5900 6x4	20,000 lb (9,100 kg)	58,000 lb (26,000 kg)	78,000 lb (35,000 kg)		

By 2013, the PayStar was commonly a semi tractor although straight truck applications were still offered. Severe service straight truck applications were handled by the Workstar series, which offered no semi-tractors. In 2013 the PayStar is only offered as a 6×4 or 8×6 with high horsepower engines.

=== 2013 models ===
Model	Max. front GAWR	Max. rear GAWR	Max. GVWR	Engine (Note: All models have Cummins or International engines with up to 600 hp (450 kW))	Trans (Note: All models available with 18 spd. manual and an automatic.)
5900 6x4	22,000 lb (10,000 kg)	65,000 lb (29,000 kg)	80,000 lb (36,000 kg)		
5900 8x6	22,000 lb (10,000 kg)	78,000 lb (35,000 kg) (Note: A tridem with three powered axles on an air suspension.)	80,000 lb (36,000 kg)		

== Gallery ==
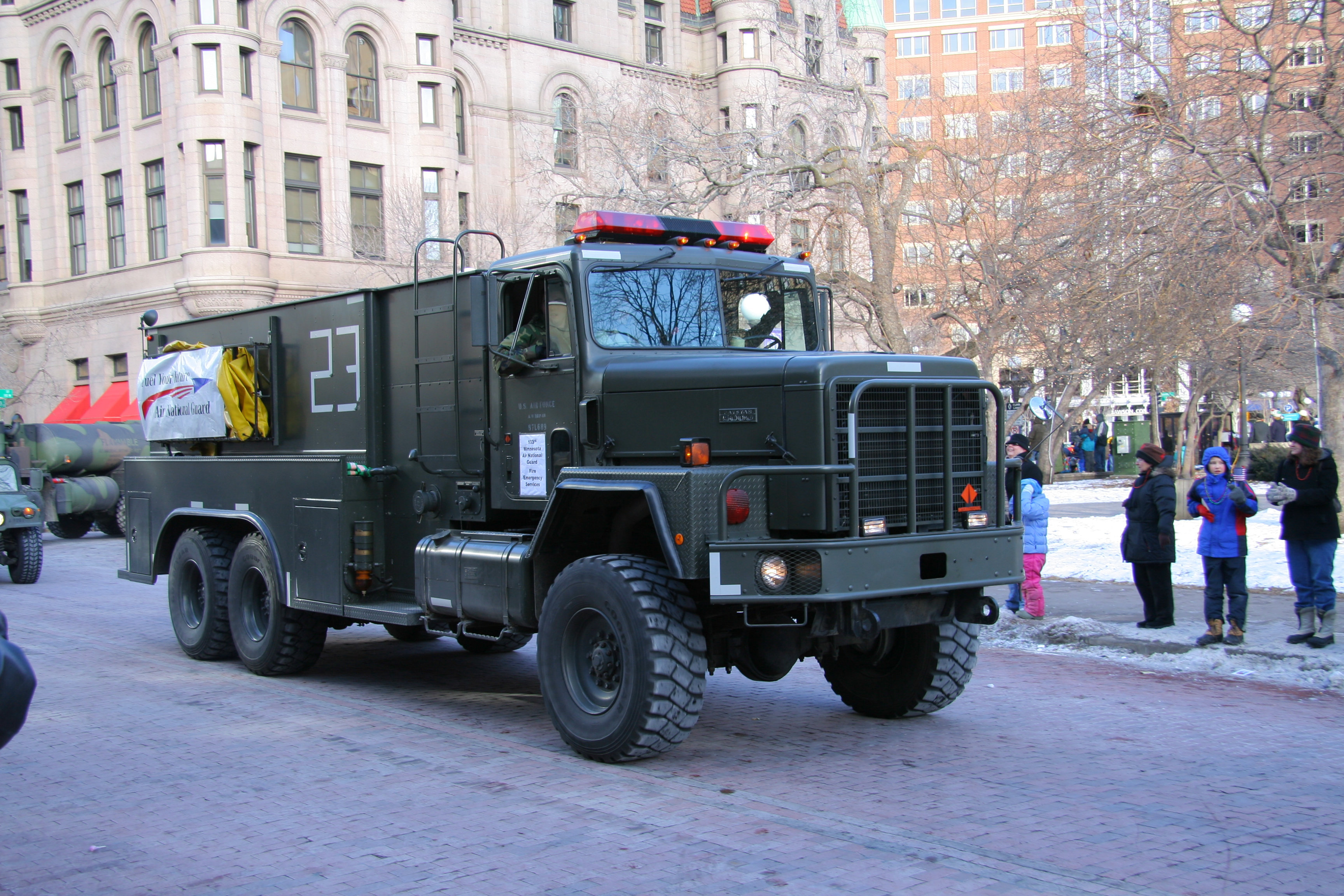
5050 Fire engine
(First generation)

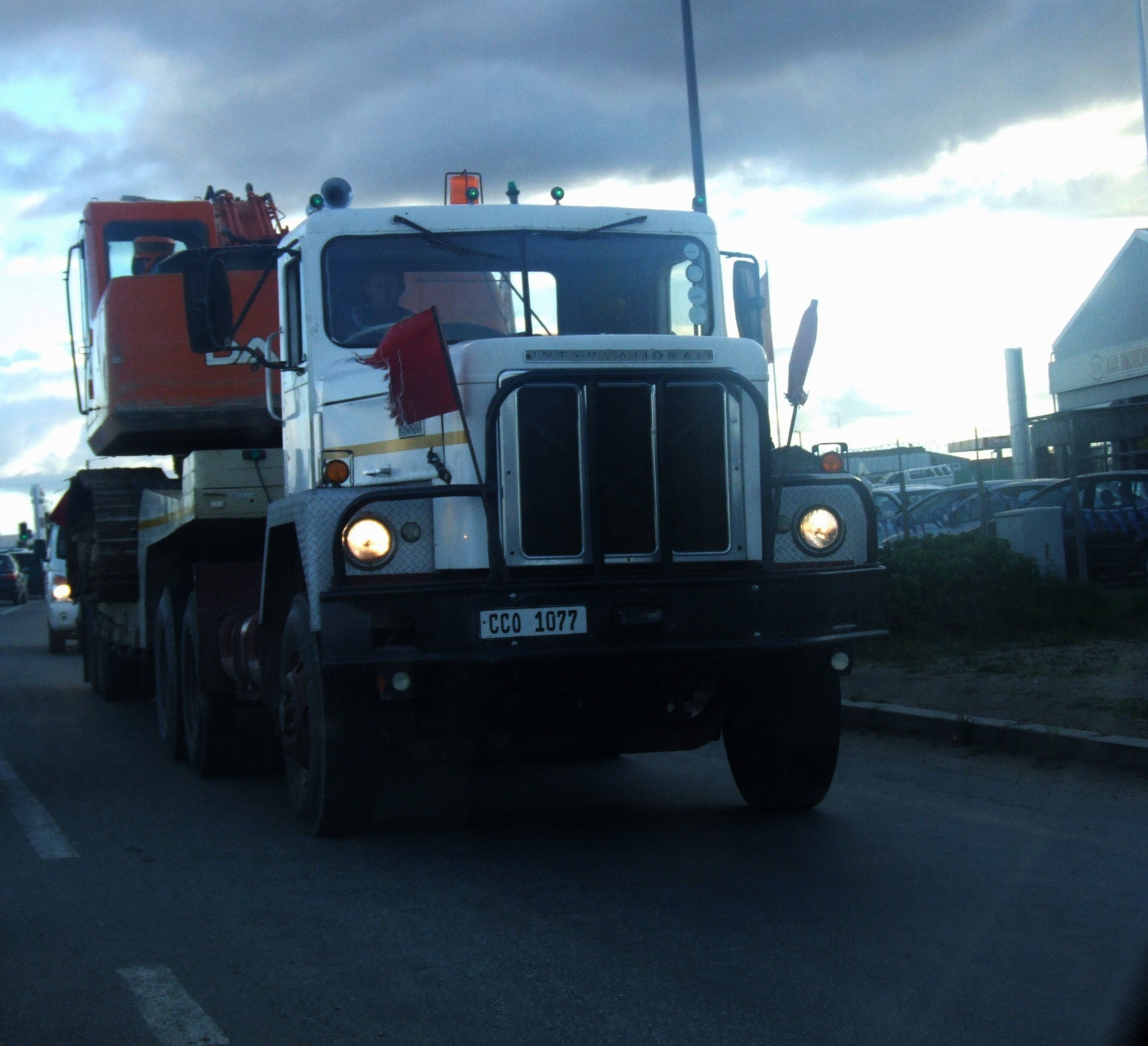
5070 Semi-tractor
(first generation)

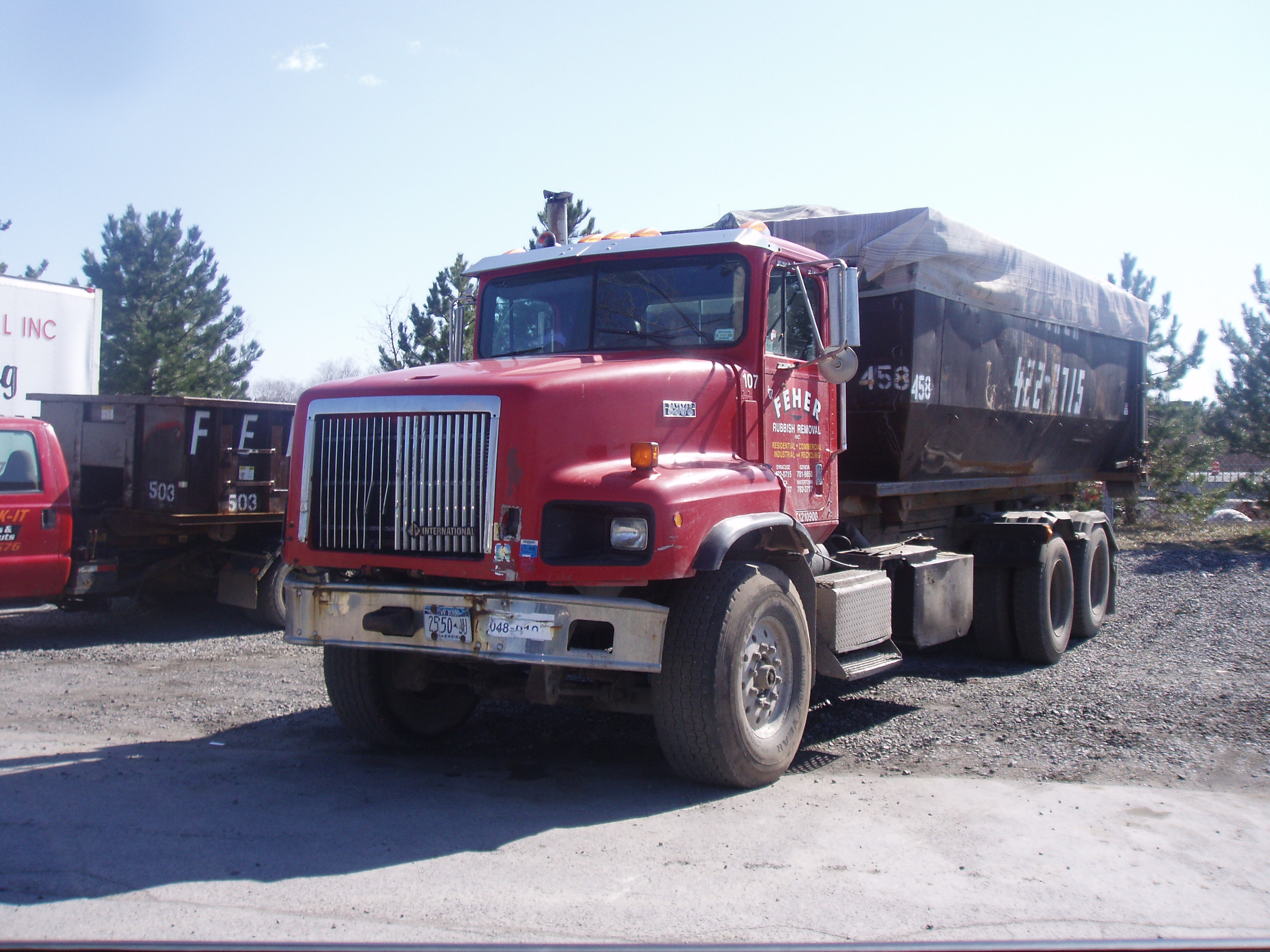
5500 Roll-off container
(Second generation)

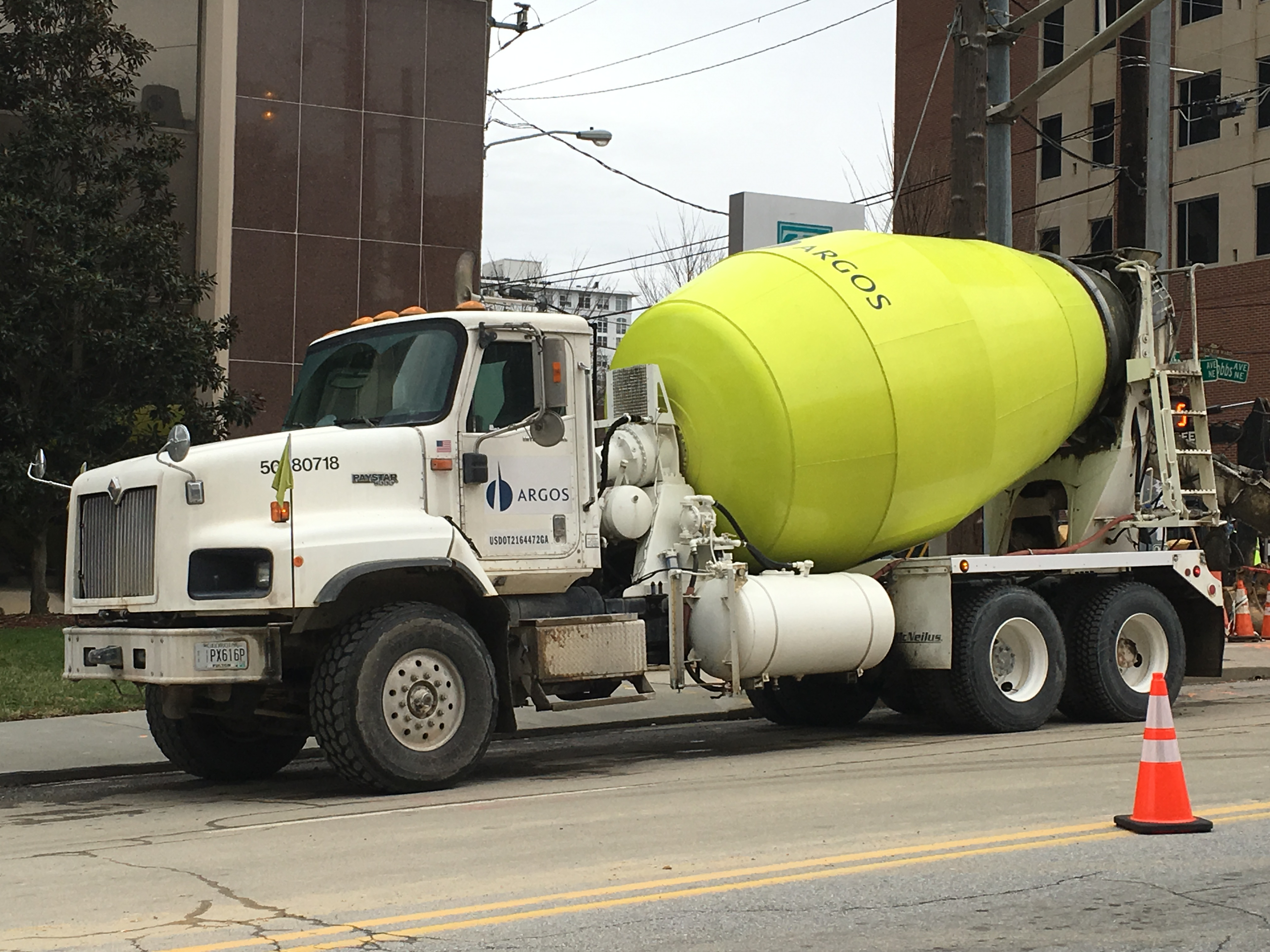
5600 Concrete mixer
(second generation)

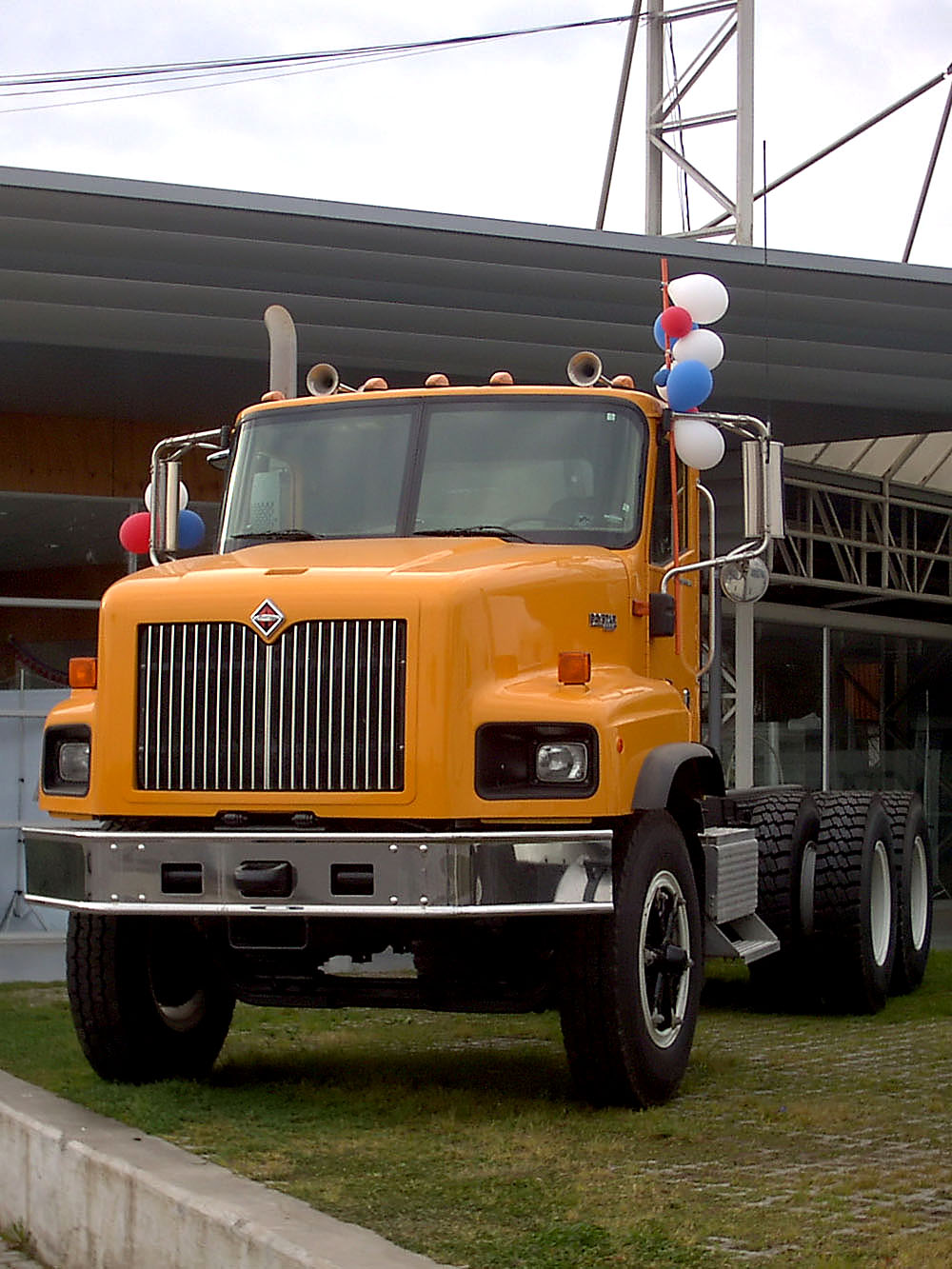
5600 Chassis-cab
(Third generation)

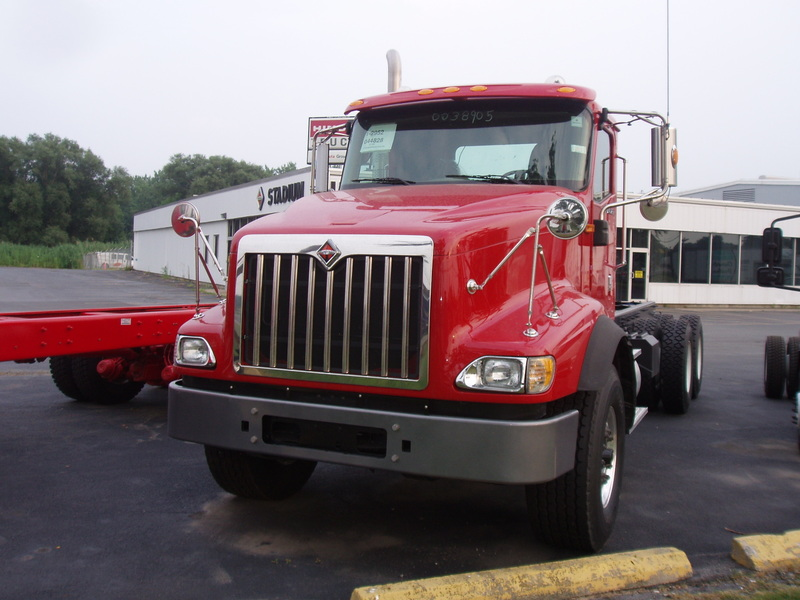
5900 Chassis-cab
(Third generation)
