= International Loadstar =

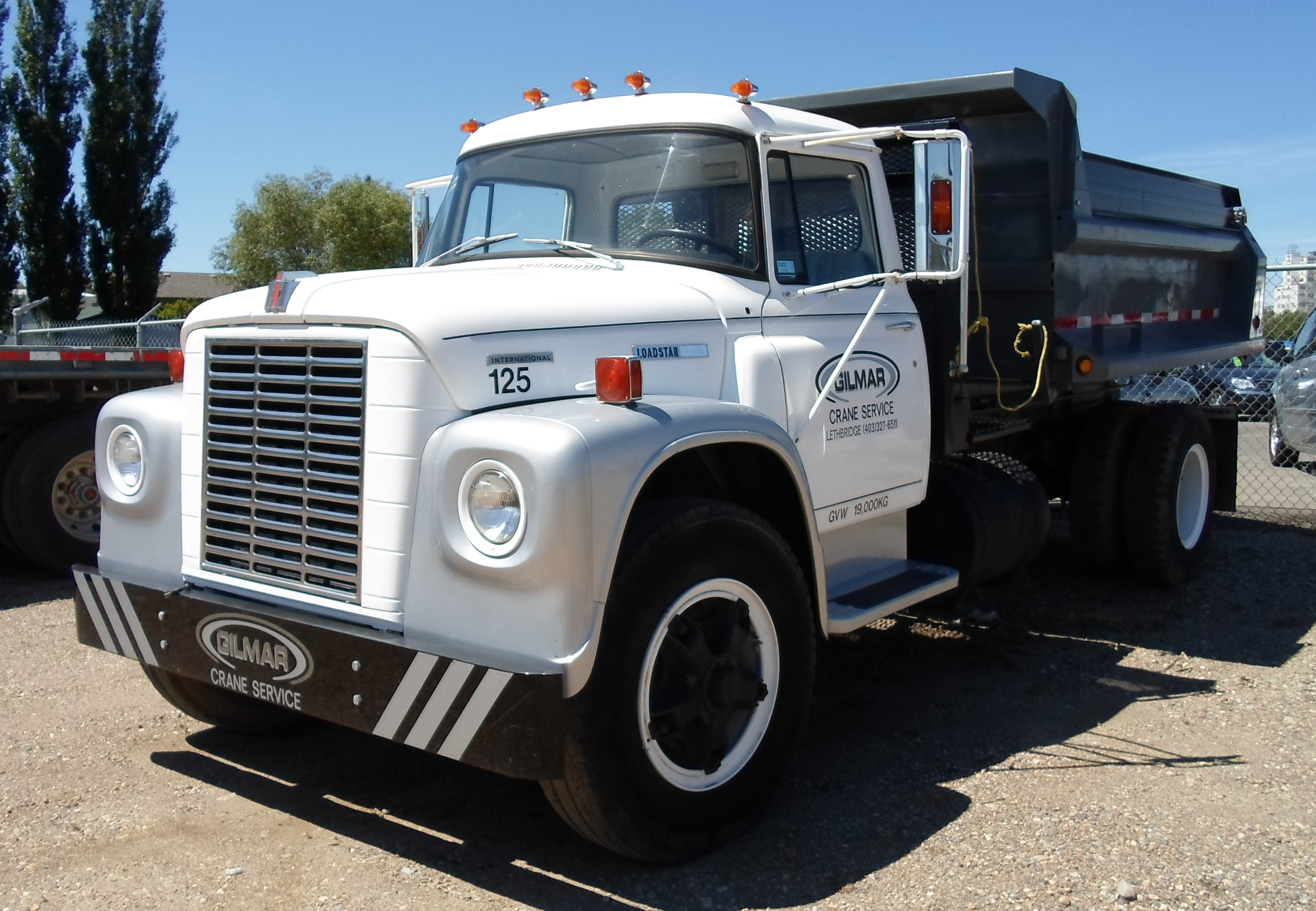

Overview
- Manufacturer: International Harvester (1962-1978)
- Production: 1962-1978

Body and chassis
- Class: Class 6-7
- Body style: Truck (bonneted cab)
- Layout: 4x2, 4x4, 6X4, 6X6

Powertrain
- Engine: Gasoline; *154–210 hp (115–157 kW); Diesel; *113–200 hp (84–149 kW)
- Transmission: 4, 5, 7, 8, and 10-speed manual 4 and 6-speed automatic

Chronology
- Predecessor: International Harvester R-Series
- Successor: International Harvester S-Series

The International Loadstar is a series of trucks that were produced by International Harvester from 1962 to 1978. The first purpose-built medium-duty truck designed by the company, International slotted the Loadstar between its light-duty pickup trucks (initially the C-series, later the D-series) and the heavy-duty R-series. Following the discontinuation of the latter, the Loadstar became the smallest International conventional, slotted below the Fleetstar and Transtar conventionals.

Produced primarily as a straight truck, the Loadstar was developed primarily for applications such as local delivery, construction, and agriculture. Along with fire truck applications, the Loadstar was offered as a "Schoolmaster" cowled school bus chassis.

In 1978, International introduced the medium-duty S-Series, consolidating the Loadstar and Fleetstar into a single model family.

== Production and models ==
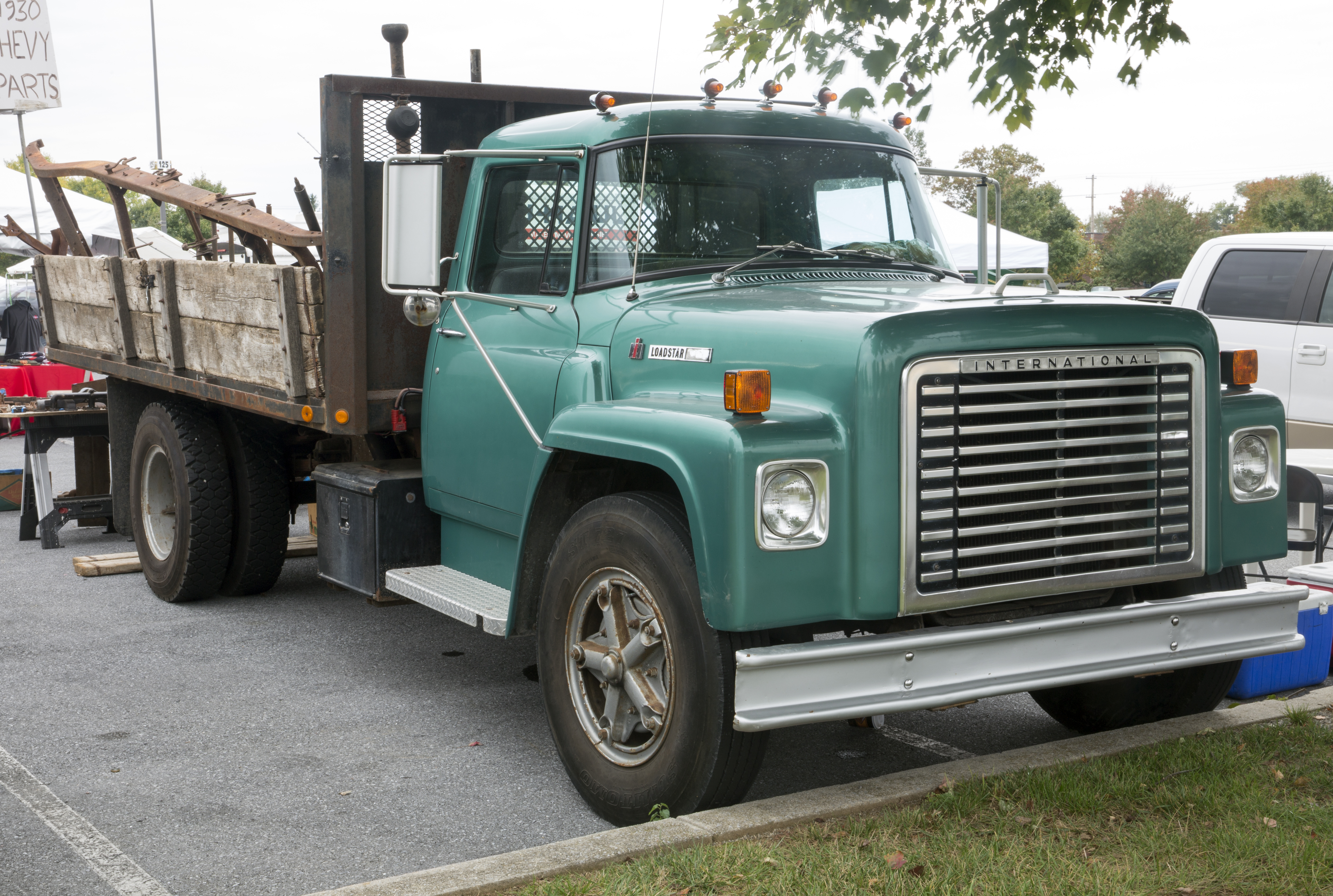
1972-1978 Loadstar with tilting hood

International manufactured a complete line of trucks and used few light and medium-duty vendor parts. A conservative company, components had long production runs without model year changes. The Loadstar itself changed very little over its sixteen year production run. Early models were recognizable by their grey grill, curved fenders and "butterfly" hood, but a squared-off one-piece fiberglass tilting hood was added to the line-up from model year 1972 onwards.

=== Loadstar ===
Most Loadstars had a medium-duty 4x2 chassis, but 4x4, 6x4, and 6x6 models were also built. A four-door crew cab was also available. The cab, also used on the Fleetstar (during its first few years of production), had been introduced on the A-series in 1957.

Models included: Binder, 1600, 1700, 1750, 1800, F1800, 1850, and F1850, with the numbers indicating the size and weight rating of the model. The 1750 and 1850 had mid-range diesels. The 1600 and 1700 were available with 4x4, the F1800 and F1850 had tandem rear axles.

=== Loadstar CO ===
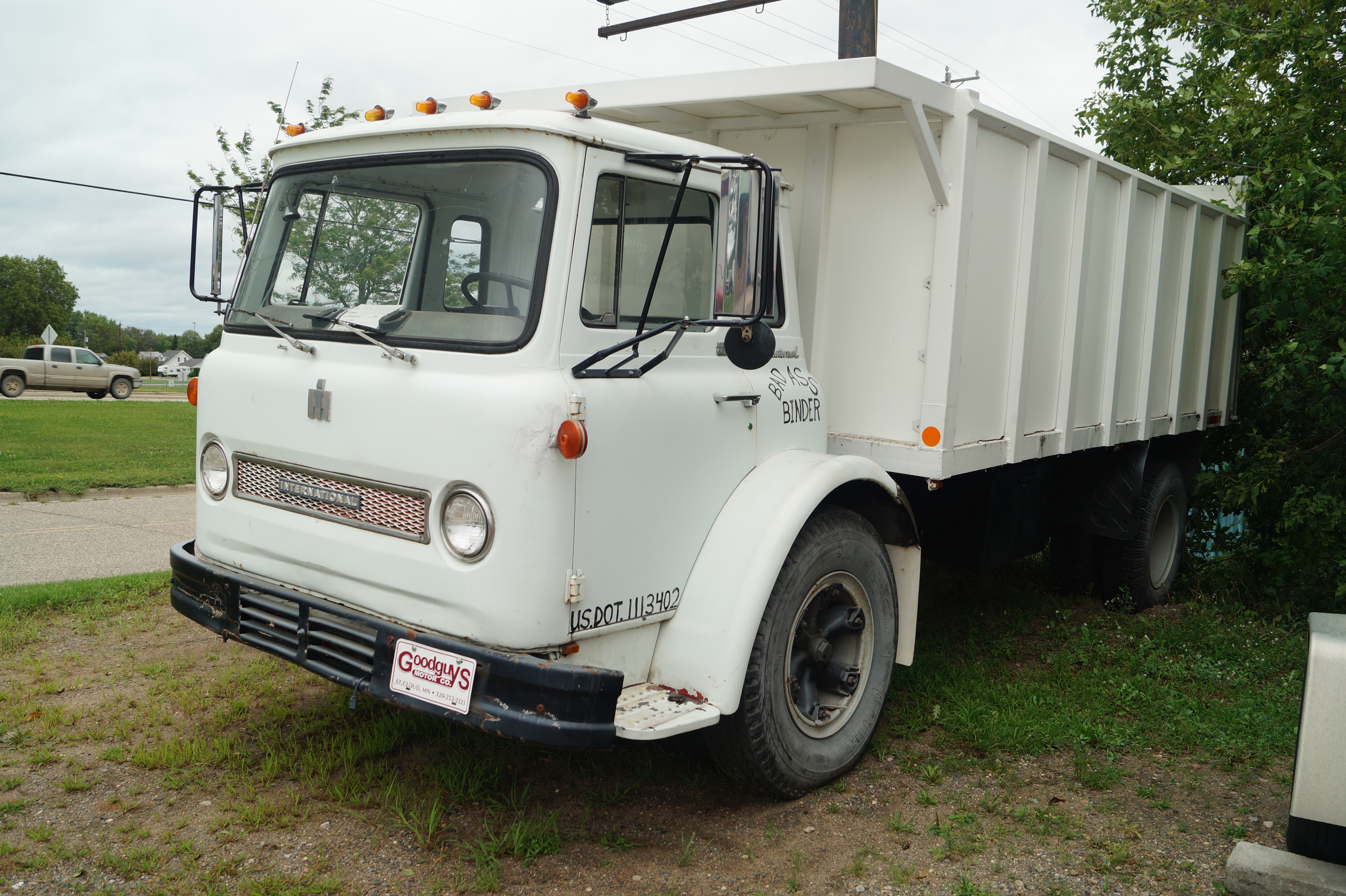
1970 International Loadstar CO 1700

The Loadstar CO 1600, 1700, and 1800 were forward control cab-over-engine versions of the Loadstar, built from 1963 until 1970. They were available with loaded weights from 19,500 to 27,500 pounds (8,800 to 12,500 kg). For 1971, the Loadstar CO became the Cargostar, with a wider cab and larger grille; the model line would be produced through 1986.

=== Schoolmaster ===
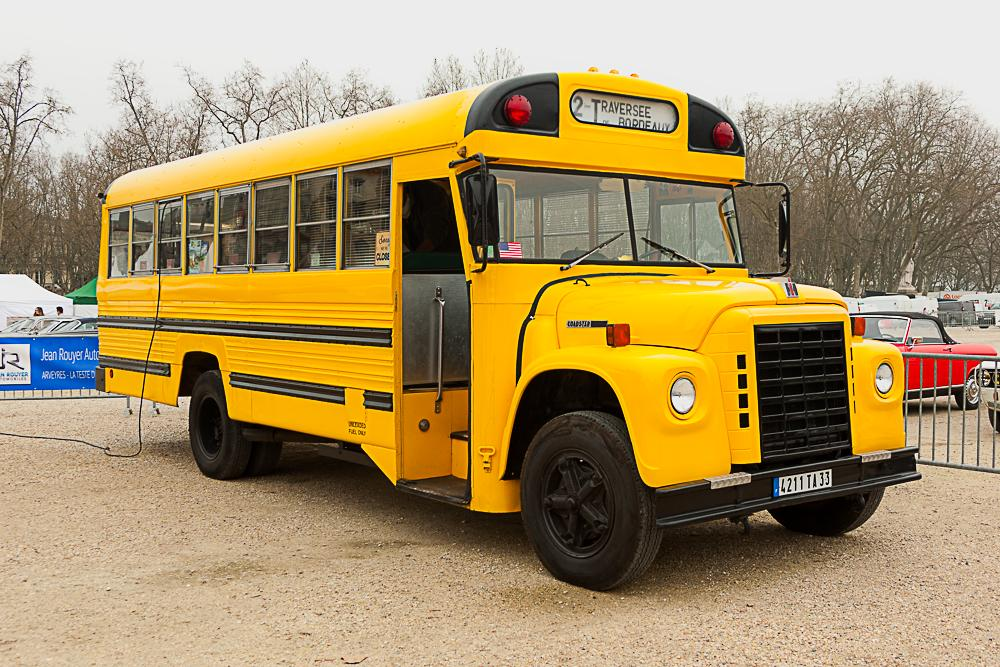
1970s International Loadstar 1603 "Schoolmaster" with school bus body

The Schoolmaster 1603, 1703, and 1803, and 1853 were cowl-chassis models used for school-bus type bodies. The Loadstar also served as the basis for the 173/183 FC (forward control) and 183/193 RE (rear engine) stripped chassis for transit-style school buses.

== Design overview ==
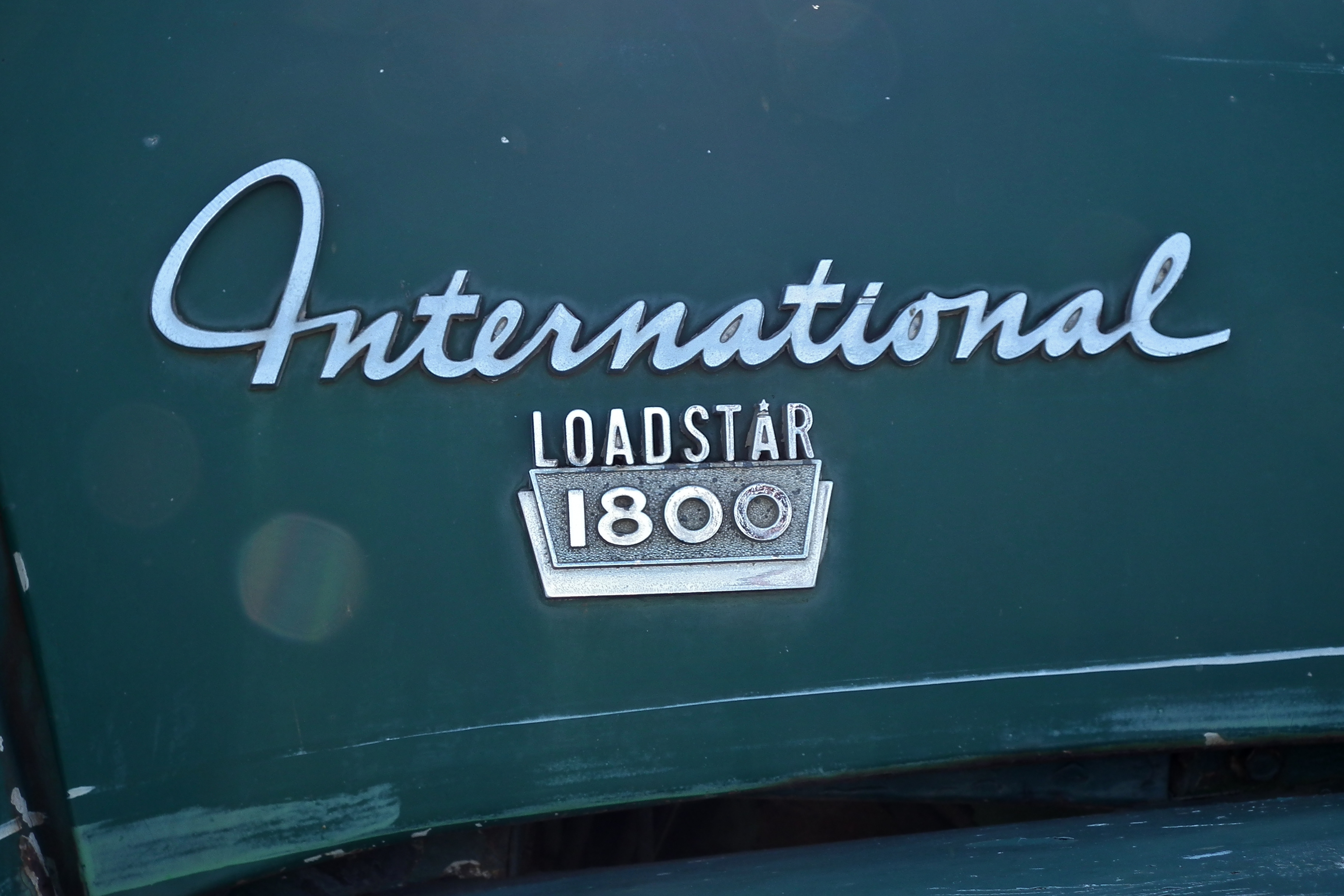
1962-1971 Loadstar hood badging

=== Chassis ===
Models other than semi-tractors had vacuum assisted hydraulic drum brakes standard. Air over hydraulic and full air brakes were available. A driven front axle and tandem rear axles were available on some models (cab-over-engine models could have neither). Loaded weights were from 18,200 to 30,200 pounds (8,300 to 13,700 kg) and up to 50,000 pounds (23,000 kg) including trailers.

=== Engines ===
Gasoline, CNG, and mid-range diesel engines were used. The short hood of the Loadstar meant that V-8 engines fit better than straight-six engines.

The V304/345/392 family was the primary engine of the Loadstar between 1962 and 1973. They are 304, 345, and 392 cubic inches (5.0, 5.7, and 6.4 L) overhead valve gasoline V8s. They developed 193, 197, and 236 horsepower (144, 147, and 176 kW) respectively. CNG V345s were also available. In 1962 the V304 was standard on the 1600 and 1700 while the V345 was standard on the 1800. On most models the next larger engine was optional. In 1974 the V345 became standard on the 1600.

The MV404 was introduced in 1974. It was a 404 cubic inches (6.6 L) overhead valve gasoline V8 with a 4-barrel carburetor. It developed 210 horsepower (160 kW) and 366 pound force-feet (496 N⋅m) of torque. It became standard on the 1700 and 1800.

The BD264/282/308 family were the only inline-six cylinder gasoline engines offered. They were 264, 282, and 308 cubic inches (4.3, 4.6, and 5.0 L) and developed 154, 136, and 202 horsepower (115, 101, and 151 kW) respectively.

Mid-range diesels were International V8s up to 200 horsepower (150 kW), the Detroit Diesel 6V53 with 195 horsepower (145 kW), and Perkins inline-sixes up to 130 horsepower (97 kW).

Model	Max. front GAWR (Note: Gross axle weight rating is the loaded weight of the axle.)	Max. rear GAWR	Max. GVWR (Note: Gross vehicle weight rating is the loaded weight of the truck.)	Engine (Note: Highest rated engine for model.)	Trans
Binder	5,000 LB (2,270 kg)	14,200 lb (6,440 kg)	19,200 lb (8,711 kg)	V-345	4 spd.
1600	7,500 lb (3,400 kg)	17,000 lb (7,700 kg)	24,500 lb (11,100 kg)	V-345	5 spd. (Note: A 4 spd. automatic was available.)
1600 4x4	6,000 lb (2,700 kg)	14,200 lb (6,400 kg)	35,000 lb (16,000 kg)	V-345	5 spd.
1700	9,000 lb (4,100 kg)	18,500 lb (8,400 kg)	27,500 lb (12,500 kg)	MV-404	4 spd.
1700 4x4	9,000 lb (4,100 kg)	17,000 lb (7,700 kg)	26,000 lb (12,000 kg)	V-345	5 spd.
1800	9,000 lb (4,100 kg)	21,200 lb (9,600 kg)	30,200 lb (13,700 kg)	MV-446	10 spd.
1850	9,000 lb (4,100 kg)	21,200 lb (9,600 kg)	30,200 lb (13,700 kg)	D-170	5 spd.
F1800 6x4	10,860 lb (4,930 kg)	34,000 lb (15,000 kg)	44,600 lb (20,200 kg)	MV-404	5 spd.
F1850 6x4	12,000 lb (5,400 kg)	34,000 lb (15,000 kg)	46,000 lb (21,000 kg)	D-170	5 spd.

=== Driveline ===
Four- and five-speed manual transmissions were used on most models. A 2-speed rear axle was available on any gasoline single-axle model. Diesel models were available with 8- and 10-speed Roadranger manual transmissions. Four- and six-speed automatic transmissions were available on some models.

== Navistar concept (2012) ==
There was a plan in 2012 to revive the Loadstar name for a series of heavy duty low-slung cabover trucks, to be particularly suitable for waste hauling. This Loadstar was to have offered a stainless steel cab (which would have been an industry first) to resist the corrosion associated with waste disposal, airplane refueling, and other such fields for which the truck was intended.

Production was scheduled to begin in 2013 but never did.
