= International S series =

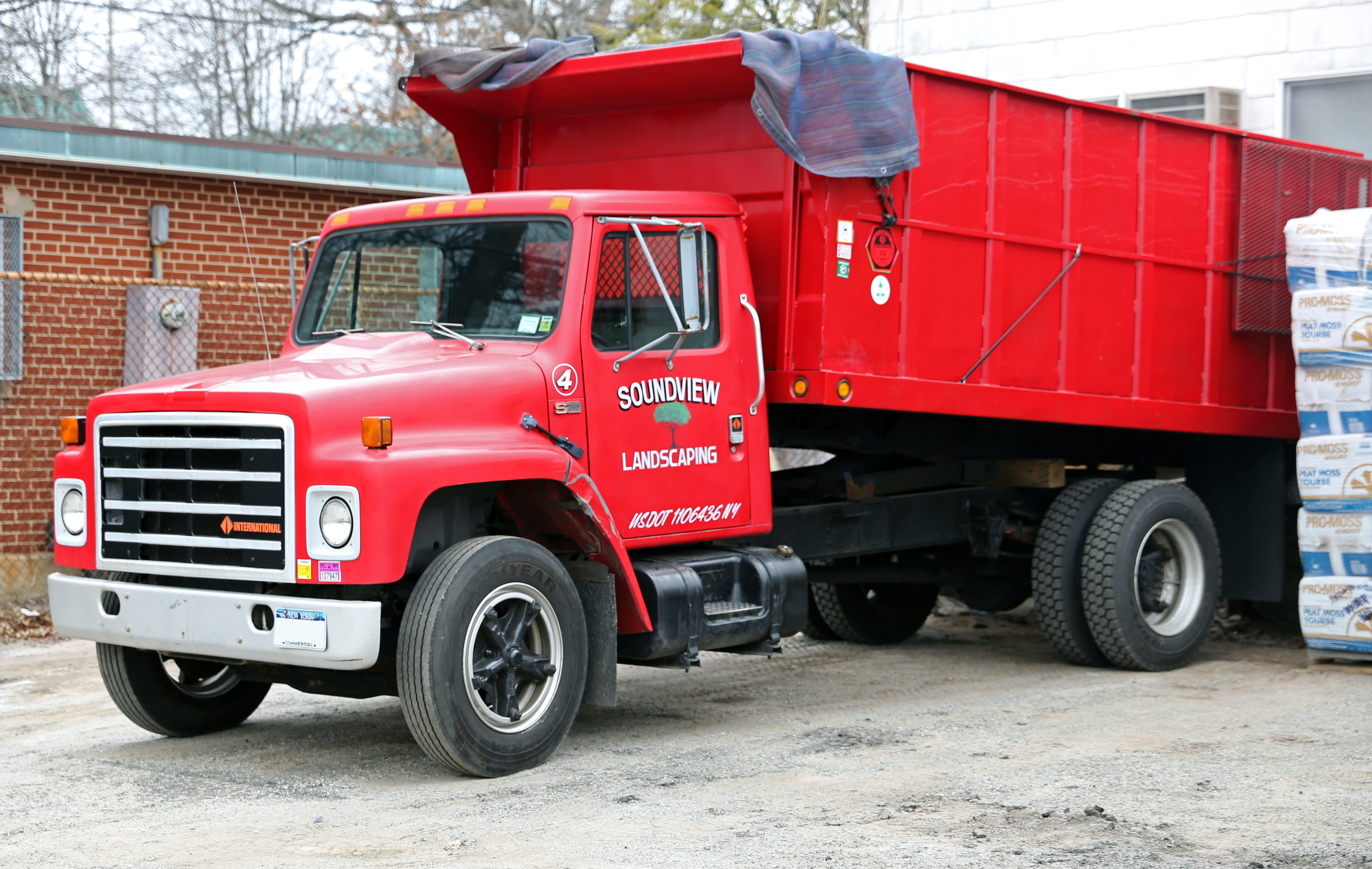
- 1989 Navistar International S-1700 dual-axle dump truck

Overview
- Manufacturer: International Harvester (1978–1986); Navistar International (1986–2001)
- Also called: Navistar International 4000 series Navistar International 8000 series
- Production: 1977–2001

Body and chassis
- Class: Class 6-7 medium-duty truck
- Body style: Truck (conventional): Tractor; Straight truck; Bus: Cowled chassis (conventional); Stripped chassis (forward control)
- Layout: 4x2 6x4
- Related: International S series "Schoolmaster"/International 3800; Powertrans T1250

Powertrain
- Engine: Gasoline; 197–236 hp (147–176 kW); Diesel; 150–500 hp (110–370 kW)
- Transmission: Manual; Automatic

Chronology
- Predecessor: International Fleetstar; International R-Series; International Loadstar
- Successor: International 4000 series/DuraStar (2001)

The International S series is a range of trucks that was manufactured by International Harvester (later Navistar International) from 1977 to 2001. Introduced to consolidate the medium-duty IHC Loadstar and heavy-duty IHC Fleetstar into a single product range, the S series was slotted below the Transtar and Paystar Class 8 conventionals.

The IHC S series was produced in a number of variants for a wide variety of applications, including straight trucks, semitractors, vocational trucks, and severe-service trucks. Additionally, the S series was produced in other body configurations, including a four-door crew cab, cutaway cab, cowled chassis, and a stripped chassis (primarily for school buses). The chassis was produced with both gasoline and diesel powertrains (the latter exclusively after 1986), single or tandem rear axles, and two, four, or, six-wheel drive layouts.

The last complete product line designed within the existence of International Harvester, the S series was produced in its original form through 1989. During 1989, the S-Series underwent a major revision and was split into multiple model lines. After 2001, International phased in product lines based upon the "NGV" architecture; severe-service and bus chassis variants produced through 2003 and 2004, respectively.

== Previous use of name ==
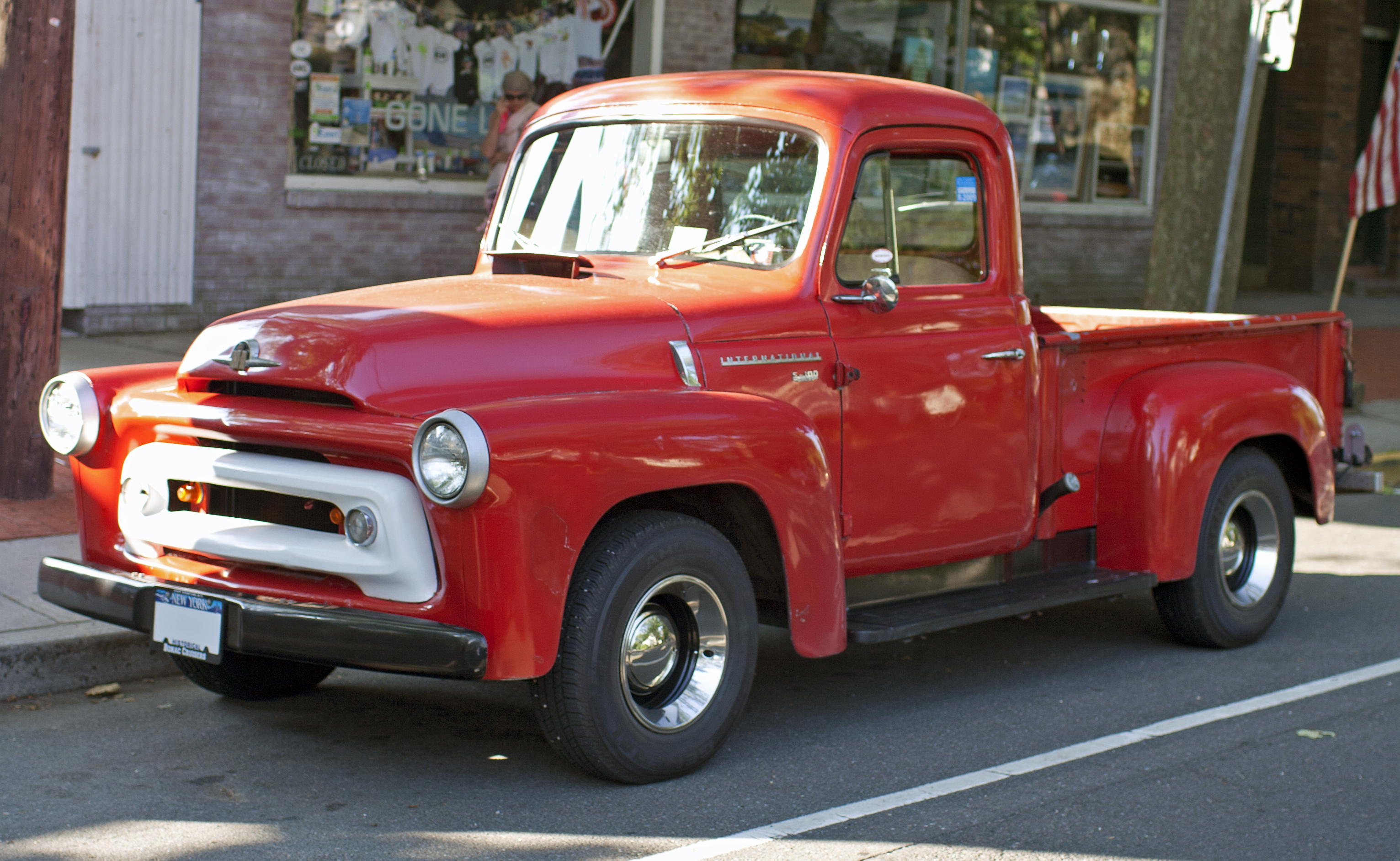
1956 International Harvester S100

The S-series model designation was first used by International Harvester during the 1950s. During 1955 production, the R series model family underwent an update, with International renaming its light-duty and medium-duty trucks the S-series.

The model designation was used through 1957, when International introduced the A-series model family as an all-new design.

== First generation (S series; 1978–1989) ==
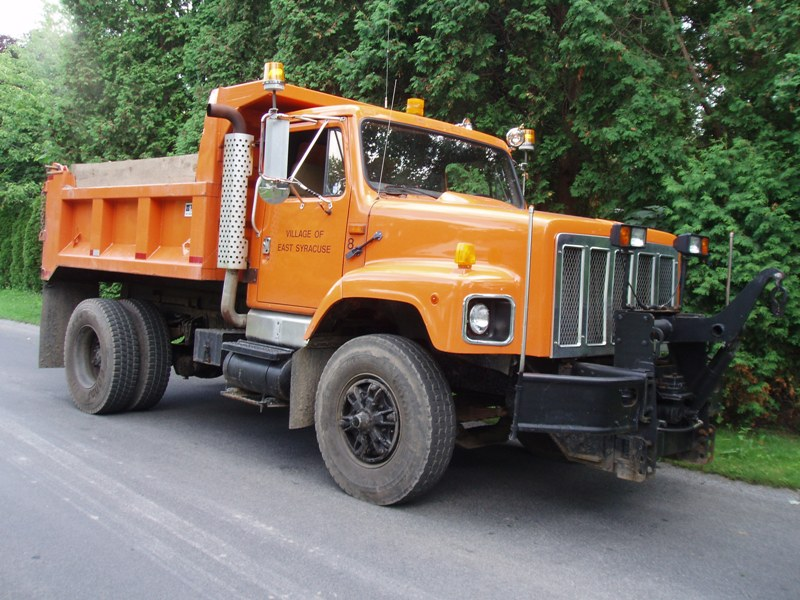
Navistar 2600 in use as a municipal service truck

In April 1977, International Harvester unveiled the medium-duty S series at an event at the New Orleans Superdome. The initial lineup consisted of heavier-duty 2200, 2500, and 2600 models (28,000-45,000 lb gross vehicle weight rating - GVWR), replacing the Fleetstar. In the summer of 1978, lighter-GVWR models (replacing the Loadstar) were released for sale. The 21 models of the full lineup had a high degree of parts interchangability; this standardization helped lower the number of parts used by 30%.

Following the discontinuation of the IHC pickup-truck line in 1975, the S series was designed with a model-specific cab, replacing the pickup-truck cab used for the Loadstar (designed for the 1957 A series). More vertically oriented than its predecessor, the design was much wider, as well. To lower maintenance costs, all windows in the cab were designed with flat glass, including the windshield. Similar in style to the tilting hood introduced for the Loadstar in 1972, all S-series trucks were given a tilting fiberglass hood.

The S series was produced throughout the 1980s, largely unmodified, and 1987 marked several changes to the S-series trucks. To reflect the corporate transition of the company from International Harvester to Navistar International, S-series trucks received changes in their badging (alongside all International vehicles). On the grille, the word "International" across the top of the grille was replaced by a red Navistar "diamond" logo alongside "International" in red at the bottom right of the grille. Inside, the IHC "tractor" logo on the steering wheel was replaced by a Navistar diamond logo. In a major shift, for 1987, International became the first truck manufacturer to produce a medium-duty product line powered exclusively by diesel engines.

=== Models ===
Originally intended to use the International Tristar nameplate, the S series consolidated the aging Loadstar and Fleetstar trucks under a single product line. Tandem-axle (6x4) versions of the S series were named F-series trucks.

==== Class 6 trucks ====
The S1600, S1700, S1800, and S1900 were introduced in 1979. Replacing the International Harvester Loadstar model line, the model was produced in a number of configurations, with single and tandem rear axles, 4x4/6x6 drive options, and gasoline and diesel engines. The S-1800 and S-1900-were produced as both truck tractors (for semitrailers) and straight trucks, while the S-1700 and S-1800 were used in the production of International Harvester bus chassis (primarily for school-bus use).

==== Class 7-8 trucks ====
Introduced in 1978 as the replacement for the Fleetstar, the S2100 and S2200 were joined by the severe-service S2500 and S2600, slotted below the International Paystar 5000. Configured primarily as tractors, the S2100s were fitted with a sloped hood. To accommodate larger-bore diesel engines under a standard-length hood, the S2200 was fitted with a widened cab (distinguished by a two-piece windshield).

In 1982, the S2300 was introduced; the model line was essentially an S2100 with International diesel engines replaced with Cummins-sourced powertrains.

1978–1983 models

Model	Max. front GAWR (Note: Gross Axle Weight Rating is the loaded weight of the axle.)	Max. rear GAWR	Engine (Note: Highest rated gasoline, diesel engine.)	Trans (Note: Speeds in manual(M), automatic(A) transmission)
1600 4x2	5,000 lb (2,300 kg)	15,000 lb (6,800 kg)	V-345	4M, 4A
Binder 4x2	1,600 lb (730 kg)	15,000 lb (6,800 kg)	V-345	5M, 4A
1700 4x2	7,500 lb (3,400 kg)	15,500 lb (7,000 kg)	MV-404, D-170	10M, 5A
1800 4x2	6,000 lb (2,700 kg)	15,500 lb (7,000 kg)	MV-446, DT-466	13M, 5A
1800 4x4	9,000 lb (4,100 kg)	15,500 lb (7,000 kg)	MV-446, DT-466	5M, 4A
1900 4x2	8,000 lb (3,600 kg)	17,500 lb (7,900 kg)	MV-446, DT-466	10M, 5A
1900 6x4	9,000 lb (4,100 kg)	34,000 lb (15,000 kg)	MV-466, DT-466	10M, 5A
1900 6x6	9,000 lb (4,100 kg)	34,000 lb (15,000 kg)	MV-466, DT-466	5M
2100 4x2	9,000 lb (4,100 kg)	17,500 lb (7,900 kg)	V-537, DT-466	10M
2100 6x4	9,000 lb (4,100 kg)	34,000 lb (15,000 kg)	V-537, DT-466	10M
2200 4x2	10,800 lb (4,900 kg)	23,000 lb (10,000 kg)	Cat 3406	13M
2200 6X4	12,000 lb (5,400 kg)	23,000 lb (10,000 kg)	Cat 3406	13M
2300 4x4	12,000 lb (5,400 kg)	41,000 lb (19,000 kg)		
2500 4x2	16,000 lb (7,300 kg)	29,000 lb (13,000 kg)	Cat 3406	13M
2500 6X4	18,000 lb (8,200 kg)	44,000 lb (20,000 kg)	Cat 3406	13M
2600 4x2	16,000 lb (7,300 kg)	29,000 lb (13,000 kg)	Cummins PT	13M
2600 6X4	18,000 lb (8,200 kg)	44,000 lb (20,000 kg)	Cummins PT	13M

== Second generation ("Thousand Series"; 1989–2002) ==
During 1989 production, the S-series line underwent a substantial model update. While the cab structure from 1977 was retained, nearly everything else underwent a complete redesign. On nearly all models, the hoodline was lowered and given closer-fitting fenders (with halogen headlamps and integrated turn signals). The interior was completely restyled, adopting an electronically-controlled instrument cluster and a two-spoke steering wheel.

During its production life, the second-generation vehicles had few major changes. From 1989 to its 2001 discontinuation, the exterior remained nearly unchanged; in 1992, Navistar changed the design of the instrument panel, updating the entire interior in 1995.

=== Models ===
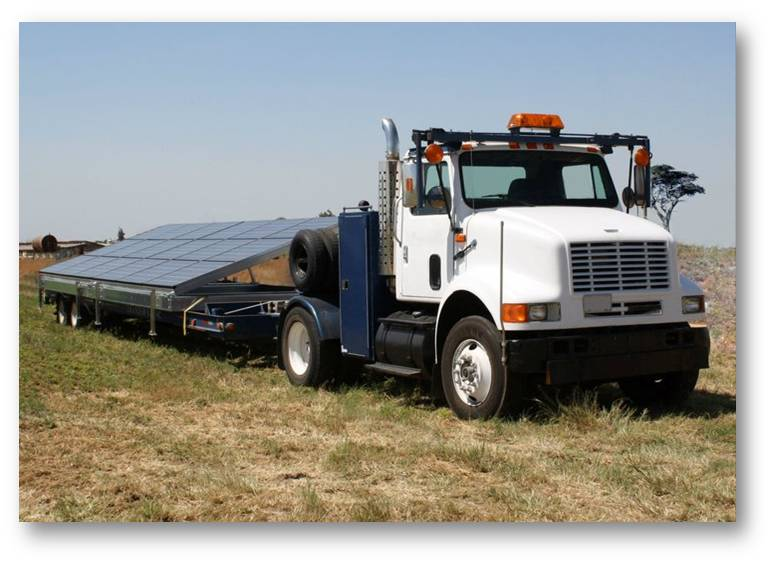
International 8100 4x2 tractor towing solar panels

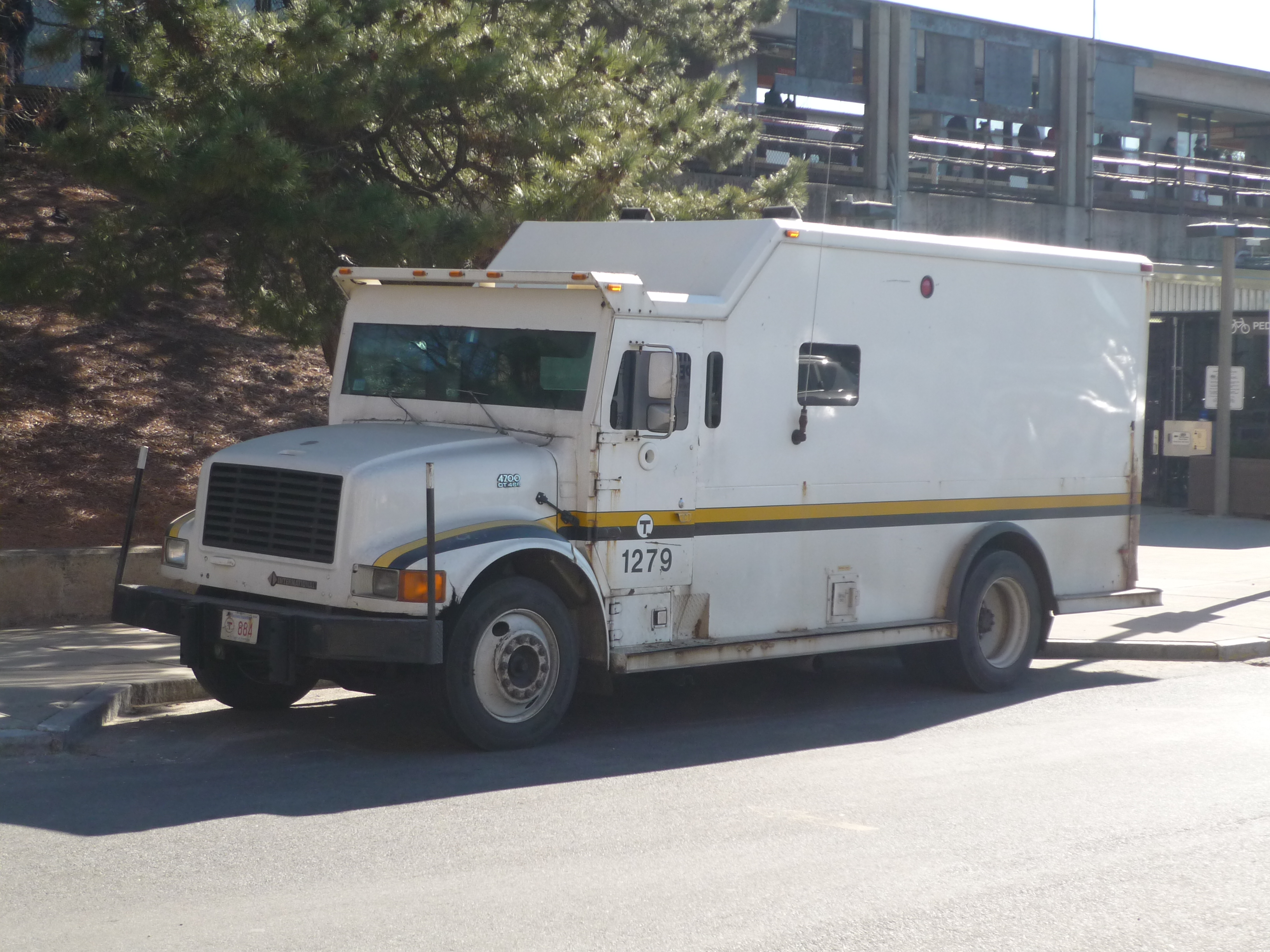
International 4700

For 1989, Navistar split the S-series model line into three distinct model families, all sharing the same cab structure. The S/F-series nomenclature was replaced by the "Thousand Series" nomenclature, bringing it in line with its 9000-series (Transtar conventional/COE) and 5000-series (Paystar) Class 8 trucks. The previous 1600-1800 trucks became the 4000-series Class 6-7 trucks (its Schoolmaster bus chassis variant becoming the 3000-series); the 1900-2300 were replaced by the 7000/8000-series. The 2500/2600 severe-service trucks continued, but dropped their S-series badging prefix.

==== Class 5-7 trucks ====
Replacing the S1600 through S1900, the 4000 series was again produced in a number of configurations, with single and tandem rear axles, 4x4/6x6 drive options. Produced exclusively with diesel engines, the 4000 series was produced with IDI and T444E V8s and DT-series I6 engines.

The 4000 series was produced through 2001, when the nomenclature was adopted by the NGV-generation medium-duty line (later renamed the International DuraStar)

==== Class 7-8 trucks ====
Replacing the S2100 and S2300, the 7100 and 8100 were introduced in 1989; the wide-body S2200 was not replaced. Configured nearly exclusively as tractors, the 8000 series was powered by the Cummins L10 diesel; the 7100 was a variant powered by the DT466.

The 8000 series was produced through 2001, when it was replaced by the NGV-generation regional haul line (renamed the International Transtar).

==== Severe-service trucks ====
Again slotted below the Paystar, the 2500 and 2600 severe-service trucks dropped their S-series prefix. During the 1990s, the set-back axle 2674 was restyled with the aerodynamic hood of the 8300. The 2500/2600 remained in production through 2003, outlasted only by the 3800 school-bus chassis.

Model	Replaced	Notes
4500	S1600	Low-profile chassis
4600		
4700		Low-profile chassis
4900	S1800	Available with tandem rear axles
8100	S1900	
8200		Long hood truck-tractor
8300		Long hood truck-tractor
2500		Long hood
2600		Long hood, set-back front axle Available in 4x2, 4x4, 6x4, and 6x6 drive
3600		Australasia-specific model, similar to 2500 model-specific hood

== Bus use ==
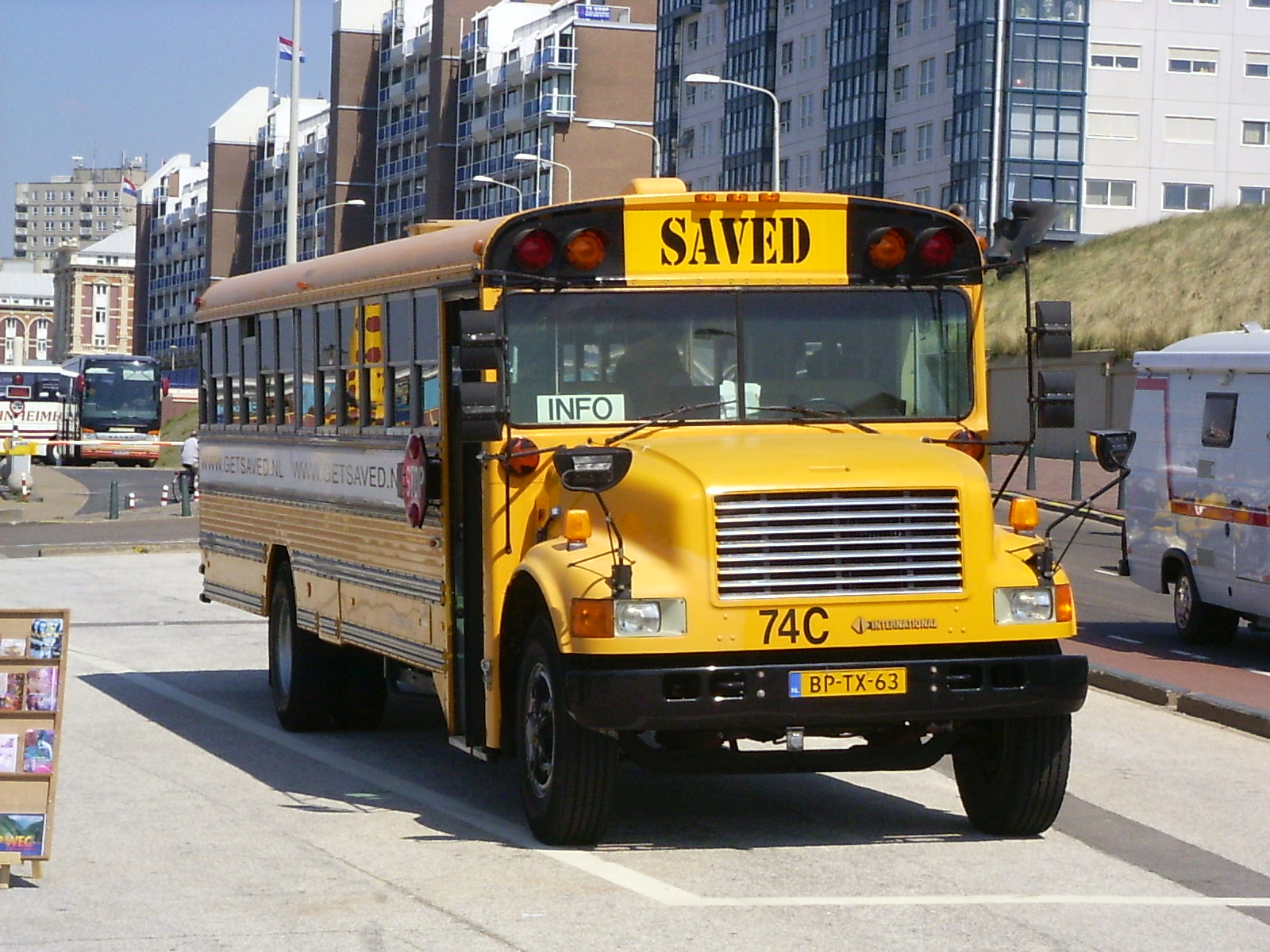
Wayne Lifeguard school bus with International 3800 chassis (retired)

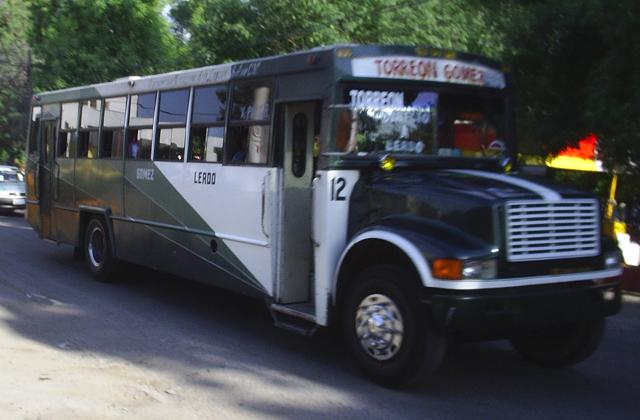
Navistar International bus in Mexico

Throughout its production, the S series was used as a cowled chassis for bus manufacturers. Used primarily for yellow school buses in the United States and Canada, the S series also was used outside of North America as a basis to produce other types of bus bodies. Introduced in 1979, the bus variant of the S series was one of the final models designed by International Harvester before its transition to Navistar. In 1989, the S-series bus chassis was rechristened the 3000 series with the fitment of the new-generation Navistar cowl.

Produced until 2004, the bus chassis outlived its truck counterpart by three years; its 25-year production run is the longest of any North American product ever sold by International Harvester or Navistar. The unrelated Australian ACCO cabover truck built under various guises by IH and IVECO was produced with the same cab architecture for 47 years.

=== Models ===
Models	Replaced	Notes
S-1700 S-1800	Loadstar 1703 Loadstar 1803	
3600		See Thomas Vista Produced 1992-1998
3700 3800	S1700 S1800	

== Powertrain ==
Model (Note: Engines are International unless noted as Caterpillar(Cat), Cummins(Cum), or Detroit Diesel(DD).)	Displacement	Type (Note: Gasoline(G), diesel(D), inline(I), (V), and number of cylinders.)	Power	Torque
V-345	345 cu in (5.7 L)	G V8	197 hp (147 kW)	309 lb⋅ft (419 N⋅m)
V-392	392 cu in (6.4 L)	G V8	236 hp (176 kW)	
MV-404	404 cu in (6.6 L)	G V8	210 hp (160 kW)	336 lb⋅ft (456 N⋅m)
MV-446	446 cu in (7.3 L)	G V8	235 hp (175 kW)	
D-190	549 cu in (9.0 L)	D V8	190 hp (140 kW)	340 lb⋅ft (460 N⋅m)
IDI-420	420 cu in (6.9 L)	D V8	170 hp (130 kW)	
IDI-444	444 cu in (7.3 L)	D V8	190 hp (140 kW)	388 lb⋅ft (526 N⋅m)
Cat 3208	636 cu in (10.4 L)	D V8	210 hp (160 kW)	
Cat 3406	893 cu in (14.6 L)	D I6	380 hp (280 kW)	
Cum NTC-350	855 cu in (14.0 L)	D I6	350 hp (260 kW)	
Cum M11	659 cu in (10.8 L)	D I6	500 hp (370 kW)	1,550 lb⋅ft (2,100 N⋅m)
DD 6-71	426 cu in (7.0 L)	D I6	230 hp (170 kW)	
DD 6V-92	552 cu in (9.0 L)	D V6	335 hp (250 kW)	
DD 8V-92	736 cu in (12.1 L)	D V8	400 hp (300 kW)	

== See also ==
- List of International Harvester vehicles
