= International C series =

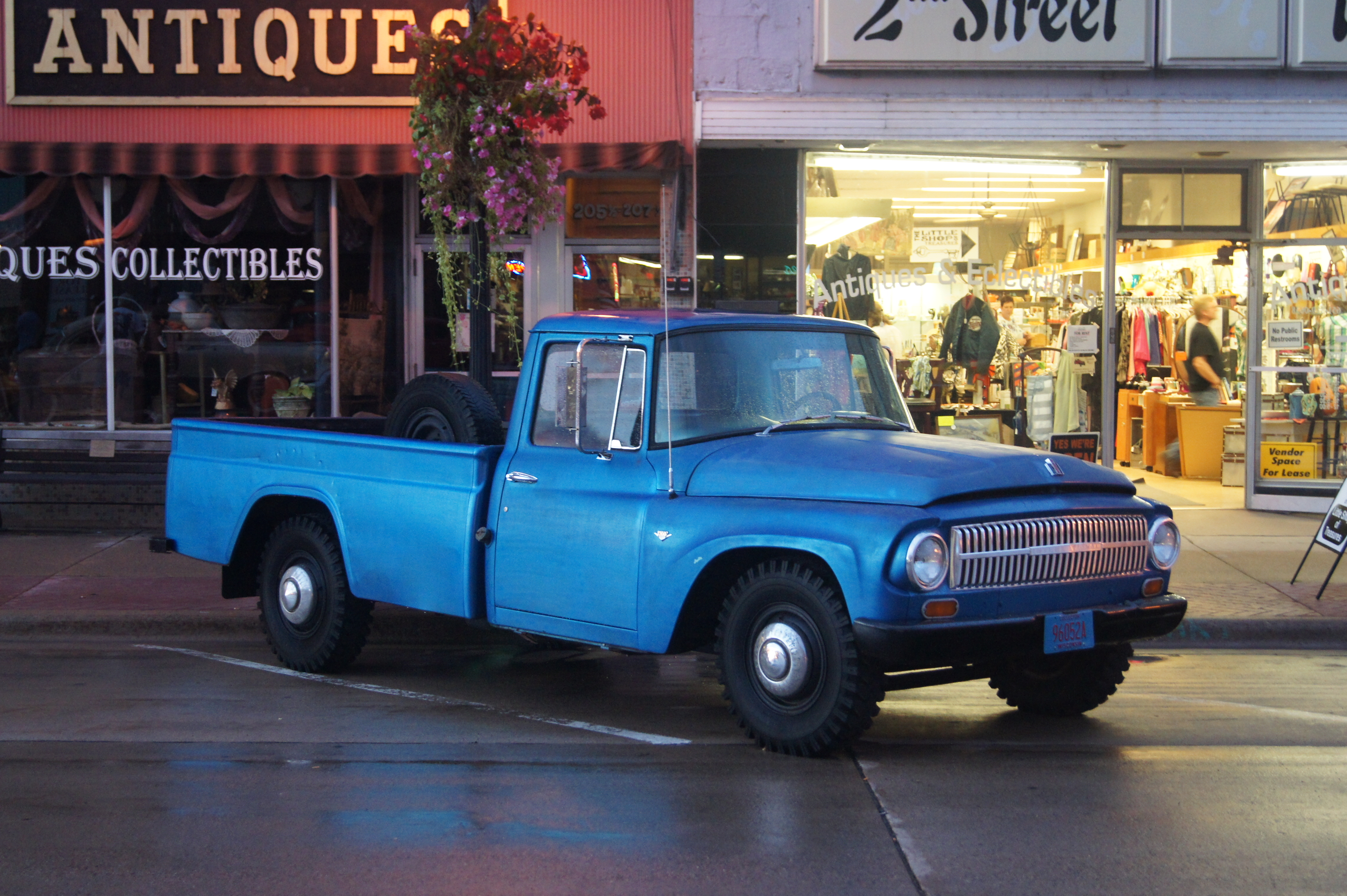
- International 1200A pickup (1966)

Overview
- Type: Pickup truck
- Manufacturer: International Harvester
- Also called: International D series; International Number Line
- Production: 1961–1968

Body and chassis
- Body style: 2-door regular cab 4-door crew cab ("Travelette")
- Layout: Front engine, rear-wheel drive; four-wheel drive
- Related: International Travelall

Powertrain
- Transmission: 3/4-speed manual; 2-speed automatic

Dimensions
- Wheelbase: 107–156 in (2,718–3,962 mm)
- Curb weight: 4,000–8,800 lb (1,814–3,992 kg)

Chronology
- Predecessor: International B series
- Successor: International Light Line pickup

The International C series and its succeeding models is a series of pickup trucks that were built by International Harvester from 1961 to 1968. They succeeded the earlier B-series range.

== History ==
In 1961, the C-series trucks appeared as well as the four-door (crew-cab) Travelette. At first this would seem to have been another facelift, featuring a modernized front end, but it also meant a whole new chassis with all new independent front torsion bar suspension. The new chassis and suspension allowed for the cab to be mounted four inches lower, meaning an even bigger transmission tunnel hump but also a more car-like ride. The standard pickup bed was joined by a straight-sided “Bonus-Load” bed. There was also a utility "workshop" version.

The most obvious visual differences were that the twin headlights were now mounted side-by-side, and a new grille of a concave egg-crate design. This front end was produced from 1961 to 1962 before going to one headlight on each side of a re-designed grill starting in 1963. The wheelbase was longer, as the front wheels were mounted further forward. This increased the front clearance angle in spite of the lower body. The range was C-100 to C-130, the heavier duty versions of the B-series were not replaced as the C-series gross vehicle weight rating now only went from 4,200 to 8,800 lb (1,900 to 4,000 kg). The 1961 International Harvester C-series Travelette was the first American-made four-door, four-wheel-drive production pickup truck.

The pickups continued to undergo a continuous stream of minor modifications to the grilles and headlight fitment. For model years 1963 and 1964, the renamed range (C-900 to C-1500) received single headlights and a new, convex version of the eggcrate grille. For 1965 the name became the D series, followed by the 900A-1500A in 1966, 908B-1500B for the next year, and the last year (1968) which was unsurprisingly called 908C-1500C, depending on weight rating. The Travelall range underwent the same changes as did the light trucks, in April 1961. The C-100/C-110 Travelall now rode on a 119-inch chassis. Similar to the Travelall was a four-door panel van, with glazing for the front doors only.

The light C900 was new for 1964: sitting on an extra short wheelbase of 107 in (2,720 mm), fitted with the Scout's four-cylinder, 152-4 engine producing 93.4 hp (70 kW) and with minimal equipment; it was designed to compete with low-cost import trucks which became briefly popular before the introduction of the Chicken Tax. It was originally sold without a bed and with a black painted front bumper. A 6-foot standard bed was an available option, as were a rear bumper, a heater, and a passenger side sun visor. The 900 did not sell overly well; 6,293 of the C- and D-900 were built in three years, followed by 1,235 of the 900A in 1966. For 1967 the four was replaced with International's 266 cu in (4.4 L) V8 engine producing 154.8 hp (115 kW), rather than the overworked four, and given the name 908B (6,531 built, followed by 3,656 908C for model year 1968). The wheelbase was stretched to 115 in (2,920 mm), and the bed was longer as well, at 6 ft 8 in (2,030 mm). For the 908, either a Standard or a Bonus-Load (fleetside) bed was on offer. The 908B was advertised as "the lowest priced V-8 pickup truck in the field."

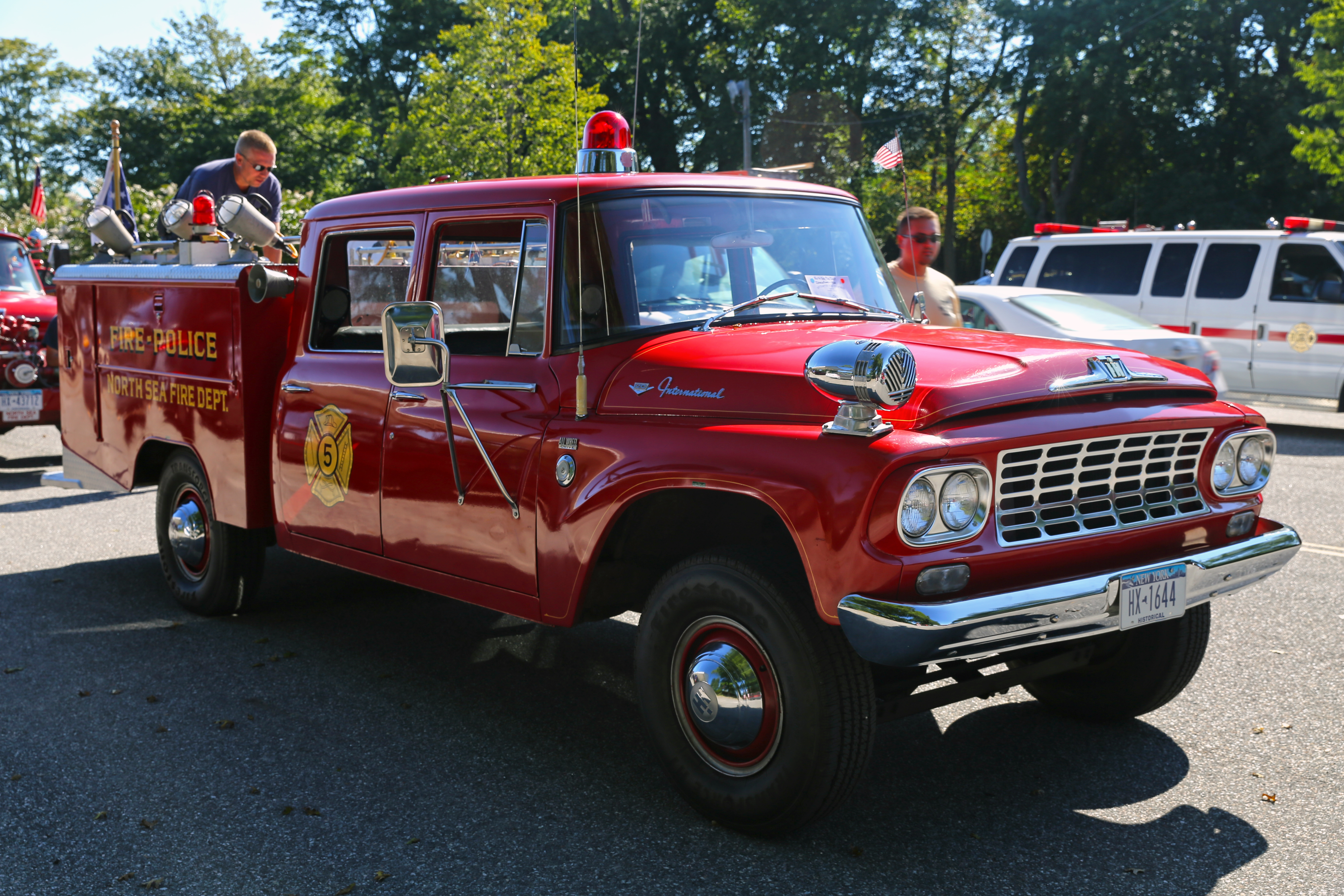
1962 International C-120 utility fire truck

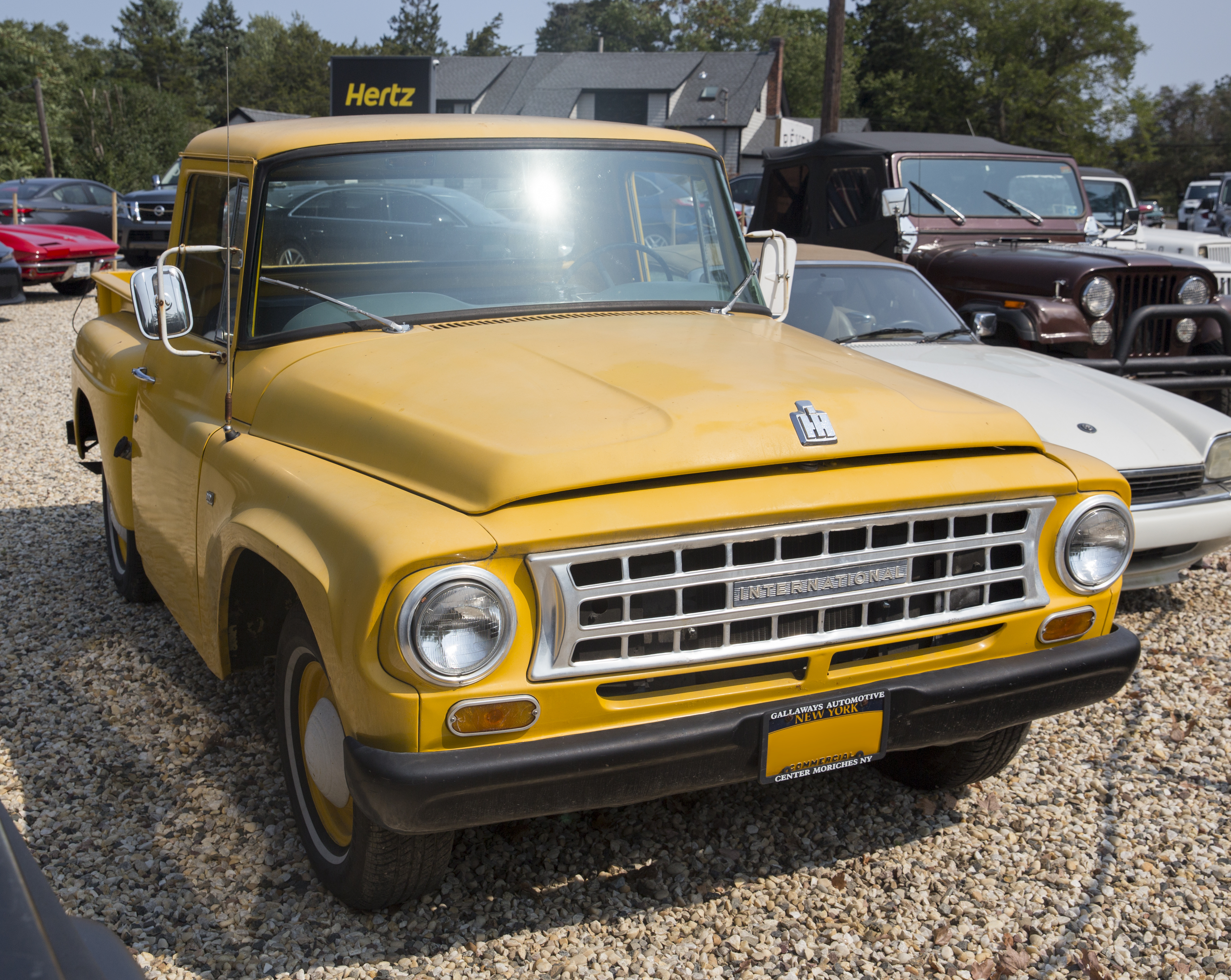
1963-1964 International C-900

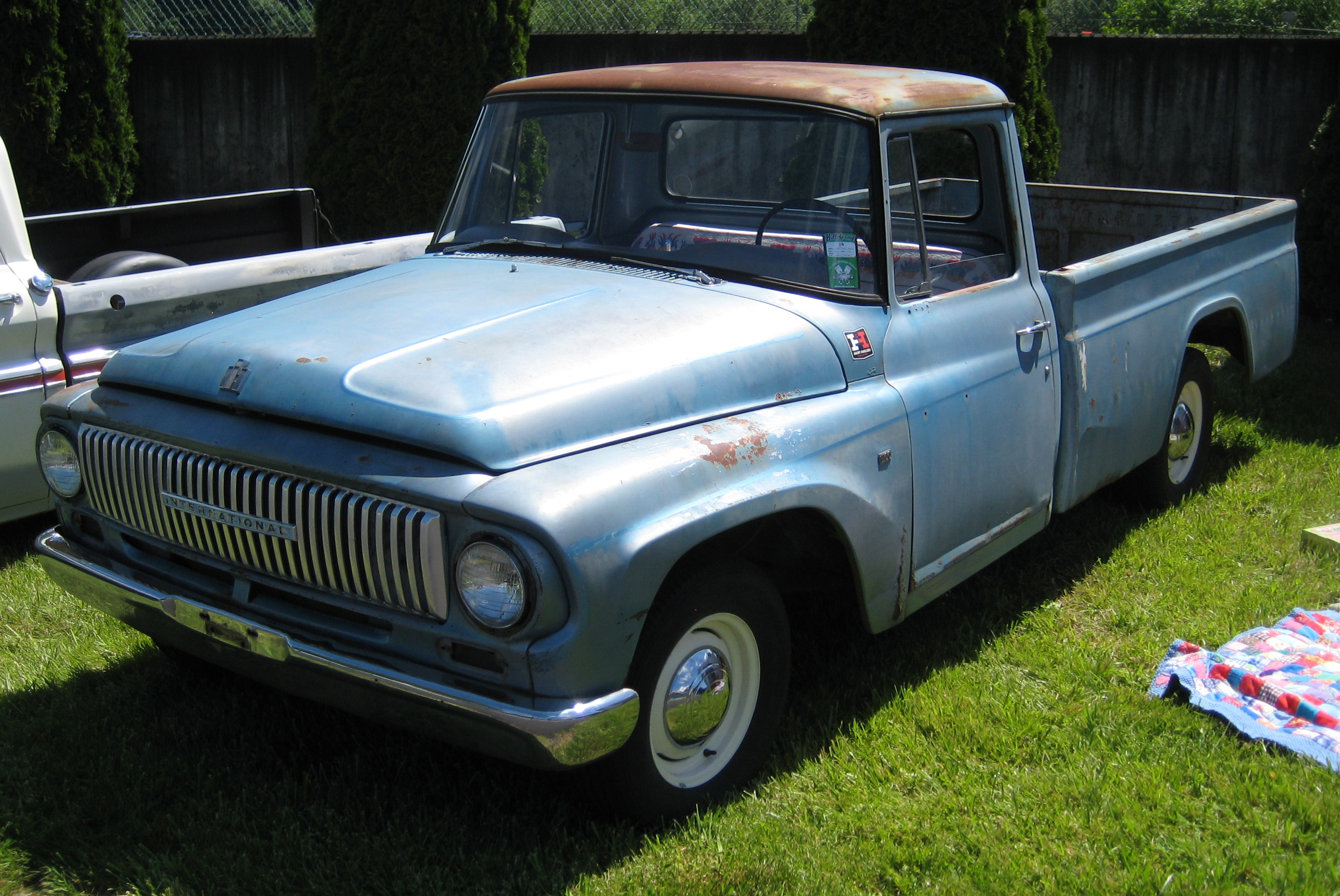
1965 International D1100 pickup

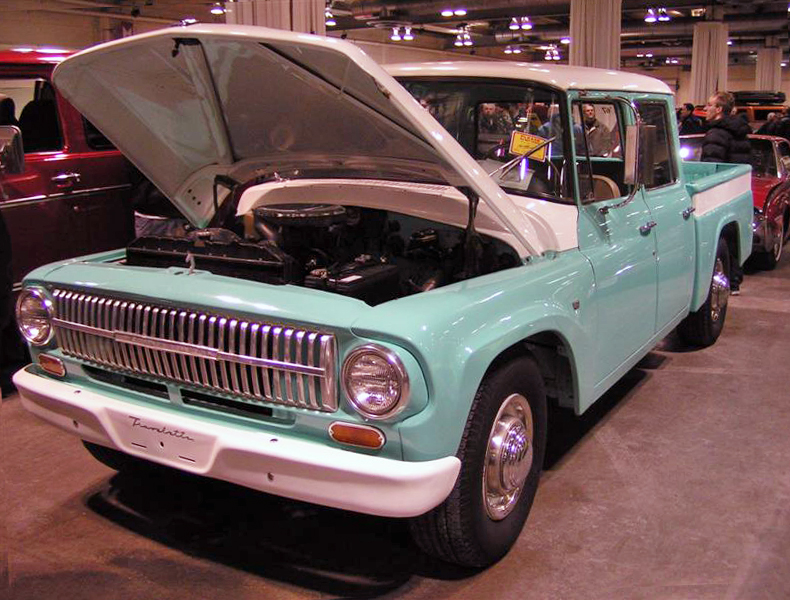
1966 International Travelette (crew cab) 1100/1200/1300A

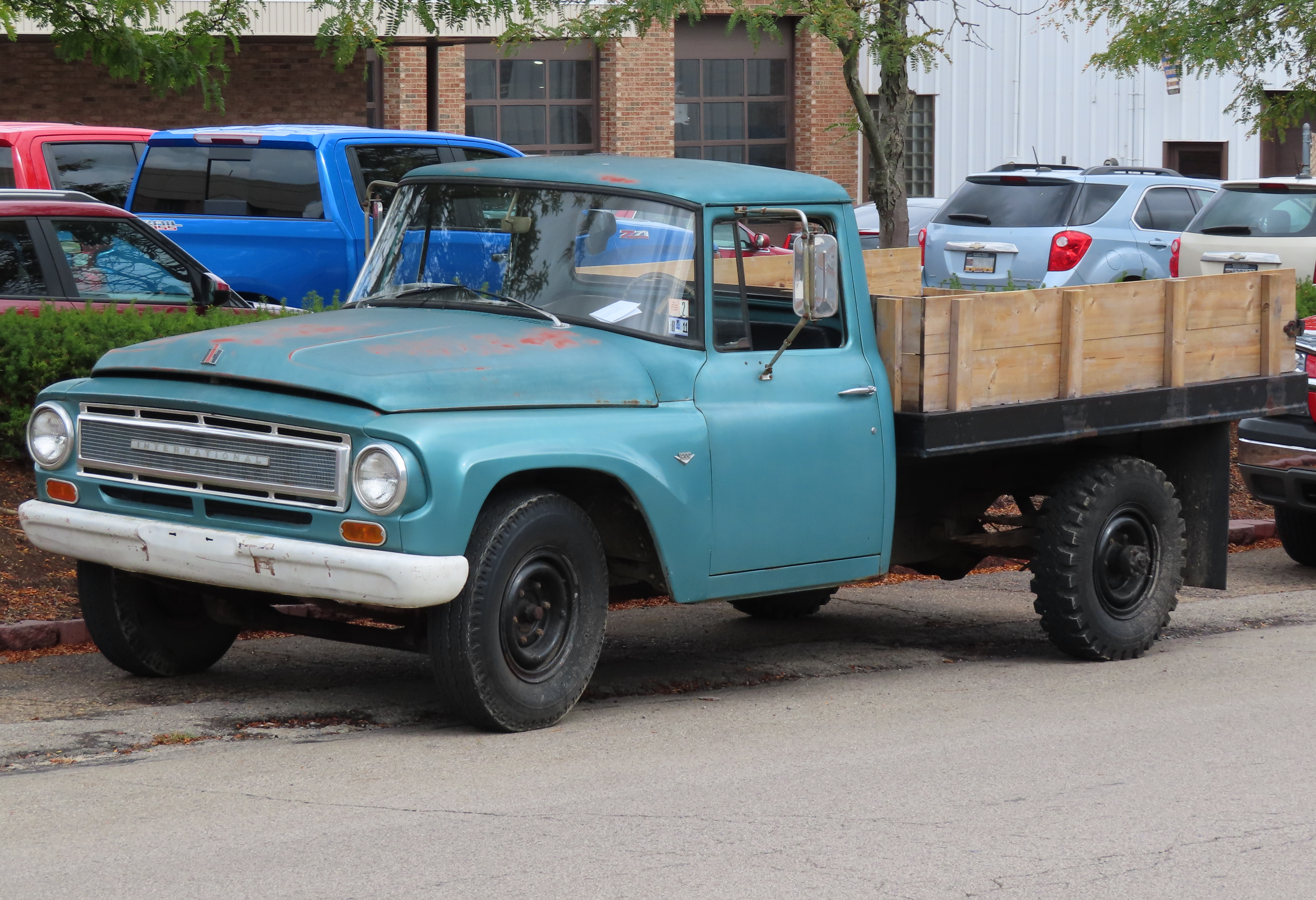
1967 International Harvester 1200B flatbed

== Engines ==
New for 1968 was the option of AMC's 232 cubic inch inline-six engine, rather than International's own BG-series six. The Travelall was considered a version of the light-duty pickup range, rather than a separate model, until major changes to the bodywork took place in 1969 for the 1970 model year. While completely different in appearance and now looking very similar to the Scout, the resulting D series continued this naming convention until the 1971 Light Line pickups were introduced.

Between 1963 and 1968, buyers could also specify International's new D301 diesel engine. This model was not advertised and was only available to special order; only a small number (a few hundreds at most) were produced. This 301 cu in (4,926 cc) inline-six produced a maximum power of 112.5 hp gross (84 kW) at 3,000 rpm and 228 lb⋅ft (309 N⋅m) at 1,600 rpm.

== See also ==
- International Harvester § Light duty trucks
- List of International Harvester vehicles
