= International Travelette =

American light-duty pickup truck

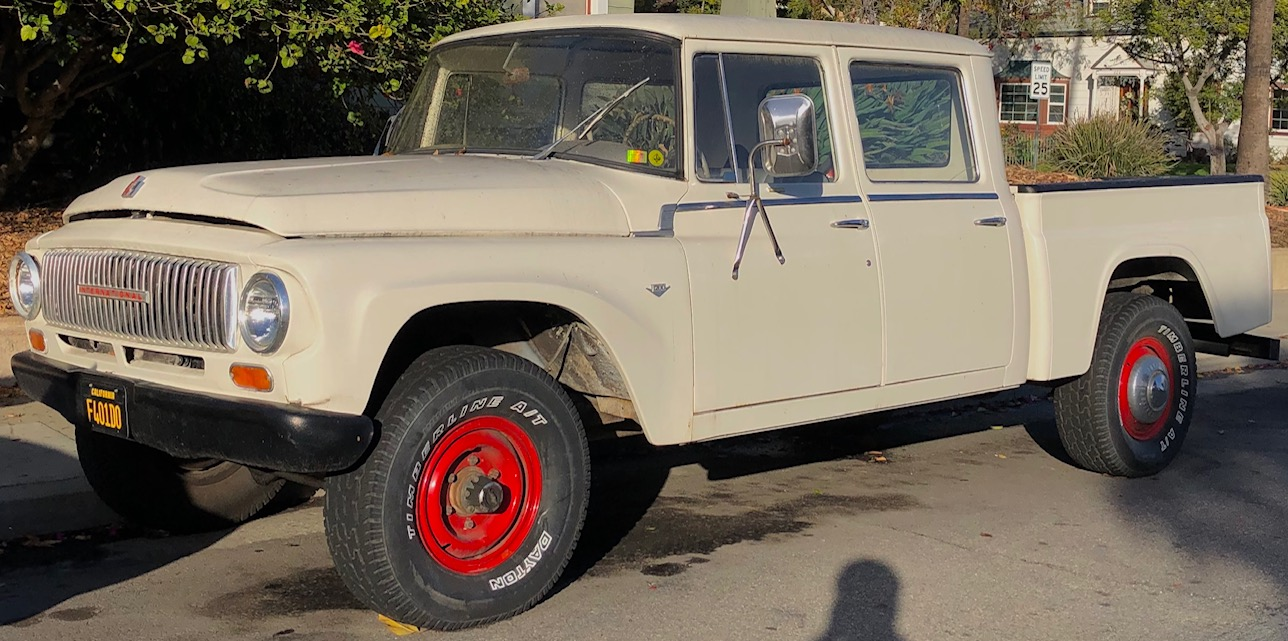
- 1965 D-1000 Travelette

Overview
- Manufacturer: International Harvester
- Also called: Travelette
- Production: 1957–1975

Body and chassis
- Body style: 3-door crew cab (1957–1960); 4-door crew cab (1961–1975)
- Related: International Travelall; International Light Line; International A/B series International C/D series

Dimensions
- Length: 237.2 inches (6.02 m)
- Width: 78.8 inches (2.00 m)
- Height: 72.8 inches (1.85 m)

The Travelette is a pickup truck that was manufactured by International Harvester from 1957 to 1975. The first American pickup truck with the crew cab configuration produced by the factory, the model was developed to increase the capability of the vehicle for carrying both passengers and cargo.

The Travelette is part of the International Light Line, using ¾-ton and 1-ton chassis. Deriving its cab structure from the International Travelall wagon, the model line was initially produced with a three-door cab, changing to a four-door cab for 1961. As with its two-door counterpart, the Travelette was offered with either a rear-wheel drive or a 4x4 drivetrain.

International Harvester assembled the Travelette alongside the Travelall and the rest of its Light Line pickup trucks at its Springfield Assembly Plant (Springfield, Ohio). Following the 1975 discontinuation of its full-size pickup truck line, International introduced its Scout II Terra pickup truck. The ancestor of the modern mid-size pickup, the Scout II Terra was offered solely with a two-door cab.

== History ==
=== 3-door cab (A/B series) ===
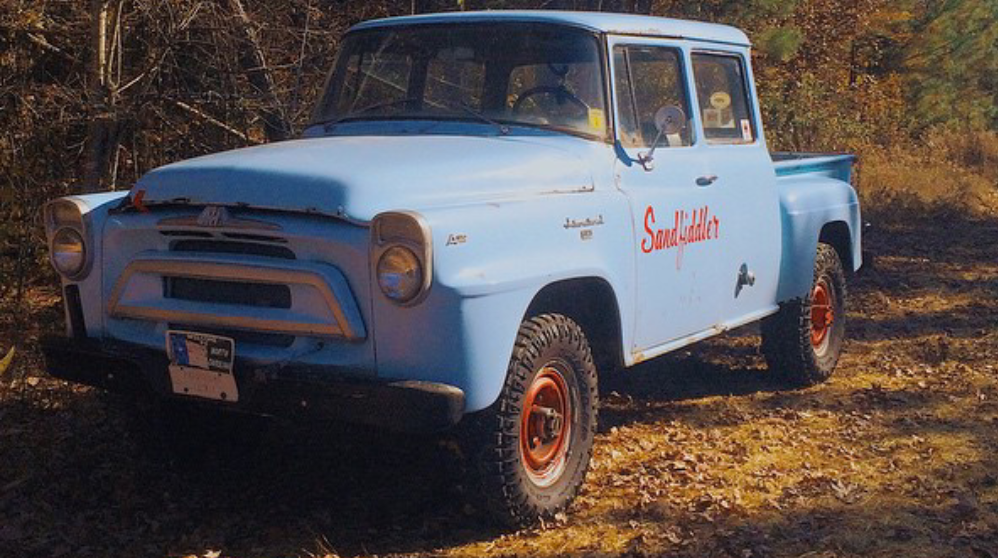
1958 A-120 Travelette 4x4 (showing three-door cab)

International introduced the Travelette for 1957 production. Based on the newly introduced A series pickup truck, the Travelette added a rear seat to the cab by using the body structure of the Travelall wagon (analogous to the full-size SUVs of today), including its second passenger-side door. To allow for a full-size pickup truck bed, the wheelbase of the Travelette was extended to 126 inches (3.2 m). As with the standard International pickup truck and the Travelall wagon, the Travelette was offered with both rear-wheel drive and 4-wheel drive.

Alongside the Travelall wagon, the Travelette crew cab followed the development of International light-duty pickup trucks, with International introducing the lightly updated B-Series pickups for 1959.

=== 4-door cab (C/D series, Light Line) ===
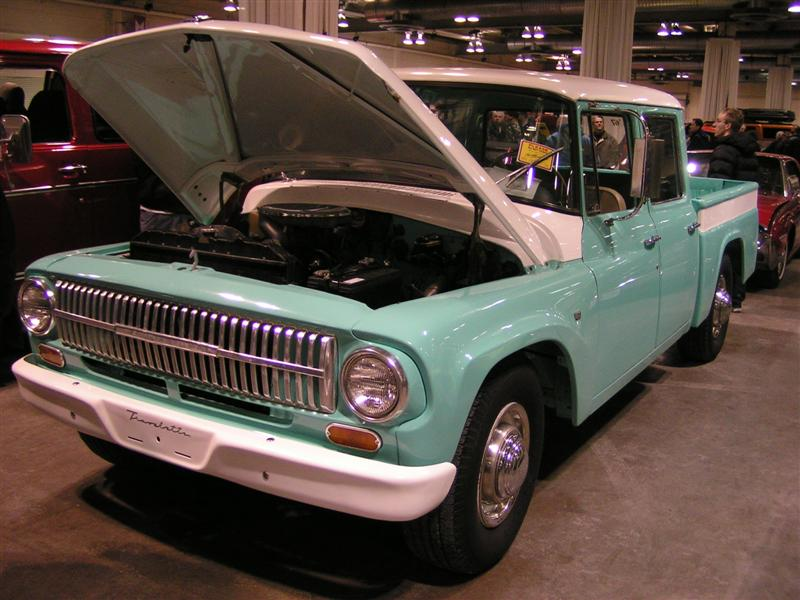
1966 Travelette in its original design

For 1961, International introduced the redesigned C-series pickups. While the cab shared its structure with the A/B series, in a major design change, a driver-side rear door was added, giving the Travelette four sedan-style doors. While marketed under the Travelette name, the official model designation would change multiple times through the mid-1960s.

For 1969, the Travelette underwent a redesign, as International introduced its Light Line pickups. Offered in 149-inch (3.8 m) and 164-inch (4.2 m) wheelbases (dependent on pickup bed length), the Light Line Travelette received an all-new cab design (the first complete redesign of the cab since 1957). For 1974, the four-wheel drive configuration was discontinued, and the front suspension was redesigned.

=== Discontinuation ===
Marketed primarily as a work vehicle, the model line struggled to compete against the more widely available pickup trucks from Dodge, Ford, and General Motors. Following the 1973 fuel crisis, sales of International light-duty vehicles collapsed, as the Light Line (pickup, Travelall, Travelette) trucks were far heavier and less fuel-efficient than its "Big Three" counterparts. Shifting its light-duty resources entirely towards the more competitive International Scout off-road vehicle, International ended sales of all three Light Line vehicles after the 1975 model year, ending sales of non-commercial automobiles entirely after the 1980 model year.

After the 1980 discontinuation of the Scout II Terra, International exited light-duty pickup production entirely to focus on medium and heavy-duty trucks. From 2004 to 2008, International Harvester's successor company Navistar produced the XT series pickup trucks. (By far) the largest pickup truck ever sold for retail sale in the United States, the CXT and RXT was derived from the medium-duty 7000 and 4000 series (today the HV and MV) and the MXT was derived from their military variant. These pickups were sold nearly exclusively in a crew-cab configuration.

== Legacy ==
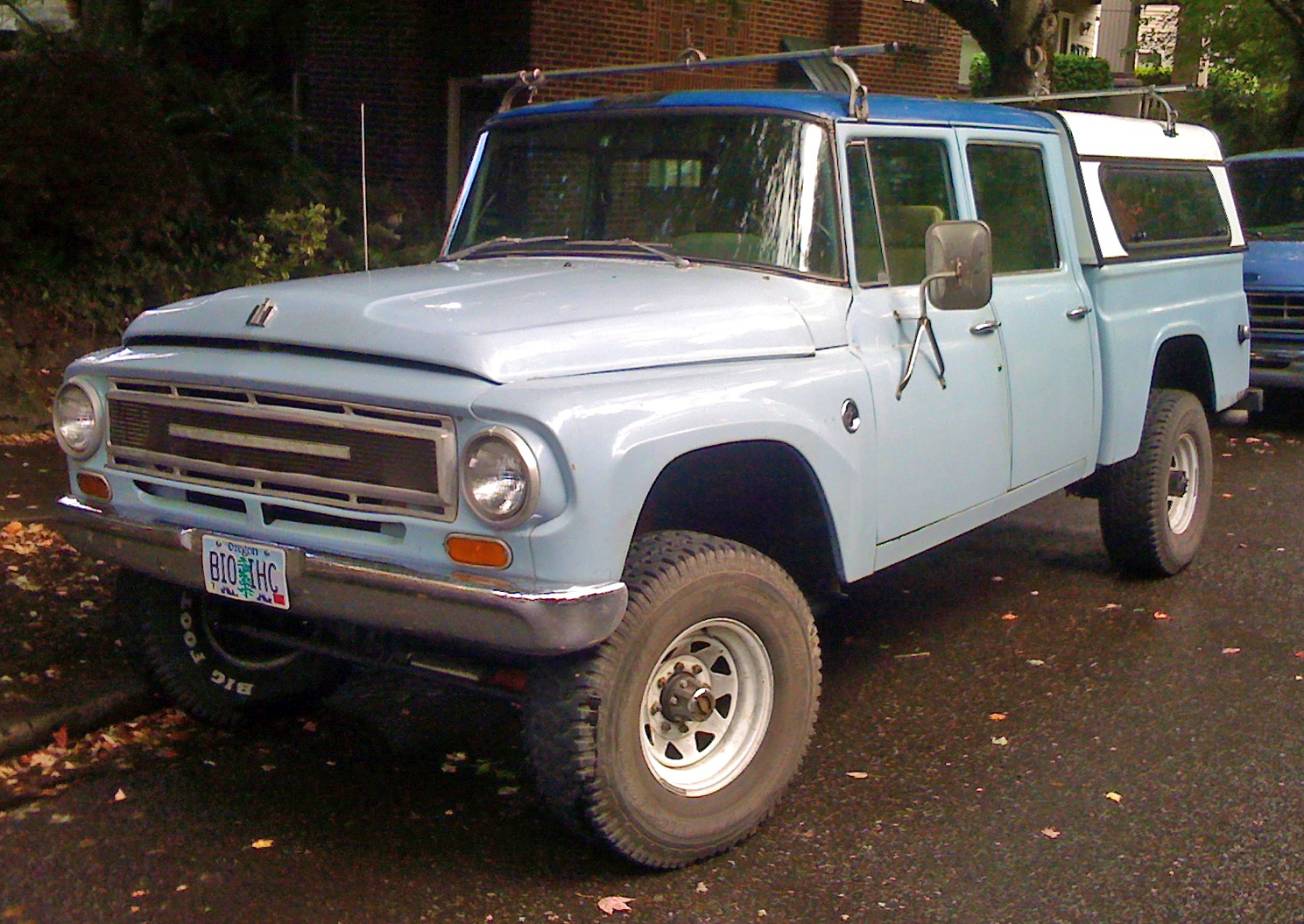
1967 Travelette 1200B 4x4

Designed effectively as a hybrid of the International light-duty pickup truck and its Travelall wagon (SUV), the Travelette was the first factory-produced pickup truck with two rows of seating, later becoming the first pickup truck with four sedan-style doors. The design was adopted by competitive manufacturers, as Dodge and Ford introduced their own crew-cab pickups in 1963 and 1965, respectively. General Motors followed suit in 1973; in a fashion similar to International, their crew-cab pickup design was derived from a truck-based wagon (today, SUV). During the late 1970s, Japanese manufacturers would introduce crew-cab pickup trucks of their own (trading shortened bed length for a four-door cab); while popular in markets around the world, four-door compact pickup trucks would not be introduced in North America until the late 1990s.

The original 1957-1960 three-door Travelette became a precursor of an additional type of pickup truck design feature. During the 1970s, American manufacturers introduced two-door extended-cab pickup trucks, sized between two-door standard-cab and four-door crew cab pickup trucks. In contrast to work-oriented crew cab trucks, extended cab trucks were marketed for both work and personal use; a rear folding seat was available for extra seating or for storage, accessed by folding the front seats forward. The Light Line was never developed as an extended cab, but Dodge and Ford would introduce the Club Cab and Super Cab in 1973 and 1974, respectively (GM would do so in 1988). In the late 1990s, rear passenger doors made their returns on extended-cab pickups; initially introduced as rear-hinged doors, front-hinged doors were introduced during the 2010s (effectively creating a shorter-length crew cab).

== See also ==
- List of International Harvester vehicles
- International Travelall
- International Light Line pickup
