= International Light Line pickup =

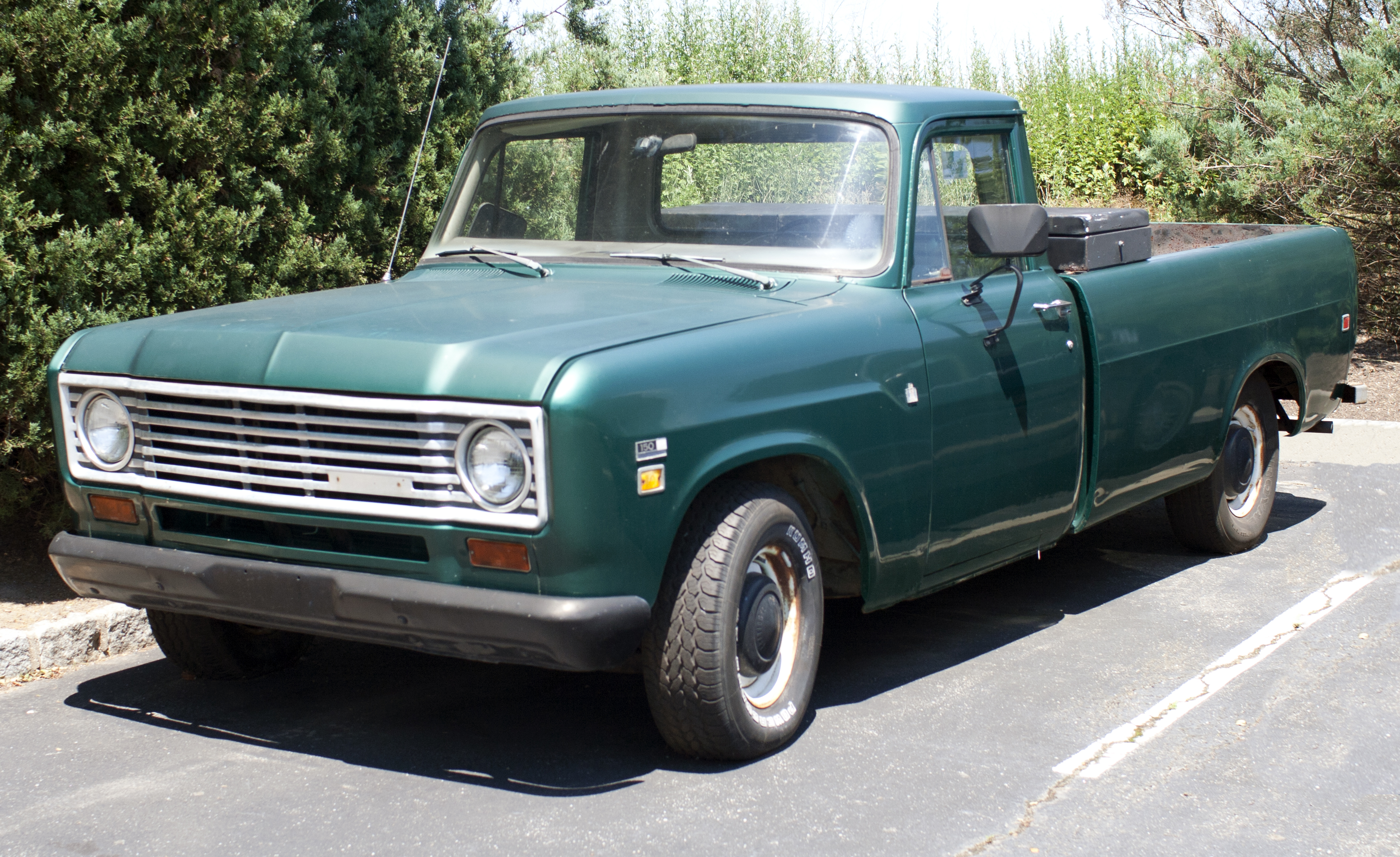
- International 150 (1974-1975)

Overview
- Type: Pickup truck
- Manufacturer: International Harvester
- Also called: Dina D-1000 (1974-1976)
- Production: 1969-1975

Body and chassis
- Class: Mid-size pickup truck
- Body style: 2-door regular cab 4-door crew cab ("Travelette")
- Layout: Front engine, rear-wheel drive four-wheel drive
- Related: International Travelall

Powertrain
- Engine: 232 cu in (3.8 L) 6-232 I6 (AMC); 258 cu in (4.2 L) 6-258 I6 (AMC); 266 cu in (4.4 L) SV-266 V8; 304 cu in (5.0 L) SV-304 V8; 345 cu in (5.7 L) SV-345 V8; 392 cu in (6.4 L) SV-392 V8; 401 cu in (6.6 L) V-400 V8 (AMC)
- Transmission: 3/4/5-speed manual; 3-speed Borg Warner automatic; 3-speed Chrysler 727 automatic (1973-1975)

Dimensions
- Wheelbase: 115–166 in (2,921–4,216 mm)
- Length: 203.9 in (5,179 mm)
- Width: 77.6 in (1,971 mm)
- Curb weight: 4,000–6,000 lb (1,814–2,722 kg)

Chronology
- Predecessor: International C series

The International Light Line pickups (also called the International D-Series (1000–1500)) replaced the C series as International's Light Line range of pickup trucks in early 1969, for a shortened model year. The name started out as a simple continuation of the previous A-, B-, and C-series trucks. It was largely a rebodied version of its predecessors, with a square-rigged look very similar to the contemporaneous Scout utility vehicle. The Travelall underwent parallel changes to the Light Line trucks. The light line of trucks was marked by a larger range of transmission and wheelbase options than any of its competitors, and in general the lineup aimed to maximize adaptability. The Light Line was also available as a bare chassis, for special purpose applications. Production ended in late April 1975, as a hard-pressed International chose to focus on the Scout and on heavier machinery.

== 1000D-Series ==
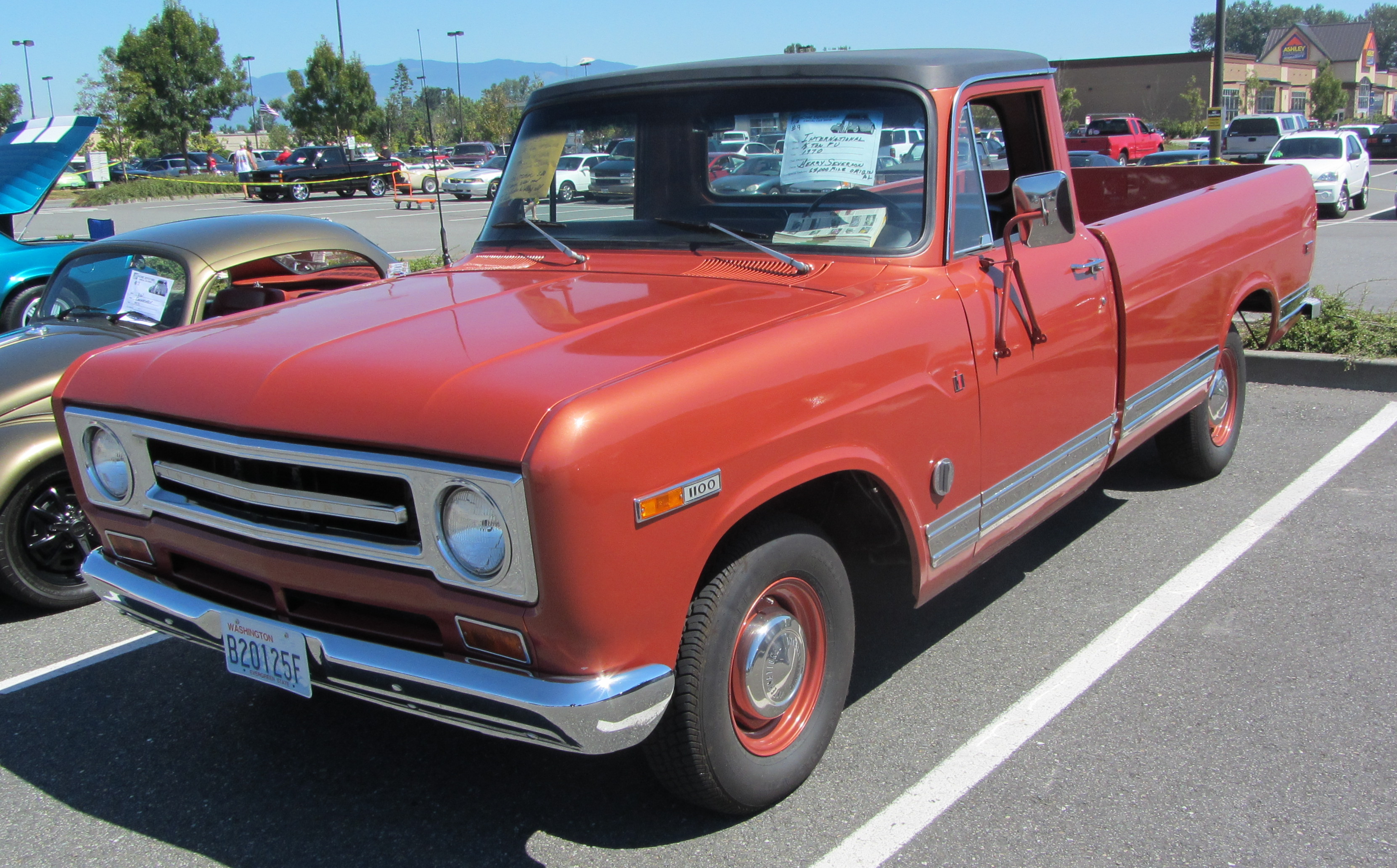
International 1100D (1970)

Sold as the 1000 through 1500 D-series, the Light Line pickup was originally offered with four of International Harvester's own V8s, with displacements of 266, 304, 345 or 392 cubic inches. AMC's 232 ci inline-six engine had also been available, since the 1968 C-Series. Several different wheelbases (115, 119, 131, 132, 149, 156, or 164 inches) were also offered. The 119 inch version (as used for the Travelall) was only available as a bare chassis. In addition to the regular cab pickup, station wagon "Travelall" bodywork was also available, as was a four-door panel van version of the wagon and a four-door pickup called the "Travelette" (only on the 149 or 164 inch wheelbase). The standard transmission was a three-speed manual with a column shift, but there were also four- and five-speed manuals and a three-speed automatics, with floor-mounted shifters optional. The automatic transmission was not available in heavier duty models such as the 1300D and the rare 1500D. Several models were also available as a cab on a bare frame for construction of stake-bed or other applications, some with an optional dual-wheel rear end, with available load ratings up to seven tons. These larger models were not popular, with most buyers opting instead for the Loadstar models.

== 1010-Series ==
For 1971 the Light Line underwent a slight styling change, now with a plastic grille. The naming system also changed, with the "D" being dropped and with a "10" being added in the series number. Thus, the new trucks were labelled 1010 through 1510, depending on weight ratings. The engine range was the same as for the earlier pickups, although AMC's 258 six was added later in 1971. The smaller 232 was dropped for 1972, as was the 266 V8 which had still been available in early 1971. From that year on a metal grille with five horizontal bars and a slim central vertical opening was installed instead of the previous plastic unit. As IH's own engines were temporarily in short supply due to the success of the Loadstar medium-duty truck, some 1973 and 1974 pickup trucks received AMC's 401 ci V8 engine instead (called the V-400 on International's option list). The crew cab Travelette was only available on the 1210 series.

The 1010 and 1110 have the same weight rating, the difference being in the front suspension: independent, by torsion-bars, for the 1010, and of a solid I-beam construction for the 1110 (and all heavier versions). A first for the segment was the option of a Bendix anti-lock brake system called Adaptive Braking System by International. Operating only on the rear wheels, it was made available the pickups (and Travelalls) in late 1971. Due to the expense of this novel system, it was a rarely selected option.

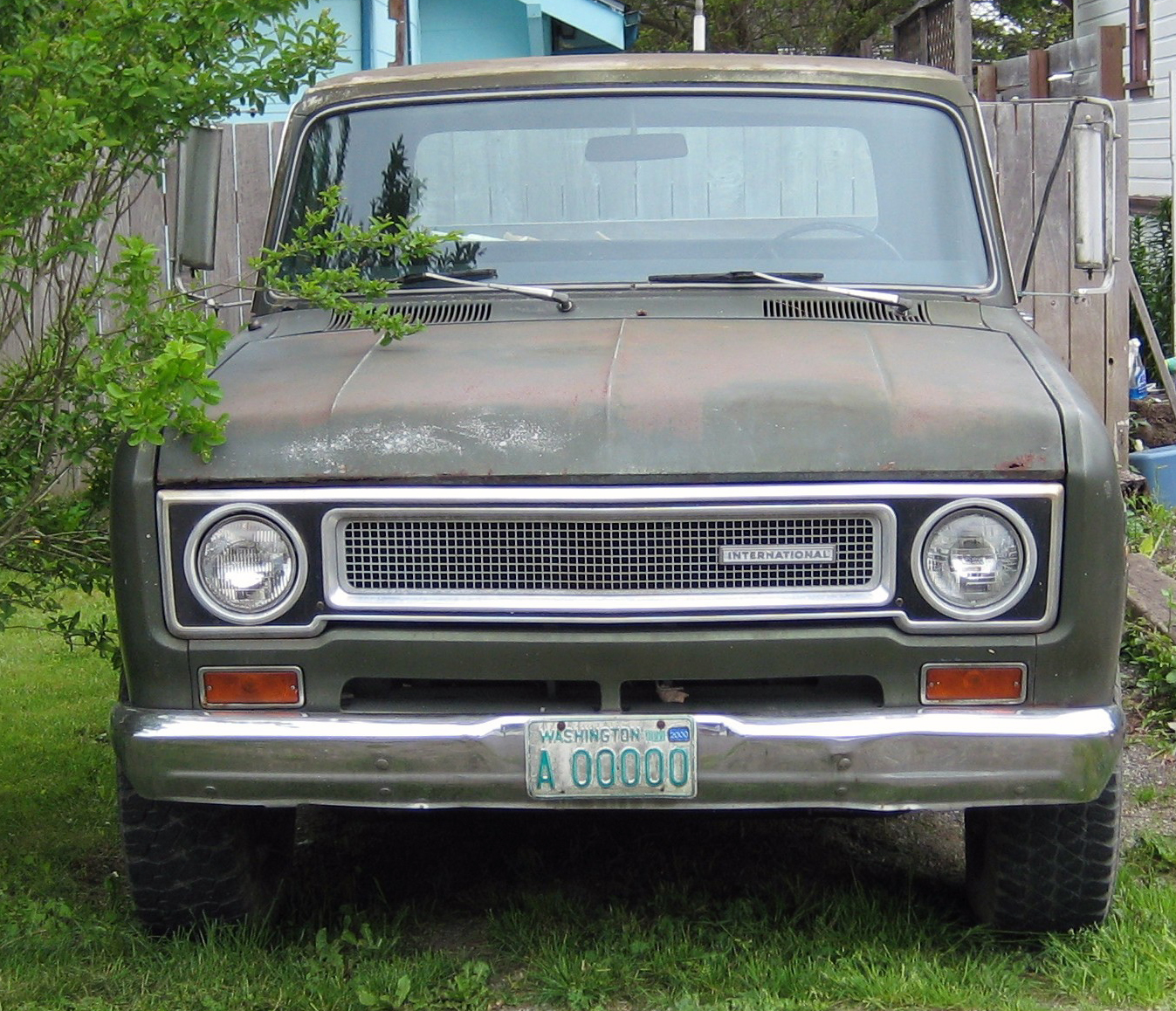
1971 International 1010-series pickup, with plastic grille

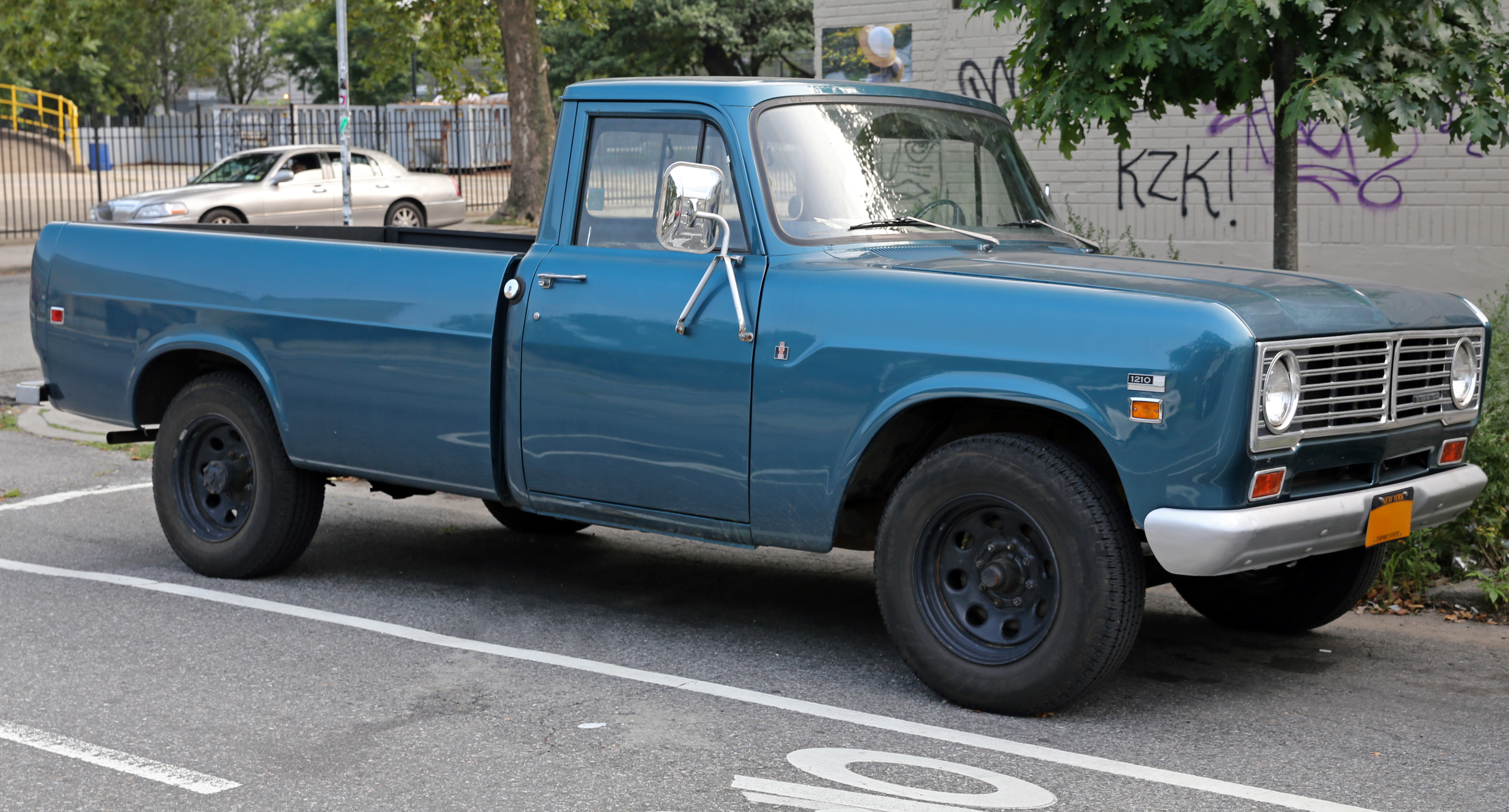
1973 International 1210, facelift version with metal grille

== 100-series ==
For 1974 the naming changed yet again: the trucks were now called 100, 150, 200, or 500 depending on the weight rating. External changes were minimal, consisting mainly of a new five-bar metal grille without the vertical dividers, nicknamed the "electric razor grille". The two wheel drive chassis received a revised double wishbone independent front suspension and disc brakes replacing the previous torsion bar front end. The engine and transmission was also repositioned lower and further behind the front axle centerline (in preparation for the new MV-series gas and diesel V8 engines that never actually made it into series production). The heavy duty one-ton 500 was only available as a single-cab chassis, and the ¾ ton 150 was only available with IHC's own line of V8 engines. The program was gradually whittled away. The Travelette crew cab was no longer available with four-wheel drive. Only the 150, 200, and 500-Series remained by the time the 1975s were introduced. By then, only IHC's own V8s were still available, with the claimed outputs down to 141–172 hp (105–128 kW) SAE net. There were two wheelbases available for the regular cab (115 or 132 inches), and two for the Travelette (149 or 166 inches). 6.5 feet (2.0 m) and 8 feet (2.4 m) beds were available.

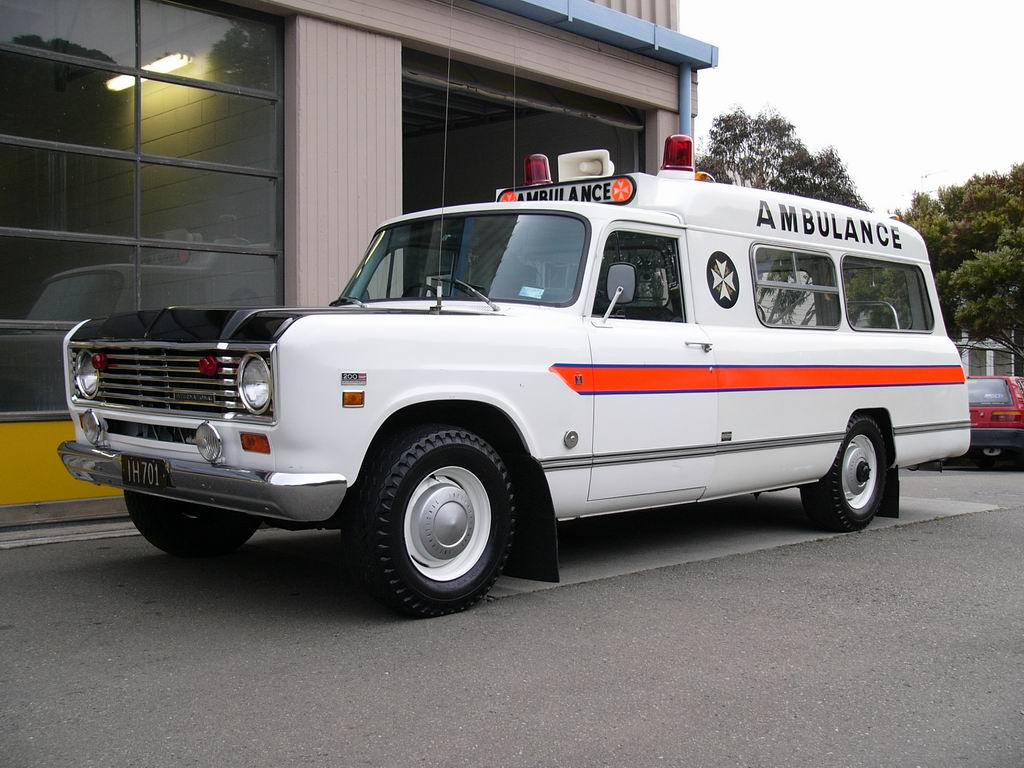
1975 International 200-based ambulance in New Zealand

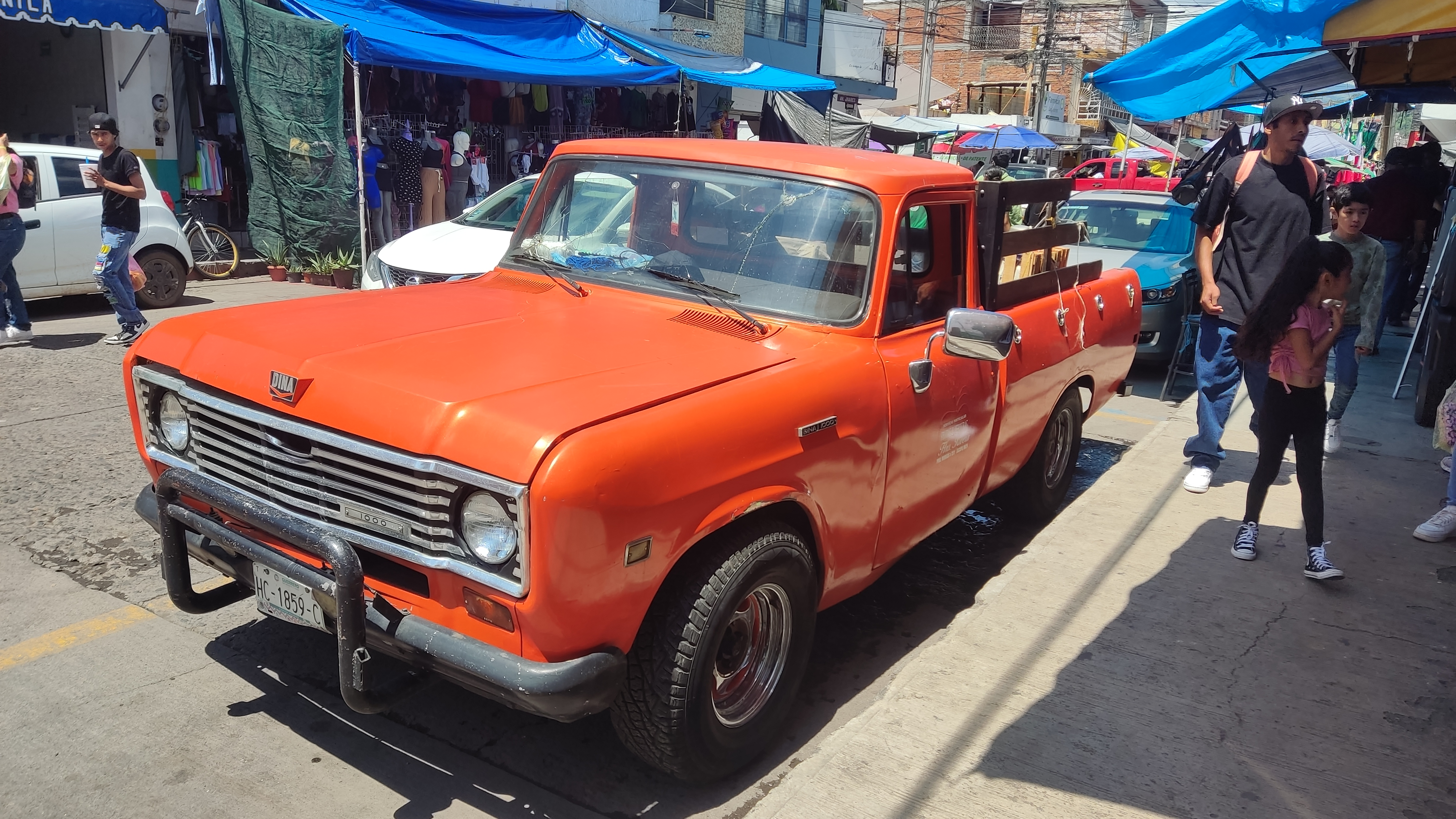
Dina D1000, manufactured under licence by DINA S.A. between 1974 and 1976

== End of production ==
Pickup (and Travelall) production ended on 5 May 1975, with only about 6,000 made. The last one built was an all-wheel drive IH 200HD cab and chassis, built in IHC's Springfield factory. The Light Line was unable to compete with the Big Three in the light truck market; IHC's market share in this segment had never been higher than 9.5% and had dropped to 4.1% by 1969. Corporate infighting and the 1973-1974 oil crisis served to further undermine International's market, meaning that the Light Line had to be discontinued in spite of the marketing efforts of recently added executive Keith Mazurek (previously of Chrysler Canada). The oil crisis particularly affected International's working trucks, which were the heaviest and least fuel efficient in the market. Another issue of concern was the truck-centered nature of International's dealers, while most competing light trucks were beginning to be sold to suburban buyers in more alluring and better located auto show rooms. International Harvester instead chose to focus on heavier trucks and the popular Scout, which continued to be built until 1980.

== See also ==
- List of International Harvester vehicles
