= International Travelall =

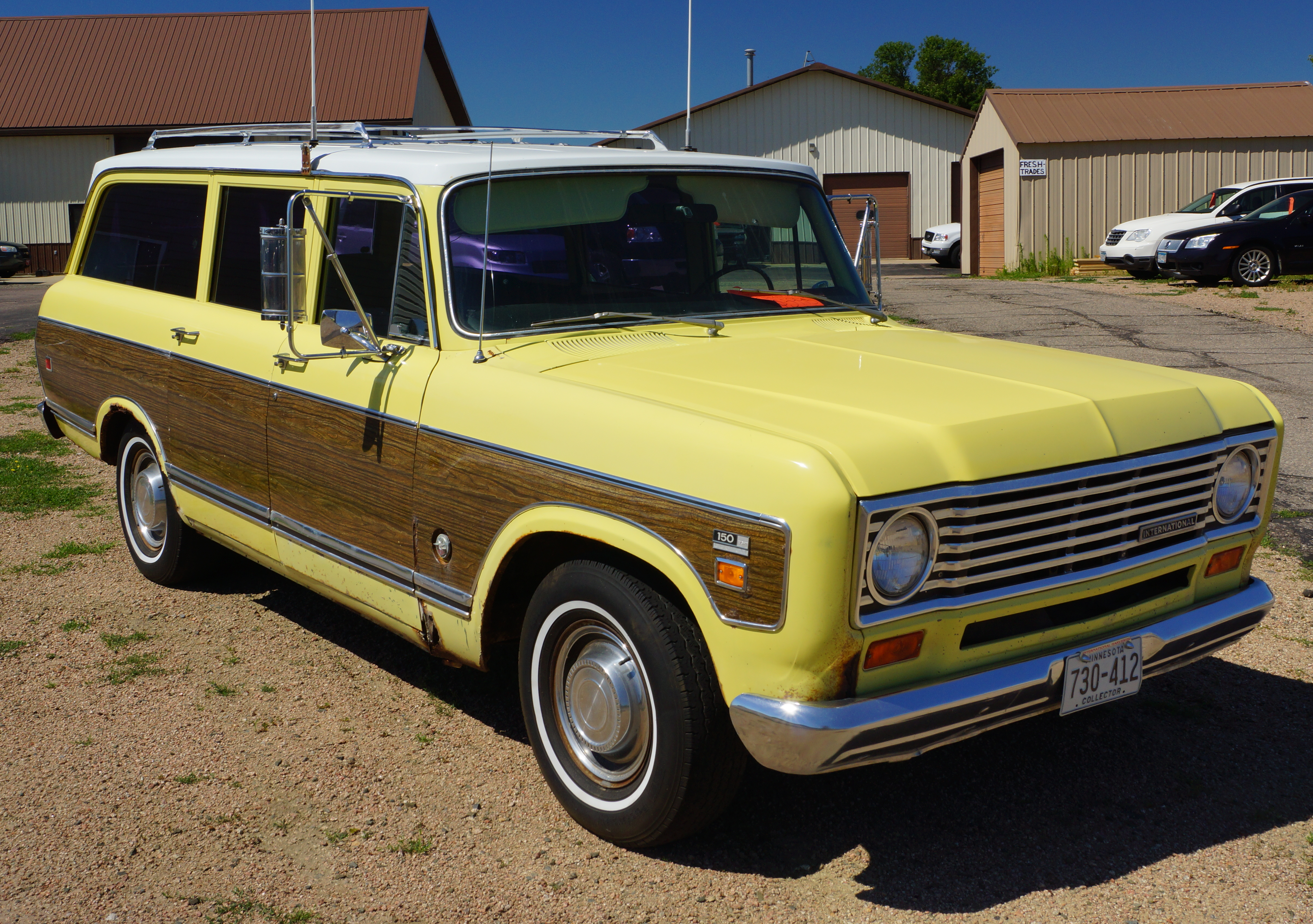
- 1975 International Travelall Custom 150

Overview
- Manufacturer: International Harvester
- Production: 1953-1975

Body and chassis
- Class: Full-size SUV
- Body style: 3/4/5-door wagon/SUV
- Layout: Front-engine, rear wheel drive; Front-engine, four wheel drive

Dimensions
- Wheelbase: 115.0 in (2,921.0 mm)

Chronology
- Predecessor: International L series

The International Travelall is a model line of vehicles that were manufactured by International Harvester from 1953 to 1975. A station wagon derived from a truck chassis, the Travelall was a forerunner of modern people carriers and full-size sport utility vehicles. Competing against the Chevrolet Suburban for its entire production, the model line was the first vehicle in the segment to offer four passenger doors.

As International did not produce passenger cars, the Travelall wagon sourced its chassis from the International pickup truck line. Following the 1961 introduction of the Scout (a precursor to off-road oriented SUVs), the Travelall continued to follow the development of the pickup truck line, competing against the slightly larger Suburban and the smaller Jeep Wagoneer.

After the 1975 model year, International Harvester ended production of the Travelall and its Light Line pickup trucks. Since the 1980 discontinuation of the Scout, International has focused its road vehicle production exclusively on medium-duty and heavy-duty commercial trucks.

== Background ==
Prior to 1953, International Harvester did not produce a station wagon as part of its model range. At the time, International truck chassis were fitted with wood station wagon bodywork on a third-party basis. Following World War II, as "woodies" were phased out in favor of all-steel bodywork, K-series panel vans served as the basis for airport people movers, adding windows and rear seats.

As a precursor to the Travelall, International began to produce the L-Series panel truck with windows and rear seats as a metal-body station wagon; the number produced and the use of the Travelall name is unknown.

Following its introduction within the R/S light truck line, the Travelall would follow the development of the International pickup truck model range. In 1958, the first rear passenger door was added (nine years before the Suburban); a fourth door was added in 1961 (2 years before the Wagoneer; 12 years before the Suburban).

For 1961, International introduced the four-door International Travelette. The first factory-produced four-door crew-cab pickup truck, the Travelette derived its bodywork from the Travelall wagon.

== First generation (1953-1957) ==
First generation (R/S Series)
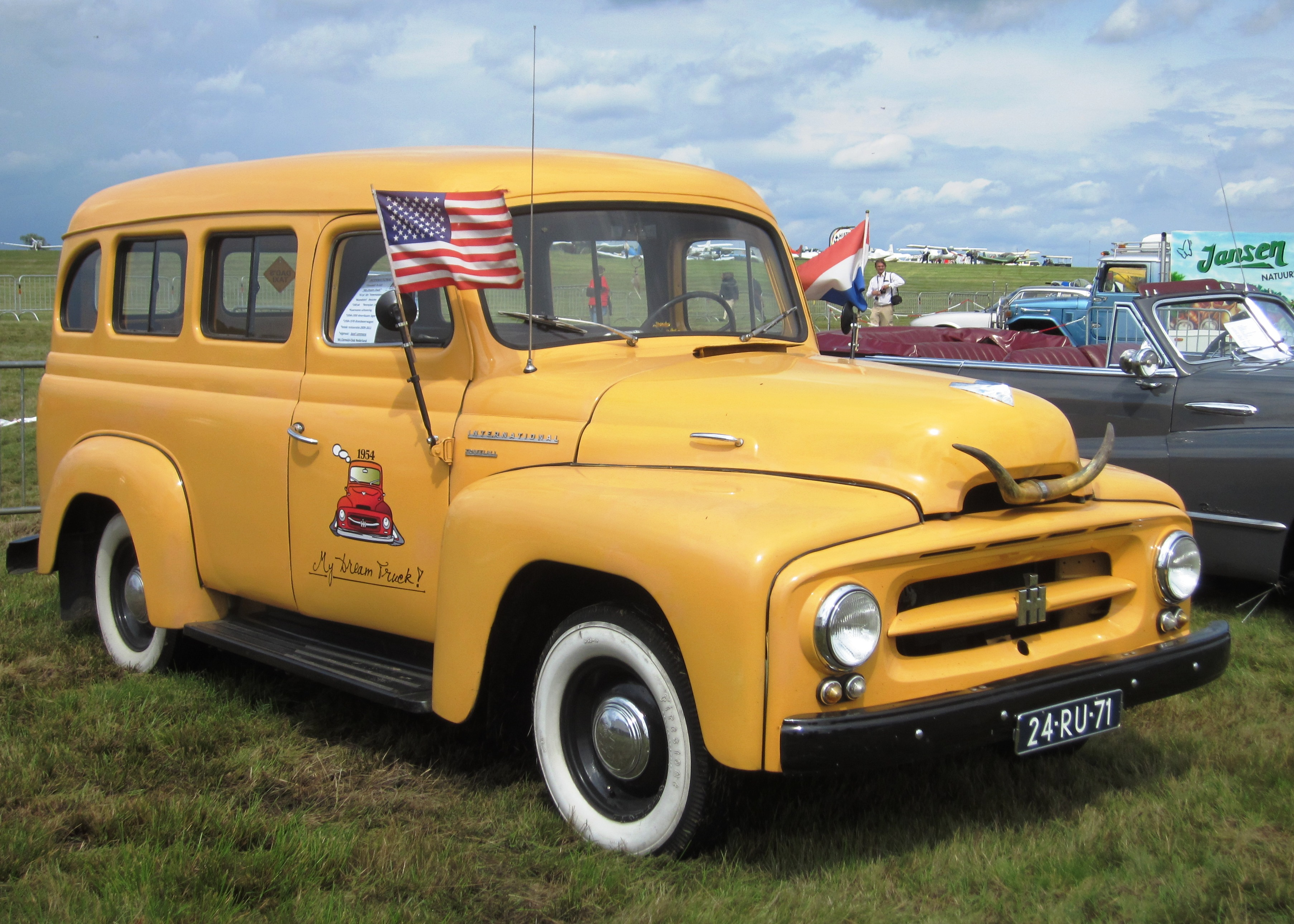
- 1954 R-110 Travelall

Overview
- Manufacturer: International Harvester
- Model years: 1953-1957

Body and chassis
- Class: Full-size SUV
- Body style: 3-door wagon
- Related: International R/S series

Powertrain
- Engine: 220 cu in (3.6 L) Silver Diamond I6

Dimensions
- Wheelbase: 115.0 in (2,921.0 mm)

In 1953, International introduced the R series truck range, replacing the L series. Alongside a comprehensive range of trucks from 1/2-ton pickups to heavy commercial trucks, International introduced the Travelall to the R-Series as a metal-bodied station wagon.

Offered on the 1/2-ton R-110 series on a 115-inch wheelbase, the first Travelall was powered by a 100 hp (75 kW), 220 cubic-inch "Silver Diamond" inline-six. Replacing wood-bodied station wagons, the Travelall was a windowed panel van fitted with either two or three rear seats. In line with sedan-based two-door station wagons of the time, access to the rear seats was gained by flipping up the passenger-side front seat. Rear twin-panel doors were standard, with a wagon-style tailgate offered as an option. To distinguish the variant from other International vehicles, a Travelall name badge was mounted on the front cowl.

In 1955, the primary International truck line became the S series, with the Travelall now offered on the S-110 or the heavier-duty S-120 ranges, with the SD 220 engine replaced by the BD 220 engine. For 1956, four-wheel drive became offered as a factory-installed option.

== Second generation (1958-1960) ==
Second generation (A/B Series)
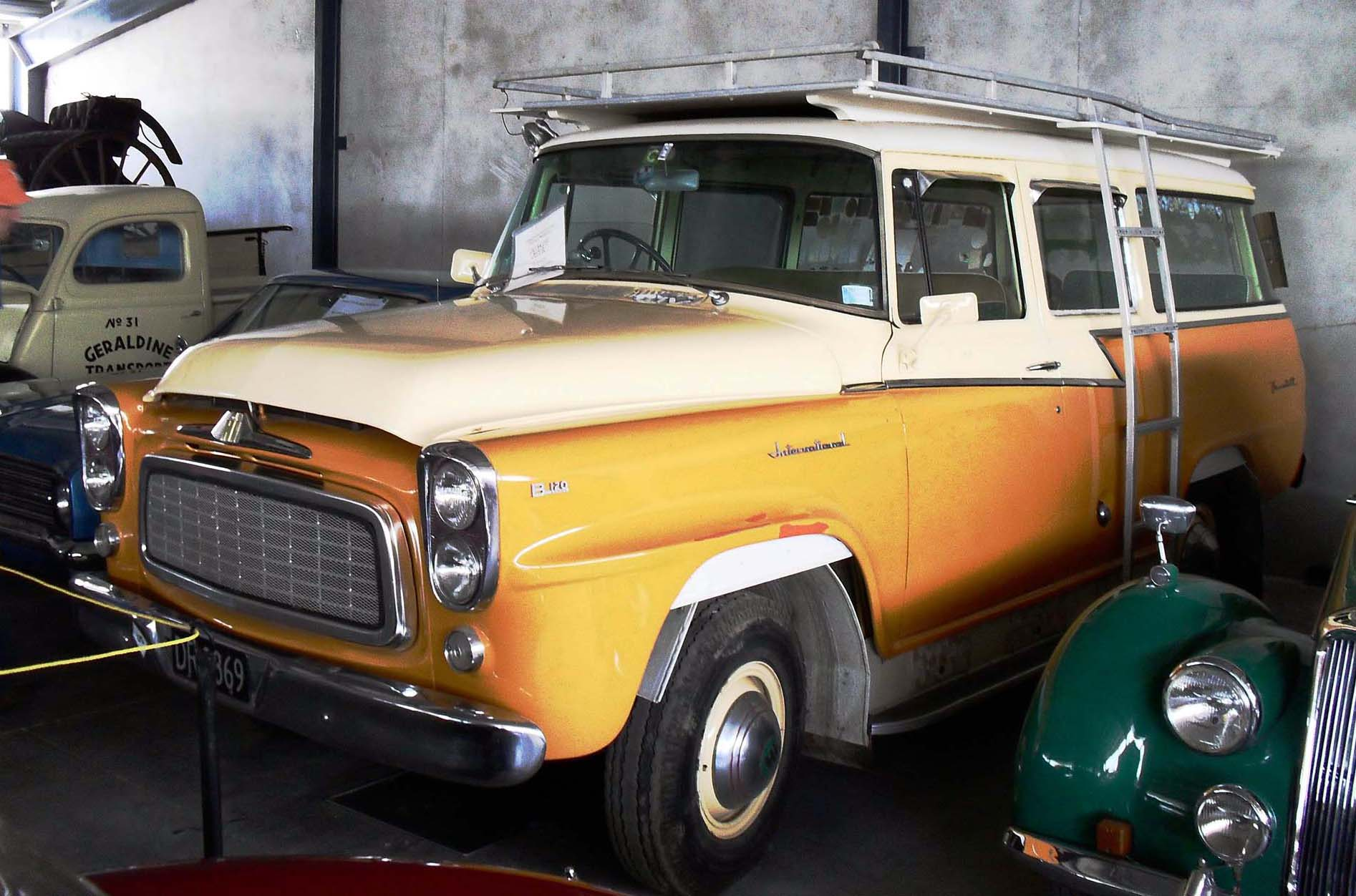
- 1959-1960 B120 Travelall

Overview
- Manufacturer: International Harvester
- Production: 1957-1960
- Model years: 1958-1960

Body and chassis
- Class: Full-size SUV
- Body style: 4-door wagon
- Related: International A/B series

Powertrain
- Engine: 220 cu in (3.6 L) Silver Diamond I6; 240 cu in (3.9 L) Silver Diamond I6

Dimensions
- Wheelbase: 115.0 in (2,921.0 mm)
- Length: 202.4 in (5,140 mm) (A-series)

Introduced during 1957, International introduced the A series trucks ("A" for Anniversary, 50 years of International Harvester truck production), introducing a full redesign of its light and medium trucks. Coinciding with the first major revisions to its exterior, the A-Series Travelall introduced a major functional change to the model line. To improve rear-seat access, a second passenger-side door was added (the location of the fuel tank fill port precluded a driver-side rear door).

The Travelall was derived from the A-100, A-110, and A-120; four-wheel drive was optional on the A-120. Again fitted with SD 220 engines, output ranged from 113 to 154 hp (84 to 115 kW).

For 1959, the A-Series was revised, becoming the B series. In addition to a minor exterior facelift, multiple functional upgrades were added to improve the appeal among retail buyers. Power steering and power brakes were introduced; V8 engines were made optional to the powertrain.

The Travelall was offered in the B-100/B-110/B-112 1/2-ton range only in 4x2 form. The B-120 was a 3/4-ton rated model and that was the only Travelall to come in four-wheel drive in this era. A B-122 model featured uprated springs for a higher GVW. The B series trucks carried on into the 1961 model year, when another mild facelift transformed them again into the C series.

== Third generation (1961-1968) ==
Third generation (C/D Series)
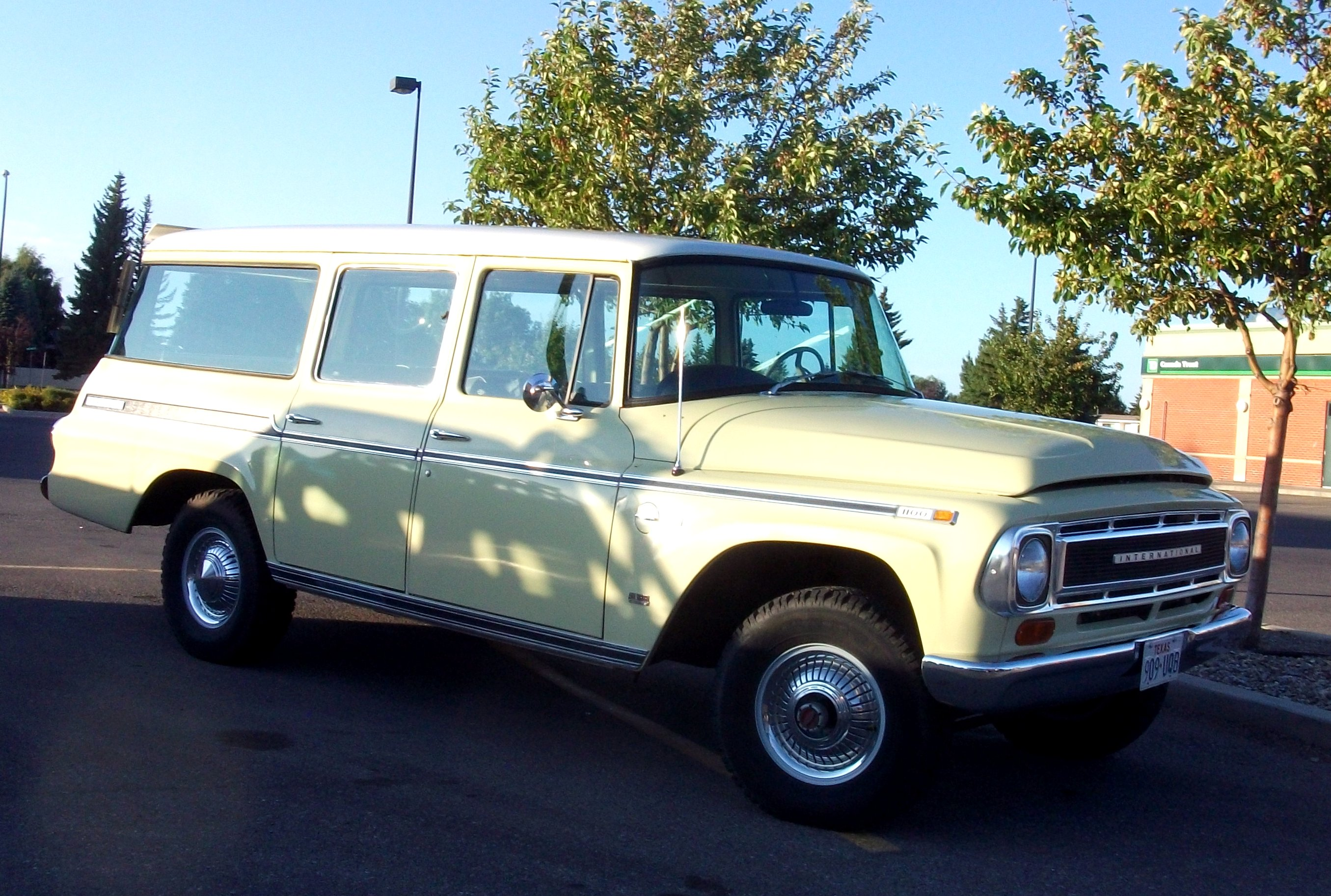
- 1968 1100C Travelall

Overview
- Manufacturer: International Harvester
- Model years: 1961-1968
- Designer: Ted Ornas

Body and chassis
- Class: Full-size SUV
- Body style: 5-door wagon
- Related: International C/D series

Powertrain
- Engine: 240 cu in (3.9 L) BD 240 I6; 241 cu in (3.9 L) BG 241 I6; 264 cu in (4.3 L) BD 264 I6; 266 cu in (4.4 L) V8; 304 cu in (5.0 L) V8; 345 cu in (5.7 L) V8
- Transmission: Borg-Warner T19 4 Speed (2 wheel drive)

Dimensions
- Wheelbase: 119.0 in (3,022.6 mm)

Chronology
- Predecessor: B series Travelall 1959-1960
- Successor: D Series Travelall 1969-1975

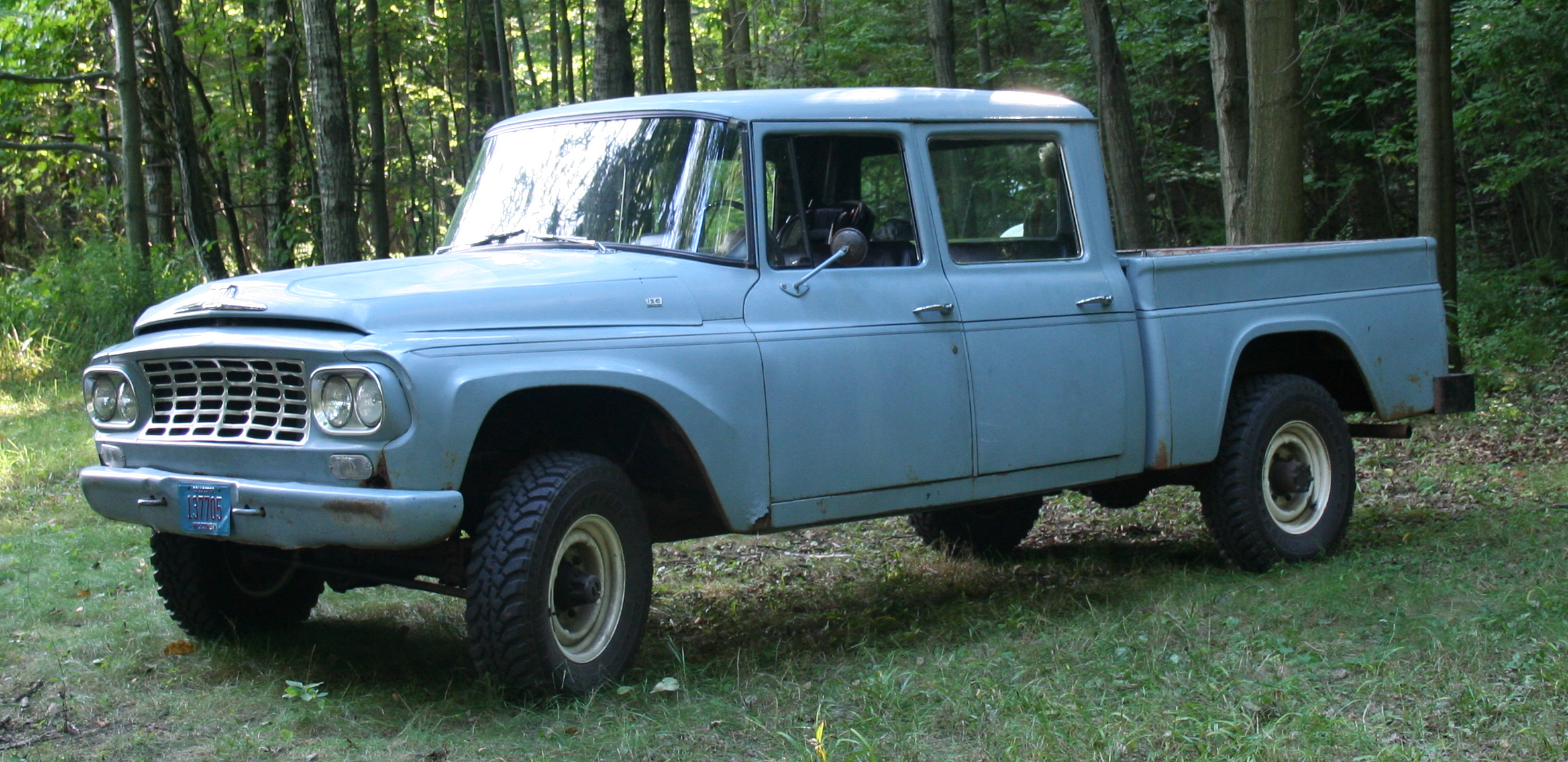
The initial 1961 C-series Travelall had a front and side-by-side twin headlights like this C-120 Travelette

Introduced in April 1961, the C series Travelall marked a redesign of the chassis used by International light-duty trucks. Alongside an all-new frame, the front suspension was redesigned, converting to independent front suspension with front torsion bars. The front axle was moved four inches forward, extending the wheelbase to 119 inches. Coinciding with the all-new chassis and front suspension, the body was mounted lower on the frame; the revised front axle would lead to an increase the front clearance angle.

Outside of its lower mounting, the body itself would carry over much of its design from the previous generation, with major changes limited to a newly concave grille and a move to horizontally mounted quad headlamps. As before, the rear doors were offered either as twin panel doors or as a wagon-style tailgate; the latter was offered with an electrically retractable window.

Throughout the 1960s, development continued in a gradual fashion, with International revising the front fascia on a nearly biannual basis. For 1965, the light trucks adopted the D-Series nomenclature.

== Fourth generation (1969-1975) ==
Fourth generation
- 1971 Travelall 1010 Custom

Overview
- Manufacturer: International Harvester
- Model years: 1969–1975; 1973–1974 (Wagonmaster)
- Assembly: United States: Springfield, Ohio

Body and chassis
- Class: Full-size SUV
- Body style: 5-door wagon 4-door crew cab (Wagonmaster)
- Related: International Travelette

Powertrain
- Engine: 232 cu in (3.8 L) AMC 232 I6; 304 cu in (5.0 L) IH V8; 345 cu in (5.7 L) IH V8; 392 cu in (6.4 L) IH V8; 401 cu in (6.6 L) AMC V-400 V8
- Transmission: 3-speed manual; 4-speed manual; 5-speed manual; 5-speed overdrive manual; 3-speed automatic

Dimensions
- Wheelbase: 119 in (3,023 mm)
- Length: 203.9 in (5,179 mm)
- Width: 77.6 in (1,971 mm)
- Height: 1010: 66.5 in (1,689 mm); 1110: 68.9 in (1,750 mm)
- Curb weight: 1010: 4,251 lb (1,928 kg); 1110: 4,231 lb (1,919 kg)

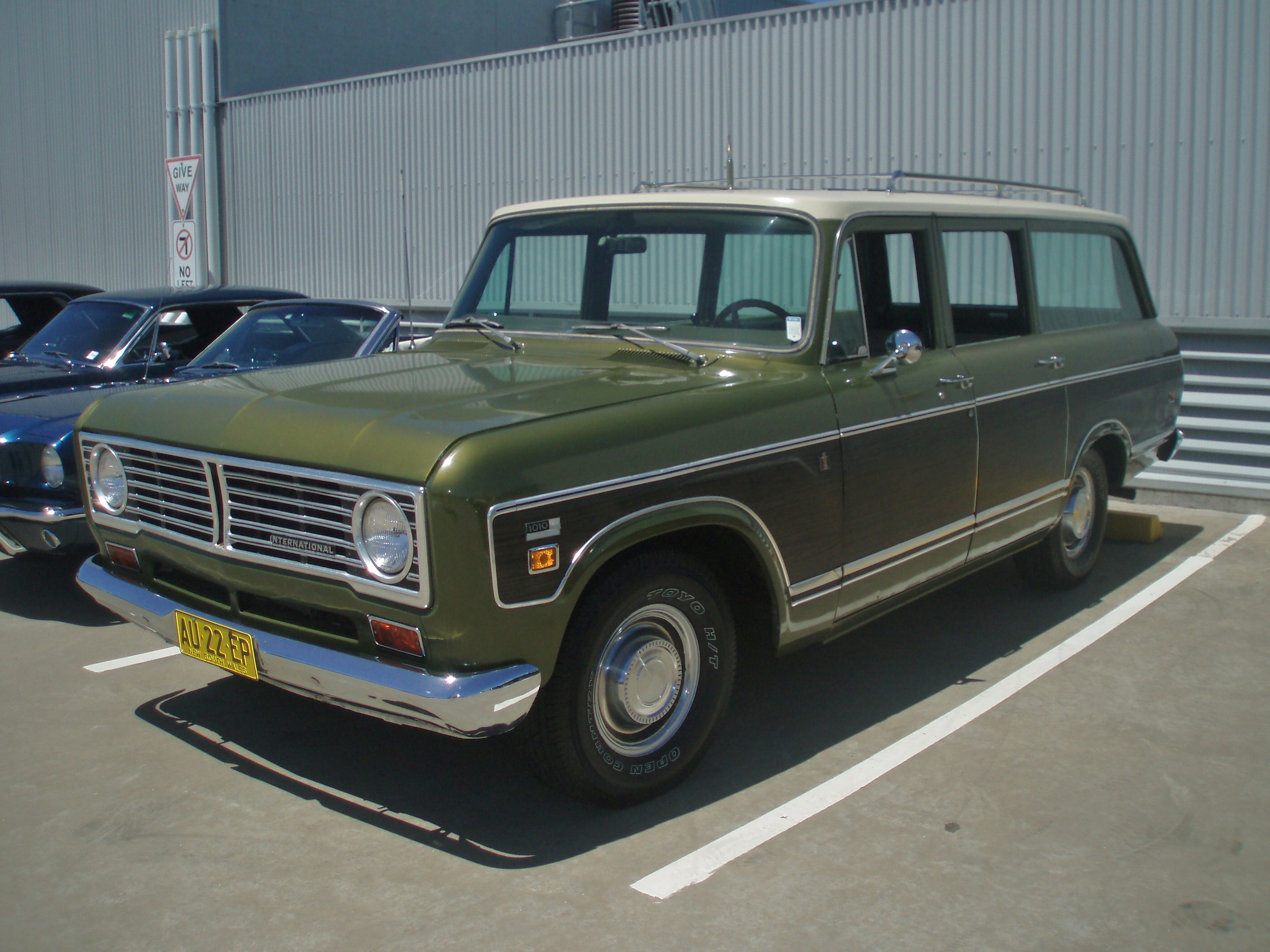
1973 International Travelall

For 1969 production, International released its fourth-generation Travelall. Again a body and mechanical variant of its Light Line pickups, the Travelall had become split into a distinct model line, slotted above the Scout. Sized roughly between the Jeep Wagoneer and the Chevrolet/GMC Suburban, the Travelall was branded as a truck-based station wagon.

For 1969, the Travelall was offered in 1000, 1100, and 1200 payload series in both two-wheel drive and four-wheel drive (the latter, optional on 1100 and 1200 series). While offered in a single trim level, the model line was offered with multiple interior and exterior features; ranging from relatively spartan examples to well-equipped versions sharing features in line with full-size station wagons (including exterior woodgrain trim). In line with the Suburban, the Travelall was also offered with up to three rows of forward-facing passenger seating.

For 1971, the Travelall received an update of the front fascia shared with the Light Line pickups; the model series nomenclature was changed to 1010, 1110, and 1210. For 1972, the grille was revised again.

For 1974, the Travelall underwent a second nomenclature change, offering the 100 and 200 series. The model line adopted the chassis revisions of the pickup trucks, adopting a coil-sprung independent front suspension on 2WD models and front leaf springs on 4WD models (replacing the torsion bars introduced in 1961). For 1975, the 100 became the 150. Despite the larger series number, both front and rear axle weight ratings were slightly reduced.

=== Mechanical details ===
Through its production, the fourth-generation Travelall was equipped with four different engines (shared between the Scout and the Light Line trucks). An AMC-supplied 232 cubic-inch inline-6 was a standard engine for the 1000 from 1969 to 1971; as an option, International offered 304, 345, and 392 cubic-inch V8s. For 1973 and 1974, in response to a short supply of IHC V8 engines, the Travelall was offered with an optional AMC 401 cubic-inch V8 (named the V-400 by IHC). By 1975, following the adoption of net horsepower ratings, outputs were lowered to 141-172hp. Engines were paired with either a manual or an automatic transmission.

In late 1971, International introduced a Bendix-developed anti-lock brake system, named Adaptive Braking System. One of the first vehicles offered with any form of anti-lock brakes, the expensive option was rarely selected by owners.

=== Wagonmaster ===
For 1973 and 1974, International marketed a pickup truck variant of the Travelall. Named the Wagonmaster, the design removed the roof and windows of the cargo section, creating a pickup truck bed. In contrast to the Travelette crew-cab, the Wagonmaster bed was integrated into the body; it was 5 feet in length (reduced from the 6 1/2 feet and 8 feet offered with the Travelette).

While many Light Line pickup trucks were developed for work or farm use, the Wagonmaster was developed for truck users who towed (primarily owners of fifth-wheel RV trailers). However, the vehicle found little demand, as the production vehicle provided unfavorable handling characteristics; the Wagonmaster shared its wheelbase with the Travelall, with the fifth-wheel hitch located behind the rear axle. Coinciding with declining overall demand for the Travelall, the Wagonmaster was discontinued after 1974 production; it is unknown how many were produced (ranging from 500 to under 2000).

Following the Wagonmaster, International introduced a pickup-truck version of the Scout II for 1976 (the Terra); instead of developing it for towing, the Scout II Terra was a half-cab pickup truck (with a lift-off hardtop), serving as one of the first mid-size pickup trucks. Though explicitly not designed for 5th-wheel towing, the Chevrolet Avalanche of the 2000s revisited the concept of the Wagonmaster, adopting the body of the Chevrolet Suburban as a crew-cab pickup truck.

=== Discontinuation ===
During the 1974 model year, sales of the model line began to collapse following the 1973 oil crisis. For 1973, the Chevrolet/GMC Suburban received a fourth passenger door for the first time, placing the widely-available model line in direct competition with the fuel-thirsty Travelall (achieving 10-12mpg on average). Though smaller than the Suburban (but larger in size than the Jeep Wagoneer), the Travelall still retained high owner loyalty and satisfaction.

In May 1975, International Harvester discontinued the entire Light Line model series, which included its single-cab and Travelette pickup trucks, chassis cabs, and Travelall wagons (the Wagonmaster was withdrawn in 1974). Subsequently, the International consumer vehicle line consisted exclusively of the Scout II SUV, which remained in production through 1980.

Since the discontinuation of the Travelall and the Scout, International has concentrated production of road vehicles entirely on medium-duty and heavy-duty trucks; as of current production, the company has not again developed a light truck or SUV for sale in North America.

== Variants ==
Travelalls were also produced with raised roofs and extended wheelbases for applications such as school buses, ambulances and airport limos. Many of these modifications were performed by the Springfield Equipment Company and were marketed by International.
