= International A series =

Range of trucks

The International A series (or A-line) replaced the S series in April 1957. The name stood for "Anniversary", as 1957 marked the fiftieth (or Golden) anniversary of truck production by International Harvester. It was largely a rebodied version of the light and medium S-series truck, incorporating a wide cab and more integrated fenders. The trucks were assembled in Springfield, Ohio at the former Warder, Bushnell & Glessner Co. or Champion Works factory off Lagonda Ave. A modified version of this truck range was also built in Australia until 1979, where it was marketed both as an International and as a Dodge.

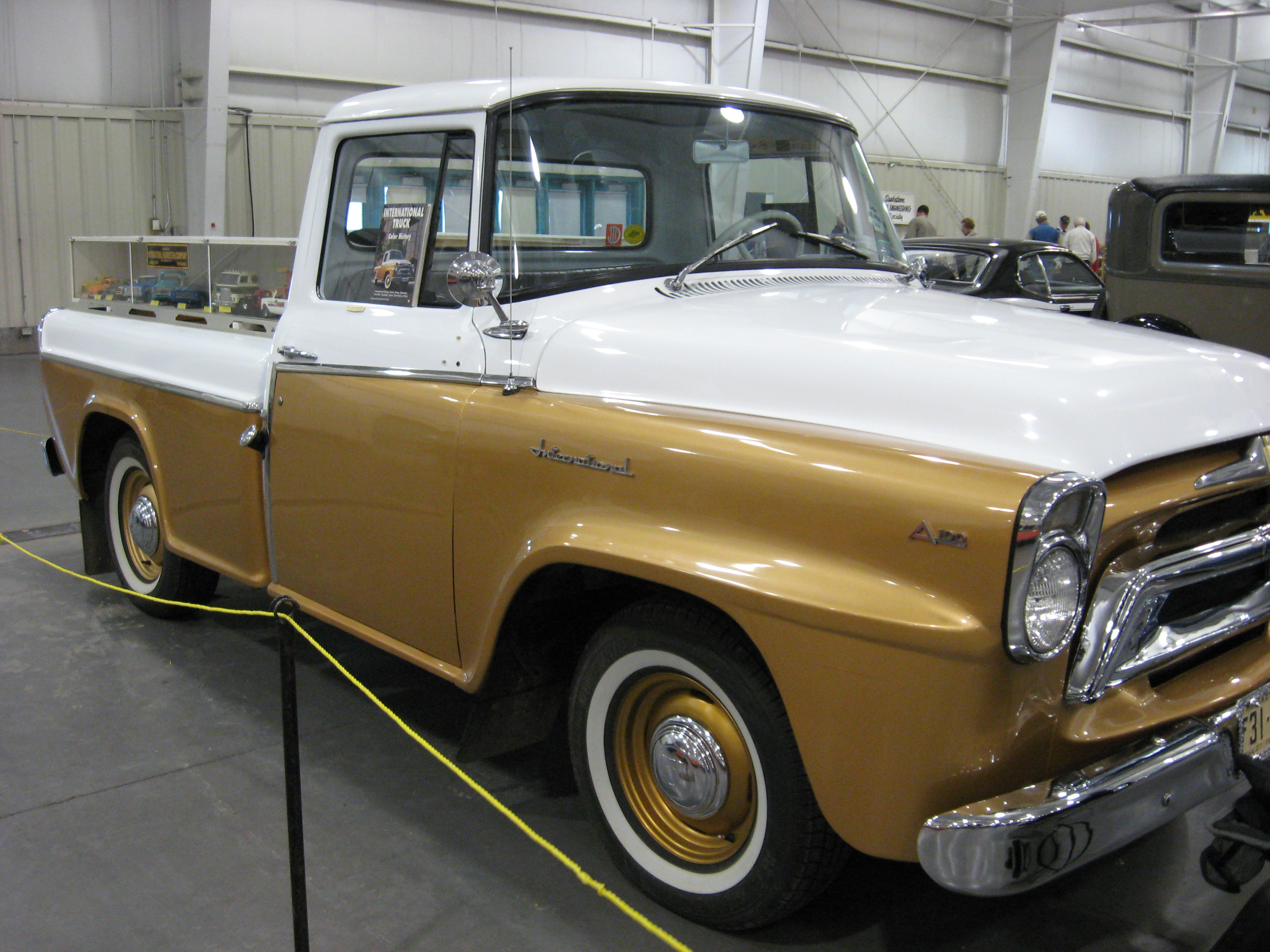
1957 A-100 pickup, Golden Jubilee special package

== Design ==
The new lower design necessitated a slight hump in the cabin floor. The stylish new front end, deleted running boards, and panoramic windshield brought the design more up to date for the later half of the fifties on this, the first all-new design to appear since Ted Ornas was put in charge of design in 1953. The hood was now hinged in the rear, rather than being a lift-off unit. The parking lights were mounted above the headlights. As with the R- and S-series trucks, there was a Travelall station wagon version developed from the new range. There were A-100 to A-180 series models available, with Gross Vehicle Weight ratings ranging from 4,200 to 33,000 lb (1,900 to 15,000 kg). A step-side bed remained standard, but a new flush-sided "Bonus Load" bed was an option for the first time. There was also a gold and white two-tone Golden Jubilee Custom Pickup package available, featuring some special equipment.

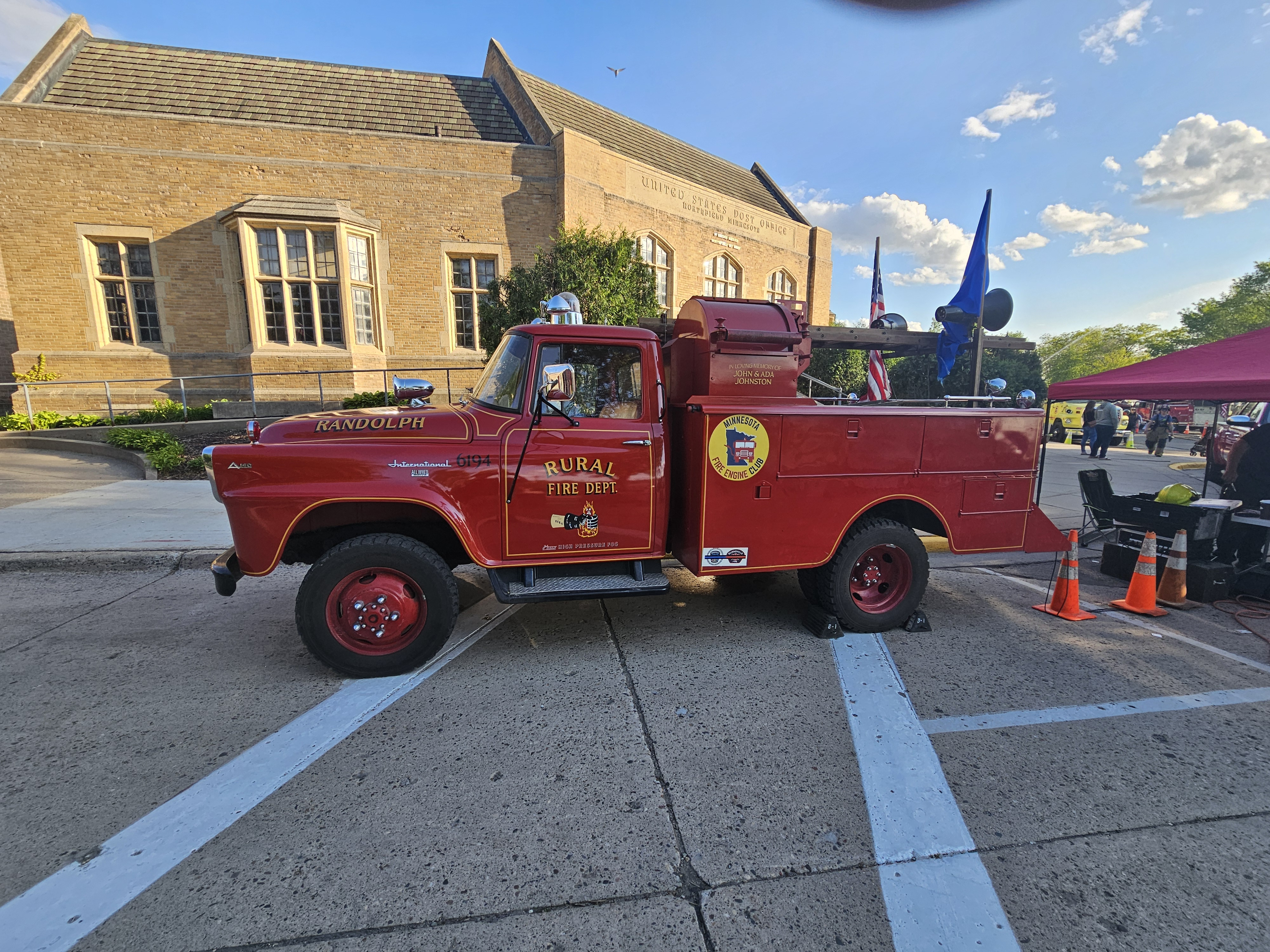
1958 International Harvester A140 Brush Truck

== B series ==
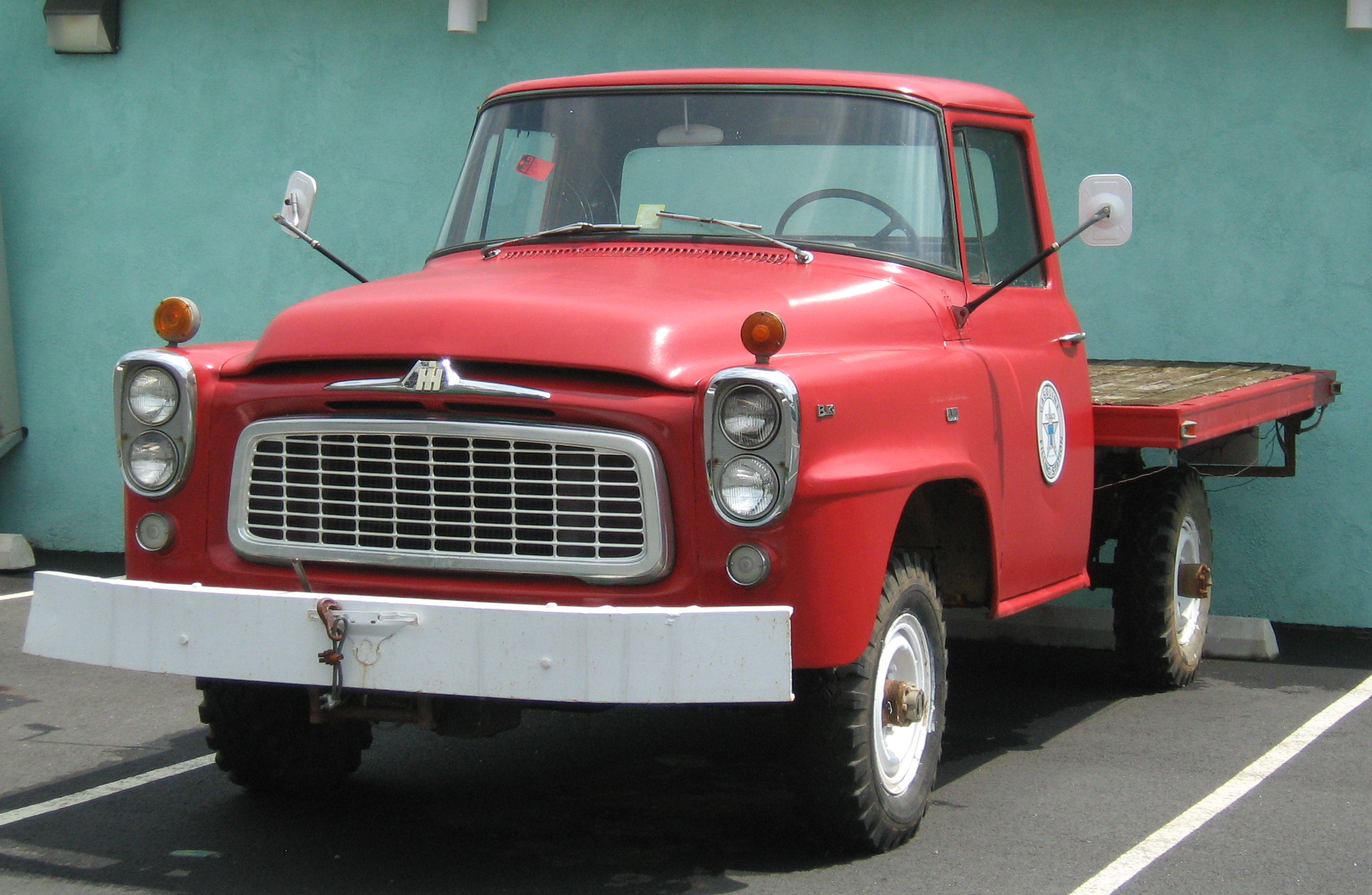
International B-120 4x4 flatbed truck

For 1959, the B series replaced the A series. This was the first of the series to feature V8 engines as an option, of either 304 ci or 345 ci. The usual engines were International's 'Diamond' series of inline-sixes. The B series had twin headlights, mounted above each other. The B-120 was also available with four-wheel drive. The B series was available with the same weight ratings as its predecessor, and was built until 1961 when more thorough changes took place, and the truck became known as the C series.

== Australian production ==
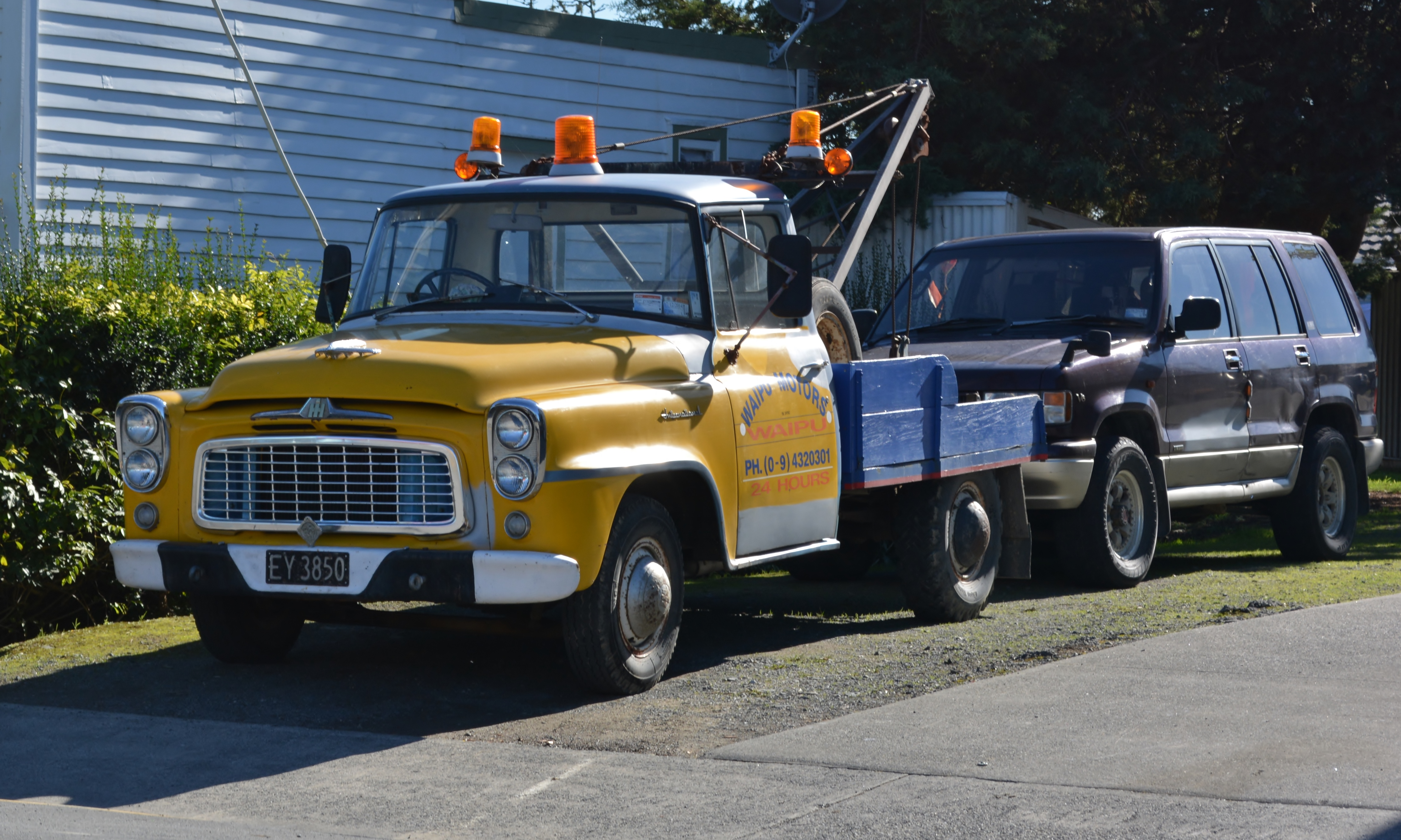
1962 International AA-120 (Australia)

In Australia the A series was built as the AA series from 1958 until 1962. Early models still have the S series grille, albeit with twin headlights. Later on (In late 1959) they received a mesh grille making them look nearly identical to the North American B series, they also received a new style dash at this time. It was the last Australian International Harvester truck to mirror the North American model, as the succeeding AB series of 1961 received many of the C series technical updates but had locally developed bodywork built by Chrysler of Australia. These received a locally built version of IHC's 240, 264, and 282 cubic inch inline-sixes called the "ABD" (for "Australian Blue Diamond"). The Australian-built trucks also have Lucas electrics, as well as some Australian-made Bosch parts.

Between 1963 and 1965 around 700 AB series trucks were manufactured as Off-Highway machines as part of a custom order by the Australian Wheat Board to transport grains within the grounds of their grain silo facilities. Whilst appearing visually similar to the roadgoing variant, these trucks came standard with tipping grain bodies, heavier rear suspension, lower range gearboxes, and excluded much of the roadworthy equipment such as indicators. These trucks were identifiable by a secondary model number commencing with WB representing the wheat board.

The AA received its new grill and a new style dash in late 1959.

== See also ==
- List of International Harvester vehicles
