= List of International Harvester/Navistar engines =

The International Harvester Company (IHC) has been building its own proprietary truck engines since the introduction of their first truck in 1907. International tended to use proprietary diesel engines. In the 1970s, IHC built the DVT 573 V-8 diesel of 240 and 260 hp (179 and 194 kW) but these were not highly regarded and relatively few were sold. Their DT 466 engine started in 1974 and was very successful.

== IHC engines ==
The first IHC "Highwheeler" truck had a very simple air-cooled horizontally opposed two-cylinder engine with a 5-inch (130 mm) stroke and a 5-inch (130 mm) bore, and produced around 18–20 hp (13–15 kW). Displacement was 196 cubic inches (3.2 L). In 1915 a new L-head water-cooled 201 cubic inches (3.3 L) inline-four engine appeared. While International's own engines underwent constant developments, the pace of truck production in the twenties was such that others' engines (from Waukesha, Buda, and Lycoming for instance) had to be installed in some parts of the range.

International Harvester's first in house six-cylinder engines appeared in some of the 1926 S-series trucks, seemingly a response to market pressures rather than to any particular need for such a layout. In 1928, a new heavy range of trucks (the HS-series) built around a series of engines from Hall-Scott appeared. These engines were used by IHC for some heavy-duty applications until 1935, although their own large engines (525 cu in (8.6 L) FBD and 648 cu in (10.6 L) FEB) had appeared in 1932. The medium-duty 1930 A-series trucks received the all-new 278.7 cu in (4.6 L) FB-3 six-cylinder engine, with overhead valves and seven main bearings. This was complemented by larger versions of the same engine and was built until late 1940 (as the FBB), the line-up being expanded downward by the smaller FA-series (later FAB) in 1933.

The HD inline-sixes, later to become the first in International's long running "Diamond" series, first appeared in the C-30 truck of 1934. Available in three different displacements (see table), they were renamed "Green Diamond" in late 1940 for the 1941 model year after a number of detail improvements. This year also brought the new "Blue Diamond" (FAC) and "Red Diamond" (FBC) engines. A post-war version of the 269 cubic inches (4.4 L) Blue Diamond became the "Super Blue Diamond" when installed in the post-war medium L-line trucks. The Blue Diamond engine lived on until the early 60's renamed as Black Diamond engines, the BD-282 and BD-308.

International Harvester gasoline I4 engines
Engine Family	Cylinder Layout	Name	Displacement	Bore × Stroke	Fuel System Type	Years Produced
"Comanche" 4	I4	4-152	151.8 cu in (2.5 L; 2,488 cc)	3 7/8 in (98.4 mm) × 3 7/32 in (81.8 mm)	Carburetor	1961–1972
"Comanche" 4	I4	4-196	195.4 cu in (3.2 L; 3,203 cc)	4 1/8 in (104.8 mm) × 3 21/32 in (92.9 mm)	Carburetor	1966–1980
International Harvester gasoline I6 engines
Engine Family	Cylinder Layout	Name	Displacement	Bore × Stroke	Fuel System Type	Years Produced
HD; Green Diamond	I6	HD/GD 175	174.9 cu in (2.9 L; 2,867 cc)	3 in (76.2 mm) × 4 1/8 in (104.8 mm)	L-head; Carburetor	1934–1949
HD; Green Diamond	I6	HD-3/GD 214	213.3 cu in (3.5 L; 3,495 cc)	3 5/16 in (84.1 mm) × 4 1/8 in (104.8 mm)	L-head; Carburetor	1934–1949
HD; Green Diamond	I6	HD-2/GD 233	232.7 cu in (3.8 L; 3,813 cc)	3 5/16 in (84.1 mm) × 4 1/2 in (114.3 mm)	L-head; Carburetor	1934–1949
FAC; Blue Diamond	I6	FAC-241	241.5 cu in (4.0 L; 3,958 cc)	3 3/8 in (85.7 mm) × 4 1/2 in (114.3 mm)	Carburetor	1941-1954
FAC; Blue Diamond	I6	BLD-250	250.6 cu in (4.1 L; 4,106 cc)	3 7/16 in (87.3 mm) × 4 1/2 in (114.3 mm)	Carburetor	1941-1954
FAC; Blue Diamond	I6	FAC-260	259.8 cu in (4.3 L; 4,257 cc)	3 1/2 in (88.9 mm) × 4 1/2 in (114.3 mm)	Carburetor	1941-1954
FAC; Blue Diamond	I6	BLD-269	269.1 cu in (4.4 litres)		Carburetor	1941-1954
Silver Diamond; Black Diamond/BD; BG	I6	SD-220	220.5 cu in (3.6 L; 3,614 cc)	3 9/16 in (90.5 mm) × 3 11/16 in (93.7 mm)	Carburetor	1949–1969
Silver Diamond; Black Diamond/BD; BG	I6	SD-240/BG-241	240.3 cu in (3.9 L; 3,938 cc)	3 9/16 in (90.5 mm) × 4.018 in (102.1 mm)	Carburetor	1949–1969
Silver Diamond; Black Diamond/BD; BG	I6	BD-264/BG-265	264.3 cu in (4.3 L; 4,331 cc)	3 11/16 in (93.7 mm) × 4 1/8 in (104.8 mm)	Carburetor	1949–1969
Silver Diamond; Black Diamond/BD; BG	I6	BD-282 (Note: Originally a Blue Diamond engine, renamed Black Diamond)	282.5 cu in (4.6 L; 4,630 cc)	3 13/16 in (96.8 mm) × 4 1/8 in (104.8 mm)	Carburetor	1949–1969
Silver Diamond; Black Diamond/BD; BG	I6	BD-308	308 cu in (5.0 litres)		Carburetor	1949–1969
FBC; Red Diamond	I6	FBC/RED 318	318.4 cu in (5.2 L; 5,218 cc)	3 7/8 in (98.4 mm) × 4 1/2 in (114.3 mm)	Governed Carburetor	1941–1974
FBC; Red Diamond	I6	FBC/RED 361	360.8 cu in (5.9 L; 5,913 cc)	4 1/8 in (104.8 mm) × 4 1/2 in (114.3 mm)	Governed Carburetor	1941–1974
FBC; Red Diamond	I6	RD 372	372.1 cu in (6.1 L; 6,097 cc)	4 3/8 in (111.1 mm) × 4 1/8 in (104.8 mm)	Governed Carburetor	1941–1974
FBC; Red Diamond	I6	FBC/RED 401	400.9 cu in (6.6 L; 6,570 cc)	4 1/8 in (104.8 mm) × 5 in (127.0 mm)	Governed Carburetor	1941–1974
FBC; Red Diamond	I6	RD 406	405.9 cu in (6.7 L; 6,651 cc)	4 3/8 in (111.1 mm) × 4 1/2 in (114.3 mm)	Governed Carburetor	1941–1974
FBC; Red Diamond	I6	RED 450 then RD 450	451.0 cu in (7.4 L; 7,390 cc)	4 3/8 in (111.1 mm) × 5 in (127.0 mm)	Governed Carburetor	1941–1974
FBC; Red Diamond	I6	RD 501	501.0 cu in (8.2 L; 8,210 cc)	4 1/2 in (114.3 mm) × 5 1/4 in (133.4 mm)	Governed Carburetor	1941–1974
International Harvester gasoline V8 engines
Engine Family	Cylinder Layout	Name	Displacement	Bore × Stroke	Fuel System Type	Years Produced
V/LV	V8	LV-401	400.9 cu in (6.6 L; 6,570 cc)	4 1/8 in (104.8 mm) × 3 3/4 in (95.3 mm)	Governed Carburetor	1955–1974
V/LV	V8	LV-461	461.1 cu in (7.6 L; 7,555 cc)	4 1/8 in (104.8 mm) × 4 5/16 in (109.5 mm)	Governed Carburetor	1955–1974
V/LV	V8	LV-478	477.1 cu in (7.8 L; 7,819 cc)	4 1/2 in (114.3 mm) × 3 3/4 in (95.3 mm)	Governed Carburetor	1955–1974
V/LV	V8	LV-549	548.7 cu in (9.0 L; 8,992 cc)	4 1/2 in (114.3 mm) × 4 5/16 in (109.5 mm)	Governed Carburetor	1955–1974
V/LV	V8	V-537 (Note: Re-engineered engine used in early 70's; never made it into trucks because of the gas crisis of 1973. It was sold for industrial purposes as the V-605 (bore 4.625", stroke 4.500").)	537.6 cu in (8.8 L; 8,810 cc)	4 5/8 in (117.5 mm) × 4 in (101.6 mm)	Governed Carburetor	1955–1974
SV "Comanche"	V8	SV-266	265.8 cu in (4.4 L; 4,355 cc)	3 5/8 in (92.1 mm) × 3 7/32 in (81.8 mm)	Carburetor	1959-1985
SV "Comanche"	V8	SV-304	303.7 cu in (5.0 L; 4,976 cc)	3 7/8 in (98.4 mm) × 3 7/32 in (81.8 mm)	Carburetor	1959-1985
SV "Comanche"	V8	SV-345	345.0 cu in (5.7 L; 5,653 cc)	3 7/8 in (98.4 mm) × 3 21/32 in (92.9 mm)	Carburetor	1959-1985
SV "Comanche"	V8	SV-392	390.9 cu in (6.4 L; 6,406 cc)	4 1/8 in (104.8 mm) × 3 21/32 in (92.9 mm)	Carburetor	1959-1985
MV	V8	MV-404	404 cu in (6.6 litres)		Carburetor	1974-198?
MV	V8	MV-446	446 cu in (7.3 litres)		Carburetor	1974-198?

== International Harvester/Navistar engines ==
International Harvester/Navistar V6/V8 Engine Family
Engine Family	Cylinder Layout	Displacement(s)	Injection Type	Years Produced
DV	V8	DV 462 - 7.6 L (460 cu in); DV 550 - 9 L (550 cu in); DV 550B - 9 L (550 cu in)	Direct injection	DV 462 - 1966-1988; DV 550 - 1966-1988; DV 550B - 1966-1988
D-Series: D 150; D 170; D 190	V8	9 L (550 cu in)	Direct Injection	1962-early 1988
9.0L V8	V8	9 L (550 cu in)	Direct Injection	1966-1988
IDI (International/Ford)	V8	420 cubic inches (6.9 L); 444 cubic inches (7.3 L)	Indirect injection	1983-1987 (6.9L); 1988-1994 (7.3L)
T444E; Original Ford PowerStroke	V8	444 cubic inches (7.3 L)	Direct injection	1994-2004
VT; 2nd-generation Ford PowerStroke	VT275-V6; VT365-V8	275 cubic inches (4.5 L); 365 cubic inches (6.0 L)	Direct injection	2003-2010

== Navistar DT engines ==
Navistar DT Engine Family
Engine Family	Cylinder Layout	Displacement(s)	Injection Type	Years Produced
PLN (Pump Line and Nozzle): DT 360; DT 466	Inline-6	DT 360 - 360 cubic inches (5.9 L); DT 466 - 466 cubic inches (7.6 L)	Direct Injection	1984-late 1995
NGD (New Generation Diesel): DT408; DT466/HT466; DT530/HT530	Inline-6	DT 408 - 408 cubic inches (6.7 L); DT 466/HT466 - 466 cubic inches (7.6 L); DT 530/HT530 - 530 cubic inches (8.7 L)	Direct Injection	1993-1997
HEUI (Hydraulically actuated Electronically controlled Unit Injection): DT466/HT466; DT530/HT530	Inline-6	DT 466/HT466 - 466 cubic inches (7.6 L); DT 530/HT530 - 530 cubic inches (8.7 L)	Direct Injection	1993-2008
G2 (Electro-Hydraulic Generation Two): DT 466/HT466; DT 570/HT570	Inline-6	DT 466/HT466 - 466 cubic inches (7.6 L); DT 570/HT570 - 570 cubic inches (9.3 L)	Direct Injection	2004-2007

== MaxxForce engines ==
Navistar International MaxxForce Engine Family
Engine Family	Cylinder Layout	Displacement(s)	Injection Type	Years Produced
MaxxForce 5	V6	275 cubic inches (4.5 L)	Direct Injection	2007-2010
MaxxForce 7; 3rd Generation Ford PowerStroke	V8	6.4L	Direct Injection	2007-2014 (International); 2008-2010 (Ford)
MaxxForce DT	Inline-6	466 cubic inches (7.6 L)	Direct Injection	2007-2014
MaxxForce 9	Inline-6	570 cubic inches (9.3 L)	Direct Injection	2007-2014
MaxxForce 10	Inline-6	570 cubic inches (9.3 L)	Direct Injection	2007-2014
MaxxForce 11	Inline-6	10.5 L	Direct Injection	2007-2014
MaxxForce 13	Inline-6	12.4 L	Direct Injection	2007-2014

== MWM-International engines ==
In 2005, Navistar acquired MWM International Motores, a Brazilian diesel engine manufacturer formerly associated with the German manufacturer of the same name, Motoren Werke Mannheim AG (MWM). Now called "MWM International Ind. de Motores da America do Sul Ltda.", it has two manufacturing plants: one in São Paulo, Brazil and another in Cordoba, Argentina. Since it was bought by the American group, in addition to the engines manufactured using its own technology and know-how, it has produced two models denominated "NGD", New Generation Diesel, under the brand of "MWM-International". One being a 4-cylinder 3.0 L turbo diesel, featuring piezoelectric common rail direct injection. This engine equipped the South American version of the Ford Ranger and the Troller T4, a Brazil exclusive four wheel drive vehicle. A 6-cylinder 9.3 L turbo diesel was also produced, but mainly dedicated to stationary power applications and the medium-sized trucks, the Volkswagen Constellation Series.

MWM-International NGD Engine Family
Engine Family	Cylinder Layout	Displacement(s)	Power output	Torque	Injection Type	Years Produced
NGD MaxxForce 3.0 HS	Inline-4	184 cubic inches (3.0 L)	163 hp (122 kW) @ 3800 rpm	286 lb⋅ft (388 N⋅m) @1600-2200 rpm	Direct Injection	2005-2012
NGD MaxxForce 10 P	Inline-6	570 cubic inches (9.3 L)	367 hp (273 kW) @2000 rpm	1180 lb⋅ft (1600 N⋅m) @1100-1400 rpm	Direct Injection	2007-2013
MaxxForce MWM 4.8H	Inline-4	292 cubic inches (4.8 L)	185 hp (137 kW) @ 2200 rpm	506 lb⋅ft (687 N⋅m) @1400-1600 rpm	Common Rail	2007-Present
MaxxForce MWM 7.2H	Inline-6	440 cubic inches (7.2 L)	225 hp (168 kW) @ 2200 rpm	850 lb⋅ft (1150 N⋅m) @1400-1600 rpm	Common Rail	2007-Present
