= Mack Trucks =

American truck manufacturing company

Mack Trucks, Inc.

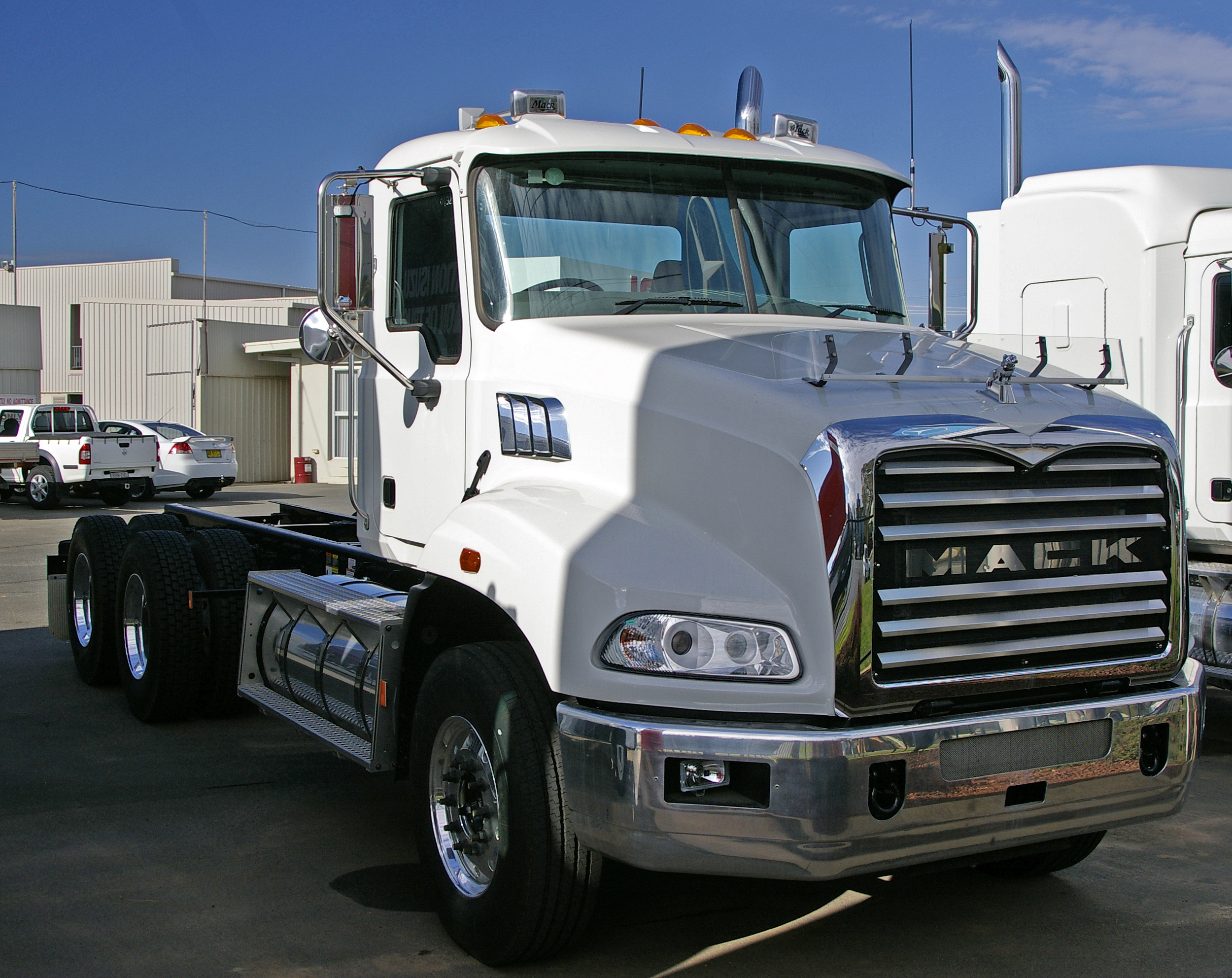
- Type: Subsidiary
- Industry: Automotive
- Founded: July 26, 1900; 126 years ago in Brooklyn, New York (as Mack Brothers Company)
- Founders: John Mack; Augustus Mack
- Headquarters: Allentown, Pennsylvania (1905–2009), Greensboro, North Carolina, U.S. (2009–present)
- Key people: Stephen Roy (President)
- Products: Heavy and medium-duty trucks
- Number of employees: 2000
- Parent: Volvo
- Website: macktrucks.com

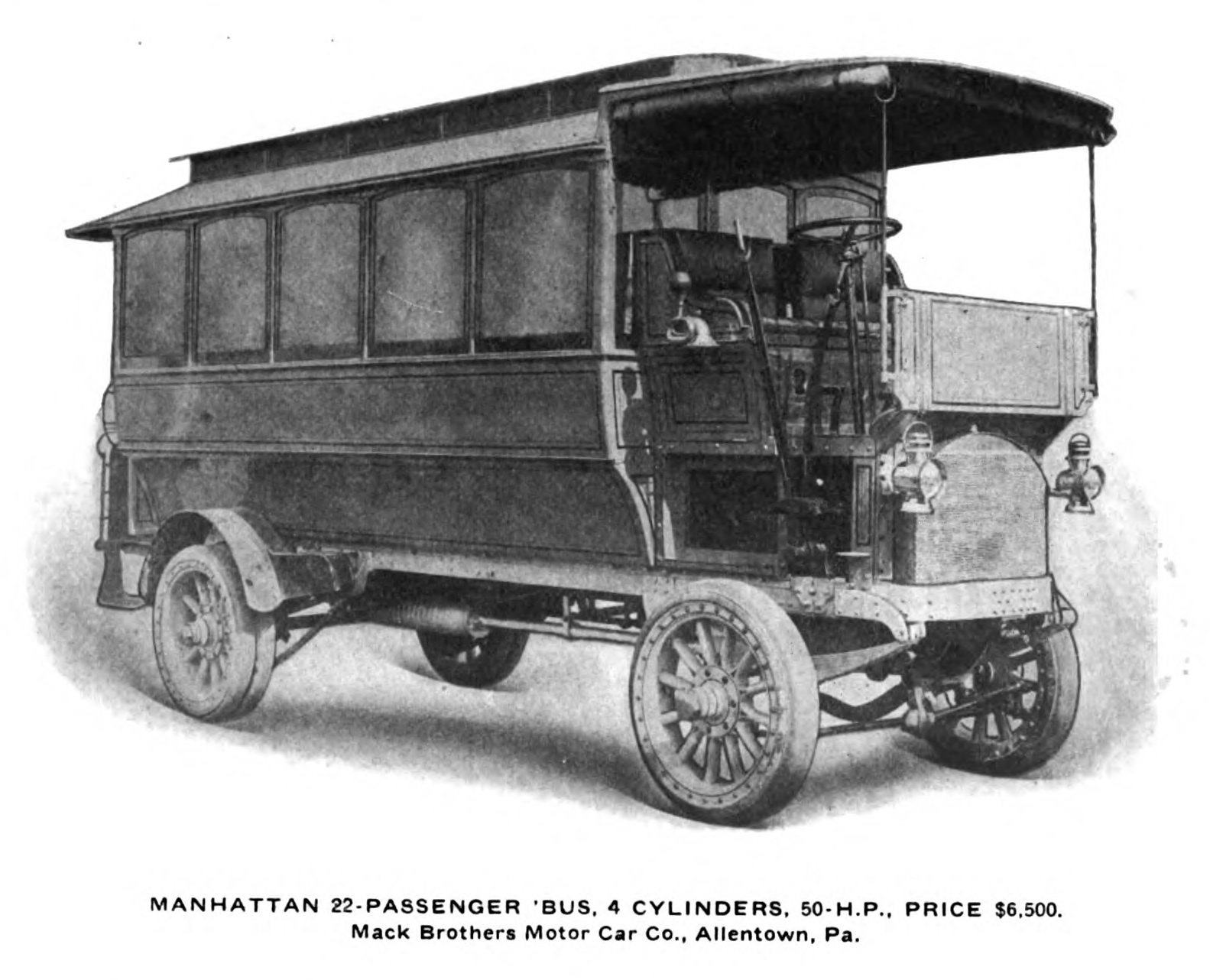
Mack Bus Manhattan in 1908

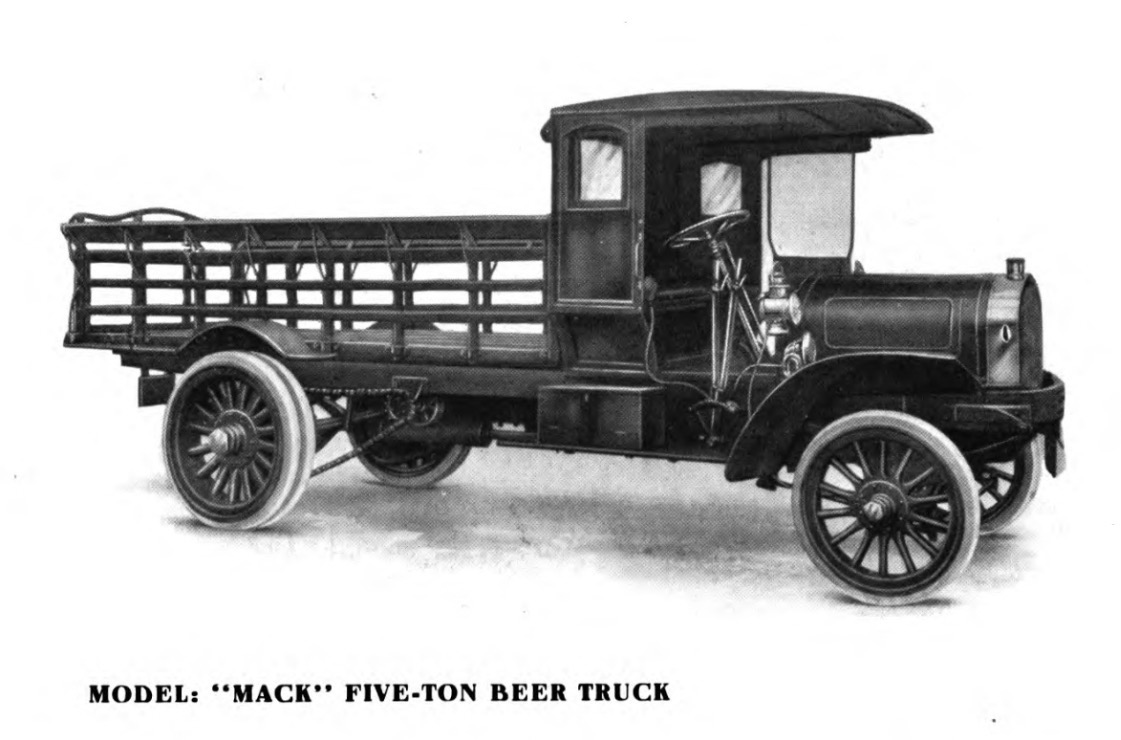
Mack 5 t (1905-1915)

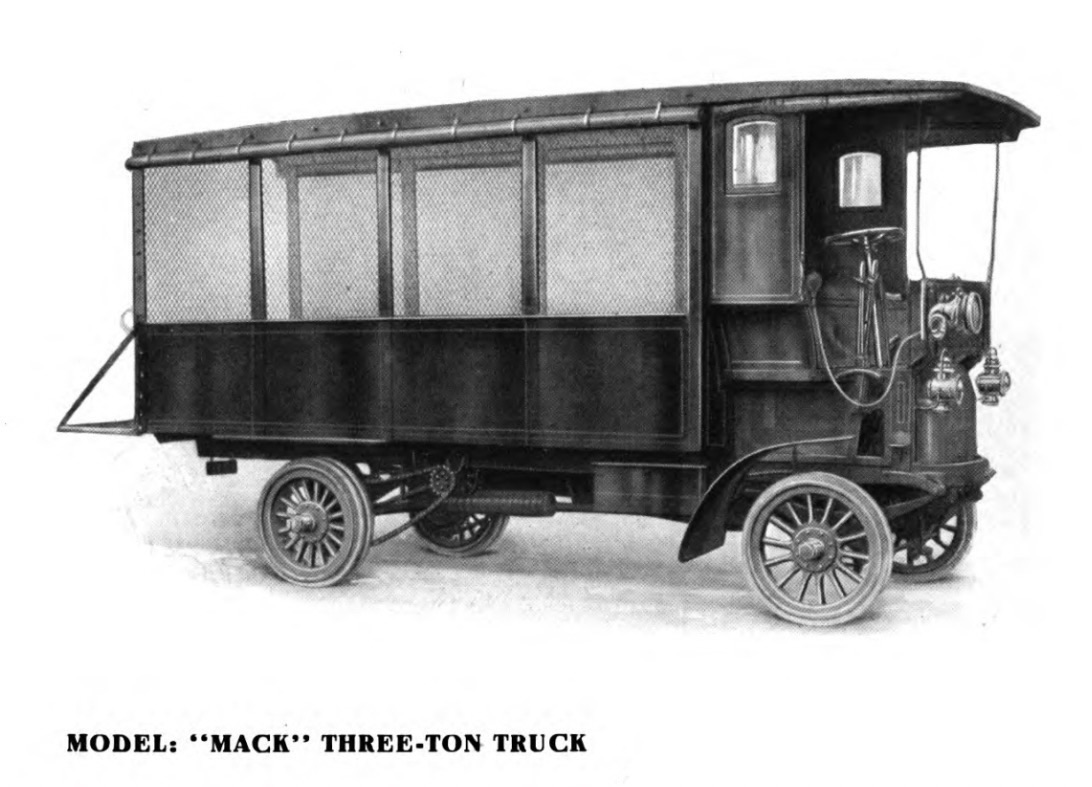
Mack 3 t (1906-1916)

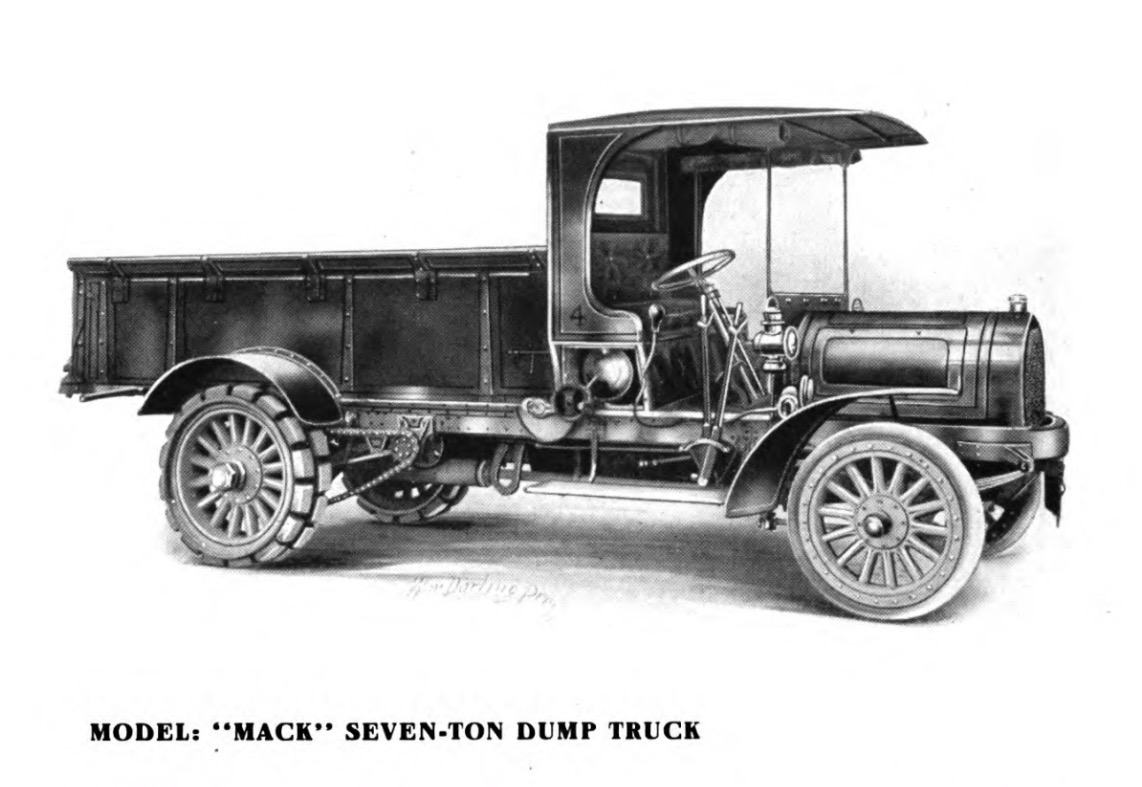
Mack 7 t (1909-1916)

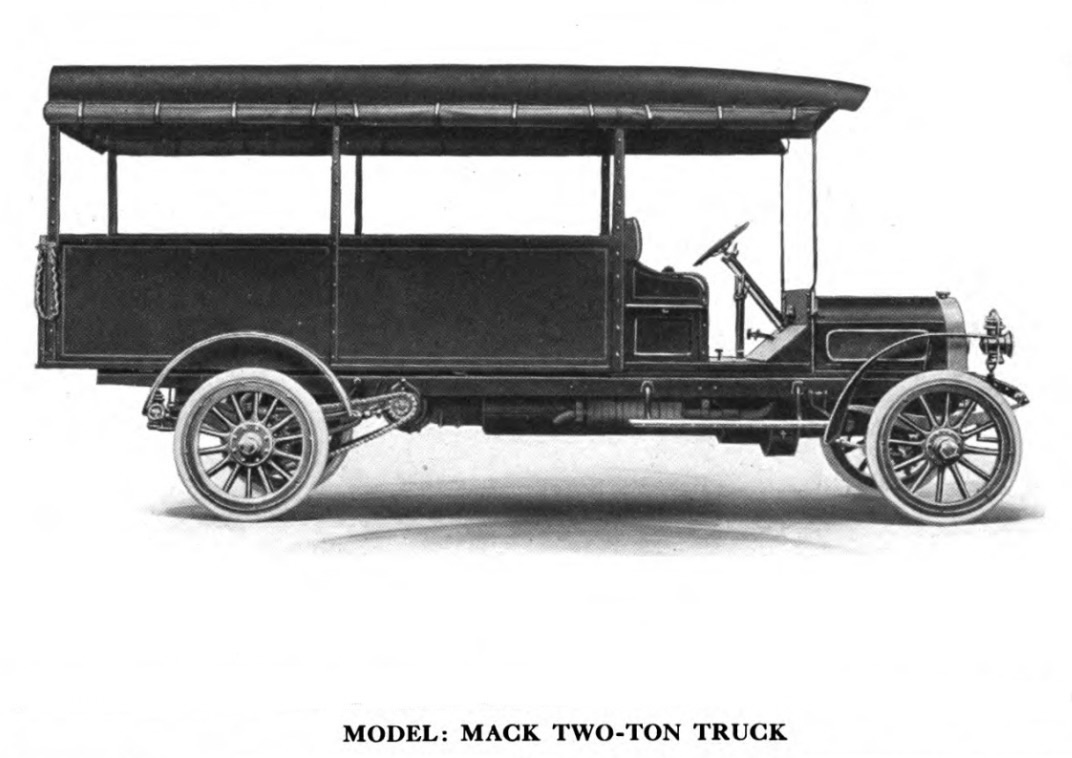
Mack 2t (1908-1916)

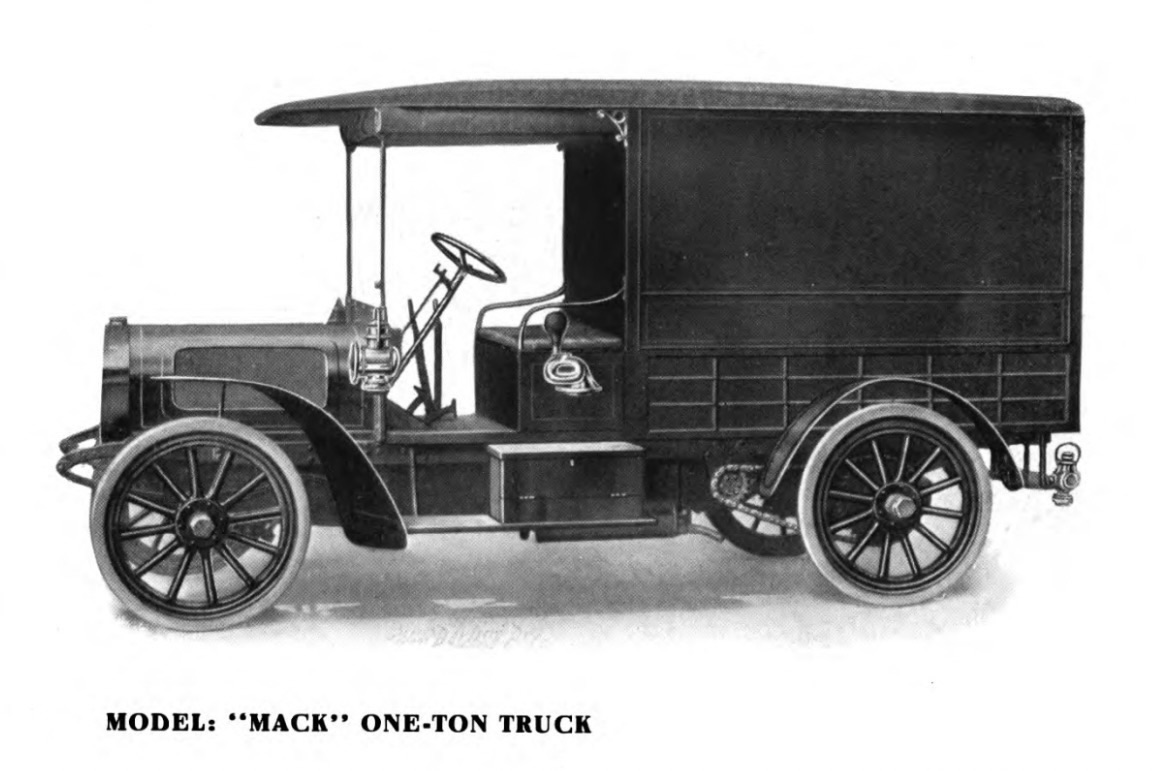
Mack 1 t (1909-1915)

Mack Trucks, Inc. is an American truck manufacturing company and a former manufacturer of buses and trolley buses. Founded in 1900 as the Mack Brothers Company, it manufactured its first truck in 1905 and adopted its present name in 1922. Since 2000, Mack Trucks has been a subsidiary of Volvo, which purchased Mack and its former parent company Renault Véhicules Industriels.

Founded in Brooklyn in 1900, the company moved its headquarters to Allentown, Pennsylvania, five years later, in 1905, remaining in the town for over a century, moving again in 2009.

Mack vehicles are produced in Lower Macungie, Pennsylvania, and Salem, Virginia. Its powertrain products are produced in its Hagerstown, Maryland, plant. Mack also maintains additional assembly plants in facilities in Pennsylvania, Australia, and Venezuela. The company also once maintained plants in Winnsboro, South Carolina, Hayward, California, and Oakville, Ontario, which are now closed.

== Operations ==
The company's manufacturing facilities are located at their Lehigh Valley Operations facility and division, formally known as the Macungie Assembly Operations Plant, in Macungie, Pennsylvania in the Lehigh Valley region of the state. Mack Trucks is the fourth-largest employer in the Lehigh Valley region as of 2024.

The Mack headquarters, known as the Mack Trucks' World Headquarters, is located in Greensboro, North Carolina, where it has resided since 2009.

Mack Trucks is one of the top producers in the vocational and on-road vehicle market, class 8 through class 13. Mack trucks have been sold in 45 countries. Located near its former Allentown corporate headquarters in Macungie, Pennsylvania, the company's manufacturing plant produces all Mack chassis and bodies.

Mack transmissions, TC-15 transfer cases, and rear engine power take-offs are designed and manufactured in Hagerstown, Maryland, which was the original factory location. This plant also produces and designs all Mack engines, including the Mack Defense engines used in tanks and other military applications.

Parts for Mack's right-hand-drive vehicles are produced in Brisbane, Australia for worldwide distribution. Assembly for South America is performed in Macungie alongside the North American trucks. Mack no longer operates Mack de Venezuela C.A., in Caracas, Venezuela. The former Venezuela operation is a complete knock down (CKD) facility. Components were shipped from the United States to Caracas for final assembly.

In addition to its Macungie manufacturing facility, Mack also has a remanufacturing center in Middletown, Pennsylvania.

=== 2008 restructuring plan ===
On August 14, 2008, Mack Trucks announced a major restructuring plan that included:

- Relocation of Mack's head office, product development, most support functions, and purchasing functions to Greensboro, North Carolina, in 2009. Mack's parent, Volvo Trucks, already has its North American base in Greensboro.
- Assembly of all produced Mack highway vehicles in Macungie, Pennsylvania, starting 2008
- Mack's testing facility in Allentown, Pennsylvania being converted into a "customer demonstration and reception center" in 2010
- Restructuring the parts distribution network by 2010 (later delayed to first quarter 2011)

== History ==
=== Corporation timeline ===
This is a timeline of Mack Trucks history.

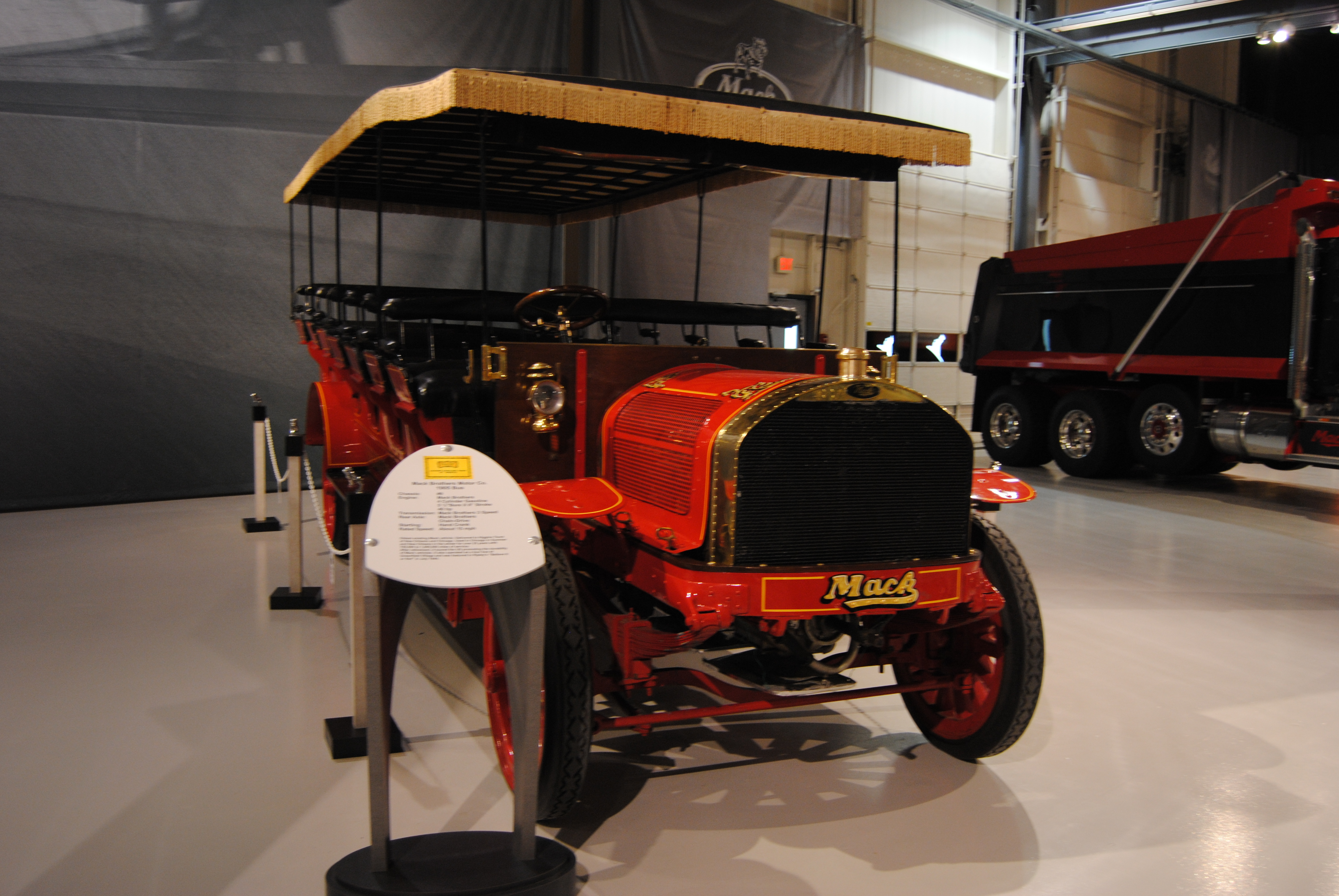
An early bus manufactured by Mack Trucks

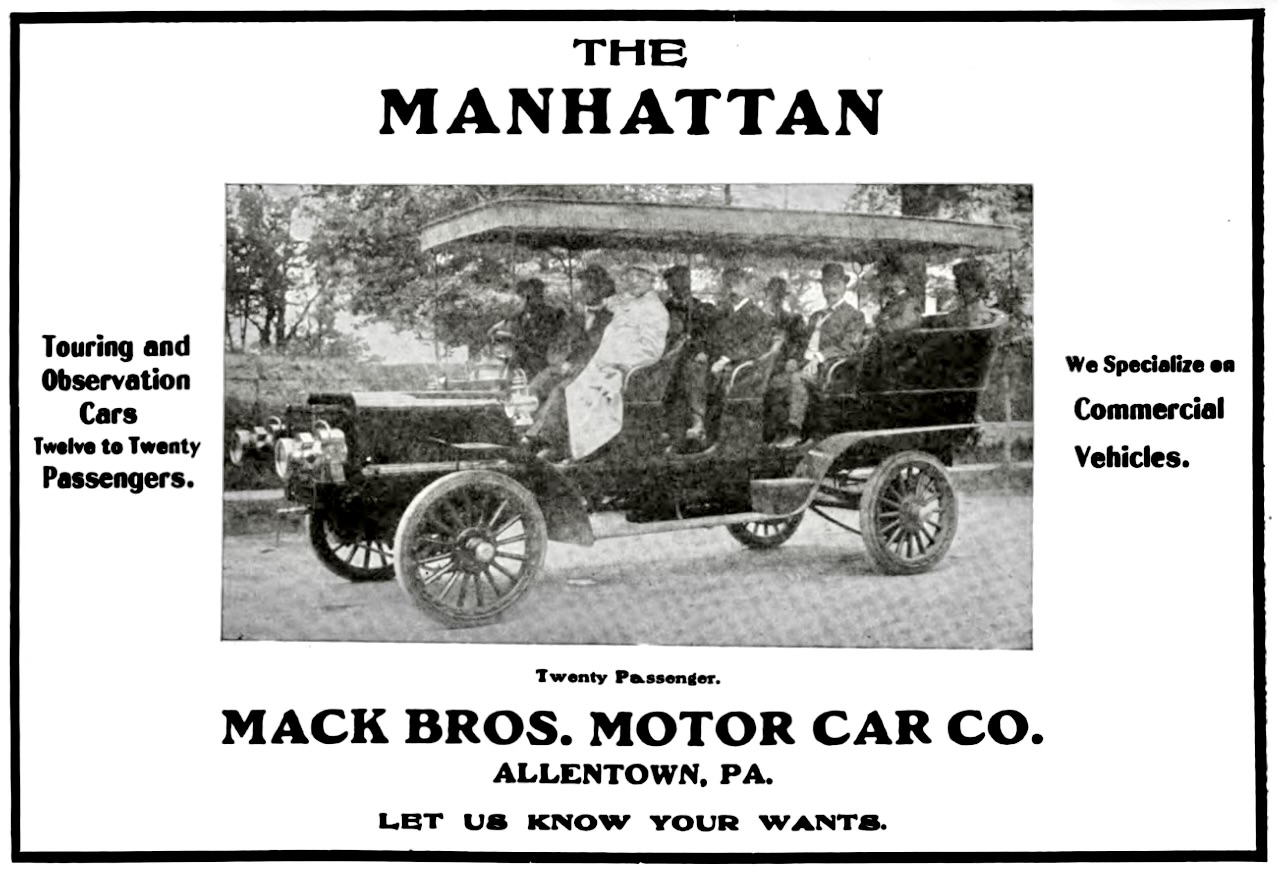
Mack Manhattan advertisement (1905)

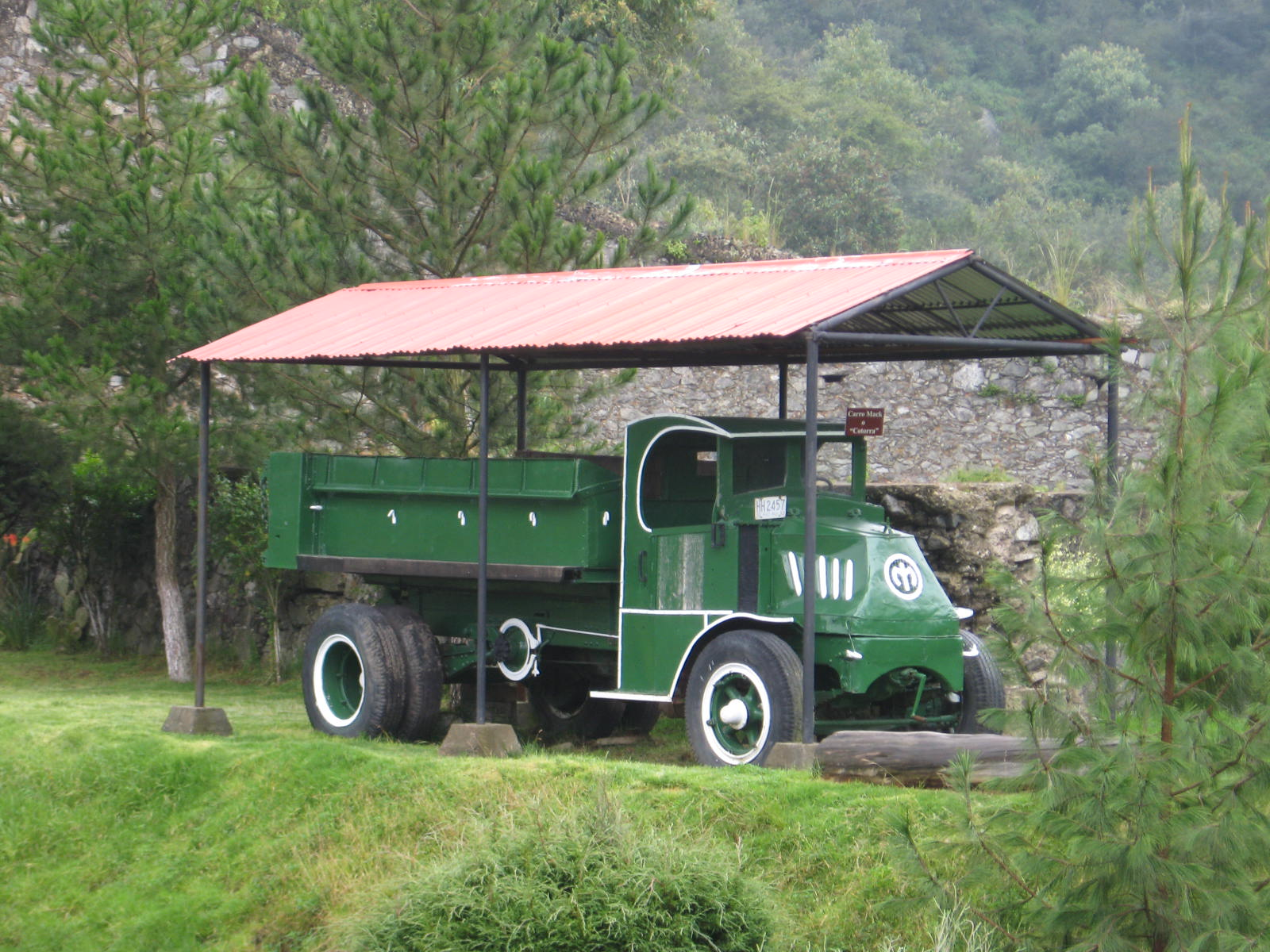
A Mack truck used to carry ore at the Acosta Mine Museum in Real del Monte, Hidalgo, Mexico

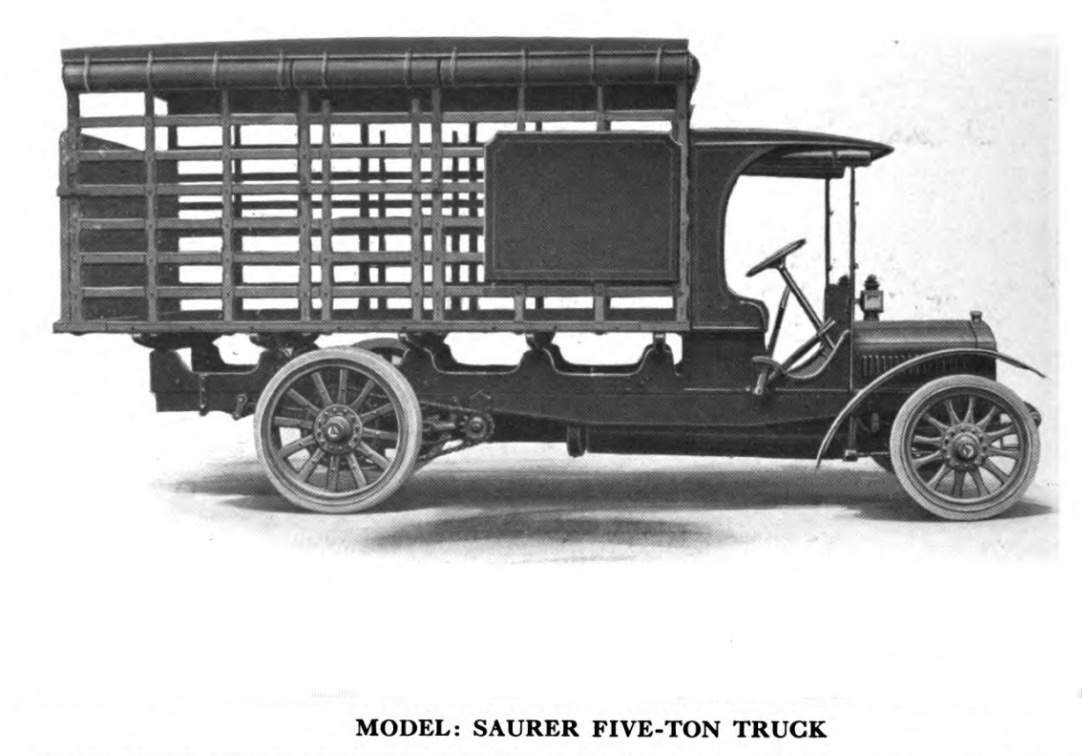
Saurer Motor Truck Company 5 t (1912-1917)

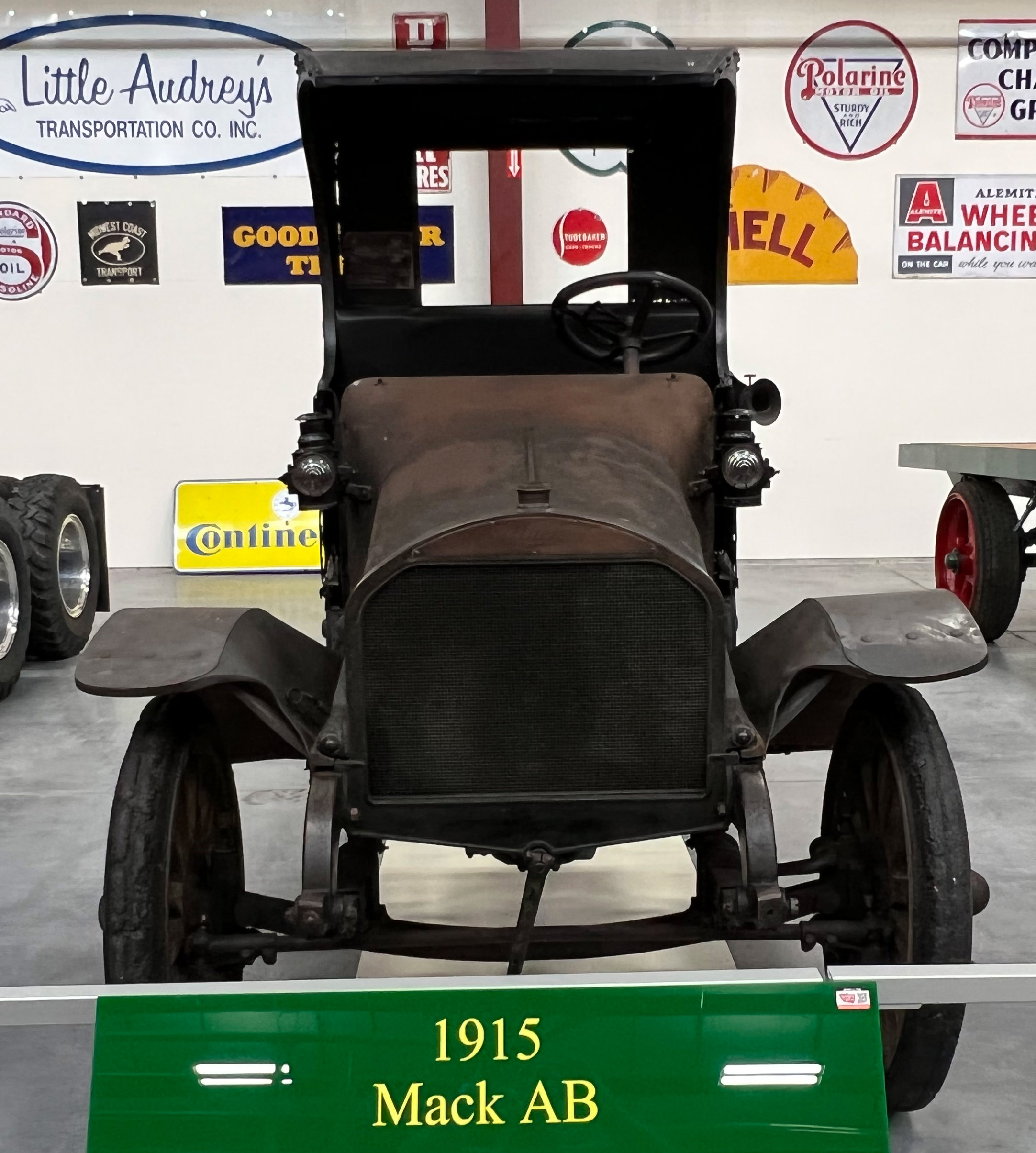
1915 Mack AB truck on display at the Iowa 80 Trucking Museum, Walcott, Iowa.

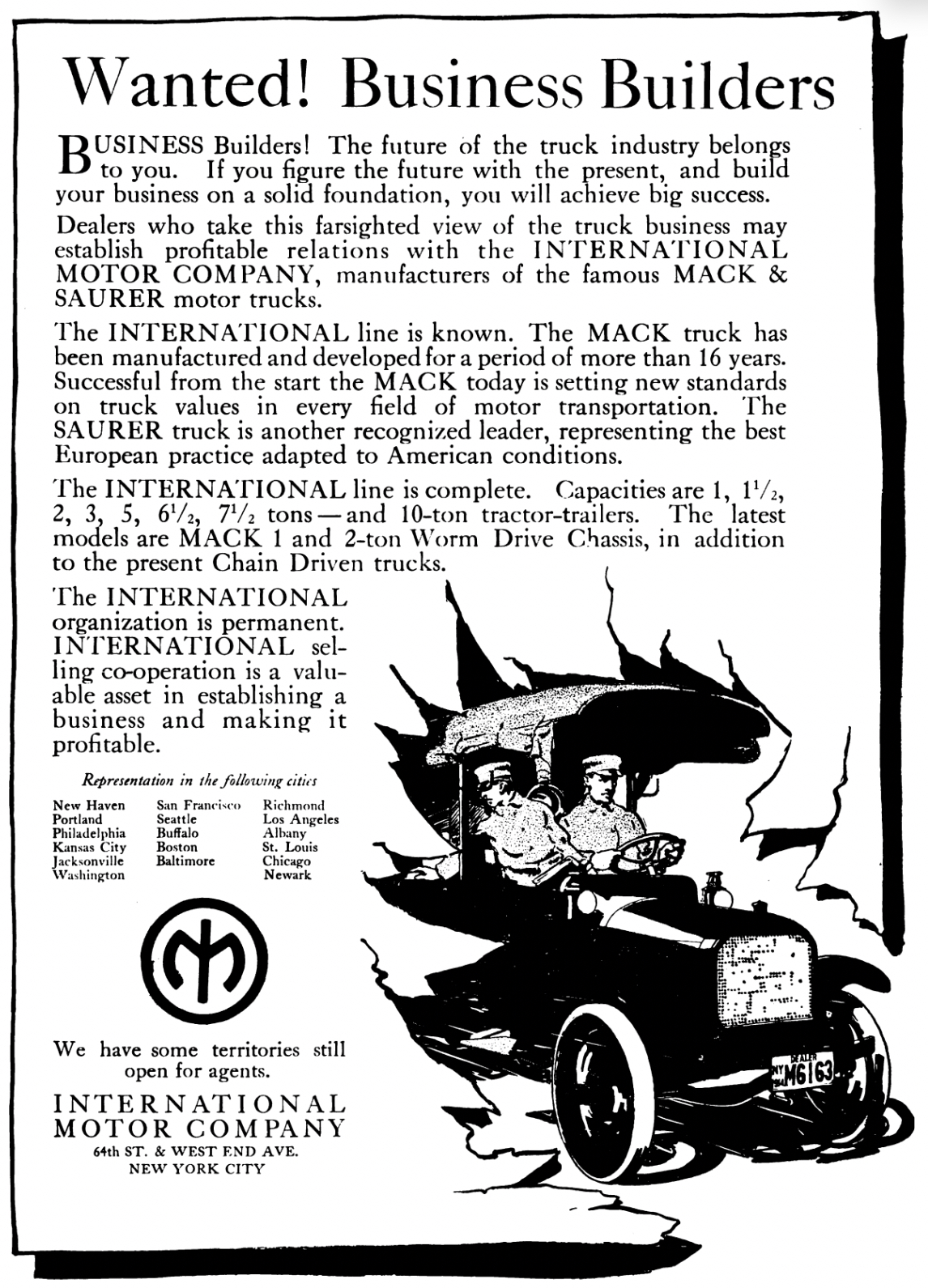
International Motor Truck Company (IMTC) (1915)

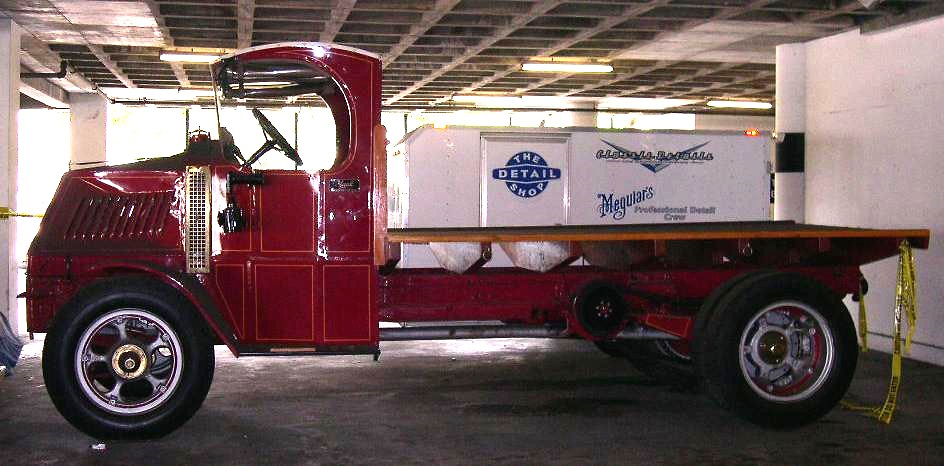
Mack AC-model flatbed delivery truck at the Petersen Automotive Museum

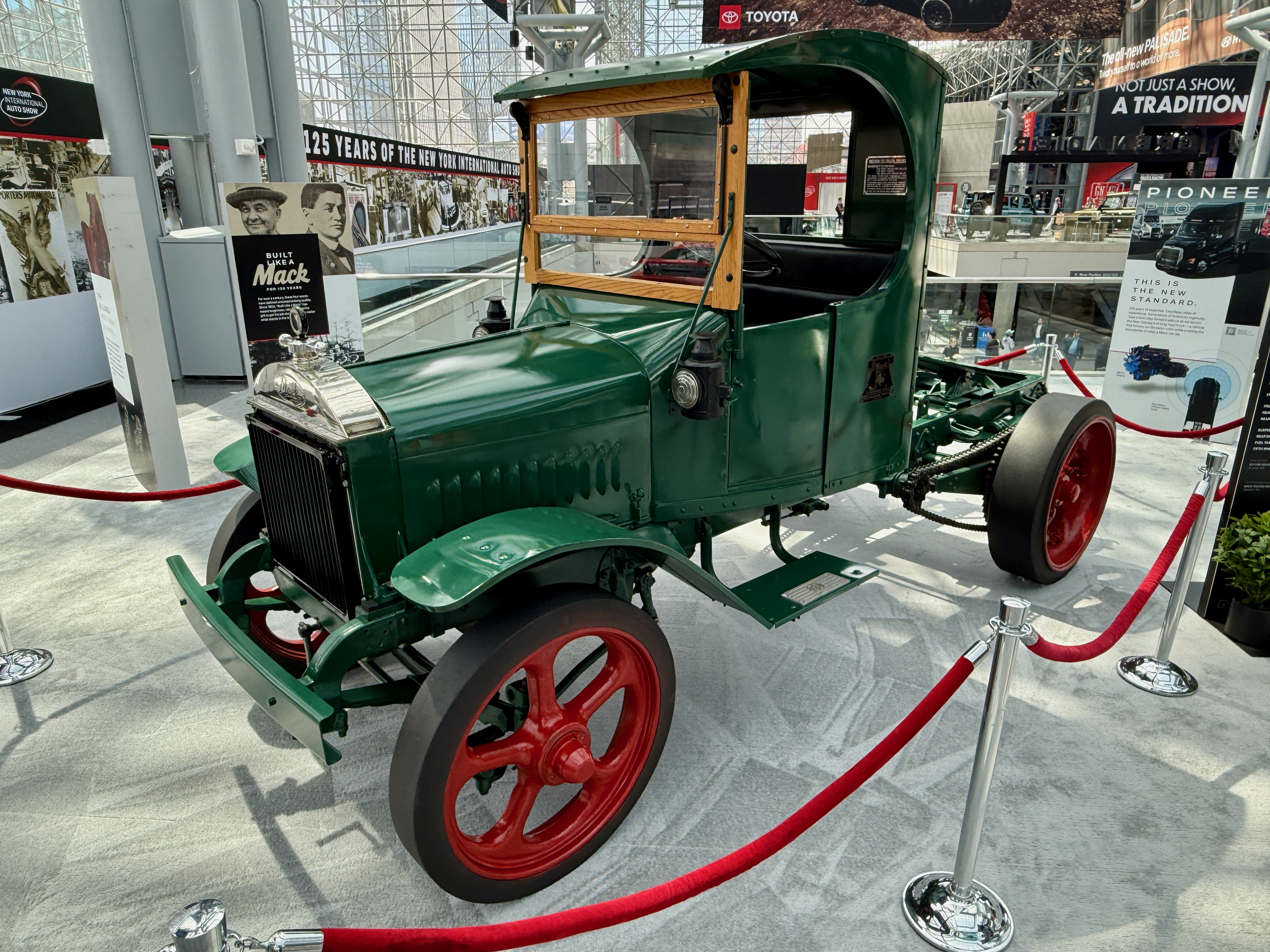
1925 Mack AB

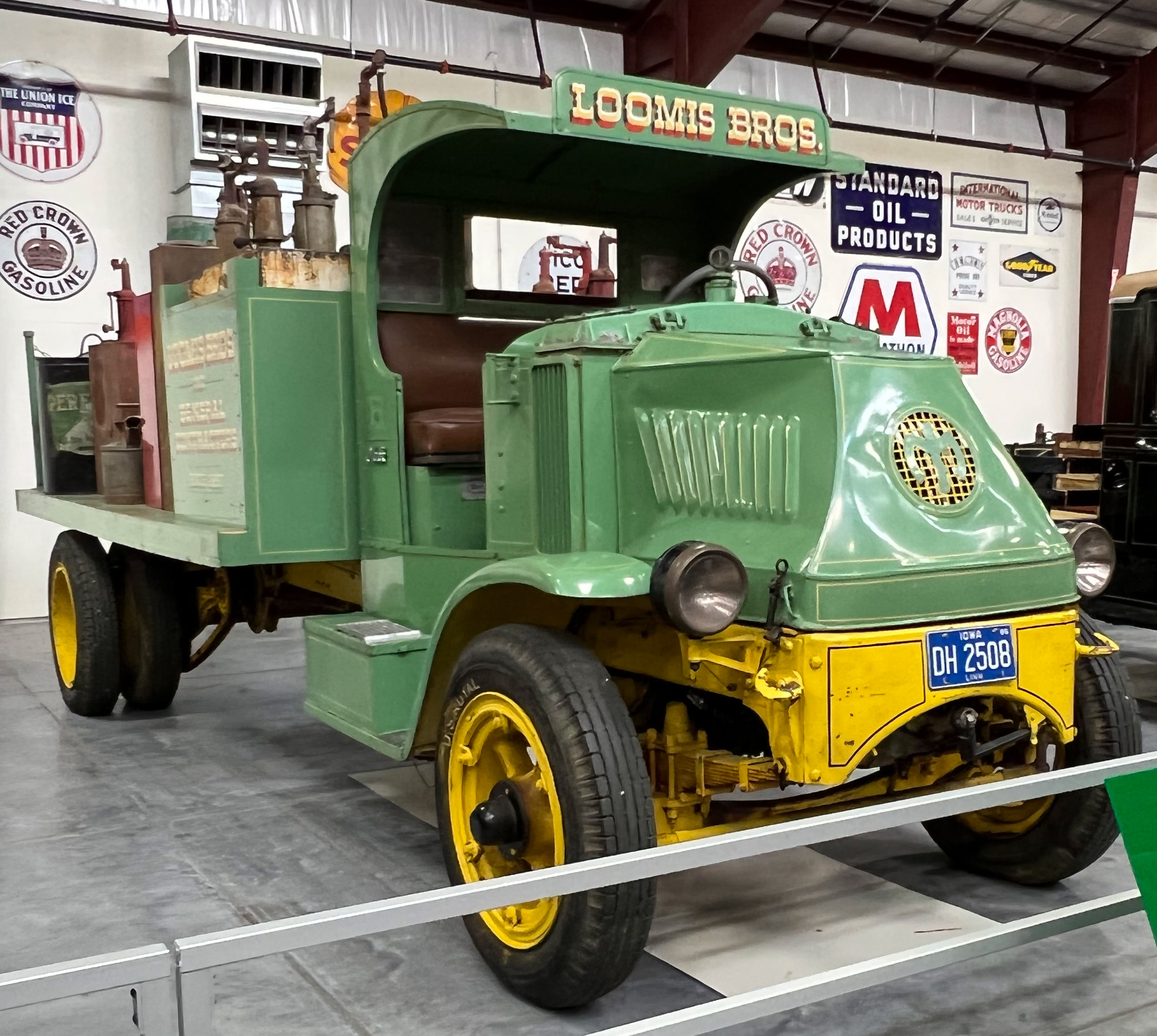
1929 Mack AC truck on display at the Iowa 80 Trucking Museum, Walcott, Iowa

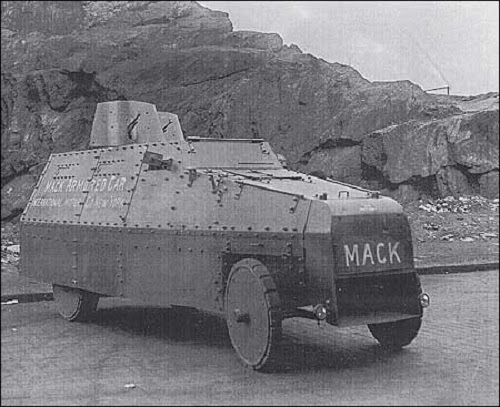
Mack AB Armoured Truck 1916

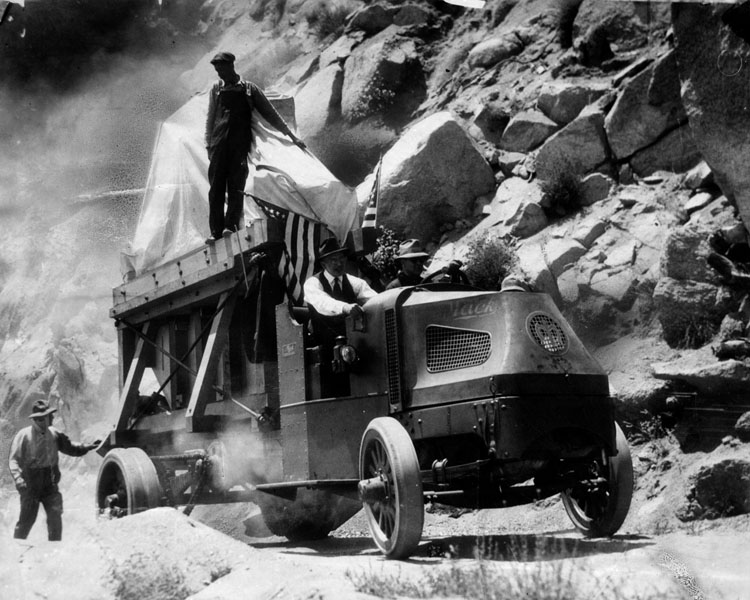
The Hale 100-inch mirror for Mount Wilson Observatory on its way up the Mount Wilson Toll Road on a Mack truck in 1917.

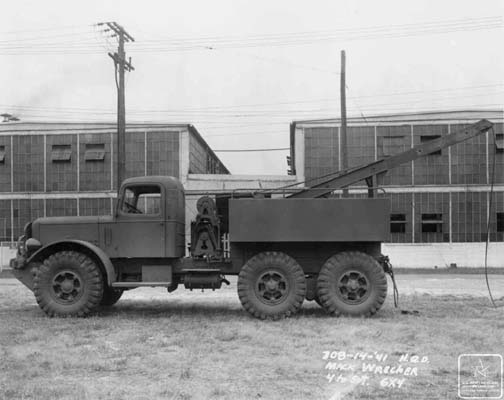
A May 15, 1941 photo of a Mack 6x4 N-model 4-to-6 ton wrecker

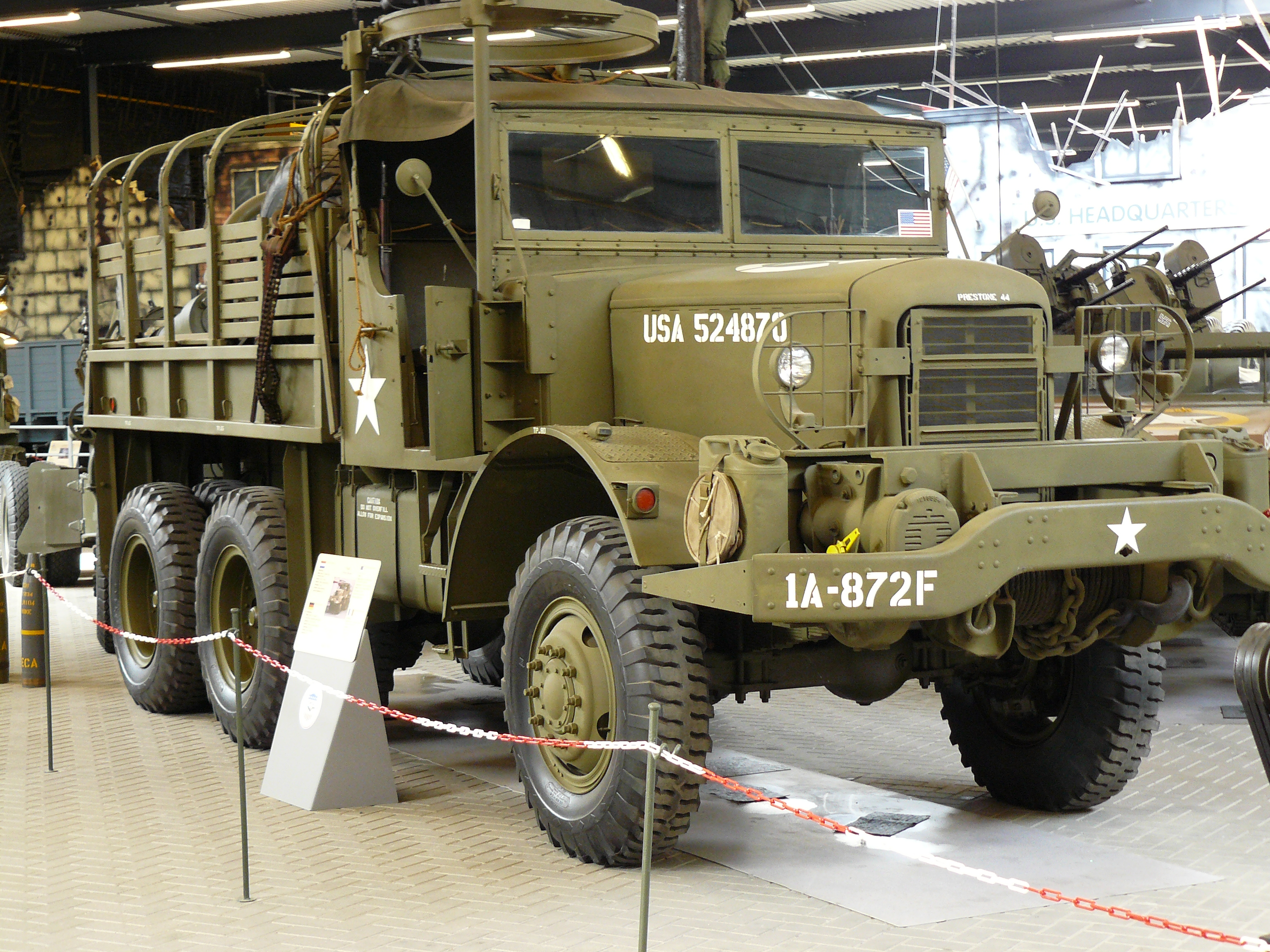
Mack NO-6 artillery tractor

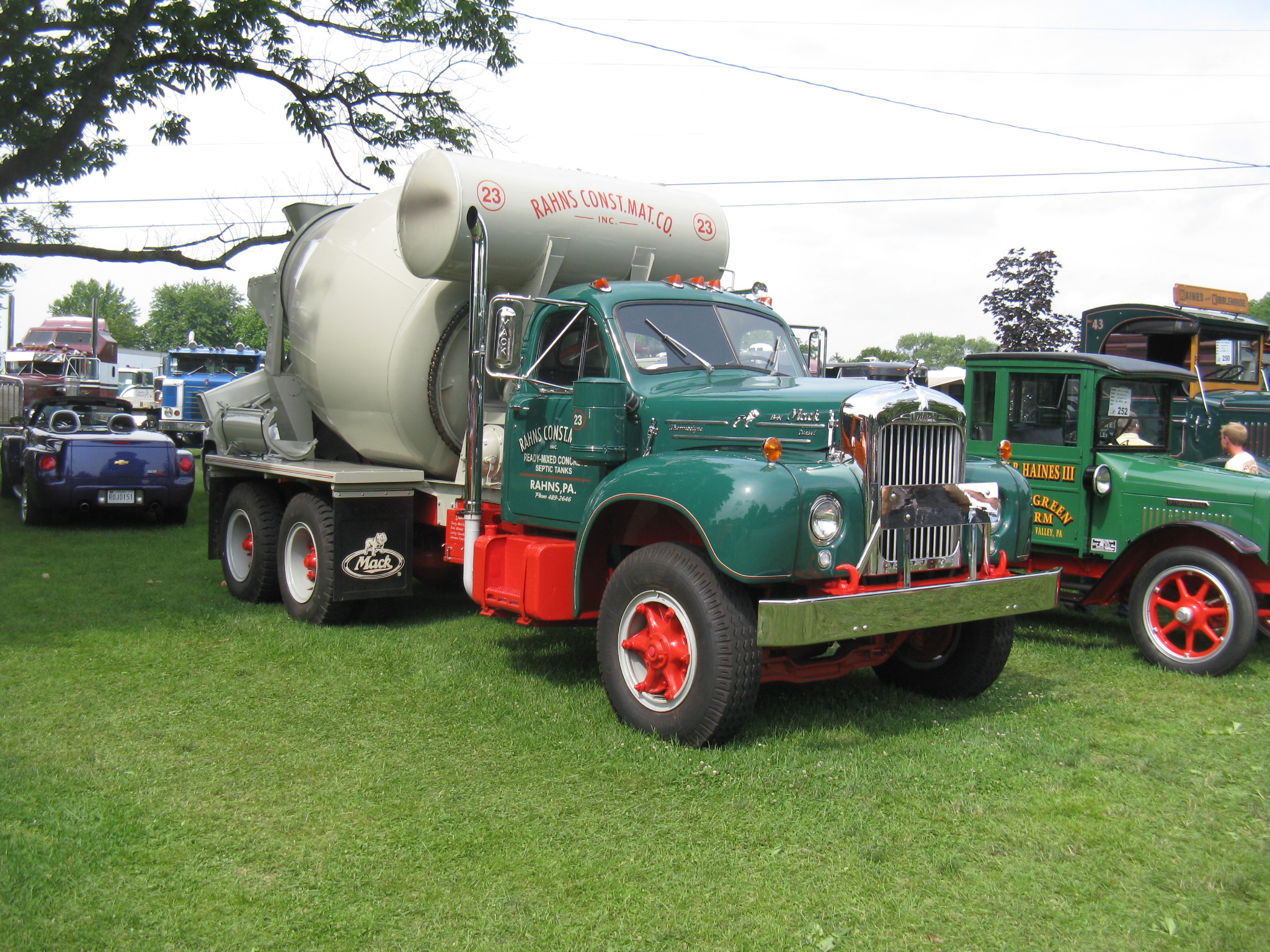
The Mack B Model (1953–1966) in Lower Macungie Township, Pennsylvania

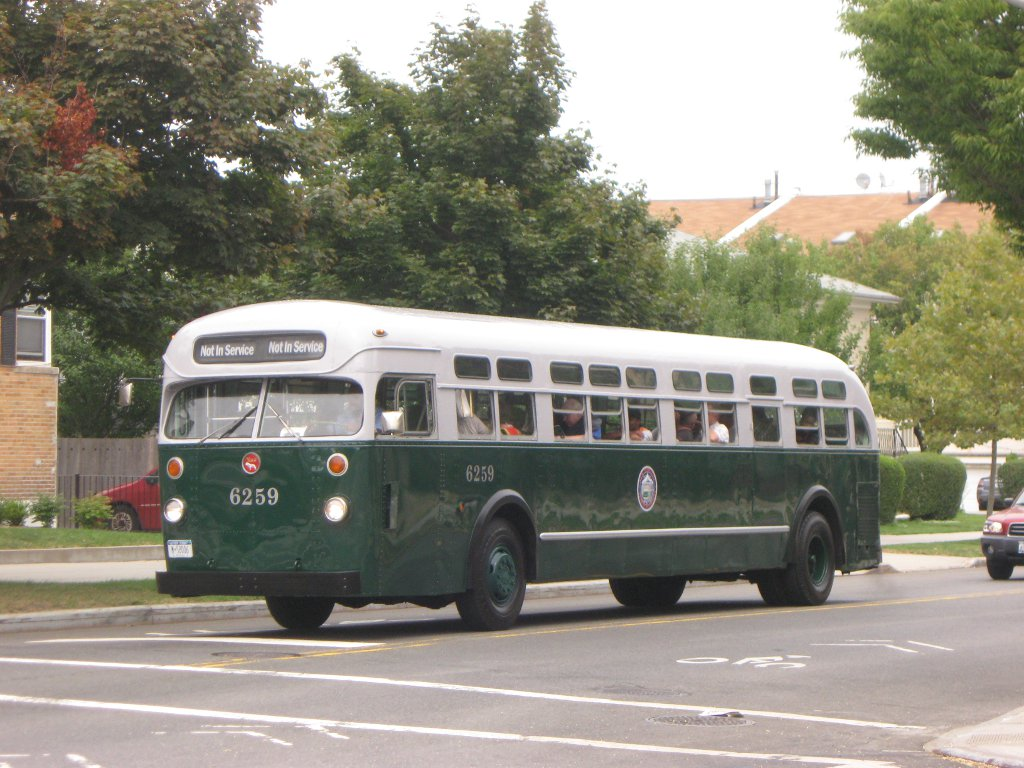
A Mack C-49-DT bus built in 1956

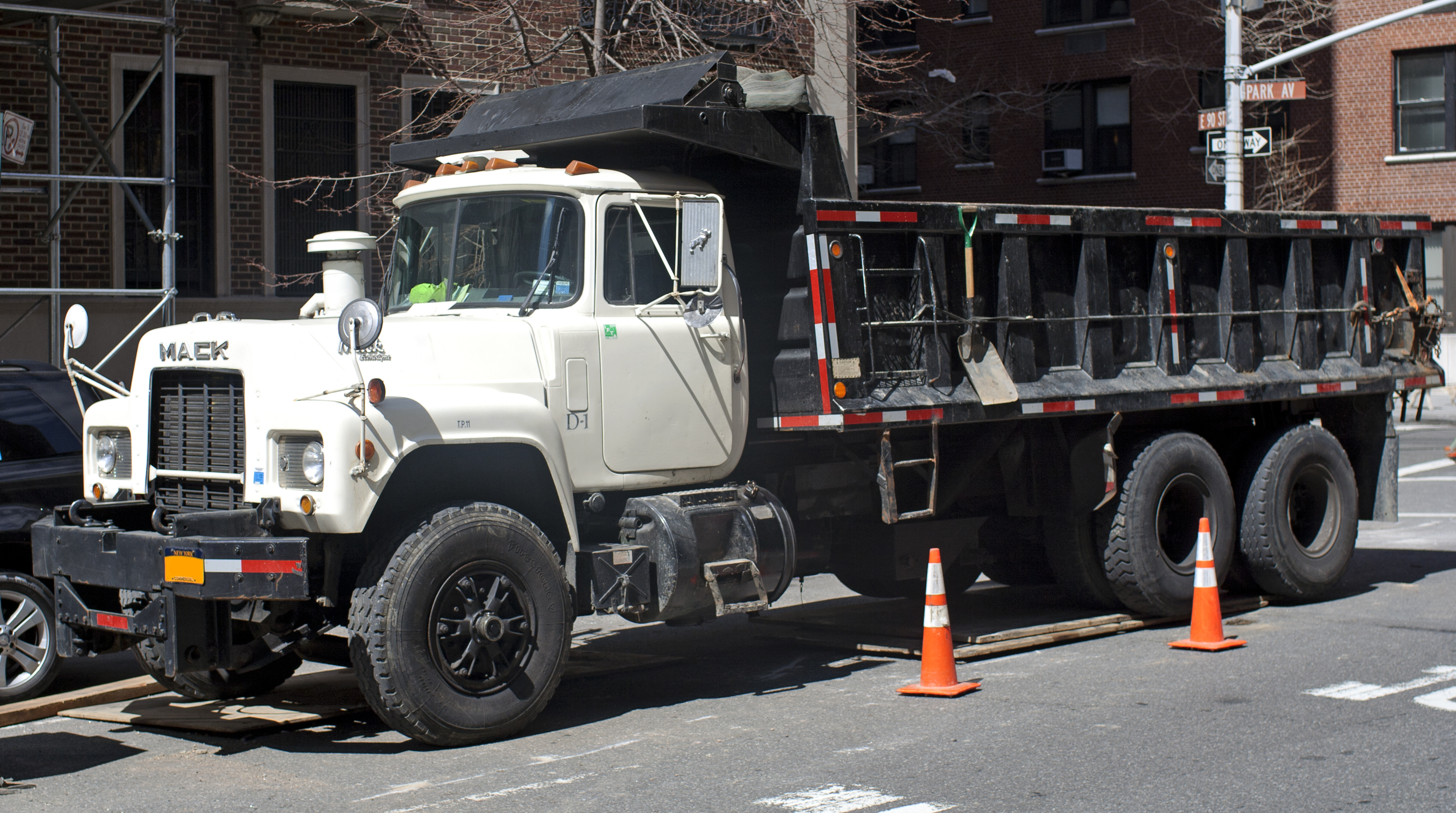
R Series (1965–2005)

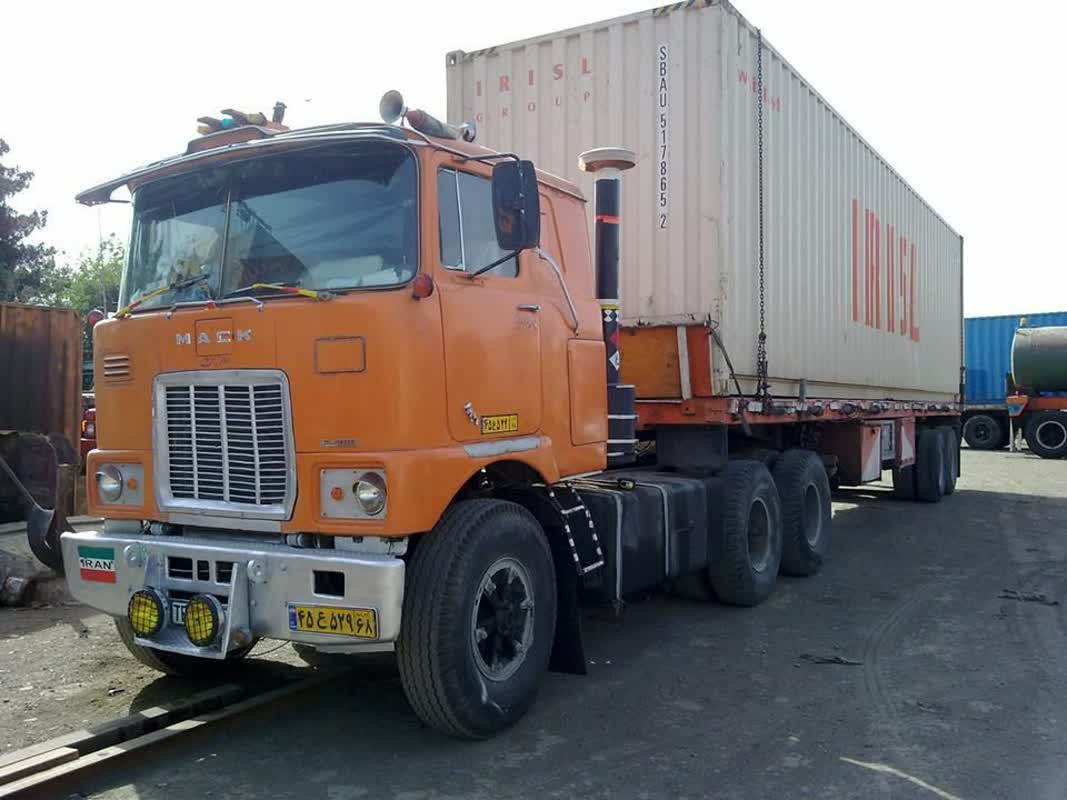
F Series (1962-1981)

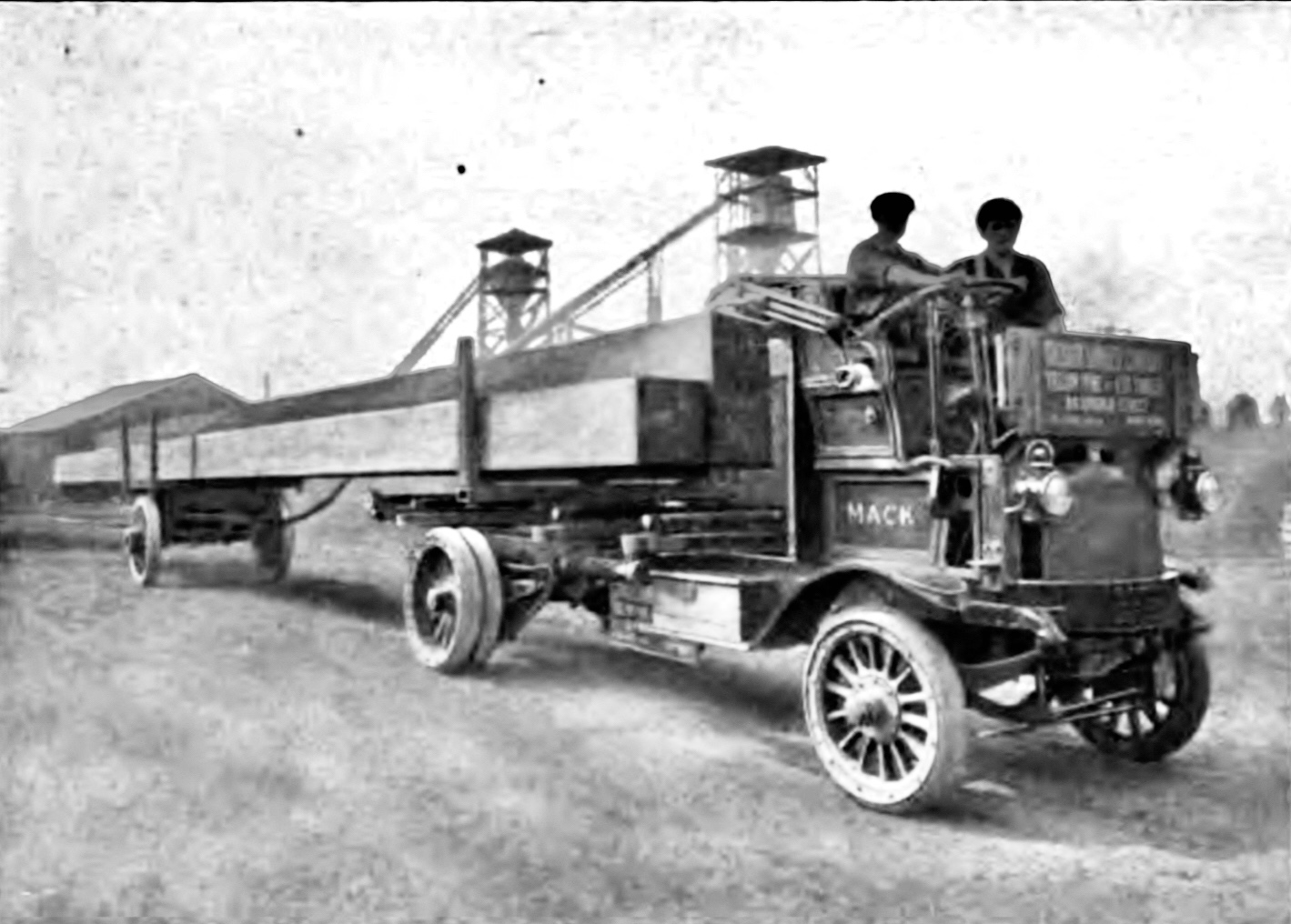
Mack Senior 5 t (1905-1915)

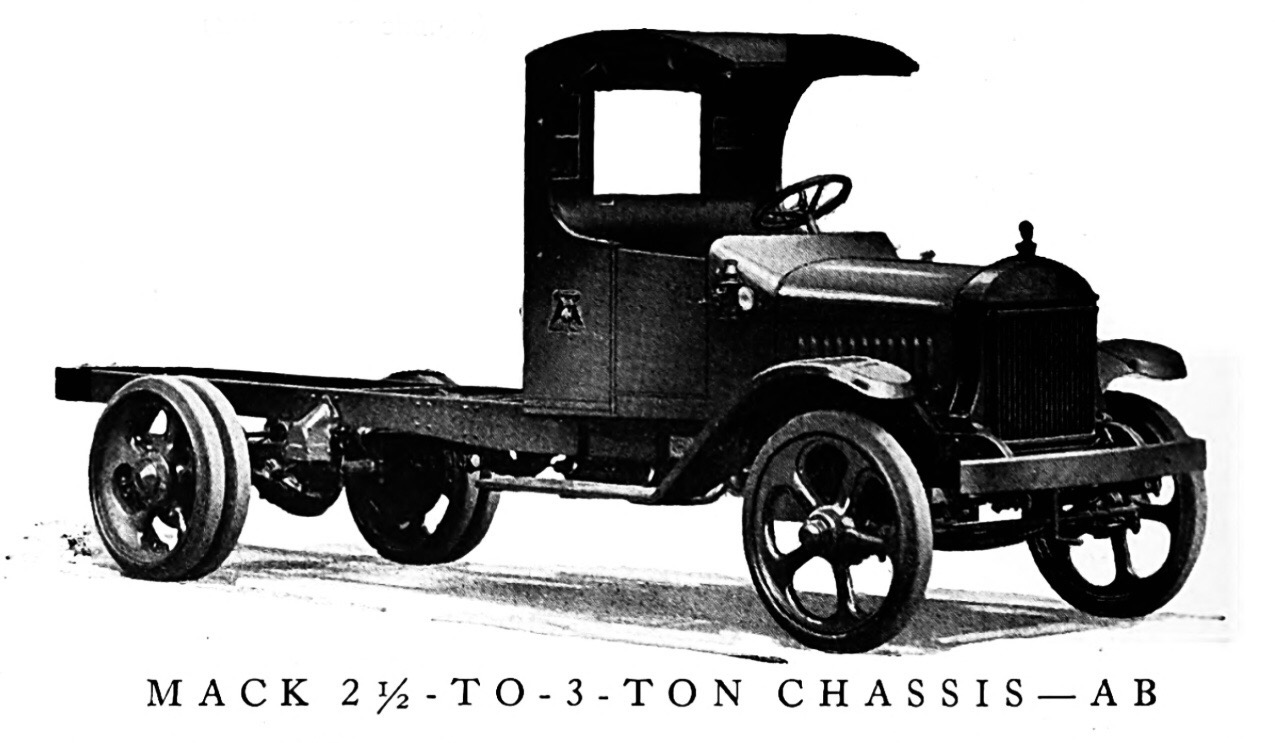
Mack AB (1914-1936)

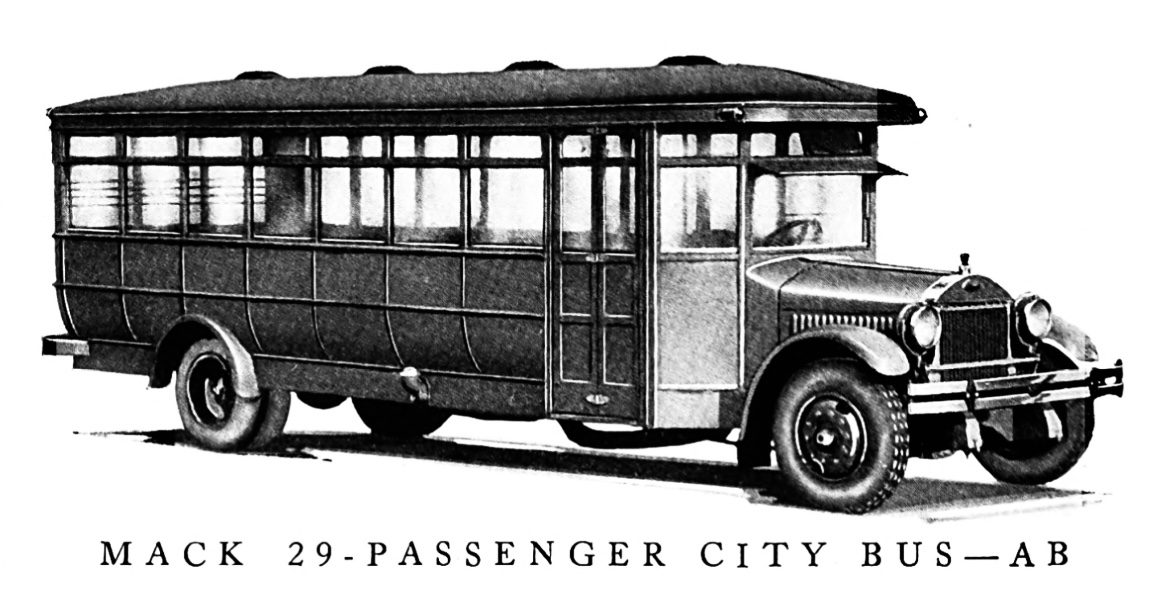
Mack AB (1925-1934).jpg

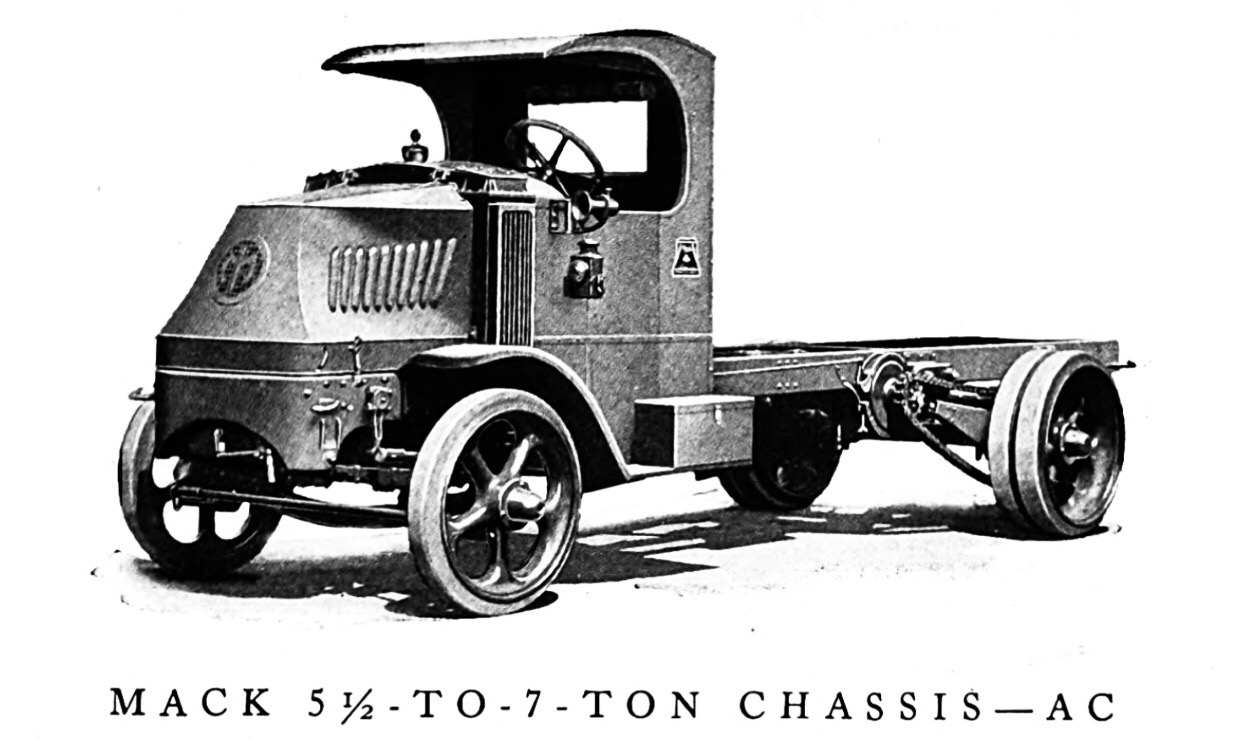
Mack AC (1915-1938)

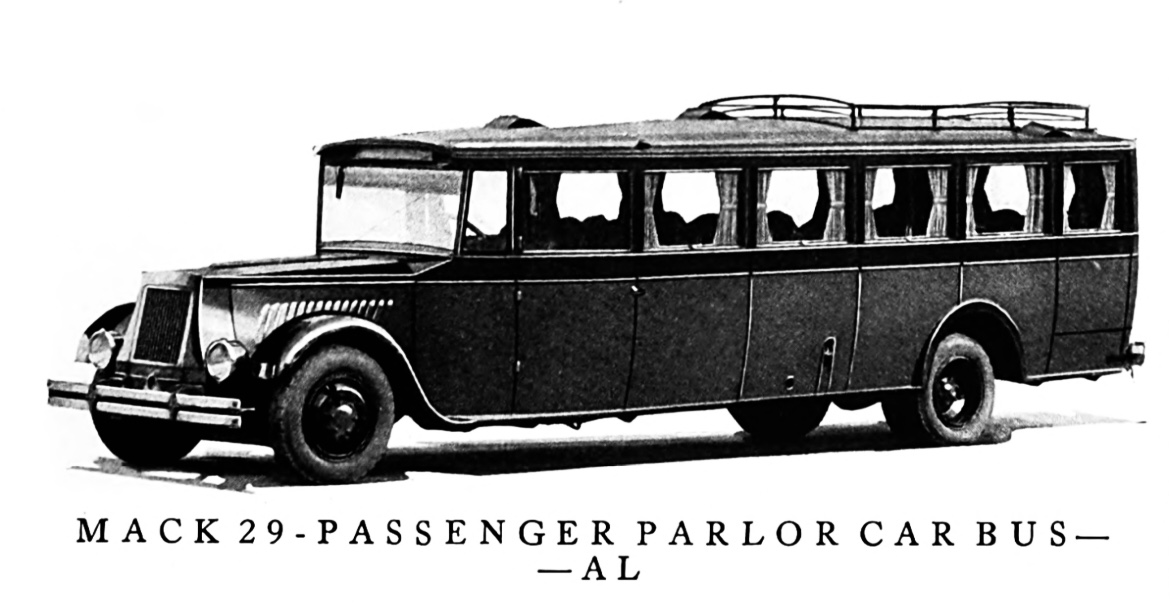
Mack AL (1926-1929)

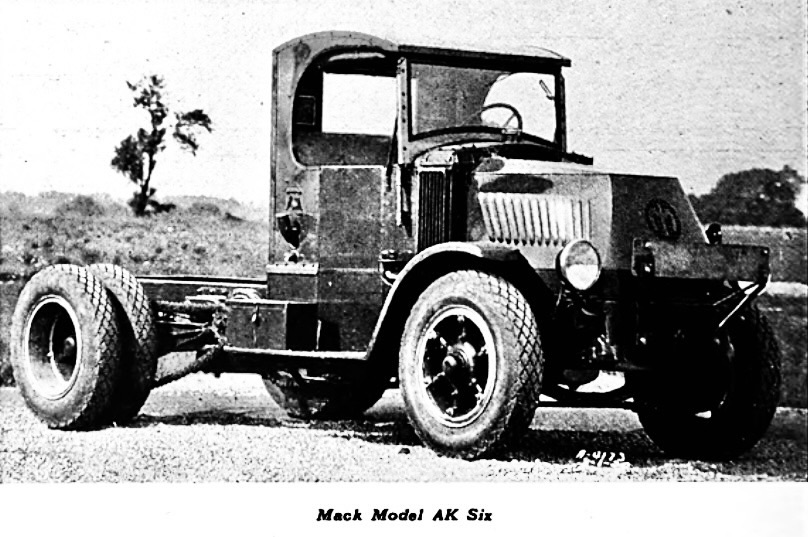
Mack AK-6 (1927-1936)

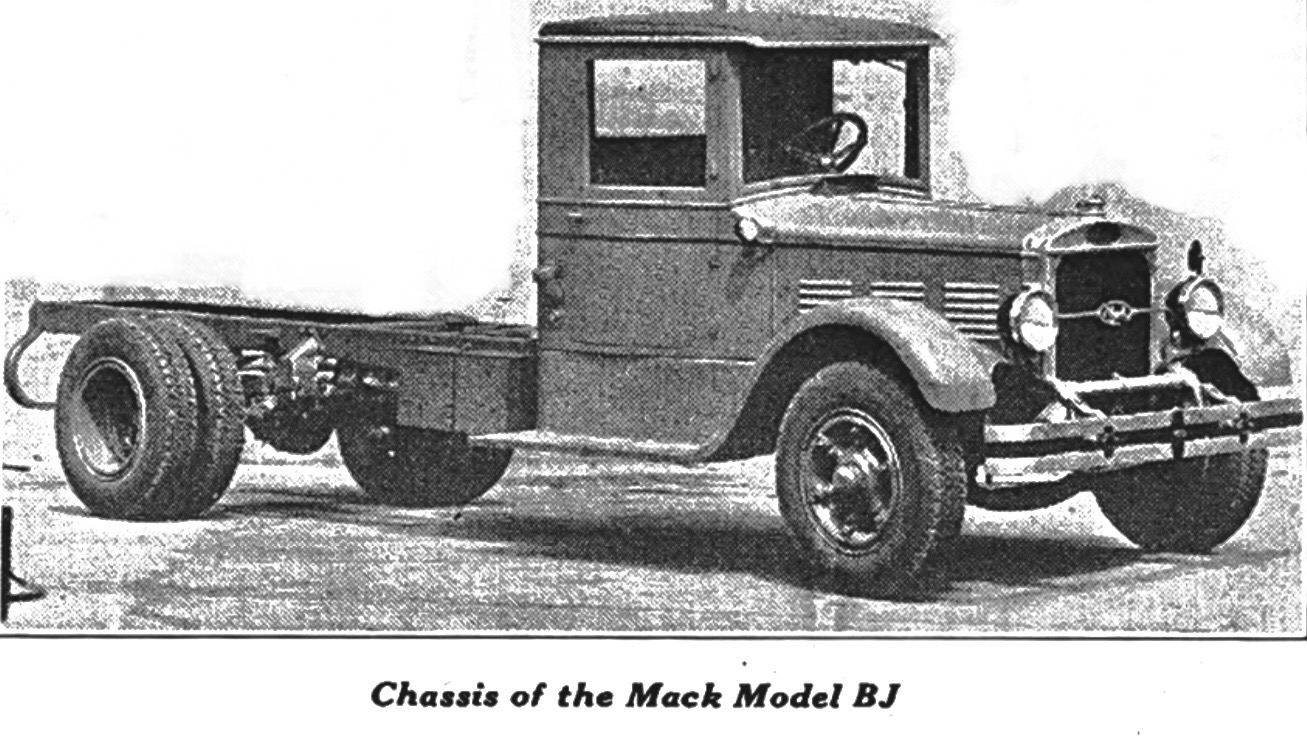
Mack Model BJ (1927-1933)

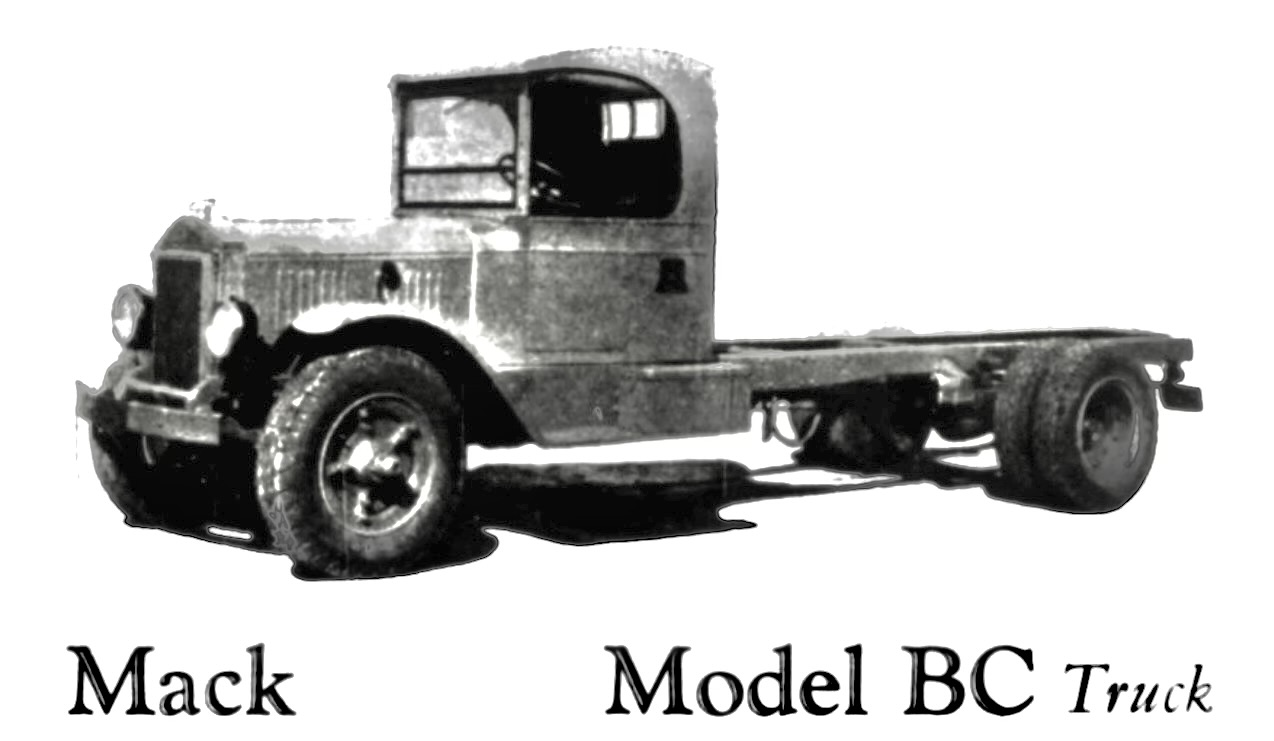
Mack Model BC (1929-1933)

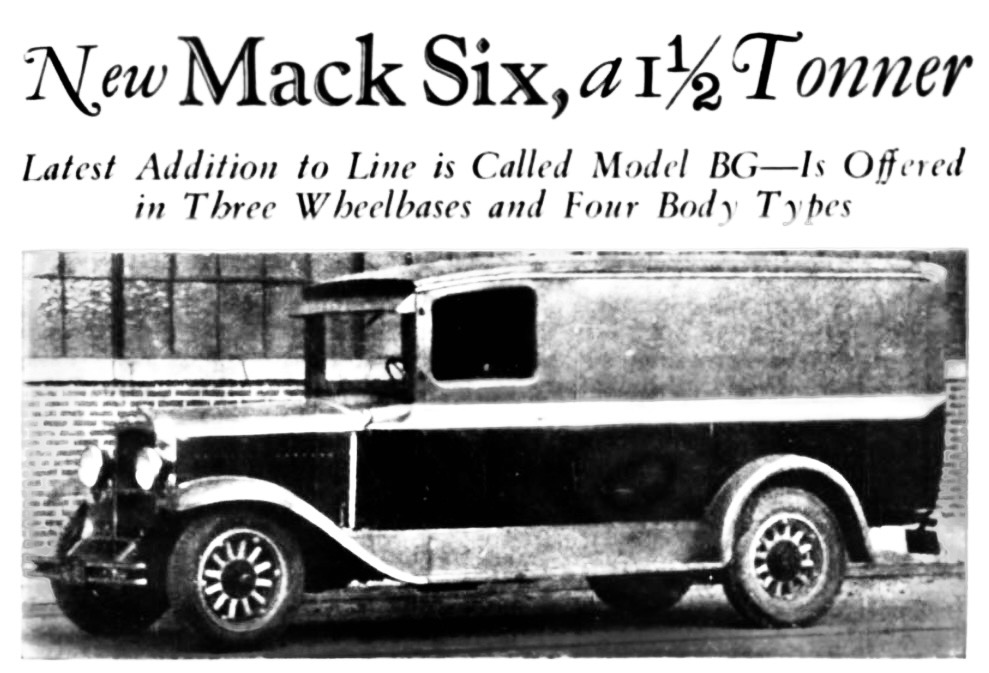
Mack Model BG (1930-1937) 1,5 to

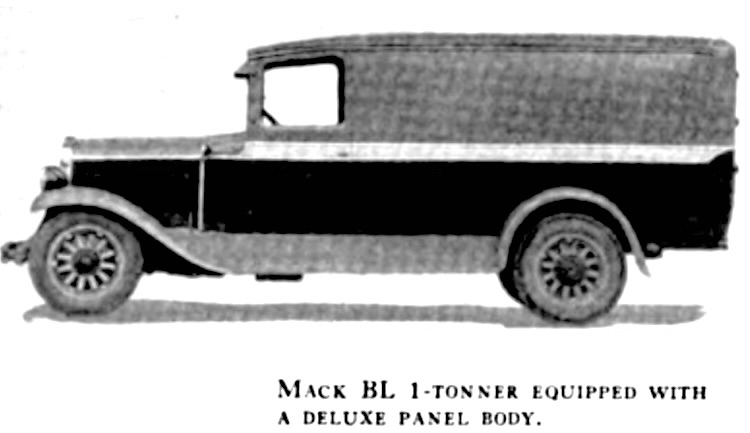
Mack Model BL (1929-1936) 1 to

- 1890: John M. ("Jack") Mack gets a job at Fallesen & Berry, a carriage and wagon company in Brooklyn
- 1893: John Mack and his brother Augustus F. ("Gus") Mack buy Fallesen & Berry
- 1894: A third Mack brother, William C. Mack joins his brothers in the company's operations. The Macks explore working with steam powered and electric motor cars
- 1900: The Macks open their first bus manufacturing plant. Ordered by a sightseeing company, the first "Mack bus" is delivered
- 1902: The Mack Brothers Company is established in Brooklyn
- 1904: Mack Brothers introduces the brand name "Manhattan" on its products
- 1905: Allentown is selected as the home of main manufacturing operations. A fourth Mack brother, Joseph Mack, becomes a stockholder. Mack also begins making rail cars and locomotives.
- 1910: The "Manhattan" brand trucks are rebranded as Mack trucks, and a fifth Mack brother Charles Mack joins the company.
- 1911: Headed by C.P. Coleman, The Saurer Motor Truck Company acquires rights to manufacture and sell heavy trucks under the Saurer brand name at its plant in Plainfield, New Jersey. On September 23, 1911, the Saurer Motor Truck Company merges with the Mack Brothers Motor Car Company of Allentown headed by J. M. Mack, forming the International Motor Truck Company (IMTC). IMTC continues to make and sell trucks using the Saurer name until 1918. In 1911, IMTC is capitalized at $2.6 million total ($1.6m or 61.5% for Saurer and $1.0m for Mack Brothers).
- 1912: Brothers John and Joseph Mack leave the company. Mack Truck acquires Hewitt Truck retaining Edward Ringwood Hewitt as consultant.
- 1916: Mack builds an armored truck (Mack AB Armored Truck) for the 1st Armored Motor Truck Battery of the New York State National Guard
- 1919: The United States Army conducts a transcontinental project using Mack Trucks to study the need for and feasibility of a new interstate highway system.
- 1922: The company name is changed to Mack Trucks, Inc. The bulldog is established as the company's corporate symbol.
- 1924: John Mack dies in a car crash in Weatherly, Pennsylvania.
- 1932: While recuperating from an operation, Mack's chief engineer Alfred Fellows Masury carves Mack's first bulldog hood ornament. Masury applies for and receives a U.S. patent for his design; the bulldog hood ornament adorns Mack trucks ever since.
- 1933: Mack Trucks (as the company is more widely becoming known) are used in building of many ambitious construction projects for the Work Projects Administration including the Hoover Dam.
- 1941: Fire Apparatus manufacturing is moved from Allentown, Pennsylvania, to Long Island City, in Queens, New York.
- 1951: Fire Apparatus manufacturing is moved from Long Island City back to Allentown
- 1956: Mack Trucks, Inc. buys Brockway Motor Company. (Brockway later ceases operations in 1977).
- 1966: Mack begins production at its new assembly plant in Oakville, Ontario, Canada. The facility is later closed in 1993.
- 1967: Mack Trucks becomes a part of the Signal Oil and Gas Company in a one-for-one exchange for cumulative convertible preferred stock. Later that year Signal changes its name to The Signal Companies.
- 1970: Mack moves into its new Allentown world headquarters.
- 1979: Renault buys a 10% shareholding
- 1982: Renault increases its shareholding to 20%, Signal reduces its stake to 10%.
- 1983: Mack Trucks conducts an IPO, issuing 15.7 million shares of common stock. Renault increases its holdings to 40% and Signal reduces its stake to 10.3% ownership.
- 1987: Renault reorganizes; Renault's Mack shares are transferred to Renault Véhicules Industriels.
- 1987: Mack Trucks moves class 8 operations to Winnsboro, South Carolina
- 1990: Mack Trucks becomes a wholly owned subsidiary of Renault Véhicules Industriels when the remaining publicly traded shares are acquired at $6.25 per share.
- 2001: Together with Renault Véhicules Industriels, Mack becomes part of Volvo Trucks; the parent company Renault receives a 20% stake in the combined company. (In 2002 Renault Véhicules Industriels changes its name to Renault Trucks).
- 2002: The plant in Winnsboro, South Carolina closes
- 2006: Mack has a record-sales year.
- 2008: Mack announces relocation of corporate headquarters to Greensboro, North Carolina.
- 2018: Mack has released the new Mack Anthem.
- 2021: US President Joe Biden visited the Mack Trucks plant in Pennsylvania in July 2021, where he was shown Mack's fully electric Class 8 truck, the Mack LR Electric. Mack had recently completed an upgrade of the facility with $84 million in funding.
- 2021: In July, Mack Trucks said it would hire 400 more employees at its facility in Lower Macungie, adding to a 2,500 overall workforce.
- 2021: In August 2021, it was reported that Mack had to suspend "production periodically" in July 2021 due to chip shortages.

=== Market, model and products timeline ===
This is a timeline of Mack Trucks history. Most of the information is taken from the Mack History page at MackTrucks.com, unless otherwise noted. Photos of most models 1906–1978 available at.

- 1909: A junior model 1 1/2-ton truck is introduced.
- 1910: Mack delivers the first motorized hook and ladder firetruck used by the city of Morristown, New Jersey.
- 1914: The Mack ABs are introduced
- 1916: The Mack ACs are introduced. Ultimately, over 40,000 of these models are sold.
- World War I: Mack delivers over 6,000 trucks to both the United States and British military. A legend surfaces that British soldiers would call for Mack Bulldogs to be sent when facing adversity.
- 1918: Mack becomes the first manufacturer to apply air cleaners and oil filters to their trucks.
- 1920: Mack Trucks are the first with power brakes on their trucks.
- 1922: Mack introduces first truck with a drive shaft instead of a chain on the Model AB
- 1922: International Motors Company develops gasoline-driven passenger railcar for the New York, New Haven and Hartford Railroad. A standard passenger railcar on top of a standard motor truck chassis, seating between 36 and 50 passengers, at a cost of $16,500. The car operates in a ten-mile (16 km) stretch between New Haven, and Derby, Connecticut.
- 1927: Mack's BJ and BB models built.
- 1932: The Bulldog starts to show up on the hoods of Mack trucks.
- 1934: Production of electric "trolley coaches" began, continuing only until 1943. A total of 290 trolley buses were built, with Portland, Oregon being by far the biggest customer (with 141 total).
- 1935 Mack sold 1515 trucks.
- 1936 Mack sold 4226 trucks.
- 1936: The Mack E series introduced. Mack Jr trucks introduced.
- 1938: Mack trucks is the first company to produce its own heavy-duty diesel engines.
- 1938 Mack sold 4406 trucks.
- 1939 Mack sold 6670 trucks.
- World War II: Mack trucks were used by the military in various capacities, and the company built many heavy-duty trucks to help the allied forces. From 1941 to 1945, the combined armed forces of the United States, Great Britain, France, and Canada took delivery of 35,096 vehicles. The combat "N Series" (NB, NJU, NM, NO, NR, etc.) accounted for 26,965 of the total. Commercial type vehicles including: trucks, off-highway, fire-trucks, trailers, and buses, accounted for the rest. A total of 2,053 NO models alone were produced from 1940 to 1945. The 7 1/2-ton 6x6 NO was the most important specifically military model, and could be used as a transport or tractor for the 155 mm Long Tom field gun. Mack also built over 2600 power trains for tanks. The Allentown bus plant (5C) built Vultee PBY Catalina flying boats as well as components for the BT-13 Valiant Trainer and B-24 Liberator Bombers. More than 700 NJU (5-to-6 ton 4x4) models were in the hands of the U.S. Army by 1942. In 1939 & 1940 the French and British received several hundred NR4 and EXBU models. Mack Trucks ranked 63rd among United States corporations in the value of World War II military production contracts.
- 1940: L Model series introduced, continuing until 1952.
- 1950: The Mack A Model series of trucks is introduced, produced until 1953.
- 1953: The Mack B Model series of trucks is introduced. 127,786 produced until 1966.
- 1955: The D Model low cab forward city delivery truck entered the market. Access to the engine compartment was possible by the Verti-lift cab. The cab lifted straight up hydraulically, guided by a forklift style mast behind the cab. Two styles of D Models were produced, the first styling had a square grille and no dress up trim. It was produced in 1955 and early 1956. The second styling included a styled grille, cab rear corner windows and stylish emblems and trim. The second styling was built from mid 1956 until the end of the D Model in 1958. A total of 832 D Model Mack Trucks were produced from 1955 until 1958.
- 1955: The military M123 10 ton 6X6 semi tractor went into production. Developed from the NO, it would be the US Army's standard until replaced by the M911 starting in 1976.
- 1956: Mack buys the tooling of the Ahrens-Fox Fire Engine Co. and introduced the Mack C Model cab forward fire engine which was an Ahrens-Fox design and the first of the "Cincinnati Cabs" (later built by the Truck Cab Manufacturing Co. an OEM vendor builder of Cincinnati, Ohio), that have been the staple of the American fire service to this day.
- 1959: The first aluminum rivetted construction COE (cab-over-engine) family of trucks is introduced: The G Model which had a short production due to a striking resemblance to the Kenworth COE and Mack having the F Model ready for production. A total of 2181 G Model
- 1960: City of Hamilton, Bermuda buys first Mack built diesel-power fire truck in a B Model Chassis.
- 1962: The second of the COE (cab-over-engine) family of trucks is introduced: The F Model all steel sleeper (FL) or non sleeper (F) is the first of this family of models for Mack.
- 1965: Mack releases the Super Pumper System, to be used by the New York City fire department. It would help put out 2,200 fires.
- 1965: The R Model Series introduced, to replace the B Model Series. Some R series models continue in production until 2005.
- 1966: The RL (for R-Western) model built at Hayward, California until 1981.
- 1967: The CF model Fire Engine introduced, replacing the C model. The CF was a cab forward adaptation of the cab over style commercial "F" Model cab.
- 1969: Mack patents the cab air suspension.
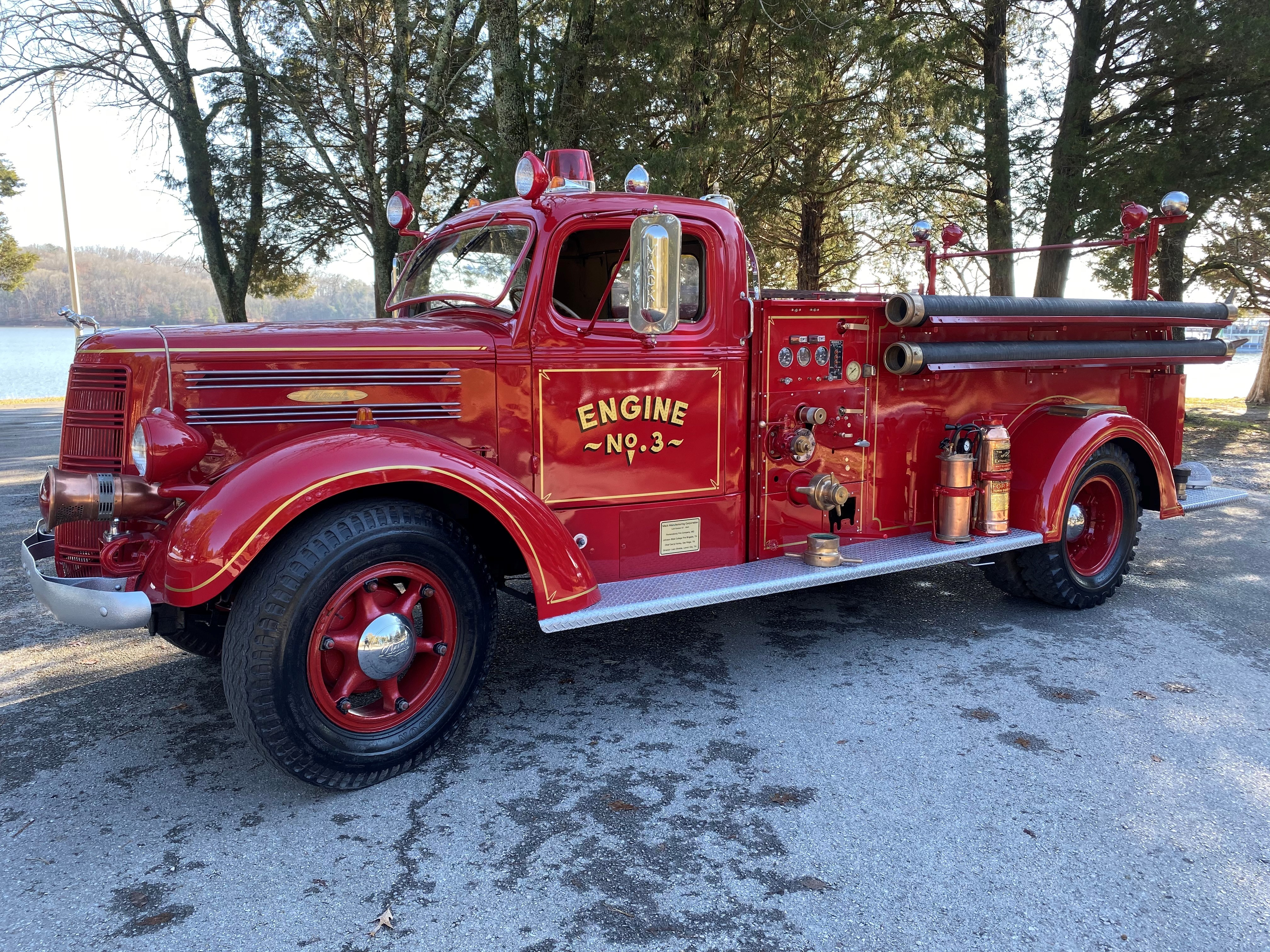
- 1944 Model 45S Apparatus E Series built 1937–1950
  1975: Macungie plant opens, build the Cruise-Liner series until 1983.
- 1977: Super-Liner introduced, production runs for 15-years until 1993.
- 1978: Introduction of the low-cab-forward urban MC/MR series.
- 1979: Medium-duty model Mid-Liner introduced, built by Renault Véhicules Industriels in France. This lighter truck filled a gap at the lower end of Mack's spectrum, as they were almost unrepresented in the Class 6 segment. Before the introduction of the Mid-Liner, the smallest engine made by Mack had been the 210 hp diesel inline-six ETZ 477.
- 1982: Production of the MH Ultra-Liner model begins.
- 1988: Mack introduces the CH series for highway applications.
- 1989: E7 engine replaces E6 engine
- 1990: Fire Apparatus production ends.
- 1994: Mack introduces the LE (low entry) refuse vehicle.
- 1998: Electronic Unit Pump (EUP) replaces electronic fuel injection pump
- 1999: A new premium highway tractor is introduced: the "Vision by Mack".
- 2000: Mack builds 100 limited edition Visions with black paint and custom gold stripes and stainless badges for the 100th anniversary
- 2001: Medium-duty Freedom series introduced (built by Renault Trucks in France like its predecessor, the Mid-Liner series).
- 2001: Mack redesigns R Series dash with new gauges and buttons and door padding.
- 2001: Granite series for construction applications introduced.
- 2003: Mack pulls out of the medium-duty market and discontinues the Freedom series.
- 2006: Introduction of Pinnacle highway vehicle, a replacement for the Vision highway product.
- 2007: A new product line is introduced to include Models LEU and MRU amongst others.
- 2007: Introduction of US07 compliant engines in all of its trucks.
- 2008: In March, Mack introduces the Titan, a heavy duty model with a 16-liter big-block MP10, the largest ever 6-cylinder engine from Mack, with 515, 565, and 605 horsepower (451 kW) models.
- 2010: In October Mack announced that a version of its Terrapro Cabover would run on natural gas using a Cummins Westport engine.
- 2017: Mack discontinues the Titan with the last one rolling off line mid-summer.
- 2017: Mack introduces the Anthem, a new on-highway tractor replacing the Pinnacle Axle back model.
- 2025: On April 8, Mack announced a brand new class 8 tractor, the Pioneer in Brooklyn, New York.

== Products ==
=== Current models ===
==== North America ====
^{List of current models produced for the North American market:}

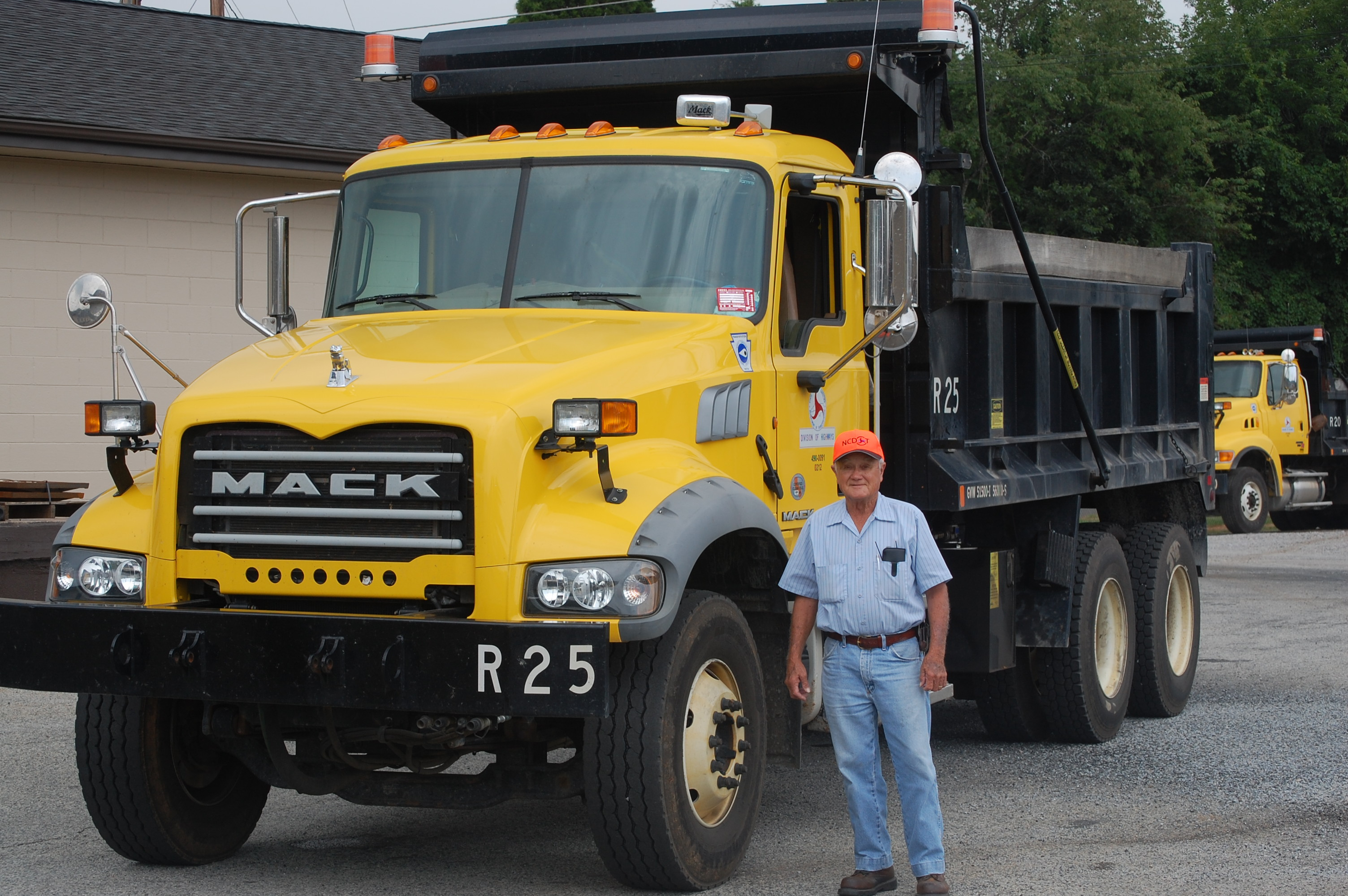
Granite Dump truck

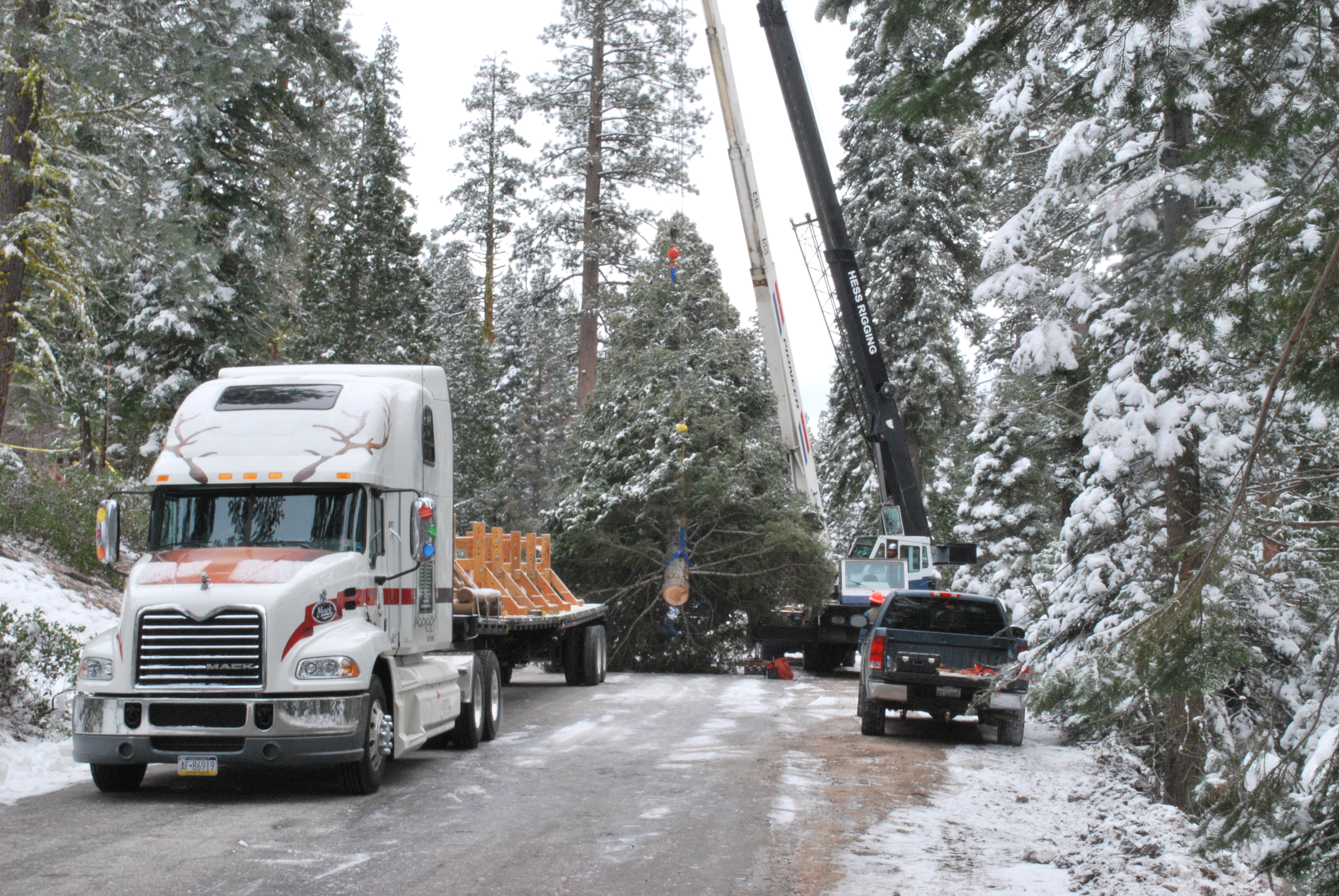
Pinnacle Semi tractor

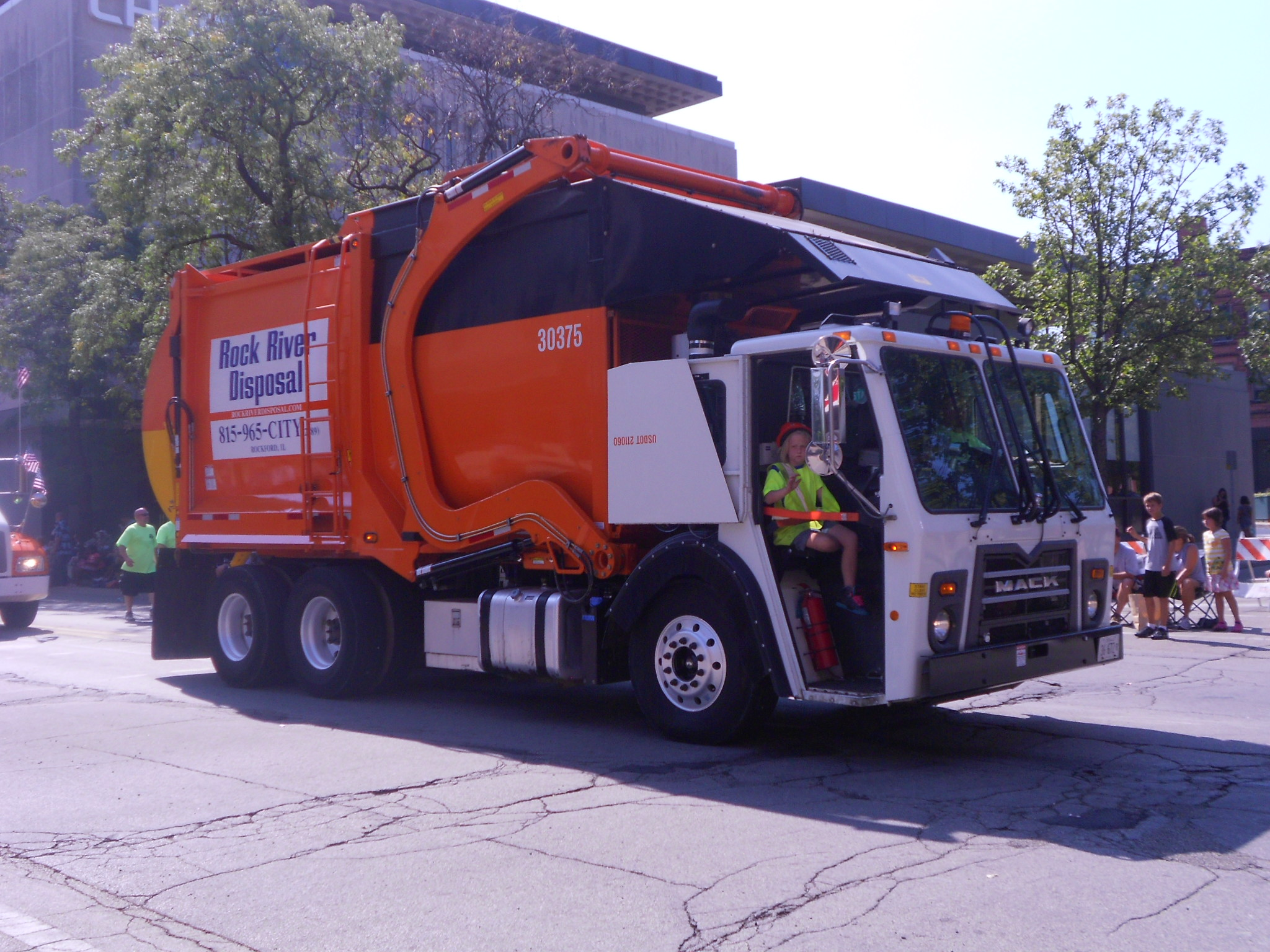
TerraPro LE Refuse truck

- Construction Series:
  - Granite
    - Granite Axle Back
    - MD
  - TerraPro Cabover
- Highway Series:
  - Anthem
  - Pinnacle:
  - Pioneer
    - Pinnacle Axle Forward
    - Pinnacle DayCab
    - Pinnacle Sleeper
    - Pinnacle Rawhide Edition
  - Granite
- Refuse Series:
  - LR
  - TerraPro Cabover
  - TerraPro Low Entry
  - Granite Axle Back
  - Granite
- Military:
  - Granite Armored Line Haul
  - Kerax 8 x 8

==== Australia, New Zealand and South Africa ====
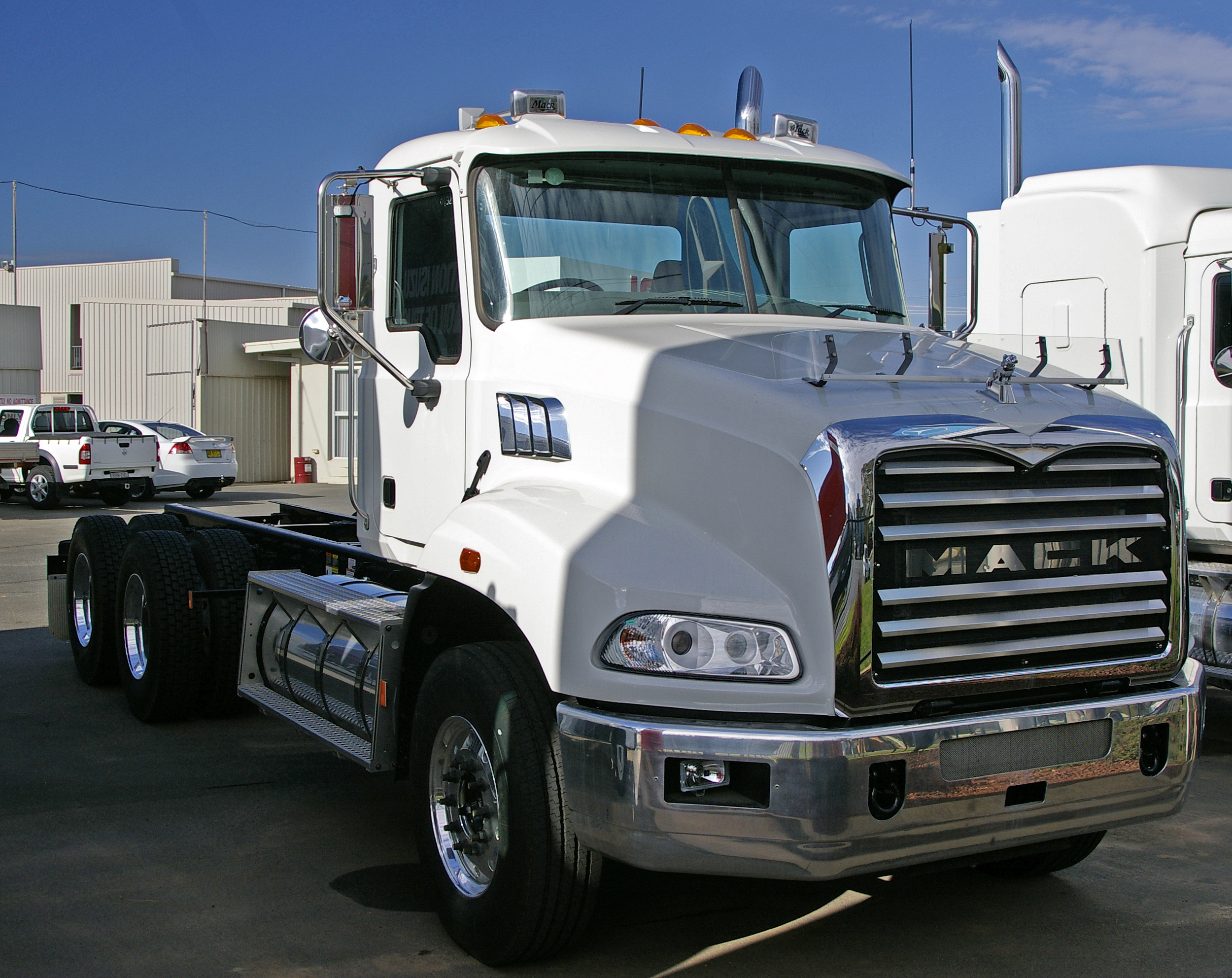
Mack Granite in Australia

^{List of current models produced for the Australian, New Zealand, and South African market at the Wacol, Queensland factory.}

- Granite (Discontinued)
- Metro-Liner
- Anthem (Launched 2021)
- Super-Liner
- Titan
- Trident
  - Trident Axle Forward
  - Trident Axle Back
- TerraPro (Overseas order through Mack Trucks Australia)
  - TerraPro Cabover
  - TerraPro Low Entry

=== Fire apparatus products ===
Mack Trucks built complete fire apparatus in Allentown from 1911 until 1984. In addition to building pumpers, Mack also offered aerial trucks using ladder assemblies supplied by other manufacturers, notably American LaFrance and Canadian builder Pierre Thibault. Many still serve with fire departments around the world.

In the 1970s, Mack started selling their chassis to other fire apparatus manufacturers. Production of Mack-chassised fire trucks continues for use in fire departments throughout North America and around the world.

==== Fire apparatus gallery ====
Fire apparatus gallery

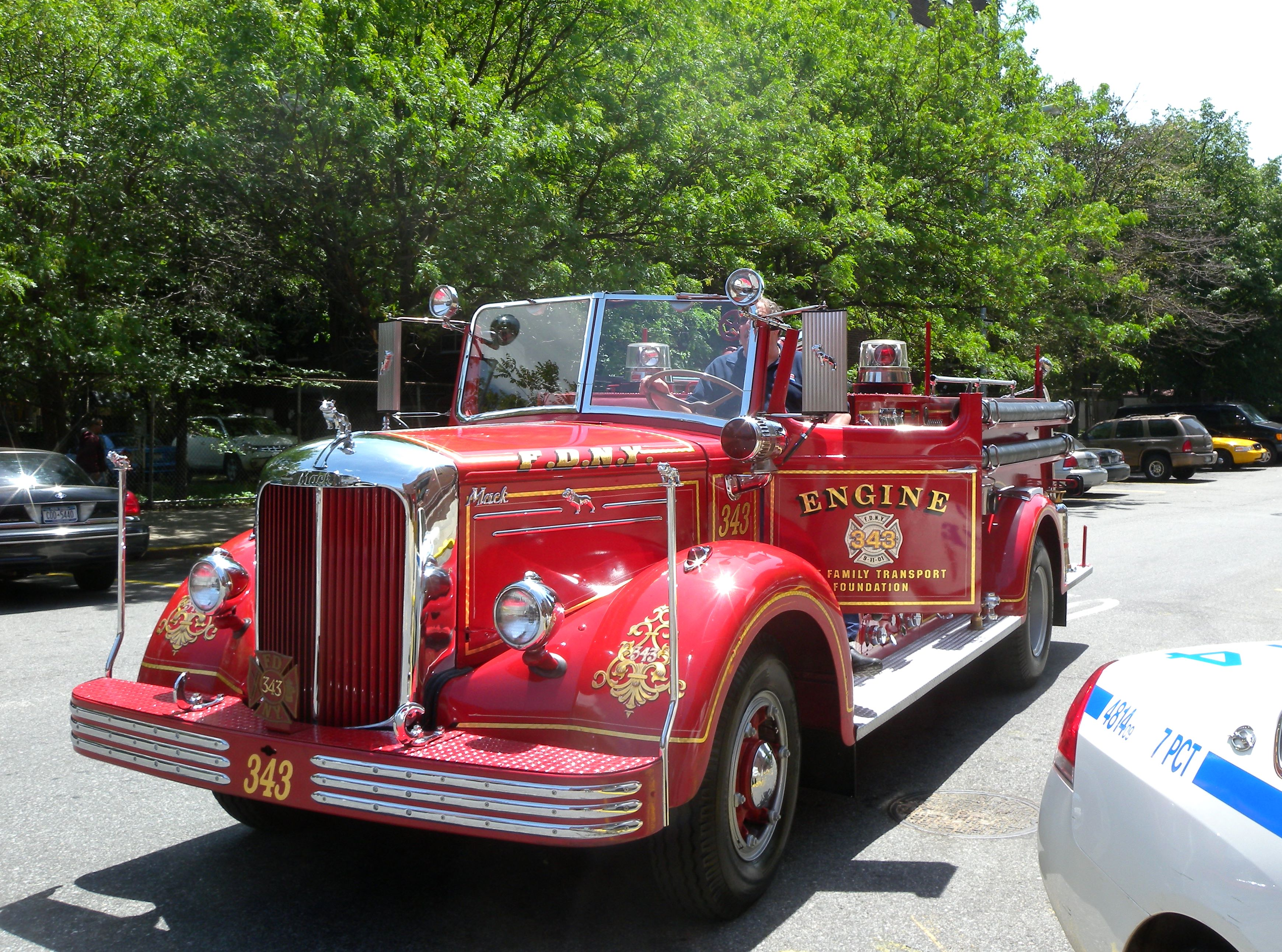

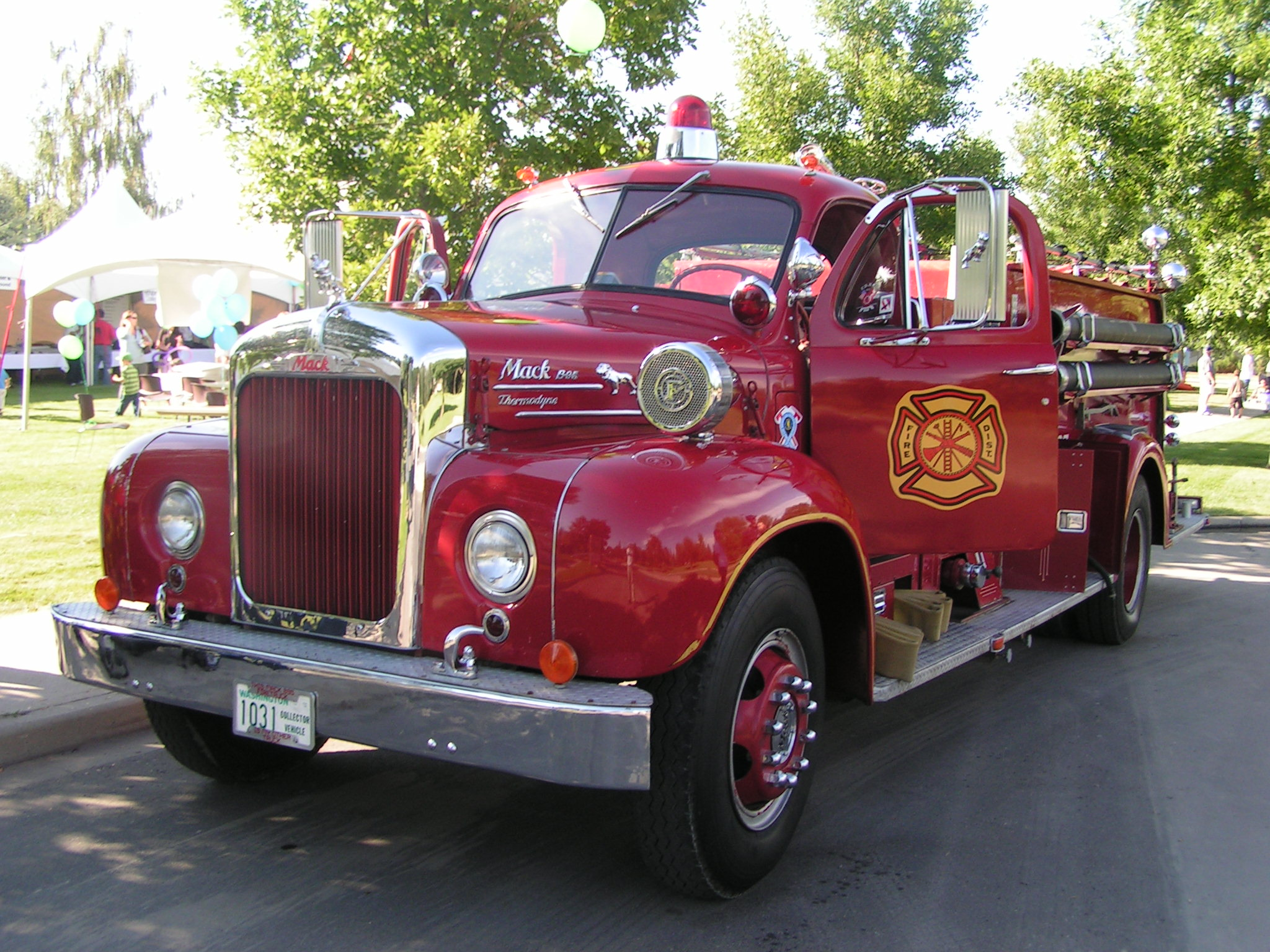
1961 B95

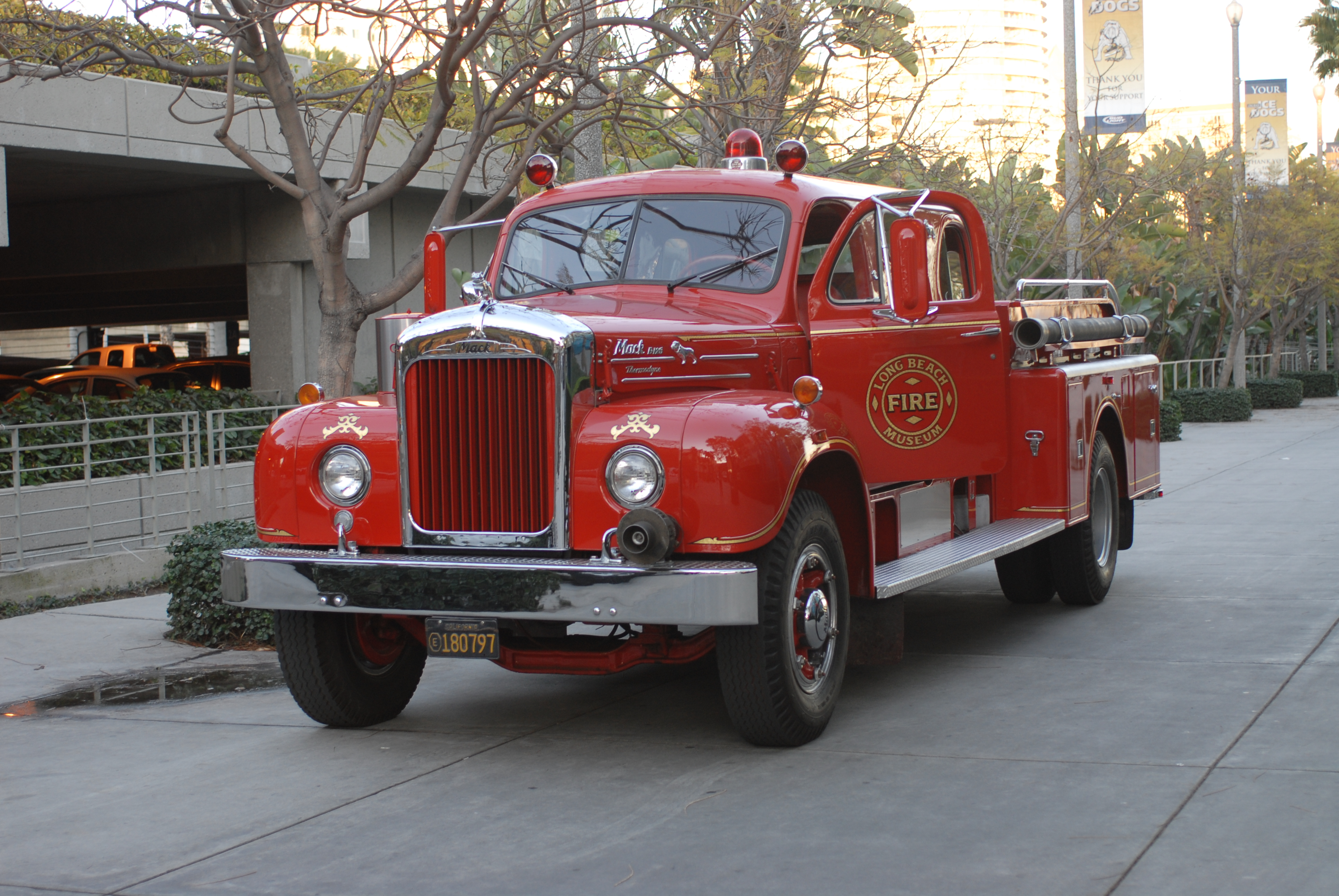
Long Beach Fire Department antique truck

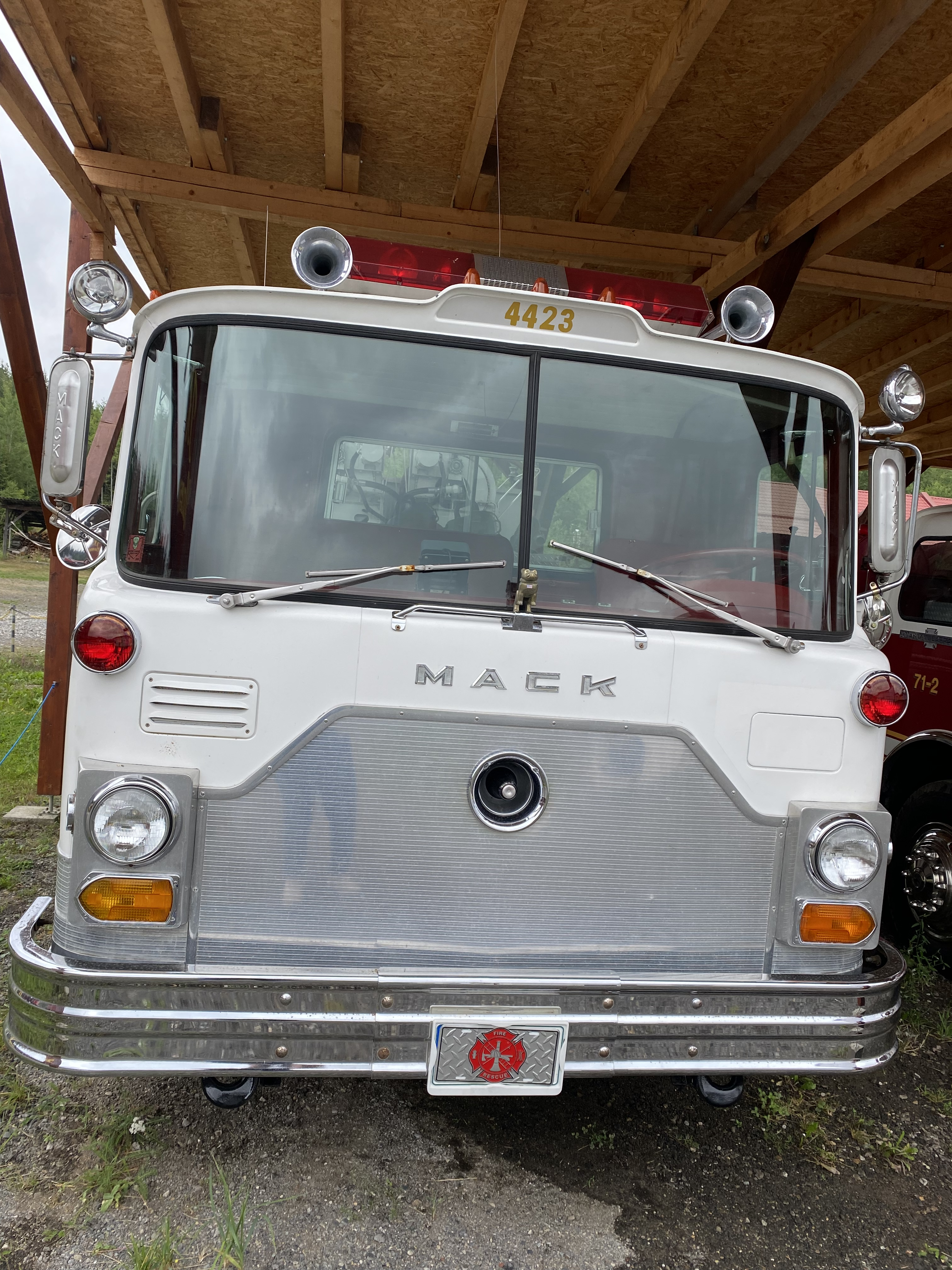
1971 Mack CF685F

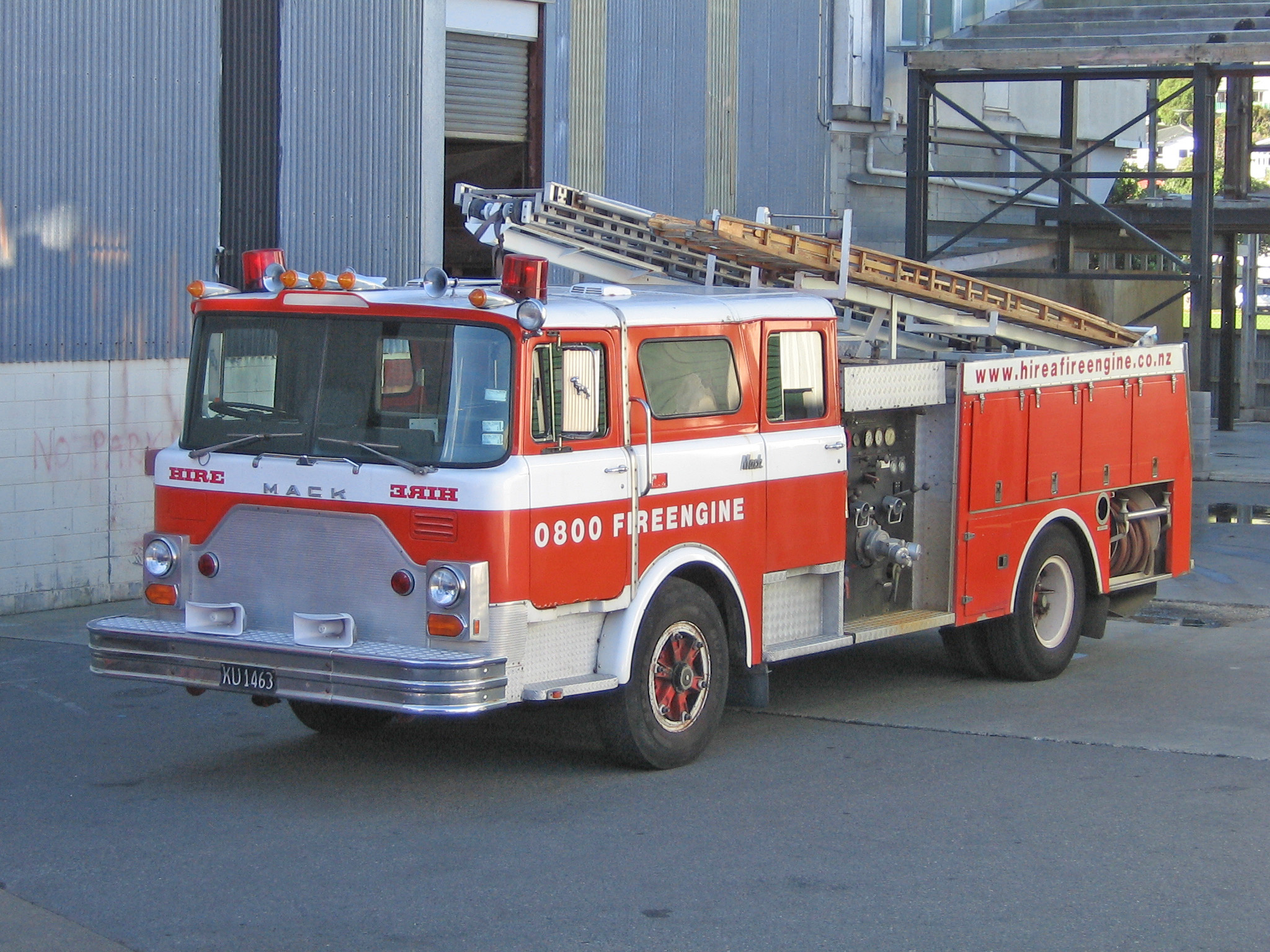
1982 CF685

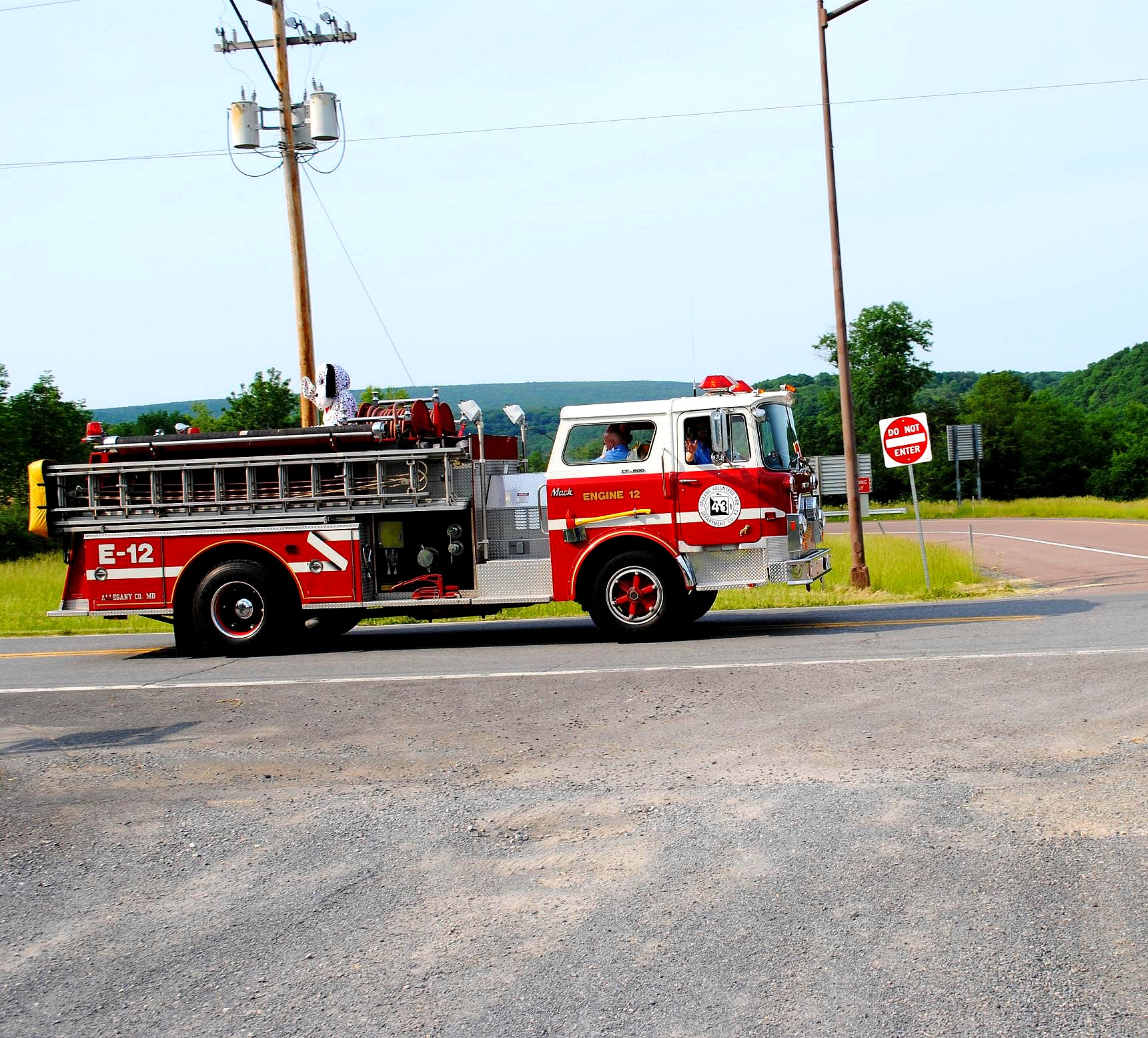
CF

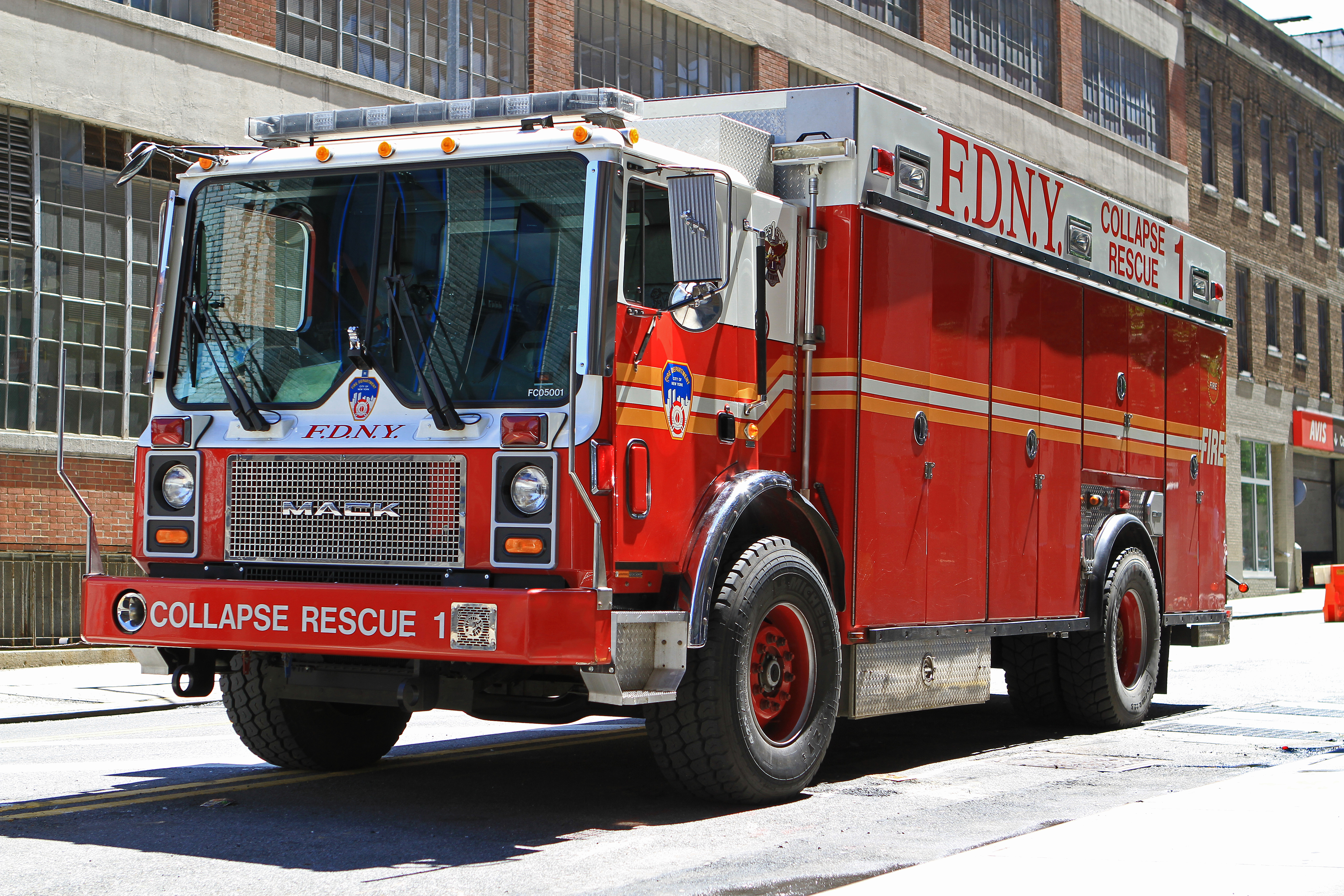
MR

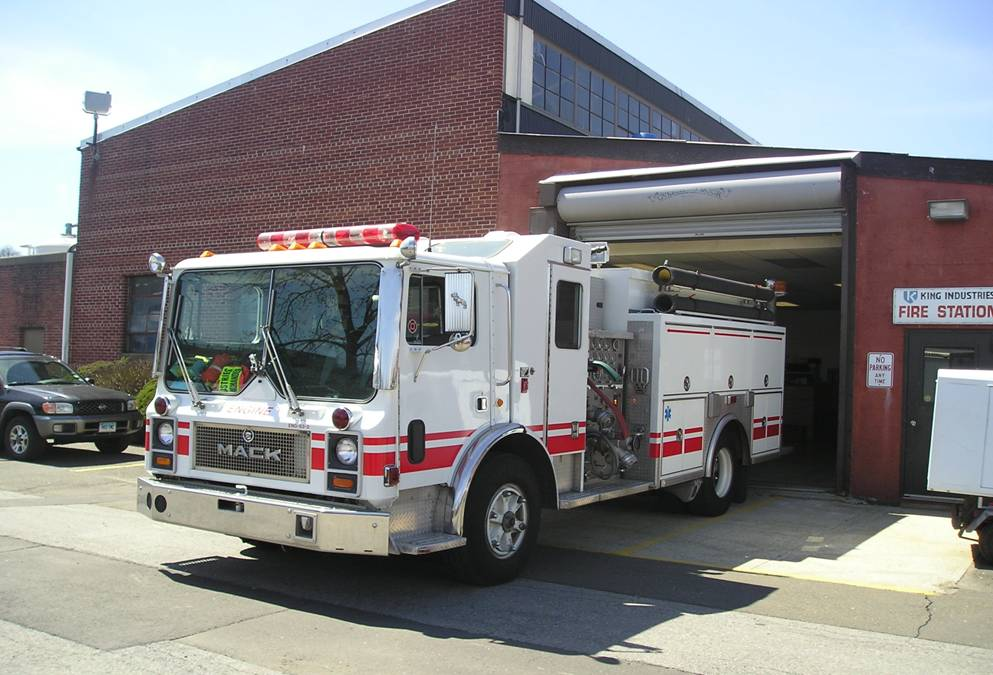
MC

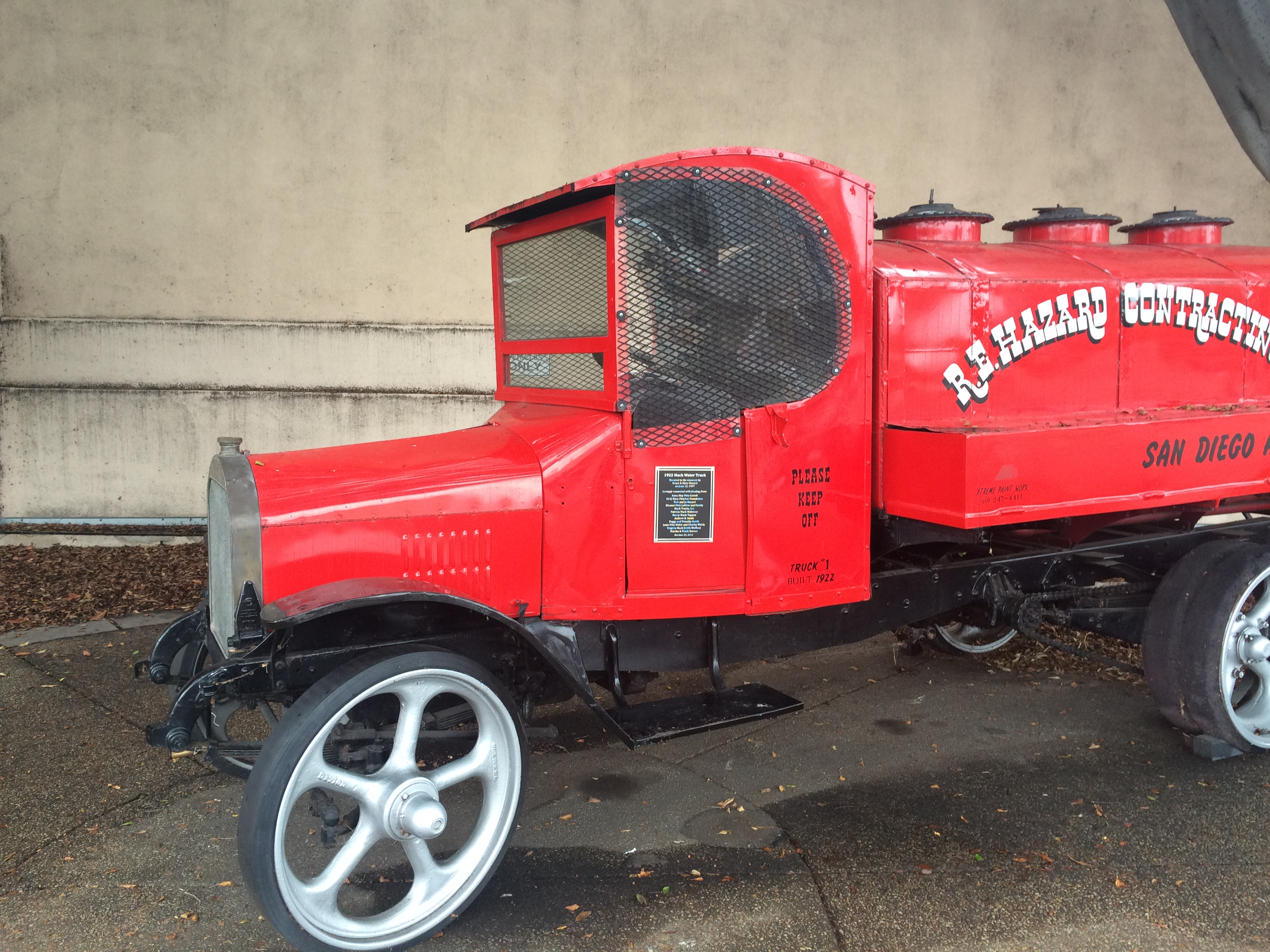
San Diego Automotive Museum 1922 Mack Water Truck

=== Previous models ===
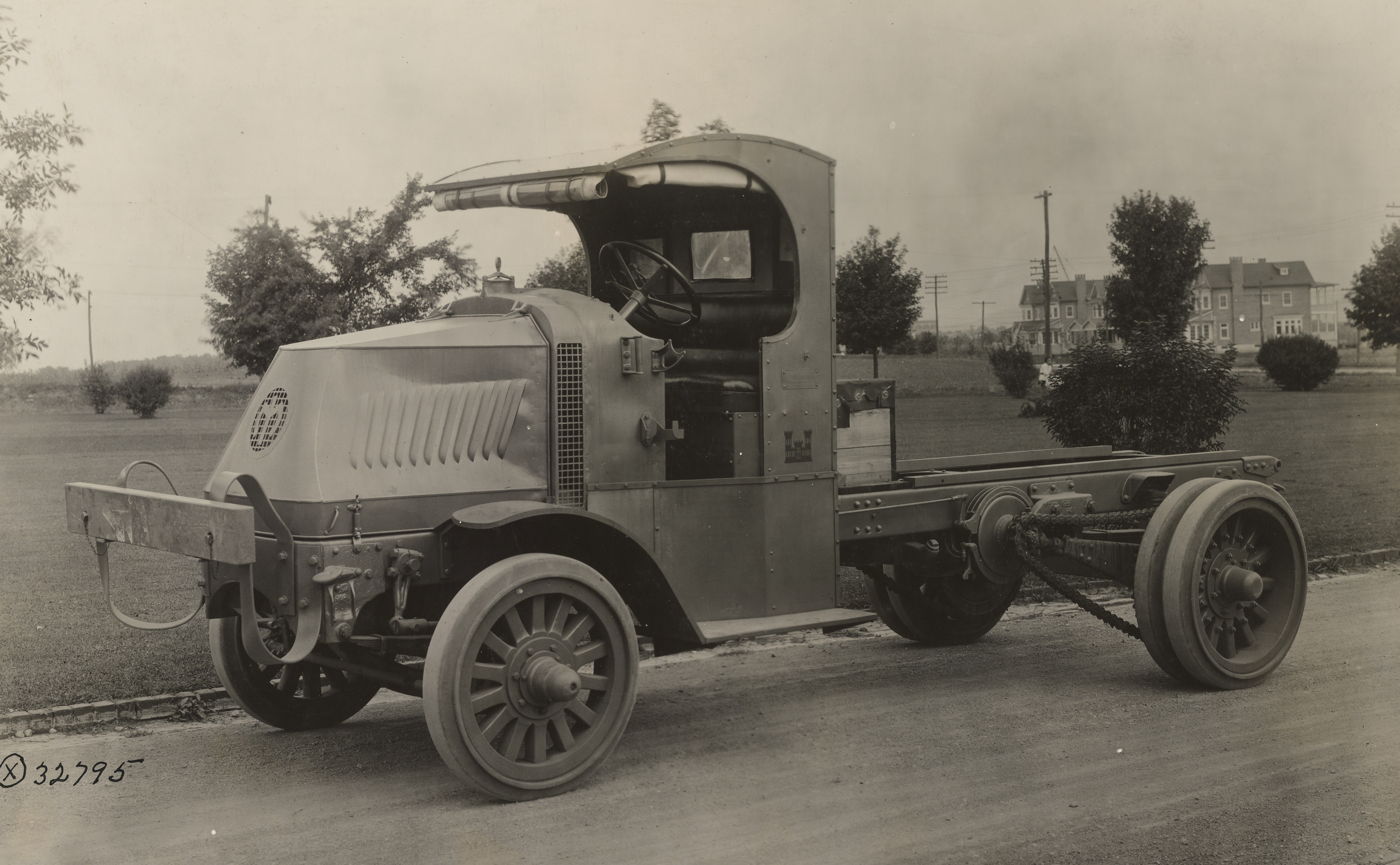
AC series 5 1/2 ton truck, 1918

==== AC ====
The heavy-duty AC, with its well-known tapered hood, was the truck which started the bulldog theme. A 377 cu in (6.2 L) 4 cylinder gasoline engine 4X2 with chain drive, it was strong, reliable, and worked well in rough terrain. Introduced in 1916, there was a great demand because of World War I, over 6000 3 1/2-, 5 1/2-, and 7 1/2-ton trucks were built for the UK and US military. There were also commercial sales from 1916; the AC was well suited for logging and construction work. A larger version, the AP, built between 1926 and 1938, was an off-road haul truck used on Boulder Dam and other large projects. 40,299 ACs had been built when production ended in 1939.

==== N Series ====
The N Series was Mack's first military design, large 6 and 7 1/2-ton 6X6 artillery prime movers. Between its development in the late 1930s and the beginning of production in 1940 US military requirements changed and the truck was not needed. All NMs and most of the larger NOs were exported as foreign aid. After World War II the NO was developed into the successful M 123 semi-tractor.

==== B series ====
The Mack B series models were Mack's primary vehicle from its introduction in 1953 until it was replaced by the R Series in 1966. They ranged in size from the medium duty B20P gas powered 4X2 to the oversized B873SX turbo-diesel 6X6. B Models were commonly used as semi tractors and in the construction industry. They were also used as fire engines and trucks, sometimes with the roof of the cab removed. 127,786 B Models were built.

==== R/RB/RD/RL/RM/RW, U, DM/DMM series ====
Mack started to produce the Mack R series (R, RW, and U models) in 1966 for highway use, and the RD, DM, and all wheel drive RM and DMM models for construction use. The lightweight RL model followed in 1967, the RW Superliner with a large, rectangular hood and grill in 1977, and the setback front axle RB in the 1990s. All these models featured the same cab; the U, DM, and DMM had the cab offset to the left.

In the 1990s, the R, RW, and U series models were discontinued and the RB was introduced, mostly for severe-duty applications. The hood was modified slightly for the model RB. 2004 was the last year for the RD, and 2006 for the RB and DM. The DM was the last model to use this cab style, and was the last model of this family to be produced.

As a replacement for the construction models, Mack started to offer the Granite, Granite Bridge-Formula and Granite Axle-back.

Also this model is serving in the Mexican Army as a Troop and Utility Truck in configuration 6X6 OR 6X4

=== Engines ===
By 1916 Mack was producing 4- and 6-cylinder gasoline engines, and through 2014 continued to offer their own, in the form of three diesel I6s. Engines by other manufacturers were often optional, supplied over the years by Caterpillar, Cummins, Chrysler, Detroit Diesel, Hercules, Scania, and Waukesha.

Mack started making diesels in 1938, in 1957 the END and turbocharged ENDT 673 diesel were introduced. This 672 cu in (11.0 L) I6 engine family was successful, and remained in production for over 30 years.

In the early 1960s, Walter May, executive vice president of product and engineering at Mack Trucks HQ in Allentown, PA., prioritized research and development of a high-torque rise engine. Winton Pelizzoni, chief engineer at the Mack Trucks powertrain facility in Hagerstown, MD., designed an innovative engine based on this concept and then led development of the prototype that went into production. The engine was introduced as an inline six in 1966, as a V8 in 1970, and as the intercooled inline six 300 series in 1973. This was an industry-changing event. The Maxidyne, with an operating range of 1200–2100 R.P.M, and later 1050–1700 R.P.M., allowed a heavy Class 8 truck to be operated with a 5 speed (Maxitorque) transmission. Previously, heavy trucks typically operated between 1800–2100R.P.M. and were equipped with 10 or more gears.

In 2014 Mack offers three engine series, the 11 L MP 7, 13 L MP8, and 16 L MP10, with 325 hp (242 kW) to 605 hp (451 kW) and 1,200 lb⋅ft (1,627 N⋅m) to 2,060 lb⋅ft (2,793 N⋅m).

=== Other products ===
Mack also produced railroad cars and locomotives between 1905 and 1930. The company additionally produced several railbus models.

== Trademark ==
The company's trademark is the bulldog, which can be found on the front of almost all Mack trucks. A gold-plated bulldog indicates the truck came with all Mack drivetrain including the engine, transmission and axles.

Mack trucks earned their nickname during World War I, when the British government purchased the Mack AC for supplying its front lines. Its pugnacious, blunt-nosed hood, tenacious performance, and durability, reminded the soldiers of their country's mascot, the British Bulldog. The logo was first used in 1921 for the AB chain drive models and became the official corporate logo in 1922.

https://commons.wikimedia.org/wiki/File:Mack_Golden_Bulldog_Hood_Ornament.jpg

== Leadership ==
Mack leader	Dates of service
John M. Mack	1900 to 1905 and 1909 to October 17, 1911
Otto Mears	April 29, 1905, to January 9, 1906
Jacob Sulzbach	January 9, 1906, to January 8, 1907
Thomas Rush	January 8, 1907, to December 8, 1908
Charles P. Coleman	October 17, 1911, to June 13, 1913
John Calder	June to October 1913
Vernon Munroe	October 22, 1913, to May 23, 1917
Alfred J. Brosseau	May 15, 1917, to September 24, 1936
Emil C. Fink	January 28, 1937, to January 1, 1943
Charles T. Ruhf	August 5, 1943, to June 6, 1949
Edwin D. Bransome	June 6, 1949, to January 11, 1955
Peter O. Peterson	January 11, 1955, to December 31, 1958
Christian A. Johnson	1958 to 1962 (acting President)
Nicholas Dykstra	July 20, 1961, to September 1, 1962
C. Rhoades McBride	September 7, 1962, to January 6, 1965
Zenon C.R. Hansen	January 7, 1965, to January 28, 1972
Henry J. Nave	January 28, 1972, to January 1, 1976
Alfred W. Pelletier	January 1, 1976, to July 21, 1980
John B. Curcio	July 21, 1980, to 1989
Ralph Reins	1989 to 1990
Elios Pascual	1990 to 1995
Pierre Jocou	March 1, 1995, to November 29, 1996
Michel Gigou	December 1, 1996, to July 1, 2001
Paul Vikner	July 1, 2001, to April 1, 2008
Dennis Slagle	April 1, 2008 to January 1, 2012
Kevin Flaherty	January 1, 2012 to January 1, 2014
Stephen Roy	January 1, 2014 to March 1, 2016
Dennis Slagle	March 1, 2016 to May 31, 2018
Martin Weissburg	June 1, 2018 to October 1, 2023
Stephen Roy	June 1, 2023 to present

== Military models ==
=== World War II ===
Mack built over 35,000 heavy duty military trucks during World War II, most for export under Lend-Lease. None were US Army standard types, all were designed and built exclusively by Mack.

The EH series was a commercial design 5 ton (4,500 kg) (Note: On road load rating.) 4x2 adapted for military service. The EH, EHU (cabover) and semi-tractor models EHT and EHUT were used by the US Army in Europe. Over 2,400 were built in 1942.

The LMSW was a commercial design 10 ton (9,070 kg) 6x4 chassis adapted for military wreckers, most were exported to Great Britain.

The NJU (G-639) series were military design 5 ton (5,450 kg) (Note: Off road load rating) 4x4 semi-tractors used to tow bridging pontoons and equipment. Several other manufactures built standardized models of similar trucks, so only 700 were produced in 1941–1942.

The NM (G-535) and NO (G-532) series were military design 6 ton (5,443 kg) and 7 1/2 ton (6,800 kg) 6x6 artillery prime movers. All NMs and most of the larger NOs were exported as foreign aid. Over 8,400 NMs and 2,000 NOs were built between 1940 and 1944.

The NR series were military design 10 ton (5,440 kg) 6x4 cargo trucks. Intended for British use in North Africa, they had Mack ED diesel engines, making them valuable for long-distance trips. Over 15,000 were built between 1940 and 1944.

=== Post World War II ===
Since World War II, Mack has had limited military production.

The M39 (G-744) series, which includes the M54 cargo truck, were a standardized military design 5 ton (4,540 kg) 6x6 chassis, with many models. Mack developed a competing design, when the M39 was standardized Mack built a relatively small number of M51 dump trucks. In the early 1960s they took part in a short lived program to retrofit some of the series with Mack END 672 engines.

The M123 and M125 (G-792) were standardized military design 10 ton (9,070 kg) 6x6 semi tractors and artillery prime movers. Designed by Mack, using many components from the NO series. Mack built 392 M123s, used with a lowboy trailer to recover and transport tanks, and all 552 M125s, between 1955 and 1957. Later follow-up orders called for 420 M123s and retrofitted 210 more with Cummins engines.

== In popular culture ==
Five 1970s Mack RS700 series trucks and one Cruise Liner COE were used in the motion picture Convoy starring Kris Kristofferson as Martin "Rubber Duck" Penwald and Ali MacGraw as Melissa.

A 1980s video for the Bananarama song "Cruel Summer" prominently features a red Mack truck.

In the film Cars, Mack is Lightning McQueen's transport, an animated 1985 Mack Super-Liner voiced by John Ratzenberger. Ratzenberger's father drove a Mack truck to deliver oil for three decades. On the "Disney/Pixar Road Trip '06", which promoted the film in a four-month tour of forty-one cities, "Mack" is a 2006 CH Rawhide 460-horsepower Mack truck carrying an Eddie Paul customized Trans Am as "Lightning".

In American Truck Simulator, by the Czech Software Studio SCS Software, players can drive the Mack Anthem and the Mack Pinnacle, two of the officially licensed trucks included in the game.

CEO Denny Slagle took part in CBS' Undercover Boss in 2011.

== See also ==
- List of Mack Trucks products
- Buckeye Bulldog
- Volvo
- Freightliner Trucks
- Leader Trucks
- List of historic places in Allentown, Pennsylvania
