= Model B =

Model B may refer to:

== Aircraft ==
- Chu Hummingbird Model B, an experimental helicopter
- Funk Model B, a 1930s two-seat cabin monoplane
- Gee Bee Model B, a sports aircraft
- Wright Model B, an early pusher airplane

== Land vehicles ==
- Allis-Chalmers Model B, a tractor
- Buick Model B, a car
- Cadillac Model B, a car
- Ford Model B (1904), a car
- Ford Model B (1932), a car
- Mack B series, a heavy truck
- Lambretta Model B, a motor scooter

== Other uses ==
- Electro-Spanish Model B, a guitar

== See also ==
- Class B (disambiguation)
- Type B (disambiguation)
