= B class =

B class may refer to:

== Ships ==
- B-class corvette of the Turkish Navy
- B-class destroyer, launched in 1930 for the British Royal Navy
- B-class destroyer (1913), British torpedo boat destroyers
- B-class lifeboat, British lifeboats
- B-class submarine (disambiguation), several types

== Rail transport ==
- B-class Melbourne tram, an Australian tram
- DHR B Class, built for the Darjeeling Himalayan Railway in India
- Metropolitan Railway B Class, a British steam locomotive
- NBR B class, a British steam locomotive
- NZR B class (1874), a steam locomotive of the New Zealand Railways Department
- NZR B class (1899), a steam locomotive of the New Zealand Railways Department
- CIÉ 101 Class, an Irish diesel locomotive
- CIÉ 113 Class, an Irish diesel locomotive
- LCDR B class, a British steam locomotive
- MRWA B class, an Australian steam locomotive
- South Australian Railways B class, an Australian steam locomotive
- Tasmanian Government Railways B class, an Australian steam locomotive
- Victorian Railways B class (1861), an Australian steam locomotive
- Victorian Railways B class (diesel), an Australian diesel locomotive
- WAGR B class, an Australian steam locomotive
- WAGR B class (diesel), an Australian diesel locomotive

== Other uses ==
- B-class blimp, airships operated by the United States Navy
- B-segment, a European vehicle size class
- Mercedes-Benz B-Class, a subcompact executive car
- WikiProject#WikiProjects and assessments of article importance and quality, on Wikipedia

== See also ==
- Class B (disambiguation)
- B type (disambiguation)
- B series (disambiguation)
