= Class B =

Class B may refer to:

- Class B (baseball), a defunct class in minor league baseball in North America
- Class B (classification), a Paralympic wheelchair fencing classification
- Class B drug, in British law
- Class B share, a “class” of common or preferred stock
- Class B star
- Barry Railway Class B, a British steam locomotive
- LNWR Class B, a British steam locomotive
- Class B office space, a step below Class A office space
- An Army Service Uniform
- An airspace class defined by the ICAO
- A power amplifier class
- A class of broadcast station in North America
- An electronic device conforming to FCC rule Title 47 CFR Part 15, Subpart B, Class B
- An explosives category for professional fireworks; see Fireworks policy in the United States
- A network in the Internet classful network system
- A pathogen treatment and pollutant criterion, an EPA reuse category in biosolids
- A recreational vehicle, or campervan
- A class of boat in the European Union

== See also ==
- B-class (disambiguation)
- Class A (disambiguation)
- Class C (disambiguation)
- Type B (disambiguation)
