= Coolpower =

Mechanism for cooling truck engines

A coolpower setup in a truck engine can use an intercooler mounted on top of the engine with a tip turbine fan, or an air-to-air cooler in front of the radiator. In either case, the goal is to cool the hot, compressed air going from the turbocharger into the engine. With the tip turbine, a small quantity of compressed air is bled off to spin a small fan that draws air through the intercooler tubes. In some later models, a water cooler was also used, in addition to the tip turbine setup. Mack called the tip-turbine setup an intercooler and used a pyrometer to alert the operator if the exhaust gas exceeded a limit. The tip turbine setup was compact and the shorter plumbing runs allowed boost to build faster. Later models with the front mounted air-to-air cooler required a larger turbocharger to fill the tubes faster but with the benefit of additional power. Modern trucks use the air-to-air cooler in nearly all cases.

Large Mack trucks from the 1970s such as the Mack R-600 used coolpower systems. Some coolpower systems used vertical bar shutters that could be opened and shut in front of the radiator to maintain proper operating temperature.

The Mack Cruise Liner model built in 1984, a 6X4 Primemover, used a 320 horsepower (240 kW) coolpower engine.

== Other meanings ==
=== Air intakes on turbochargers ===
The term is also used to refer to “Cool Power” air intake systems for turbocharged engines. These systems provide cooler air to the turbocharger and engine, instead of the potentially too-warm air from the engine compartment. Cooler intake air is denser, which means that the engine can produce the same power with less fuel. Cooler air also gives the engine more power for applications such as towing heavy loads up driving up steep grades during the summer. Cooler air drawn into the engine compartment lowers the temperature under the hood, which allows plastic, rubber and electronic parts to last longer. Lastly, cool power systems will supports larger turbochargers by creating additional air flow to the engine.

=== Hydraulic drive system ===
The US military uses the expression "cool power" to describe its "regenerative drive unit", a "light-weight hybrid hydraulic drive system" that weighs 330 pounds. The "system can generate nearly 1,000 foot-pounds force (1,400 N⋅m) of torque and power equivalent to a 340 horsepower (250 kW) engine." It operates by storing "energy normally lost as heat during the braking process in a high-pressure oil tank called an accumulator." The system use two hydraulic-fluid storage devices controlled by a central processor. One of the reasons the US military is interested in the system is that its "cool" power allows vehicles to move "... without generating a "thermal footprint" that can be identified by enemy tracking systems."
