= Barry Railway Class B =

Class of 25 two-cylinder 0-6-2T locomotives

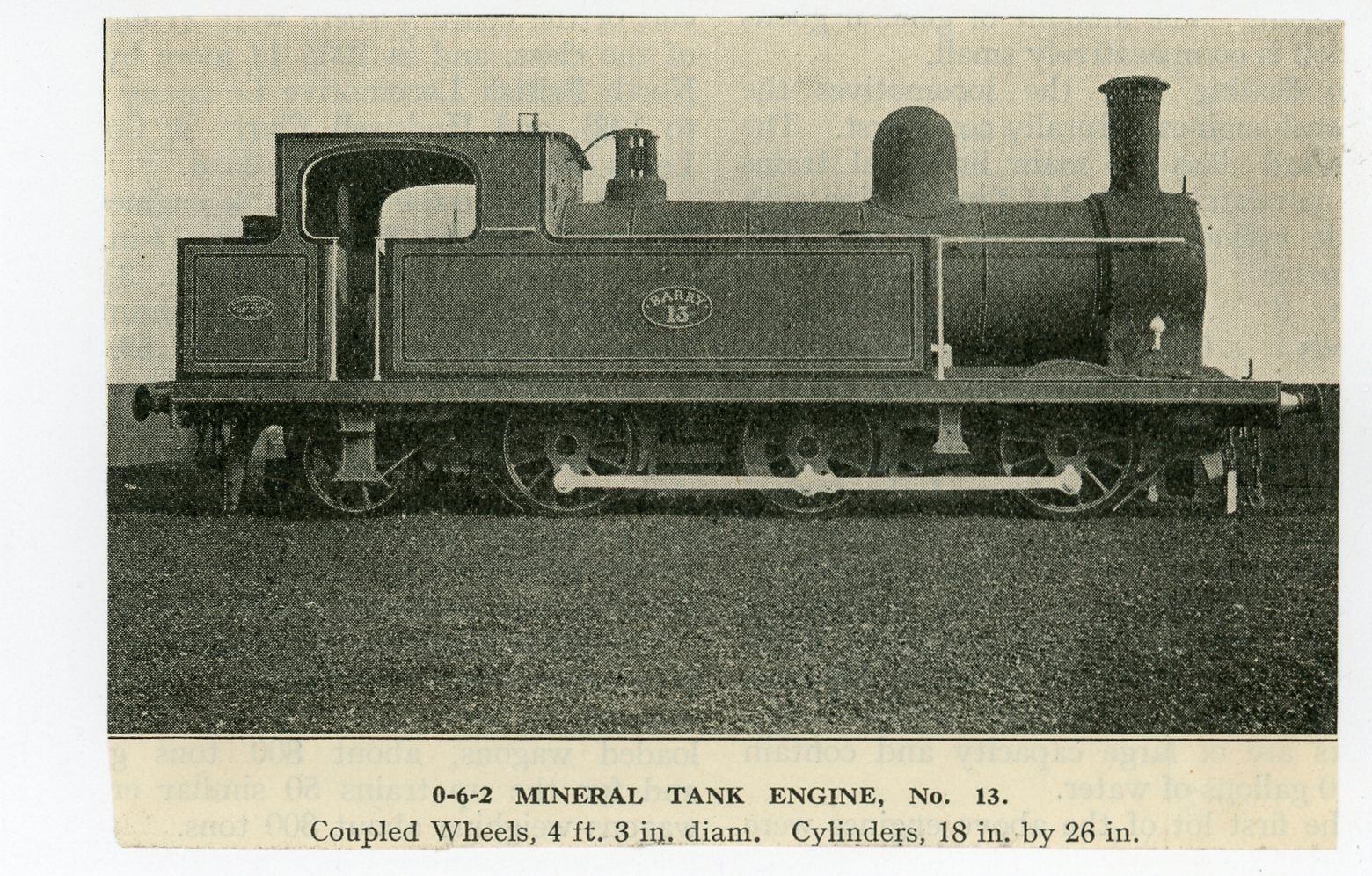
- Barry Railway Class B 0-6-2T No. 13
Type and origin
- Power type: Steam
- Builder: Sharp, Stewart & Co.
- Build date: 1888–1890
- Total produced: 25
Specifications
- Configuration
  - Whyte: 0-6-2T
  - UIC: C1 n2t
- Gauge: 4 ft 8 1/2 in (1,435 mm) standard gauge
- Driver dia.: 4 ft 3 in (1.295 m)
- Trailing dia.: 3 ft 6 in (1.067 m)
- Loco weight: 51 long tons 2 cwt (114,500 lb or 51.9 t) (57.2 short tons)
- Fuel type: Coal
- Boiler pressure: 150 psi (1.03 MPa)
- Cylinders: Two
- Cylinder size: 18 in × 26 in (457 mm × 660 mm)
- Valve gear: Stephenson
Performance figures
- Tractive effort: 21,230 lbf (94.44 kN)
Career
- Operators: BR » GWR » BR
- Withdrawn: 1922–1949
- Disposition: All scrapped

Barry Railway Class B were 0-6-2T steam tank locomotives of the Barry Railway in South Wales. They were designed and built by Sharp Stewart and were virtually identical to the Class A that preceded it, with the addition of a trailing truck. The first three, Nos. 6, 7 and 8 were introduced in December 1888 and the remainder of the batch (Nos. 9 to 20) were delivered between January and May 1889. No. 7 was vacuum fitted and thus was able to haul passenger services as the relief engine for No. 5, a Class A.

The main purpose of the engine was to haul mineral trains to Cadoxton from Hafod Sidings in Rhondda and from Treforest Junction as well as from Coity Junction near Bridgend and Peterstone Junction. The second batch (Nos. 23 to 32) were delivered between December 1889 and February 1890 and differed from the first batch in having a Type 2 boiler. This led to them initially being called Class B1s.

The locomotives passed to the Great Western Railway in 1922. Only four survived into British Railways ownership in 1948, numbers 198, 212, 213, and 231. None were preserved.

== Numbering ==
Year	Quantity	Manufacturer	Serial numbers	Barry Numbers	GWR Numbers	Notes
1888–89	15	Sharp, Stewart & Co.	3454–3468	6–20	198–201, 203, 204, 206–214	
1889–90	10	Sharp, Stewart & Co.	3571–3580	23–32	223–232	
