= B type =

B type or Type B may refer to:

== Astronomy ==
- B-type asteroid, a type of relatively uncommon type of carbonaceous asteroid
- B-type giant, a type of blue giant star
- B-type star, a type of star

== Biology ==
- B type blood, a type in the ABO blood group system
- B type inclusion, a type of inclusions in cells infected with poxvirus
- B-type natriuretic peptide, a type of brain natriuretic peptides
- B type proanthocyanidin, a specific type of flavanoids
- Type B evaluation of uncertainty, an uncertainty in measurement inferred from scientific judgement or other information concerning the possible values of the quantity
- Type B personality, a type in the Type A and Type B personality theory

== Others ==
- B-type warbird, a type of Romulan starship
- Type B videotape, an open-reel videotape format
- Type B plug (see also NEMA connector)
- Curtiss-built B-type, a type of B class blimp
- LGOC B-type, a model of double-decker bus that was introduced in London on 1910
- Mann Egerton Type B, a 1910s British maritime patrol aircraft
- Toyota Type B engine, an internal combustion engine
- Vauxhall B-Type, a large car from 1911 to 1914
- Type B ship, a U.S. designation for World War II barges
- B type Adelaide tram

== See also ==
- B class (disambiguation)
- Class B (disambiguation)
