= B series =

B series may refer to:

== Transportation ==
- BMC B-series engine, a type of combustion engine
- Cummins B Series engine, a family of diesel engines
- Chevrolet/GMC B series, a bus
- Transperth B-series train, a type of electric multiple unit used by Transperth Trains in Perth, Western Australia

== Other uses ==
- A series and B series, a term in philosophy introduced by John McTaggart
- Butcher series, a type of power series in numerical analysis introduced by John C. Butcher
- Series B, venture capital funding round
- Series B banknotes, Irish banknotes

== See also ==
- B class (disambiguation)
