= Mack Granite =

Heavy-duty truck series

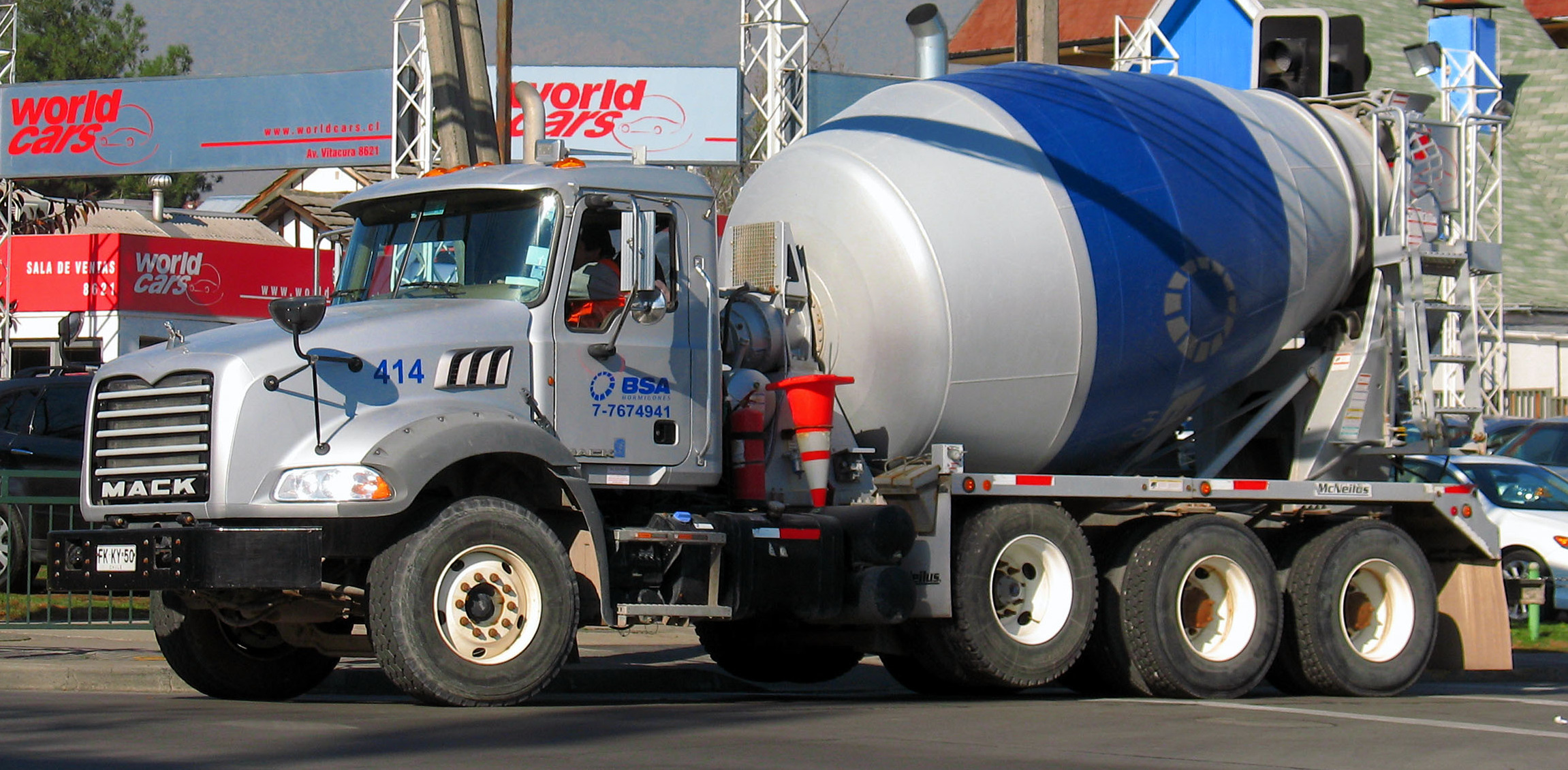
- Concrete mixer

Overview
- Manufacturer: Mack Trucks
- Production: 2001-Present
- Assembly: United States: Macungie, Pennsylvania (Lehigh Valley Operations)

Body and chassis
- Class: Class 8
- Body style: Conventional day-cab Sleeper available
- Layout: 4x2, 4x4, 6x4, 6x6, 8x4, 8x6

Powertrain
- Engine: Mack MP8, Mack MP7; Mack MP13, Cummins ISL9, Cummins L9
- Transmission: Mack and Eaton-Fuller 8-19 speed Allison 5-7 speed auto.

Dimensions
- Wheelbase: 149–304 in (3,800–7,700 mm)
- Width: 96 in (2,400 mm)
- Curb weight: 92,000 lb (42,000 kg); Gross Vehicle Weight (GVW)

Chronology
- Predecessor: R Model and DM series

The Mack Granite is a series of heavy duty (Class 8) and severe service trucks built by Mack Trucks. It has a long, low-profile hood and a high-visibility cab. Designed as straight trucks for local construction, waste removal, and other vocational jobs, it is also available as a semi-tractor. Introduced in 2001, it remains in production as of today. A new generation was introduced in 2026.

== Design ==
The Granite is a long-hood conventional. It measures 117.5 from the bumper to the back of the cab. Designed for local use it usually has a day-cab but a 36" integral sleeper is available. Commonly a 6x4 (3 axles, 2 powered) there are packages from 4x2 (2 axles, 1 powered) to 8x6 (4 axles, 3 powered) and can be fitted with driven front, tandem-steer, lift, and extended trailing axles. Total loaded weight can be up to 92,000 pounds (42,000 kg) on four axles.

Advanced electronics are used for engine, chassis, and body controls, as well as maintenance. All trucks have ABS.

Mack builds their own major components (engines, transmissions, axles, and suspensions) and the Granite has specific packages for different applications. Most vendor components are also available but engine choice is limited.

== Engines ==
The Granite is available with two Mack diesels, a Cummins diesel, and a Cummins Westport natural gas engine. Between 2001 and 2005 an earlier generation Mack diesel was used.

The Mack MP7 is the base engine in the Granite. It is a 659 cubic inches (10.8 L) overhead cam turbocharged inline six-cylinder diesel engine. It develops 325 to 425 horsepower (242 to 317 kW) and 1,260 to 1,560 pound force-feet (1,710 to 2,120 N⋅m) of torque. It was introduced in December 2006.

The Mack MP8 is the largest engine in the Granite. It is a 783 cubic inches (12.8 L) overhead cam turbocharged inline six-cylinder engine. It develops 415 to 505 horsepower (309 to 377 kW) and 1,460 to 1,867 pound force-feet (1,979 to 2,531 N⋅m) of torque. It has been in production since 2007.

The Cummins ISL9 used in the Granite MHD when lower overall weight is more important than power. It is a 543 cubic inches (8.9 L) turbocharged inline six-cylinder engine. It develops 350 horsepower (260 kW) and 1,115 pound force-feet (1,512 N⋅m) of torque.

The Cummins Westport L9N is a 543 cubic inches (8.9 L) turbocharged inline six-cylinder natural gas engine. It develops 329 horsepower (245 kW) and 1,000 pound force-feet (1,400 N⋅m) of torque.

The Mack E7 AMI series was used in the Granite between 2001 and 2005. It is a 728 cubic inches (11.9 L) turbocharged inline six-cylinder engine. It develops 300 to 370 horsepower (220 to 280 kW) and 1,200 to 1,480 pound force-feet (1,630 to 2,010 N⋅m) of torque.

== Transmissions ==
Both Mack and Eaton-Fuller have manual and automated shifting models. Manual transmissions have five or six main gears, extra ratios are made with different combinations of ranges. Allison transmissions are fully automatic.

Mack mDRIVE automated manual is the Granite's base transmission. It has no clutch pedal and shifts itself on demand. The driver can override it but it is normally driven in "D". It can have 12, 13, or 14-speeds. Other Mack manual transmissions have from 8- to 18-speeds.

Eaton-Fuller UltraShift automated shifting systems are available on all of their transmissions from 9- to 18-speeds.

Allison RDS series 5- or 6-speed transmissions are available. The RDS is a fully automatic planetary gear transmission with a lock-up torque converter.

== Frame ==
A ladder frame with beam axles is used. Normally there is a single undriven front axle on semi-elliptical leaf springs, but driven and tandem steer (popular in Canada) axles are available. The base rear suspension is a Mack tandem (two powered axles). Granites are also available with single and tridem (three driven) axles, different axle/suspension combination types. Lift axles can be installed by either Mack or bodybuilders. Up to three axles can be driven. Wheelbases are from 149 to 304 inches (380 to 770 cm)

A set-forward or set-back front axle is offered. A set forward axle, with the tires immediately behind a straight bumper, is used when overall length is limited or when wheelbase has to be as long as possible for bridge-formula laws. Set back axles, where the hood extends in front of the axle, are used when maneuverability is more important than length or weight distribution.

In 2020 Mack introduced the Command Steer system. An additional on-demand electric power steering pump is operated electronically. This allows easier steering, will help dampen steering feedback, steady driving, and can compensate for side-winds, uneven pavement, and braking on different surfaces. A very light feel and automatic return-to-center feature are useful off-road, at slow speed, and in backing.

Dana-Spicer and Meritor supply air brakes, driveshafts, and other components.

== Axles and suspensions ==
Front axles are available from 12,000 to 23,000 pounds (5,400 to 10,400 kg), Dana-Spicer and Meritor driven axles up to 23,000 pounds (10,000 kg) are also available. Multi-leaf leaf springs are base, tapered leaves are optional.

Mack powered axles have the drive carrier on top of the housing. This lets the driveshafts be in line from the transmission to and between the axles at a higher level above the ground. With the higher level above the ground the driveshafts and u-joints are less prone to dirt and damage, important in on/off road construction.

Other powered axles are available from Dana-Spicer and Meritor. These have front mounted carriers and in tandems the two axle housings are different.

Single rear axles rated at 23,000 pounds (10,000 kg) are available from Mack and Meritor.

The Camelback tandem is the base rear suspension. The Camelback has multiple leaves that rock above the bogey pivot then curve down and under the axles. It is strong in on/off-road service. It is available in ratings of 38,000, 44,000, 52,000, and 65,000 pounds (17,000, 20,000, 24,000, and 29,000 kg).

The mRIDE tandem has tapered leaves that rock above the bogey pivot then go out and above the axles. Struts go from the bottom of the bogey pivot out and under the axle. They have more wheel travel and ground clearance than the camelback. They are rated at 40,000, 46,000, and 52,000 pounds (18,000, 21,000, and 24,000 kg).

The Twin Y air suspension has trailing arms that fork to the rear and attach to both the top and bottom of the axle. There is an air bag behind the axle on each side and each axle is sprung individually. They are rated at 40,000 pounds (18,000 kg).

Walking beams have low bogie pivots with a balance beam going out and under the axles. Any suspension is above the bogey pivot. They can have leaf springs, rubber load cushions, air bags, or be solidly mounted. Walking beams are very stable at low speeds and when stopped. Mack and Hendrickson models are available.

Vendor tandems from Chalmers, Hendrickson, Meritor, and RAYCO are rated at up to 46,000 pounds (21,000 kg).

Meritor tridems (three powered axles) rated at 69,000 pounds (31,000 kg) are needed for maximum weight trucks regardless of any other extra axles.

== Applications ==
Mack has standard packages for dump, concrete mixer, roll-off(hooklift), and rear loader bodies, as well as semi-tractor. Other packages can be special ordered.

=== Construction ===
The Granite, with its extra heavy-duty chassis, high ground clearance, and high-visibility cab, was designed to be operated on construction" job sites".

Dump trucks are the first standard packages. Typically 6x4 (three axles, two driven) lift axles are available. Body builders can add lift axles and extended trailing axles for higher weights.

Concrete mixers are operated on/off-road locally at high weights. Available driven front axles are often used on mixers. Mixers often can benefit from a set forward front axle and extended trailing axle for increased bridge formula weights.

Other types like flatbeds, including those that self-unload by dumping or with their own crane, Volumetric concrete mixers, and cranes can use the strong chassis.

=== Refuse ===
Refuse is largely on-road use and doesn't need as much power as off-road use. Mack suggests that the Granite MHD with the lighter and less-powerful Cummins ISL9 engines be used.

Roll-off container trucks have a container that is raised in the front and slides off the back of the truck onto the ground. When a loaded box is carried it can be unloaded like a dump truck. They commonly haul construction debris but refuse containers are also left at commercial sites.

Rear-loading compactor bodies have a large hopper on the rear end. Typically a rear crew can load loose material, bins with assist, oversize pieces, and small containers. They are used for residential and light commercial pickup.

=== Semi-tractor ===
There are semi-tractor packages but the Granite was designed primarily as a straight truck.

=== Snow plowing ===
In the northern United States, winter service vehicles provide severe service that the Granite is suited for. The first snowplow model became available mid-2003 and featured a heated windshield and mirrors (and Mack's "Visibility" doors with peep windows), while the air cleaner was placed inside the hood to protect it from ice and snow. The plow/hitch carrier formed an extension of the front frame rails and was constructed from high-strength steel. While the Granite has high ground clearances as standard, Mack offers an increased frame height option since the introduction of the axle-forward snowplow version in March 2018, providing even more clearance for under-truck blades. Reinforced front frame rail extensions are also available; additional cold-weather options include heated side windows, mirrors, and various mechanical components.

=== Other uses ===
The Granite can also be built to custom designs for most local heavy-duty applications. Vocational, utility, heavy delivery, any application that needs a strong chassis.

== Gallery ==
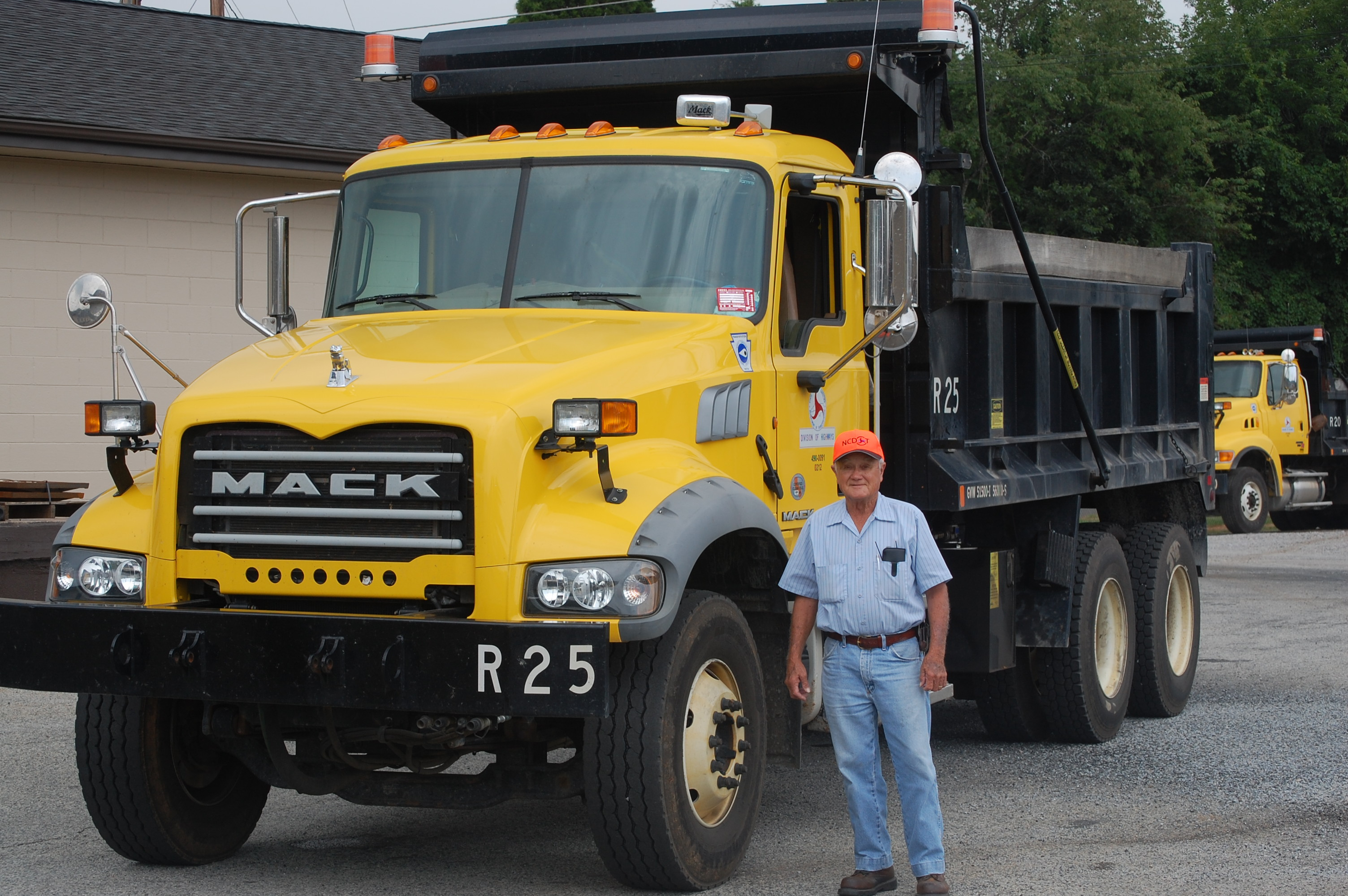
Dump truck, fitted for snow plow

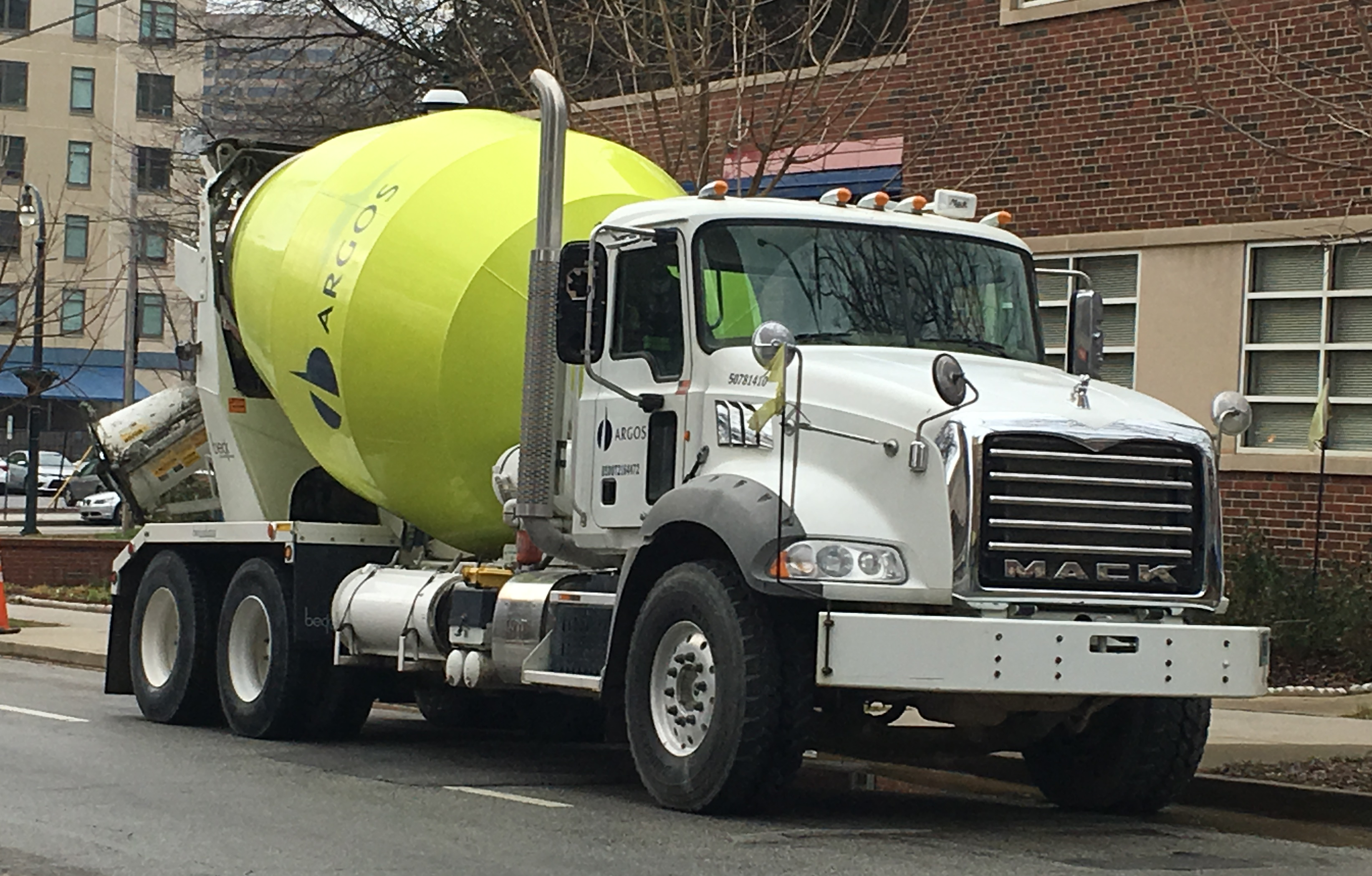
Concrete mixer

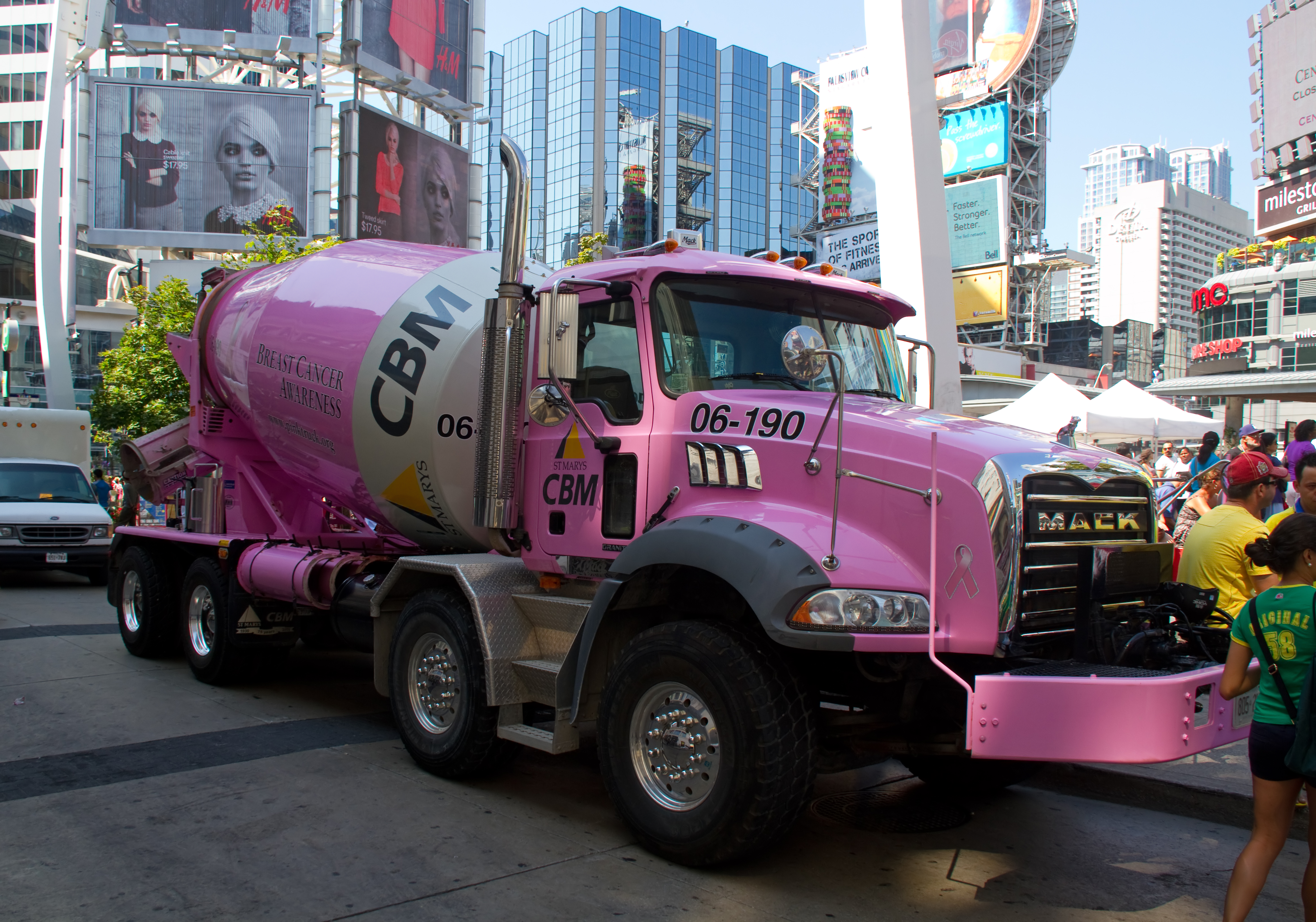
Concrete mixer with tandem steer

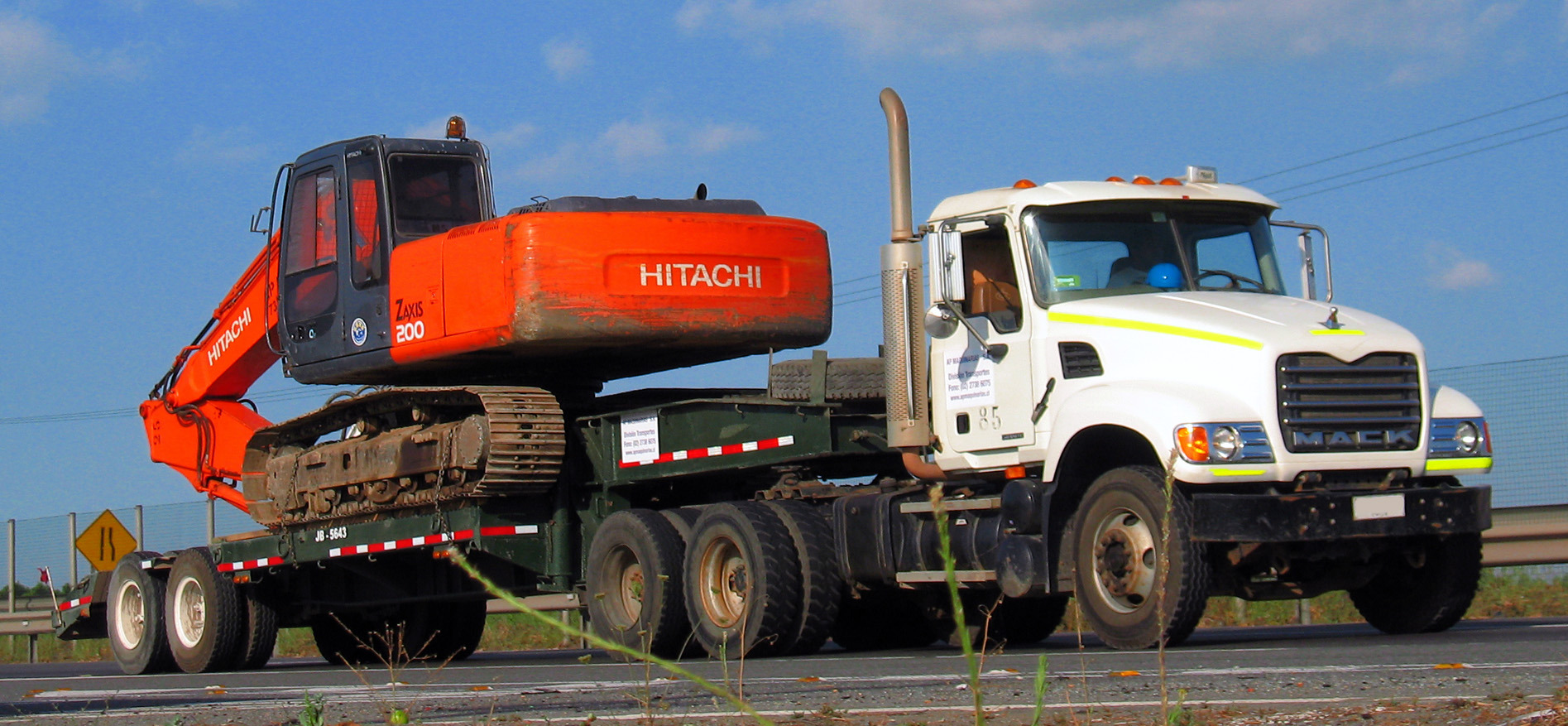
Semi-tractor with drop-deck trailer

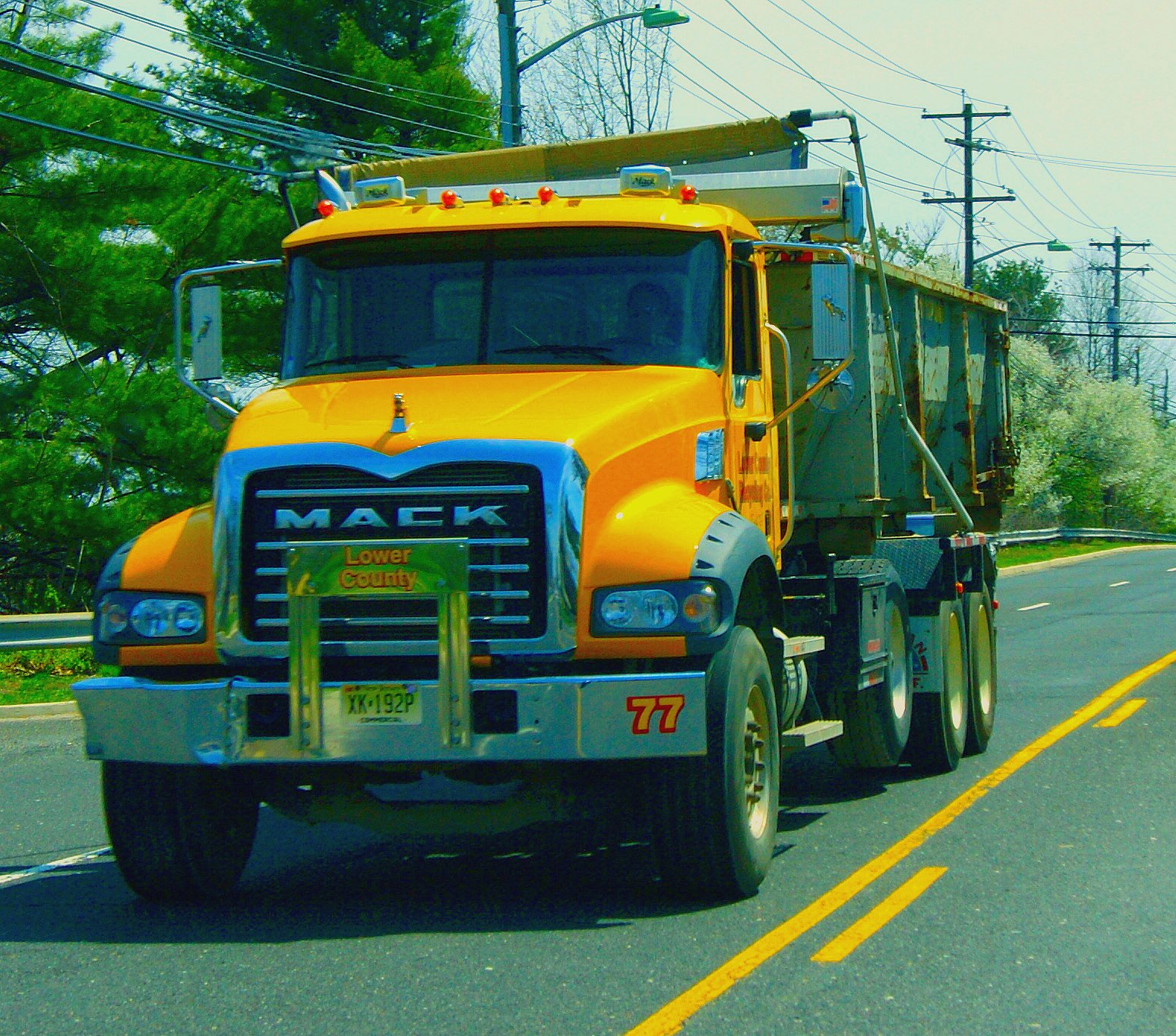
Roll-off container with "pusher" lift axle

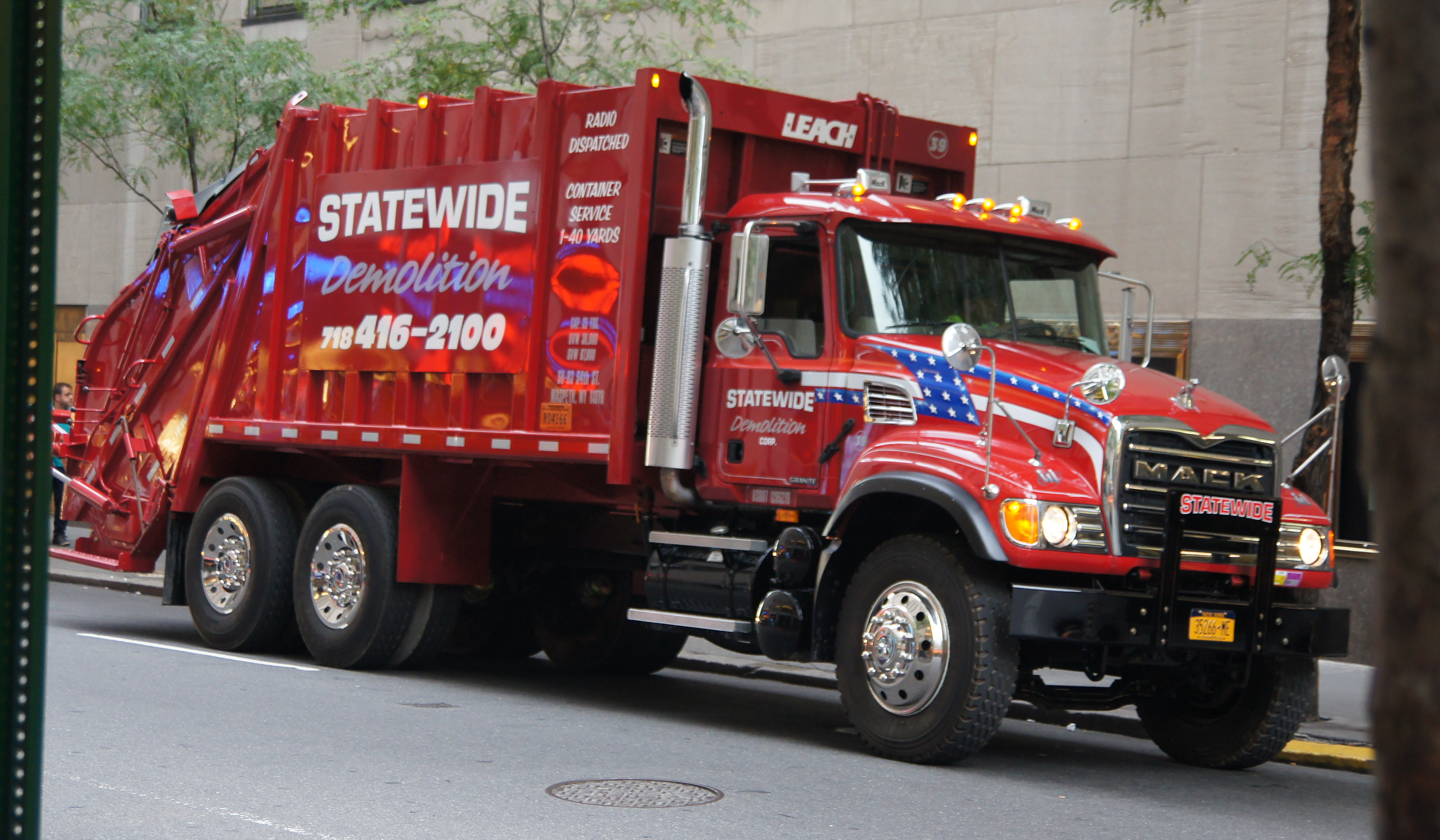
Rear-loader refuse compactor

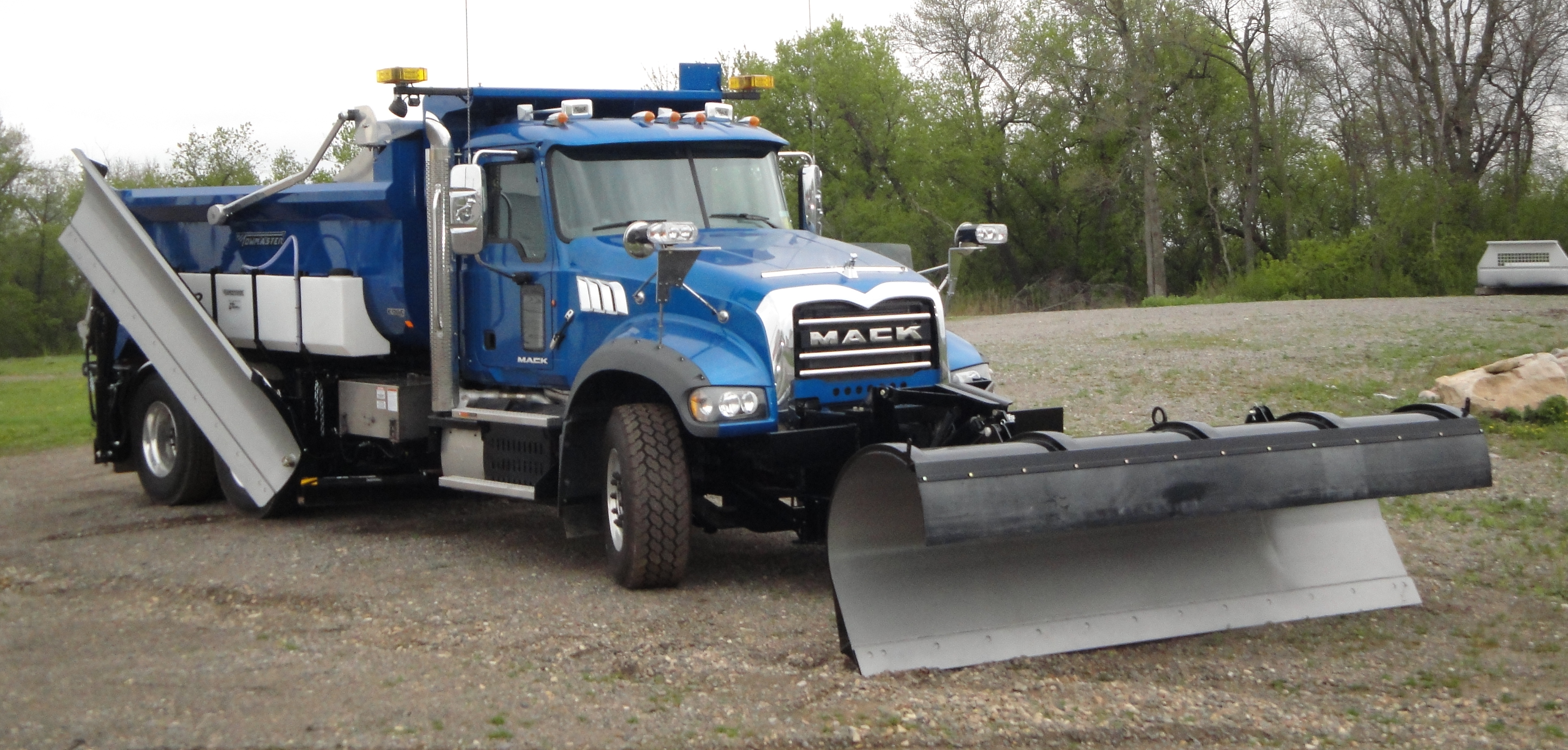
Axle Forward snow plow with wing blade

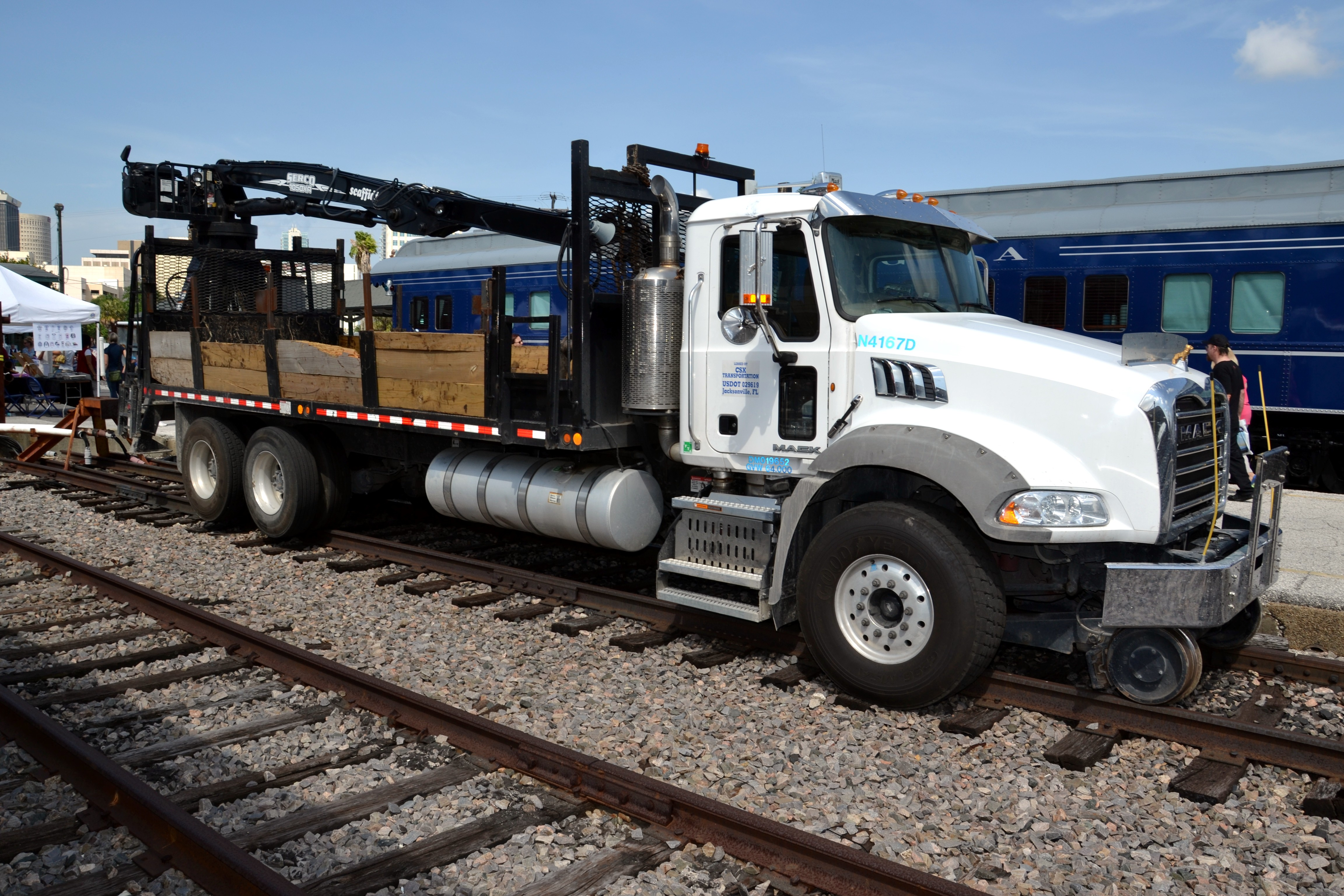
Road-railer with rear-mounted boom
