= Barry Railway Class A =

Class of two-cylinder 0-6-0T locomotives

Type and origin
- Power type: Steam
- Designer: John Wolfe Barry
- Builder: Sharp Stewart
- Build date: 1888
- Total produced: 5
Specifications
- Configuration
  - Whyte: 0-6-0T
  - UIC: C
- Gauge: 4 ft 8 1/2 in (1,435 mm) standard gauge
- Driver dia.: 4 ft 3 in (1.295 m)
- Wheelbase: 14 ft 5 in (4.394 m)
- Loco weight: 45 long tons 6 cwt (101,500 lb or 46 t) (50.7 short tons)
- Fuel type: Coal
- Boiler pressure: 160 psi (1.10 MPa)
- Cylinders: Two inside
- Cylinder size: 18 in × 26 in 457 mm × 660 mm
Performance figures
- Tractive effort: 21,060 lbf (93.68 kN)
Career
- Operators: BR → GWR
- Delivered: 1888
- Withdrawn: 1926–1932
- Disposition: All scrapped

Barry Railway Class A were the first steam tank engines to be built for the Barry Railway in South Wales and had an 0-6-0T wheel arrangement. They were designed by John Wolfe Barry and built by Sharp Stewart.

== Traffic duties ==
The locomotive was primarily intended for heavy shunting duties at Barry Docks and Nos. 1-4 were delivered to Barry for that purpose. One locomotive, No. 5 was the first to be delivered to Treforest Junction where it hauled the Engineer's Saloon at the northern end of the line; the through line to the docks not yet being completed. To perform this duty, No. 5 was fitted with a vacuum injector and train pipes. Because of this, No. 5 was used to pull the first passenger train between Barry Docks and Cogan when the line opened on 20 December 1888. The following year the Class C locomotives arrived and were specifically designed for passenger traffic, at which point the vacuum brake fittings were removed and No. 5 was sent to work with the other 4 locomotives of the class in the docks.

== Withdrawal ==
All five locomotives passed to the Great Western Railway in 1922. No. 1 (GWR 699) was withdrawn in April 1931 and sold to Coltness Iron Co Ltd in June 1932; it was cut up on site in March 1962. No. 2 (GWR 700) was withdrawn in October 1926 and sold to Guest, Keen Nettlefolds at Dowlais Steelworks in October 1927; it was scrapped in August 1950. No. 4 (GWR 703) was withdrawn in May 1932 and sold to Ocean Coal Co Ltd at Lady Windsor Colliery in Ynysybwl; it was scrapped in 1956. No. 3 (GWR 702) was withdrawn in April 1931 and placed on the sales list though never sold. No. 5 (GWR 706) was withdrawn in November 1930 but not offered for sale. None has been preserved.

== Numbering ==
Year	Quantity	Manufacturer	Serial numbers	Barry Numbers	GWR Numbers	Notes
1888	5	Sharp Stewart	3449–3553	1–5	699–700, 702–703, 706	
