= Class B (classification) =

Paralympic wheelchair fencing classification

Class B is a Paralympic wheelchair fencing classification.

== Sport ==
This is a Paralympic wheelchair fencing classification. In 2000, BBC Sport defined this classification as "class B those with poor balance and recovery but full use of one or both upper limbs" In 2008, BBC Sport defined this classification was "B: Athletes with poor balance and recovery, but full use of one or both upper limbs. "

== Becoming classified ==
Classification is handled by International Wheelchair and Amputee Sports Federation.

== At the Paralympic Games ==
For the 2016 Summer Paralympics in Rio, the International Paralympic Committee had a zero classification at the Games policy. This policy was put into place in 2014, with the goal of avoiding last minute changes in classes that would negatively impact athlete training preparations. All competitors needed to be internationally classified with their classification status confirmed prior to the Games, with exceptions to this policy being dealt with on a case-by-case basis.
