= Mack R series =

Line of Class 8 heavy-duty trucks

Mack R Model
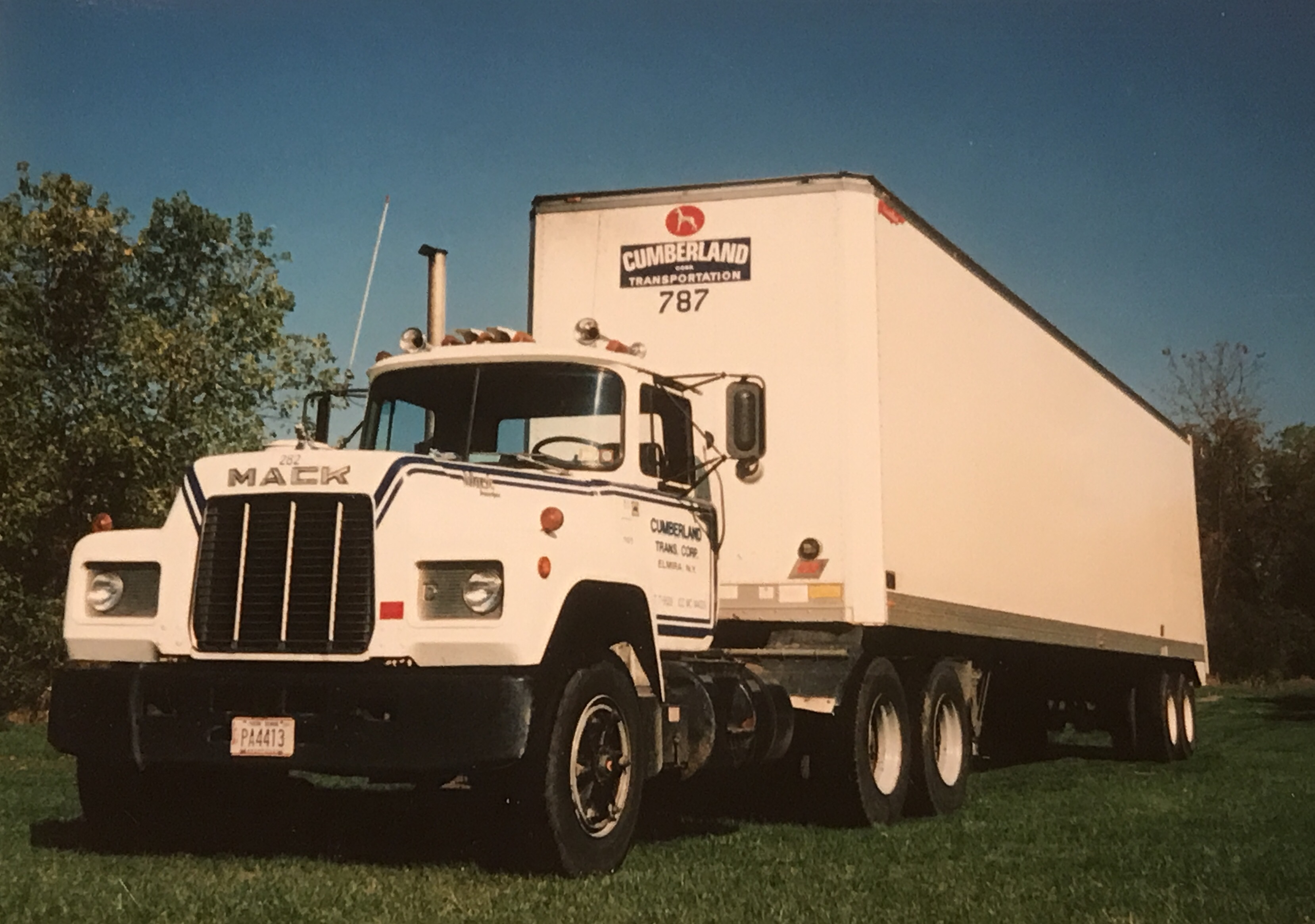

Overview
- Manufacturer: Mack Trucks
- Model years: 1966–2005
- Assembly: Allentown, Pennsylvania; Hayward, California; Iran, Tehran Saipa Diesel (was known as Iran Kaveh)

Body and chassis
- Class: Class 8 truck
- Body style: Truck (bonneted cab)
- Layout: 4x2, 4x4, 6x4, 6x6, 8x6
- Related: Mack U Series; Mack DM Series; Mack Super-Liner

Powertrain
- Engine: 200–440 hp (150–330 kW) turbo-diesel
- Transmission: Mack / Fuller (manual); Allison (automatic)

Chronology
- Predecessor: Mack B Model
- Successor: Mack Granite; Mack Pinnacle

The Mack R series (also known as the Mack Model R) is a series of trucks that was manufactured by Mack Trucks from 1966 to 2005. The successor of the Mack B series, the R was a heavy-duty truck (Class 8) with a conventional (bonneted) cab configuration. With the exception of the Kenworth W900, the Mack R is the longest-produced commercial truck in history.

As with its predecessor, the R Model was offered in a wide variety of configurations for a comprehensive array of vocational and transportation applications. In addition, multiple Mack truck lines have shared components with the R, including the SuperLiner and CH/CL conventionals and the F, WR, and MH cabover trucks. Though not the first truck to adopt a forward-tilting hood, the Mack R introduced several innovations, including an air-ride cab, an integral engine compression brake, and a drivetrain that reduced the need for an auxiliary transmission.

The R Model was produced by Mack in Allentown, Pennsylvania (Lower Macungie Township, Pennsylvania after 1975); several versions (including the SuperLiner) were produced in Hayward, California until Mack closed its assembly facility there in 1980. The series was also produced locally by Mack Australia and in Iran (the latter, license-built, prior to 1979). During the 1990s, Mack began to phase out highway variants of the R in favor of the updated CH/CL, with severe-duty/construction variants lasting through 2005, with the Mack Granite series for those applications.

== Development ==
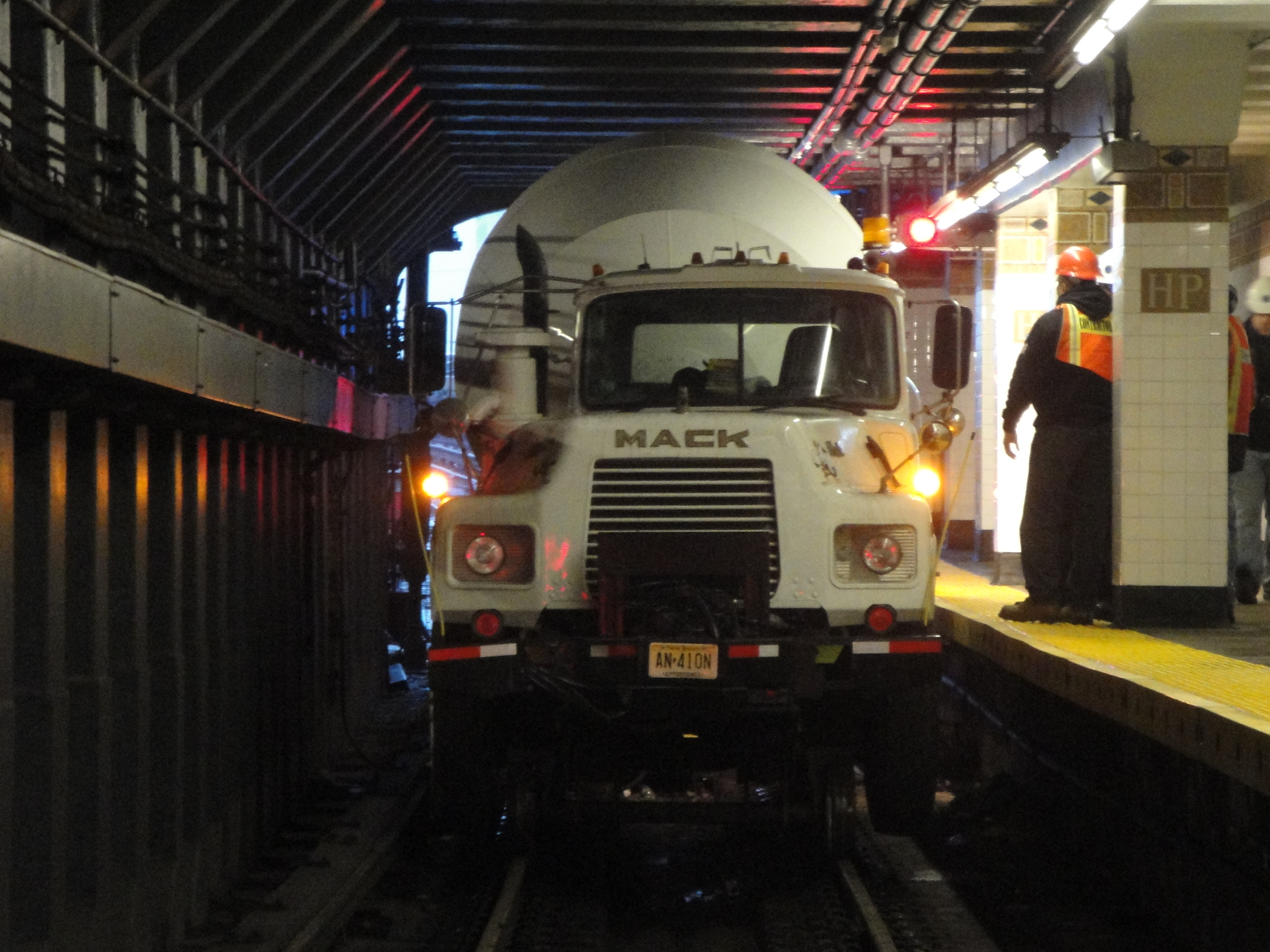
DM Mixer on subway tracks (note offset cab)

The B series trucks had a successful production from 1953 until 1966, but they were due for update for driver comfort and safety. Introduced in 1965, the R series production overlapped with the B series to ease the transition for customers. Of the changes between series, the most significant was the introduction of the new cab. While maintaining the same width as the B series, the interior height was higher and the windshield was almost vertical, reminiscent of the L series trucks. The driver's seat was height-adjustable, and there was increased usage of sound-deadening materials.

While the B had a more conventional hood and fenders that limited access to the engine bay, the R had a one-piece fiberglass hood that was hinged at the front. This setup gave unprecedented access to all of the mechanical components and became the industry standard.

Like the outgoing B series, the R series was initially powered by the Thermodyne series of gasoline and diesel engines of six- and eight-cylinder varieties. By 1966, the new Maxidyne diesel engine had supplanted the earlier engines. Engine codes were broken down as follows: EN for gasoline, END for engine, diesel, and ENDT for engine, diesel, turbocharged, followed by three digits being the engine displacement in cubic inches.

In addition to the regular R series, Mack developed a cab/hood combination derivative to offer a shorter bumper-to-back-of-cab (BBC) length, known as the U series. The U had an offset cab, coined the "Commandcab", that placed the driver's door in the same vertical plane as the side of the trailer. To compensate for the offset cab the engine “doghouse” intruded into the passenger footwell but left the driver's position intact. The U series superseded the C series, with a BBC length only one inch longer (89 vs 90) but with the improvements of the R cab. While the U series was only ever offered as a tractor, the offset cab layout would also be used in the DM series.

The DM was an extra-heavy-duty version of the U often used in 6×4 construction trucks. Like the RMM, the DMM was all-wheel-drive, but it had not only a short hood and offset cab but also a set-back front axle, requiring a model-specific fiberglass hood-and-fender arrangement.

Mack also developed an RL lightweight series, primarily as a "western model". The RL made use of significantly more aluminum, including in the frame and other components.

== Production history ==
=== 1965–1975 ===
With the introduction of the Maxidyne ENDT-675 in 1966, Mack offered a series of engines that provided better fuel economy and less driver fatigue. The engines produced what Mack called constant-power, with high levels and max levels of horsepower and torque offered at a low and narrow RPM band. This allowed the operator to shift less, lowering the effort needed to drive the trucks.

In addition to the Maxidyne engine, Mack also introduced the Maxitorque transmission.

The RL series was introduced in 1967, and in 1973 the R cab was given a makeover to include a deeper rear wall for more room and a new dashboard design. Additionally, the dashboard was modified to include more plastic components.

=== 1975–1985 ===
The RW Superliner with a large, rectangular hood and grill came in 1977.

=== 1985–1995 ===
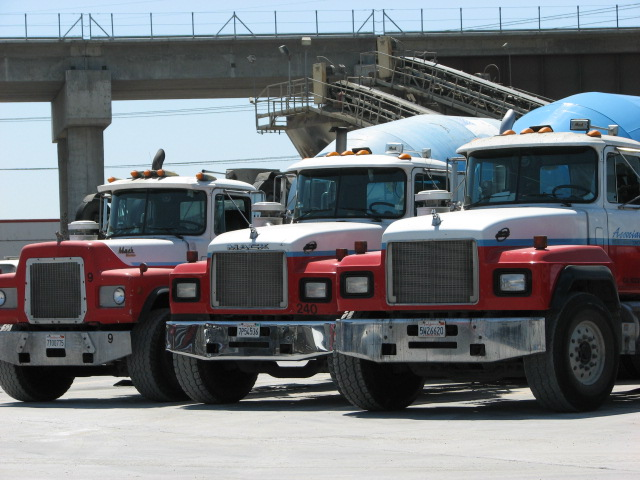
R (left) and RD Mixers with old and new fiberglass noses

By 1988 the numbering system had changed slightly. The prefix “D" and "T”, no longer needed as all engines were diesel and turbocharged, were discarded, as was the "N". The prefix “M” was for “Maxidyne” wide power range models, C was for California certified engines. A “6” was for the 672 cu in (11.0 L) I6, “9” was for the 998 cu in (16.4 L) V8, in 1987 the "7” 728 cu in (11.9 L) I6 was introduced. The next three digits were the horsepower rating of the engine, and an “L” suffix indicated an "Econodyne" low speed model. An example of the difference would be the ENDT673 and later E6-200 being similar engines.

The setback front axle RB was introduced in the 1990s.

The RD was given a new more aerodynamic nose in 1991, with square sealed beam headlights. The other R models would continue with the '65 era nose until they went out of production.

=== 1995–2004 ===
The RD/RM ended production in late 2003 as a 2004 model. The RB and DM were scheduled to be built into 2004.

==== Legend Special Edition ====
A small series of "R-Model Legend" models were built at the end of the RD/RM production run. These models, announced by Mack in 2003, included a special steering wheel, limited edition paint, badges chrome and embroidered seats. Mack was reported to have planned to make 100, but it is unclear how many were actually built.

== R series Cab ==
Mack utilized the cab of the R in a variety of ways beyond the R itself. With the B series still in widespread use in the late 1960's, Mack offered a B to R upgrade for the cab and front sheet metal called a B.C.R. (B converted to R) kit. This allowed operators to keep the mechanical portions of the older truck that may have not needed replacement and marry them with the much improved cab of the R. It is unclear of how many of these kits were sold and installed.

Truck manufacturer Brockway also used a modified version of the R cab on their 700 series Husky line of trucks in the mid-70's, which is often attributed as one of the reasons that Brockway went out of business. Brockway was attempting to expand market share, competing directly with its parent company Mack and having a vehicle with an almost exact same cab did not help the smaller company differentiate itself.The cabs for both Mack and Brockway were manufactured by Sheller Globe.

== Military service ==
=== R-11 Refueler ===
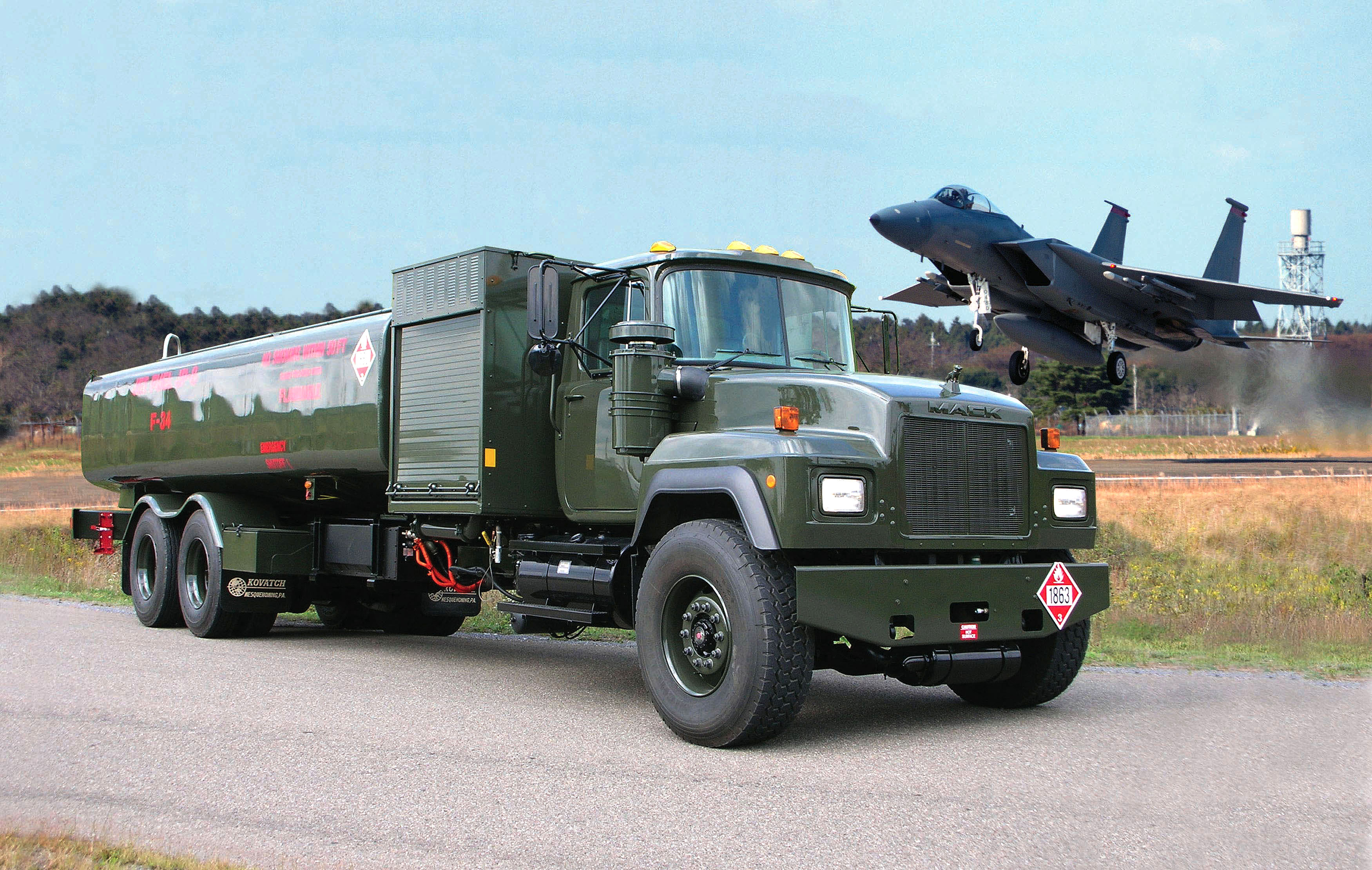

In conjunction with the US Air Force, Mack built a prototype heavy-duty hybrid electric av gas refueler in 2005. This RD utilized the hybrid engine to reduce fuel costs and emissions. According to the Air Force, "The vehicle operates with a diesel engine, an electric motor and a battery pack to optimize fuel efficiency. After the hybrid is started, the electric motor, which draws stored electricity from the battery pack, is used to get the vehicle up to speed, the lieutenant said. Once the truck is at an optimal speed, the diesel engine takes over. The battery pack restores energy by a regenerative braking process. The system captures energy that is lost during the driver's "stop and go" process."

== Foreign production ==
In addition the US plants, Mack produced the R model (and some derivatives) in both Australia, New Zealand and Iran.

=== Australia ===
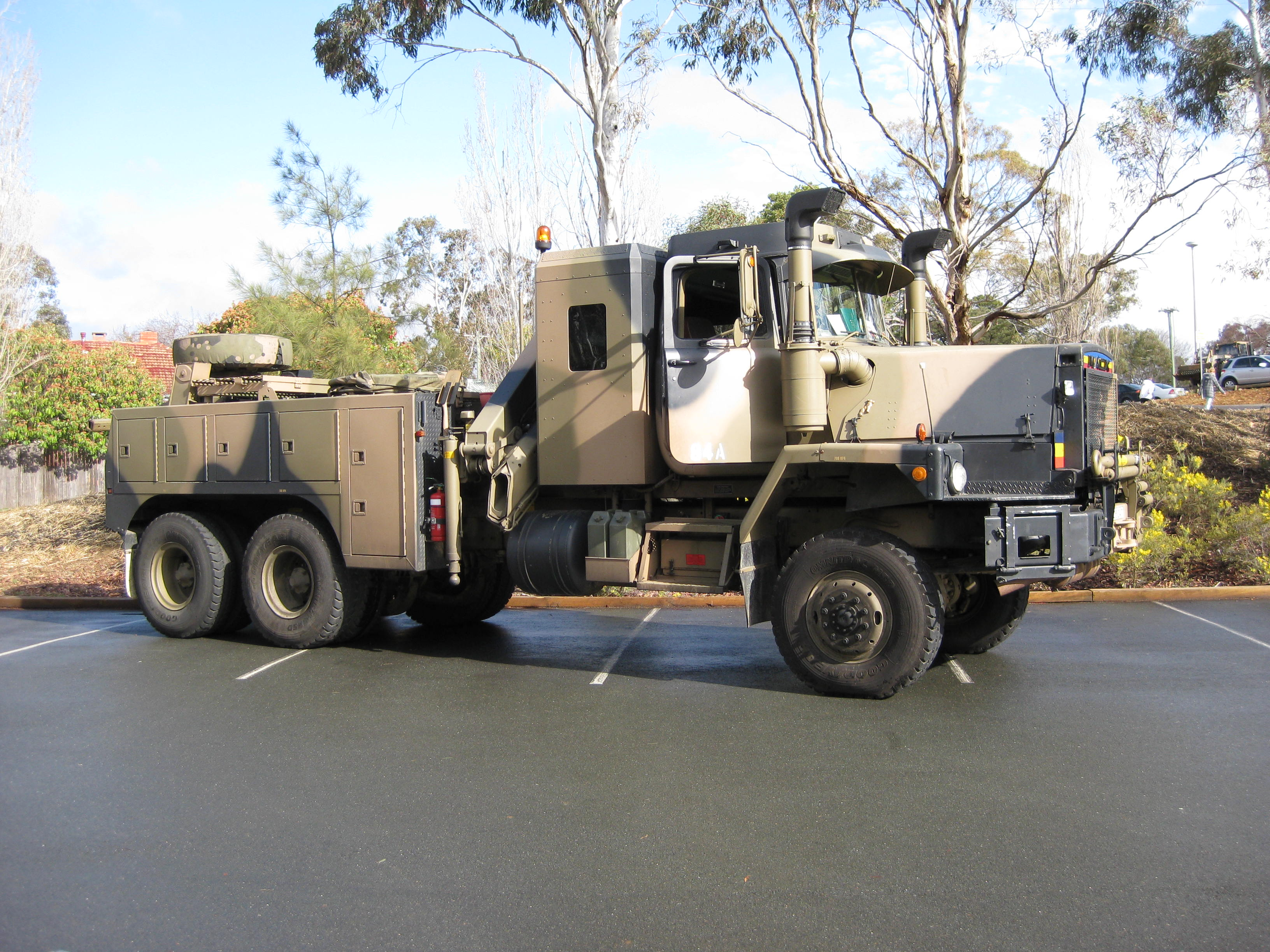

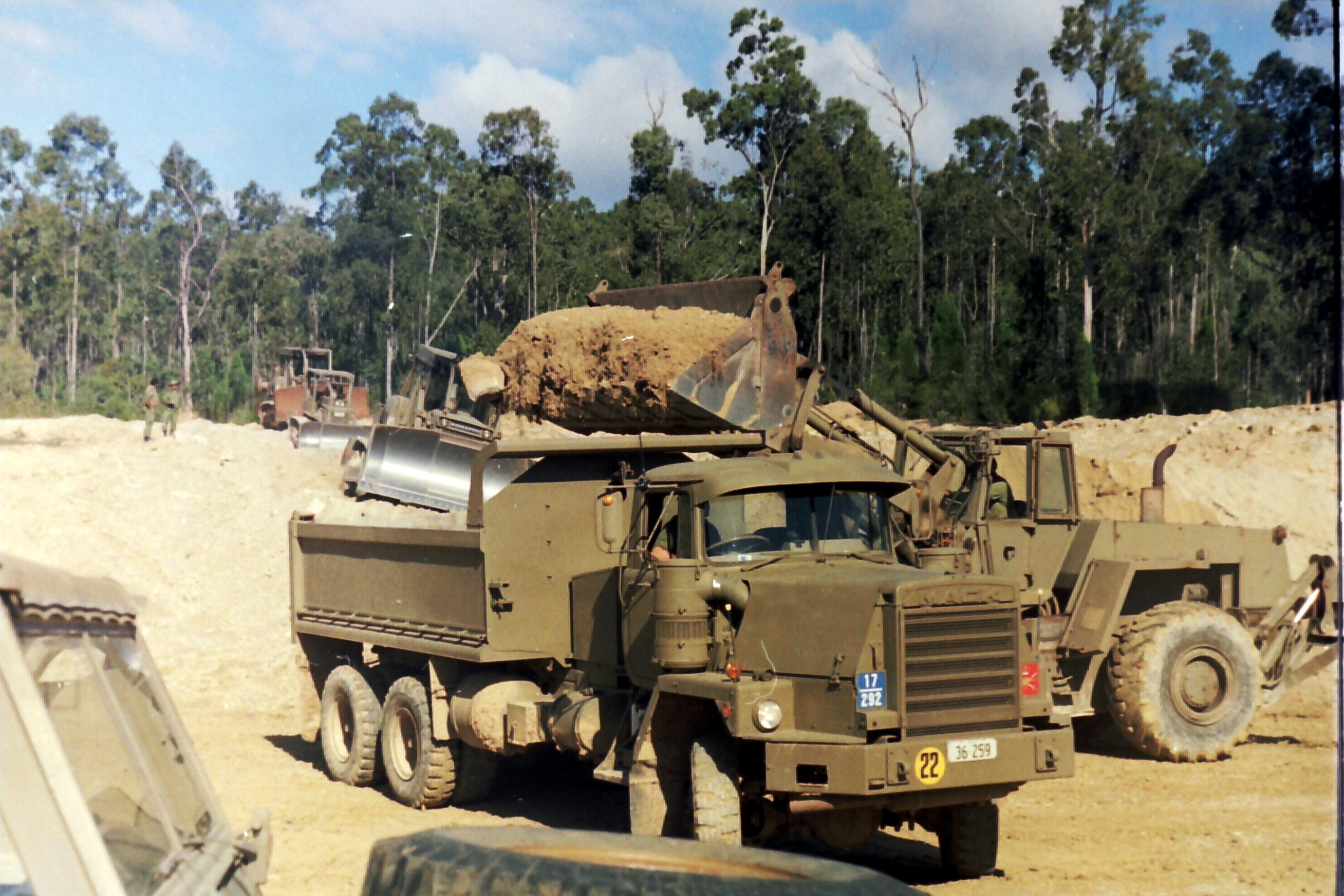

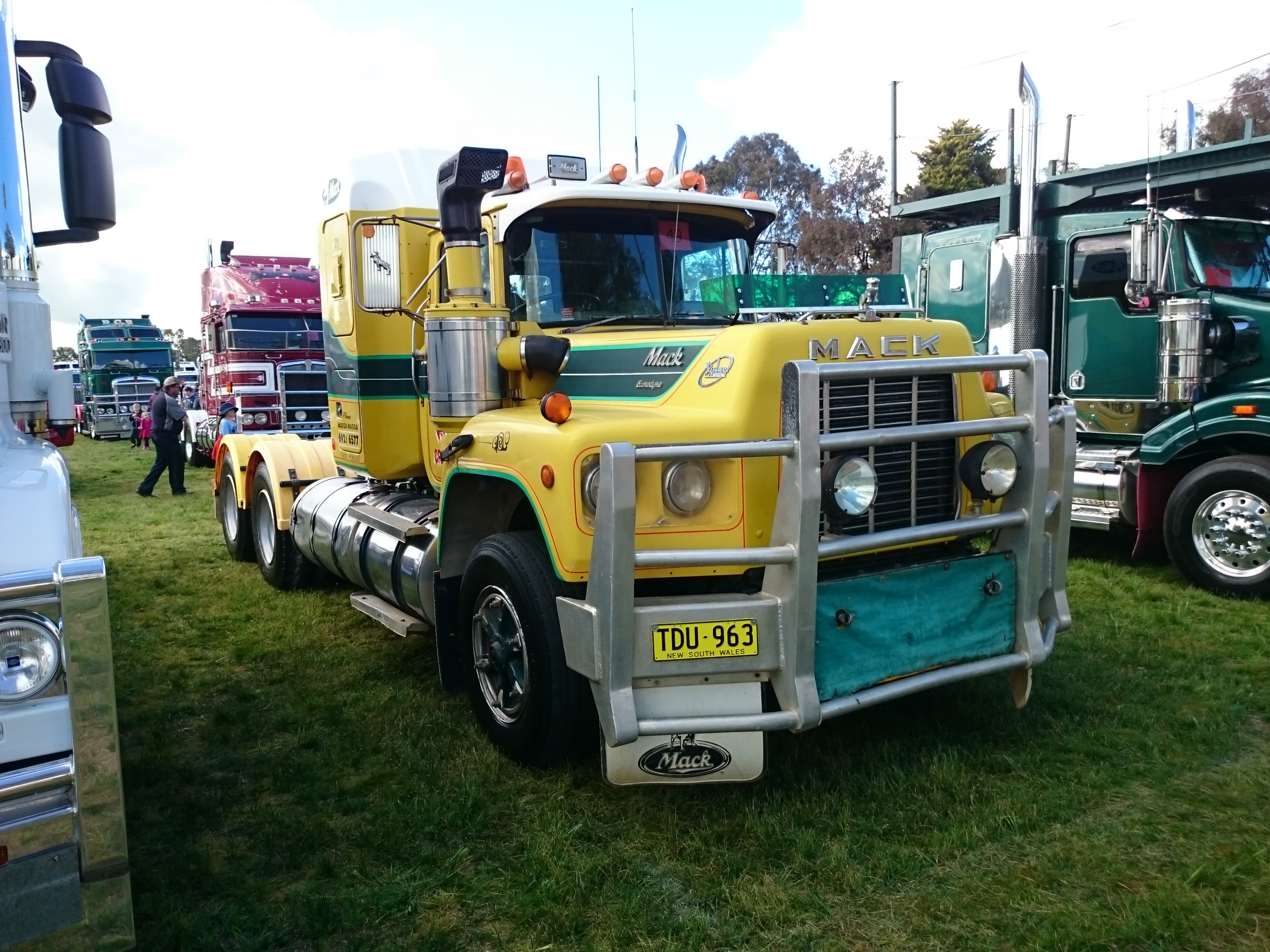

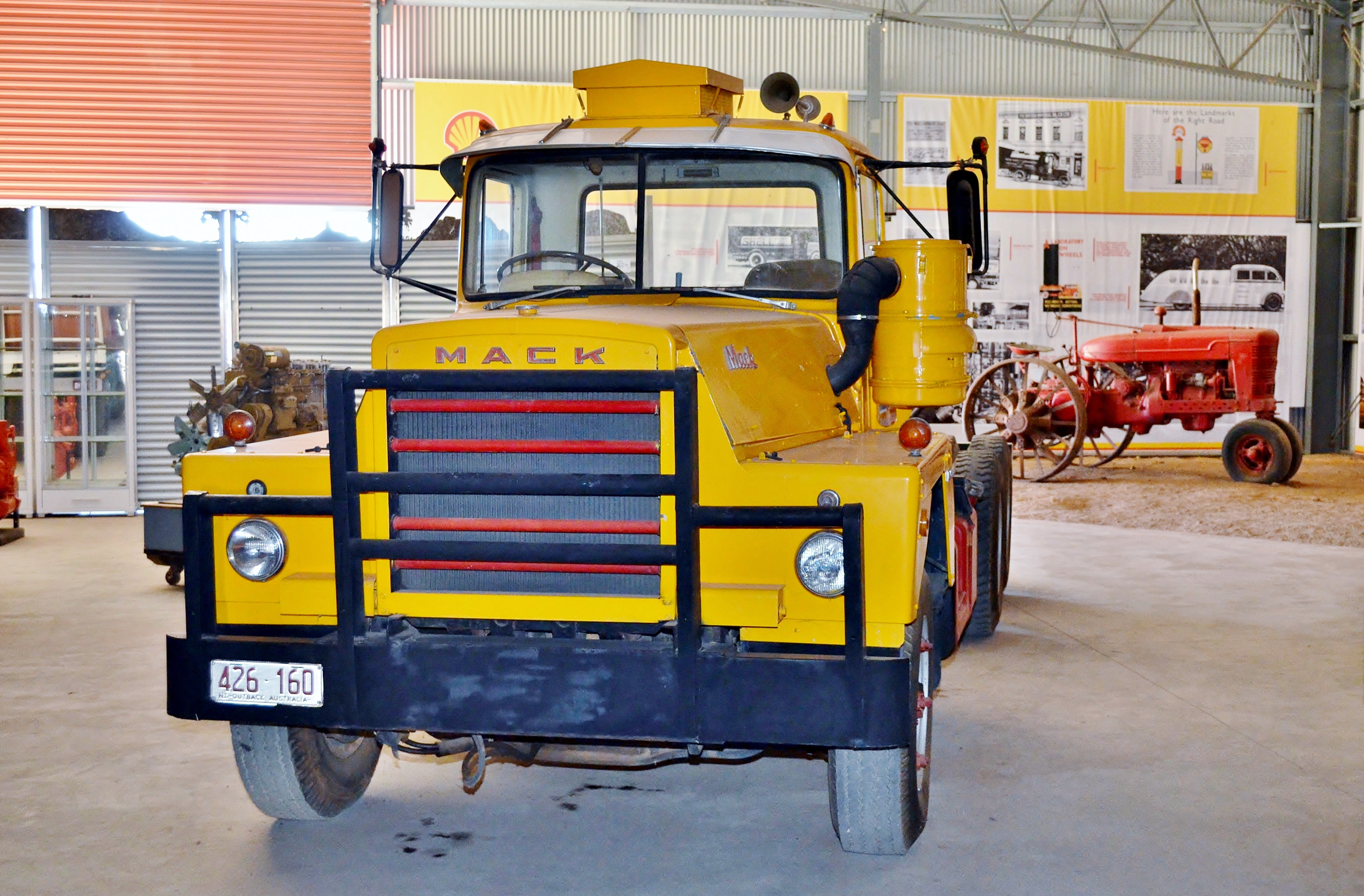

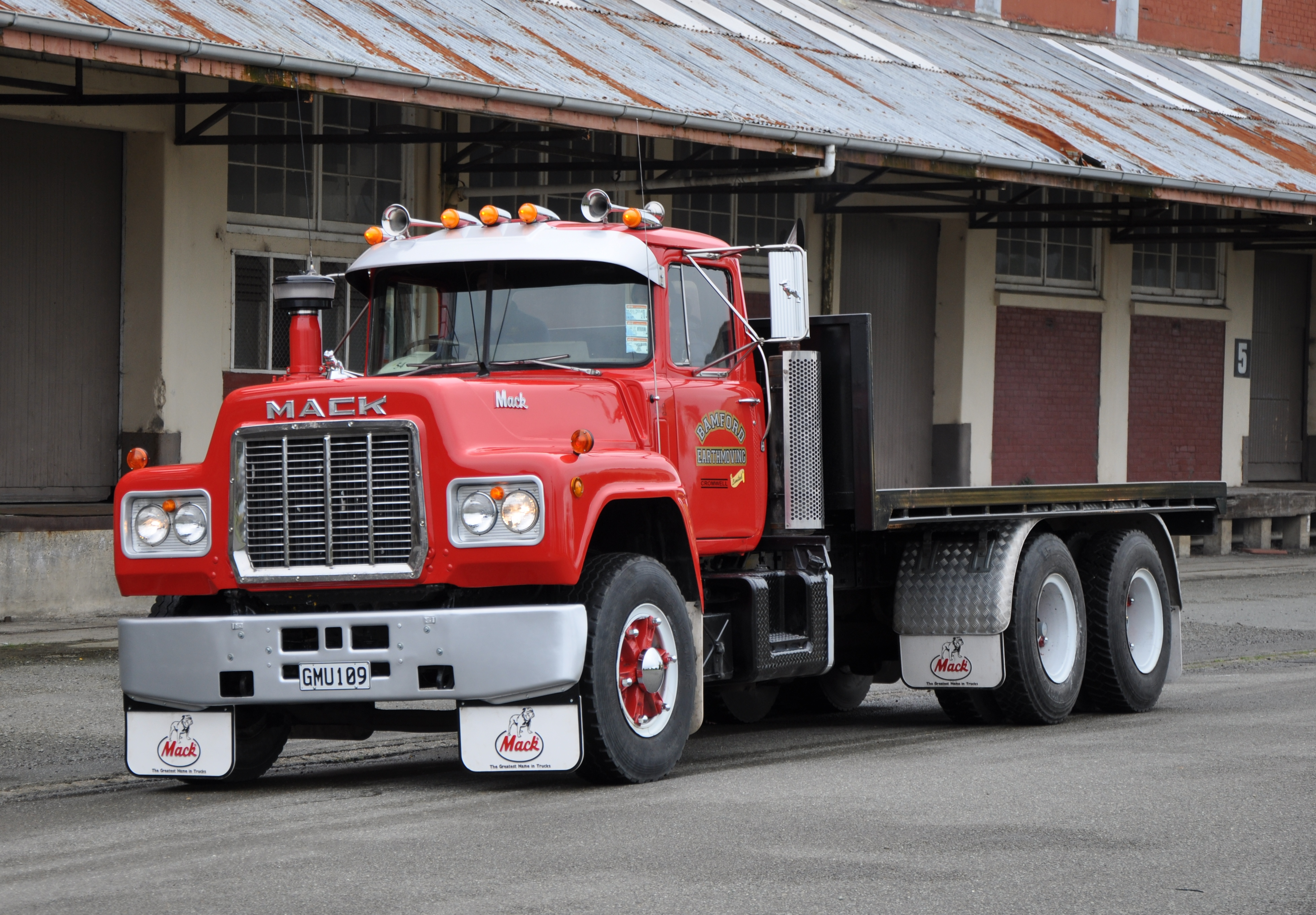

=== Iran ===
Iran Kaveh established ties with Mack in 1963 to produce licensed built trucks including the R. Approximately 60% of the content being Iranian sourced. Specifications and design of the R were modified to be suitable to Iran. With over 98% of the heavy duty trucks in Iran being Macks, either being produced locally or imported, the fall of the Shah in 1979, Iran Kaveh put an end to sales of new Macks in the country. It was estimated that in 1987 there were between 35,000–55,000 Mack trucks operating in Iran.

Mack Canada made a shipment of 20 non-military RD 800 series trucks rigged for oil field operations to the National Iranian Drilling Co. of Tehran in 1987; this was the first shipment to Iran since 1979.

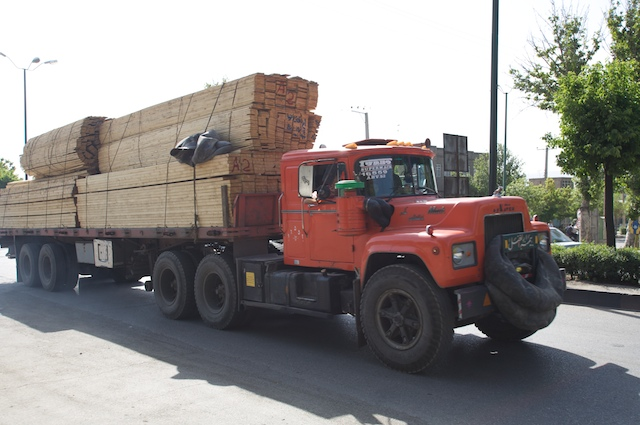

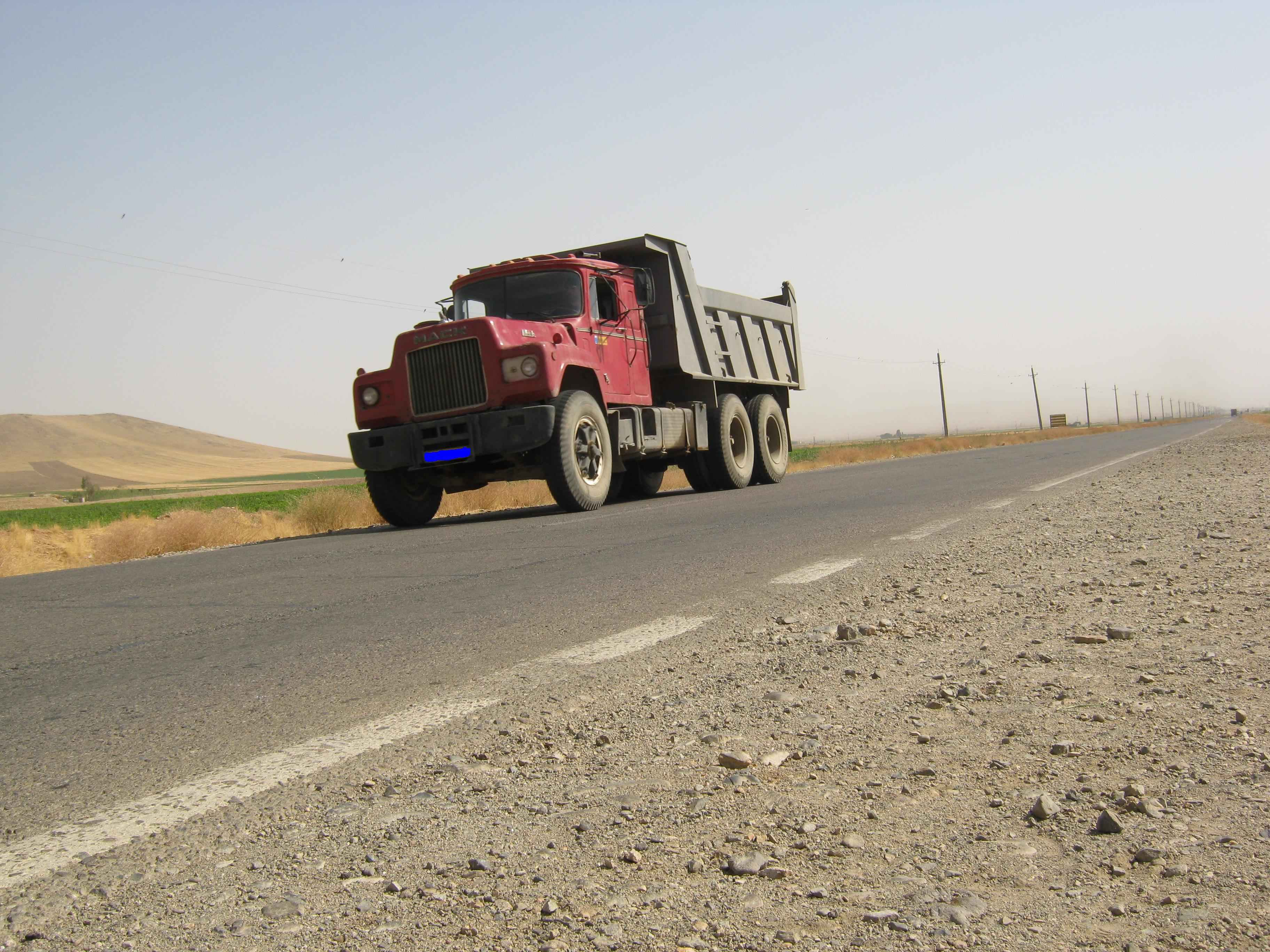

== Model designations ==
- R – Standard model
- RB – Set back front axle (except in New Zealand – see NZ Mack RB)
- RD – Heavy Duty R
- RM – 4x4 Municipal/maintenance chassis
- RMM – 6x6 Municipal/maintenance chassis
- RS – Western R series, S (steel frame)
- RL – Western R series, L (aluminum frame)
- RW – Western series, replaced by the Mack Super-Liner
- U – Short hood offset cab
- DM – Heavy-duty U
- DMM – All wheel drive DM

Suffix letters:

- T – Tractor
- S – Six wheel chassis
- L – Light weight components
- X – Extreme duty

== Gallery ==
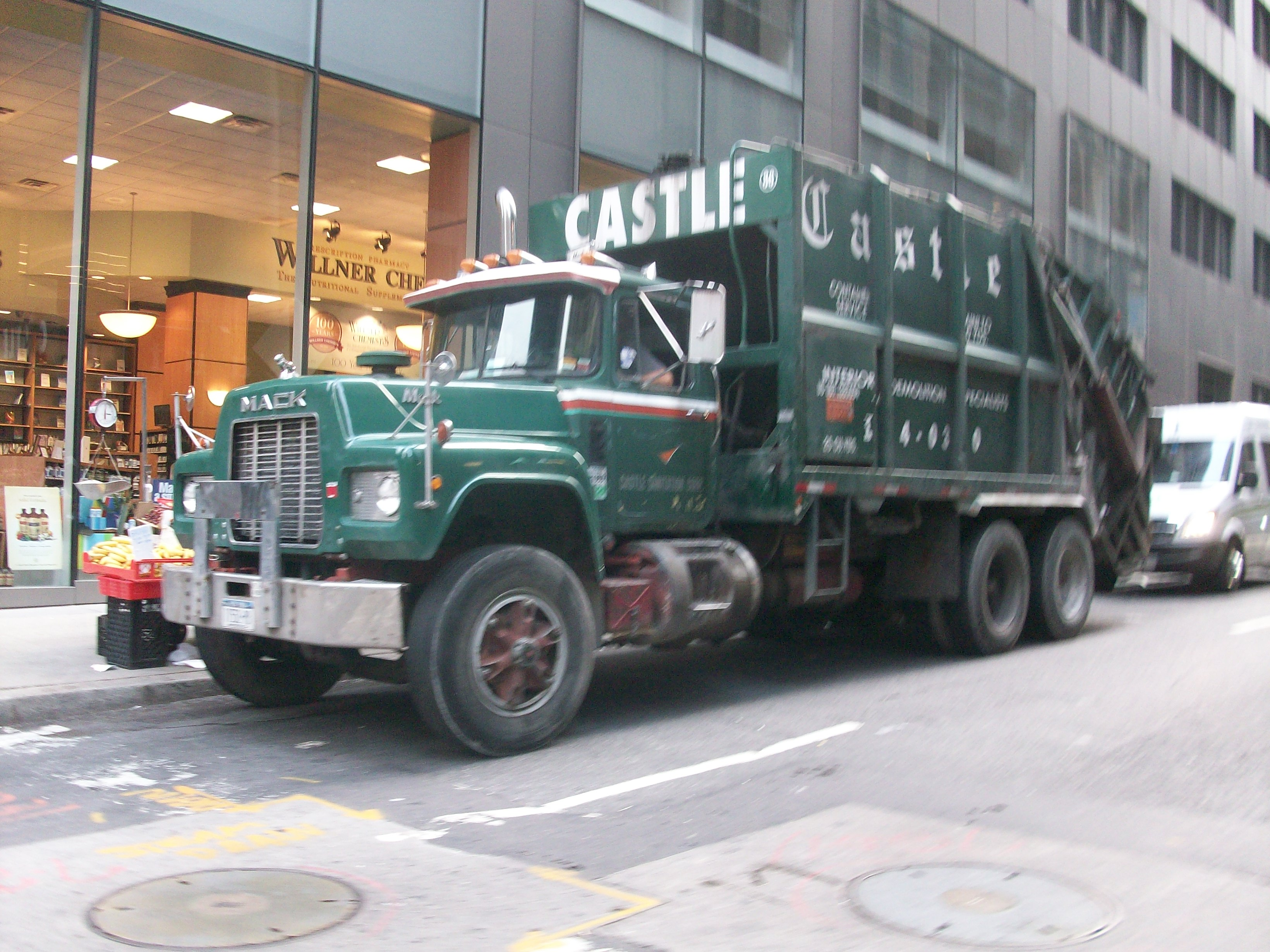
R refuse truck

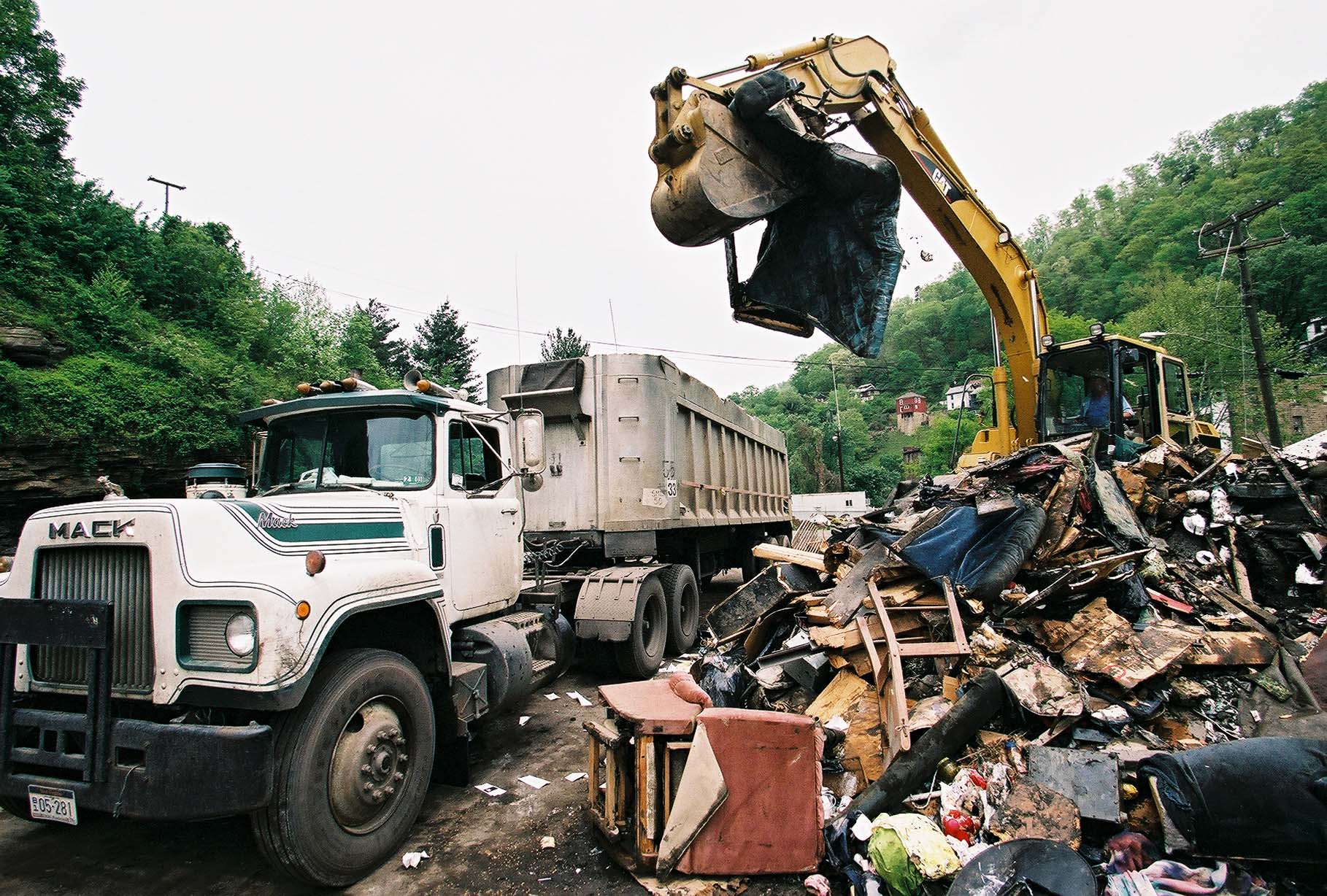
R semi-tractor

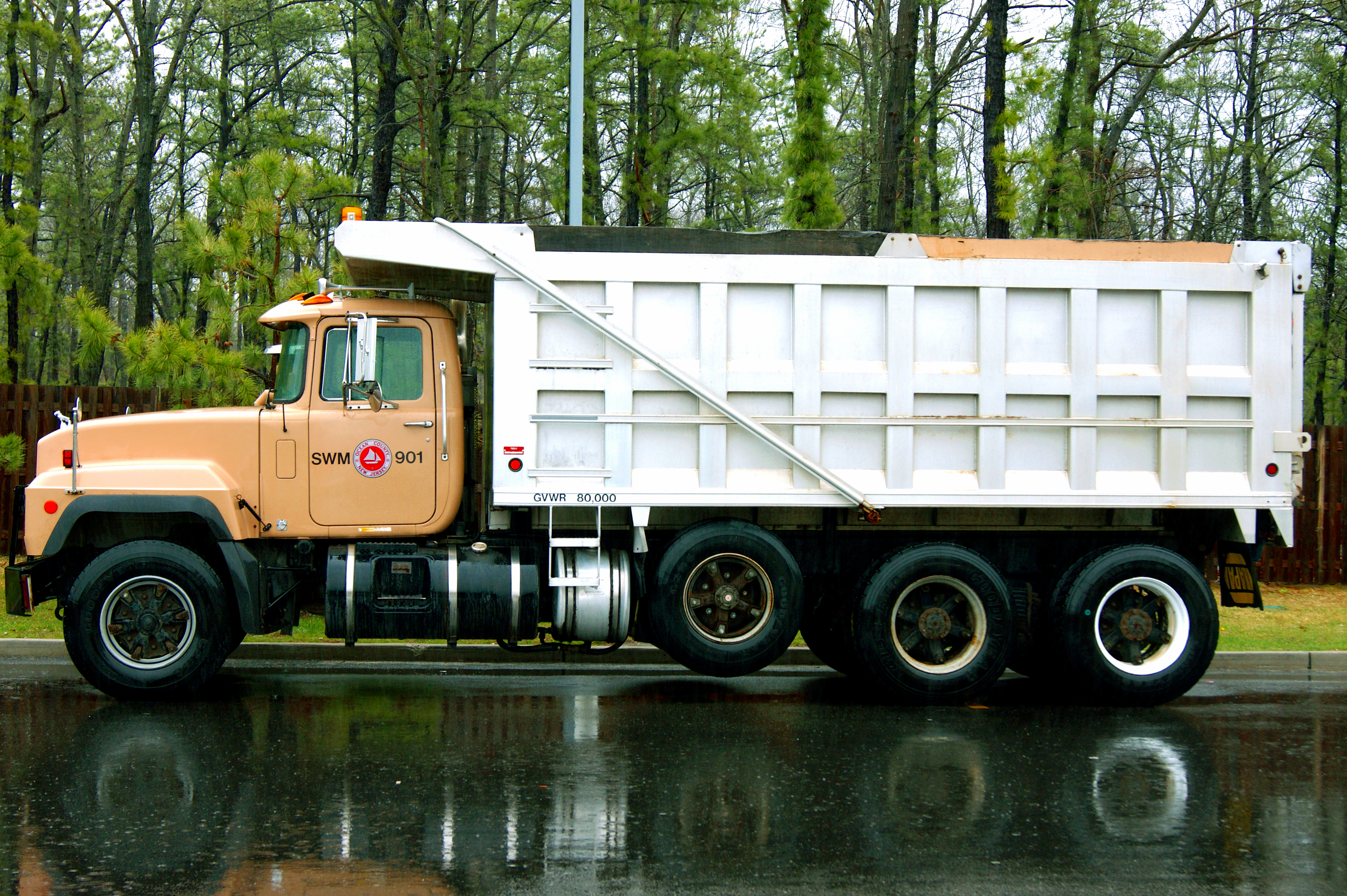
RD dump truck

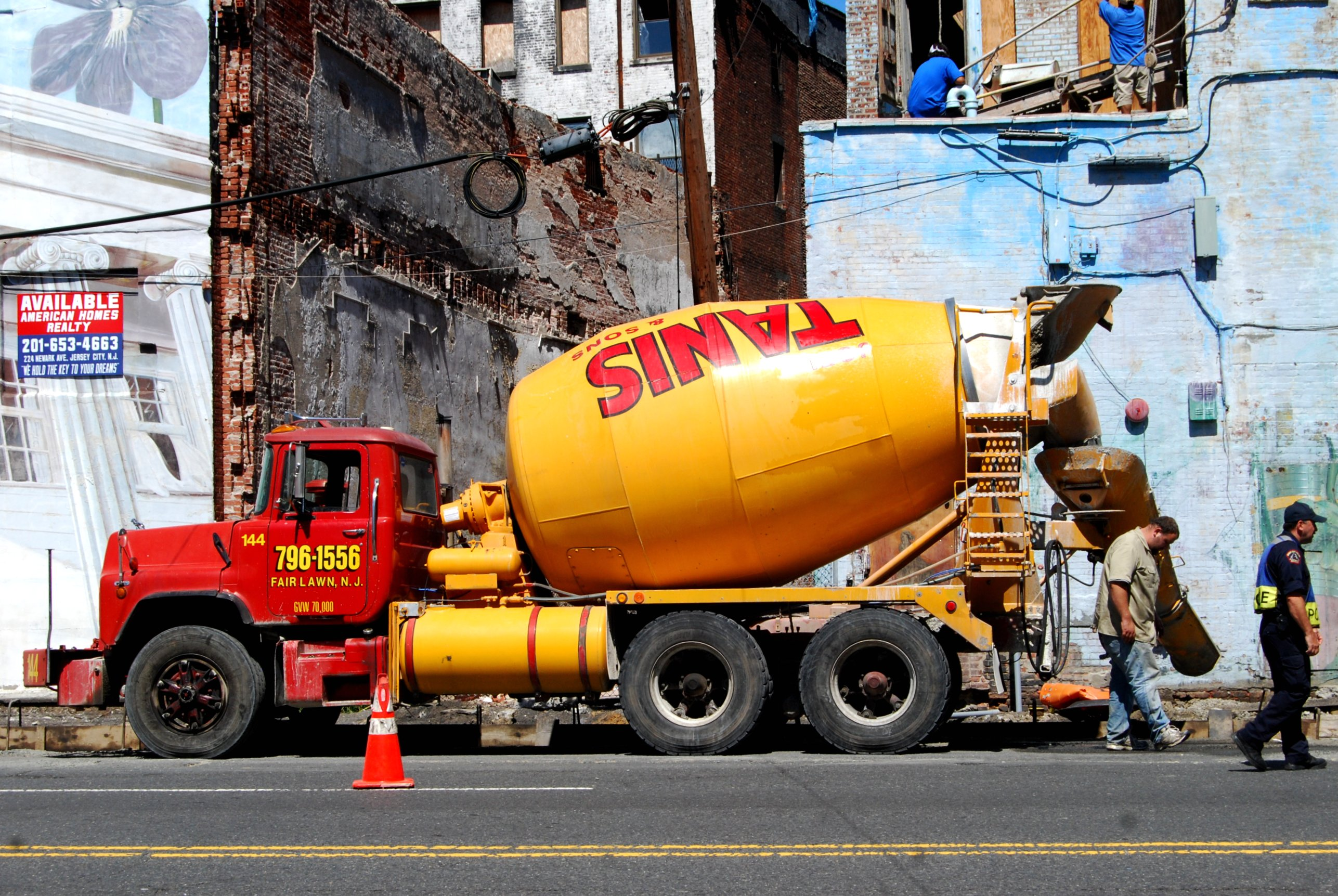
DM mixer truck

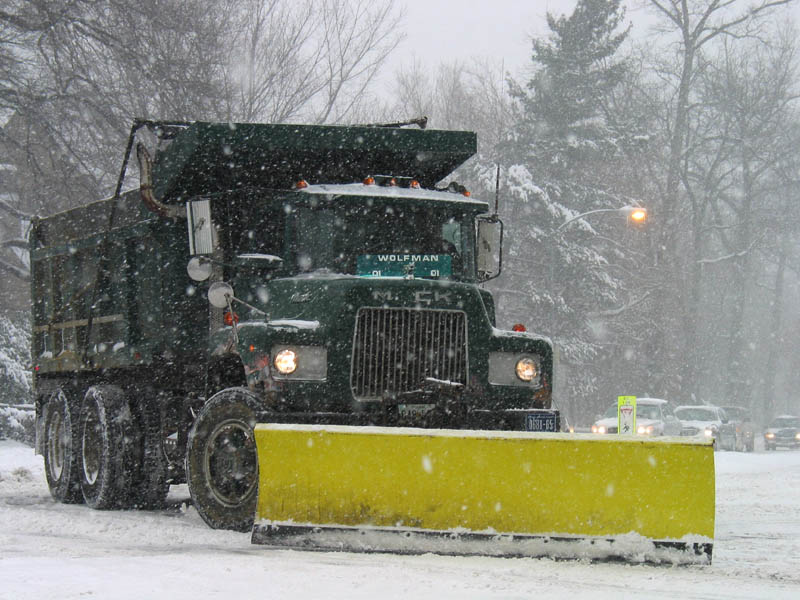
DM dump truck with snowplow

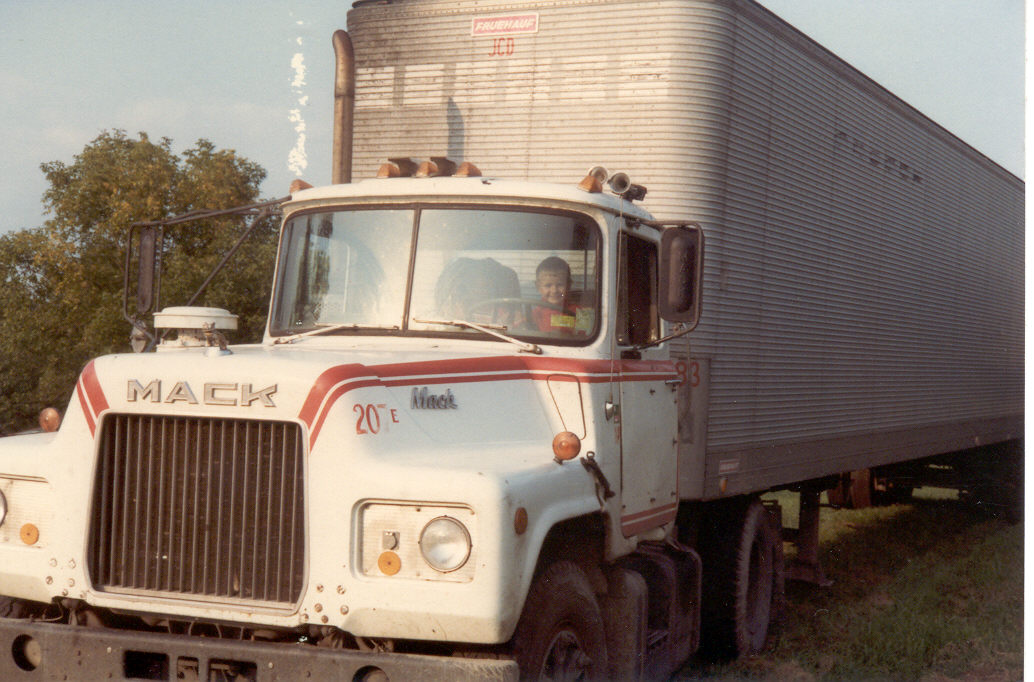
U-model with offset cab

== See also ==
- Mack Trucks
- List of Mack Trucks Products
