= Mack B series =

Mack B-series
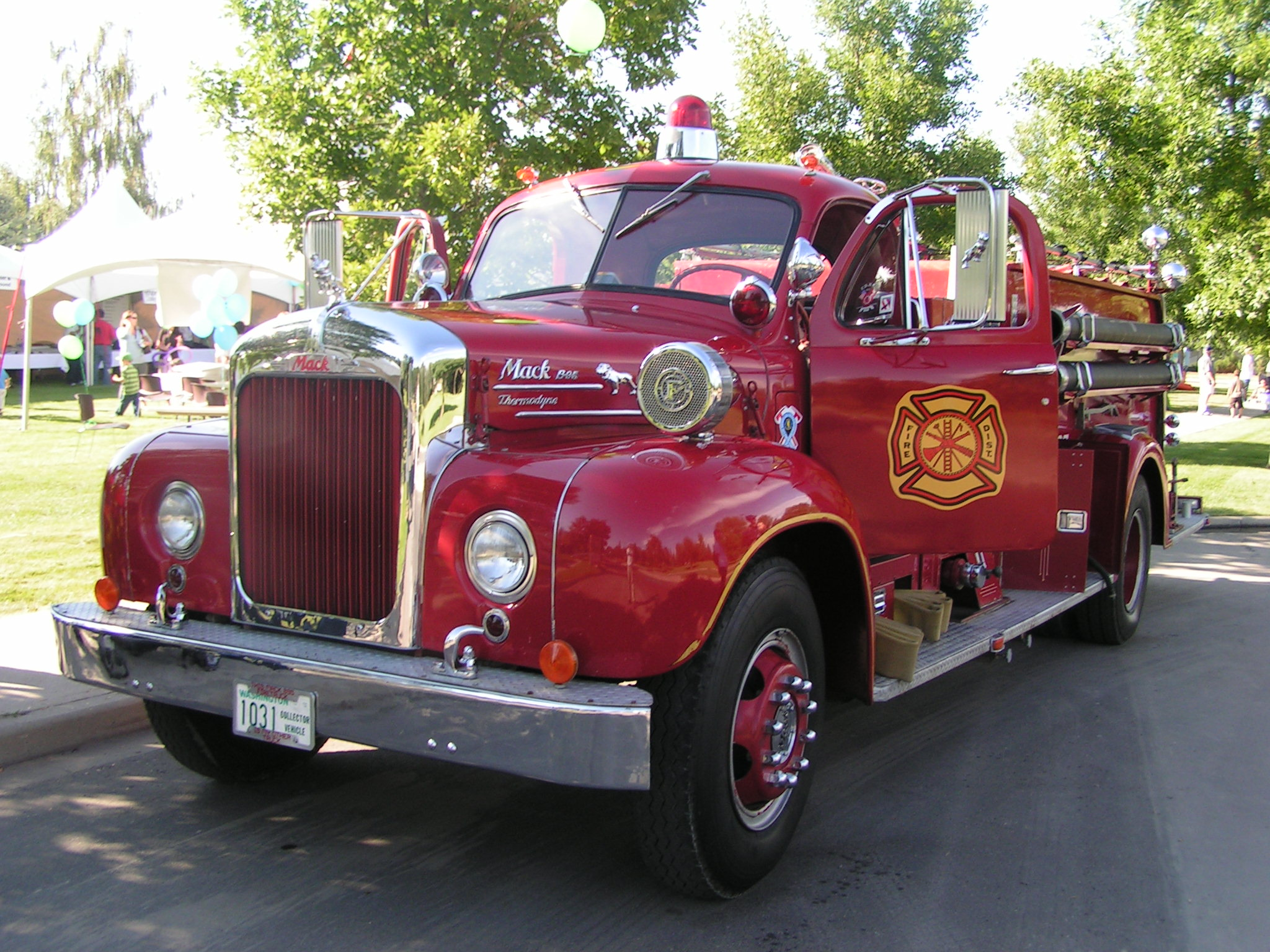
- 1961 Mack B-series fire truck

Overview
- Manufacturer: Mack Trucks
- Production: 1953-1966

Body and chassis
- Class: Truck
- Body style: Truck (bonneted cab): Tractor; Straight/rigid truck; Cowled chassis; School bus; Fire truck; Multi-stop truck

Powertrain
- Engine: 6.8 L Magnadyne I6 (112 kW) (petrol); 8.4 L I6 (103 kW) (diesel); 11.0 L Thermodyne I6 (139 kW) (diesel); 11.0 L Thermodyne I6 T (164 kW) (diesel); 11.6 L Thermodyne I6 (157 kW) (diesel); 14.0 L Cummins NTC I6 T (250 kW) (diesel); 14.2 L Thermodyne V8 (190 kW) (diesel)
- Transmission: Mack 10-speed duplex (5-speed, 2-speed auxiliary); Mack 15-speed triplex (5-speed, 3-speed auxiliary); Mack 20-speed quadruplex (5-speed, 4-speed auxiliary)

Chronology
- Predecessor: Mack L-series
- Successor: Mack R-series

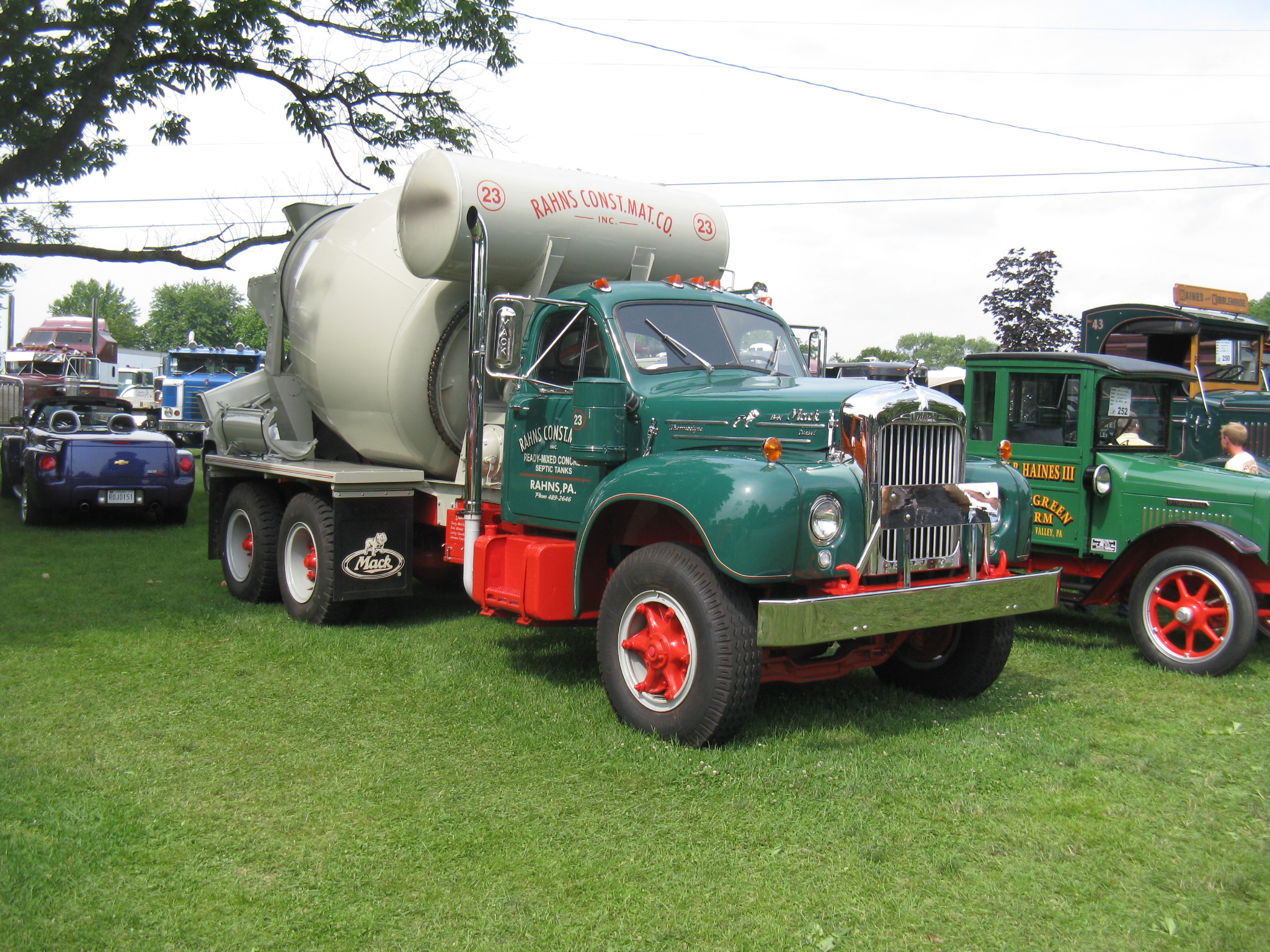
B Model Mixer

The Mack B series is a model line of trucks produced by Mack Trucks between 1953 and 1966. The successor to the 1940-1956 Mack L series, the B-series was a line of heavy conventional-cab trucks. Adopting a more streamlined appearance over its predecessor, the B-series was designed with a sloped windshield and larger, rounded fenders The model line was sold in multiple configurations, including tractors and straight/rigid trucks, cowled chassis (delivery body or bus), or fire trucks.

During 1966, Mack replaced the B-series with the Mack R-series, which lasted into the 21st century. In total, 126,745 examples of the B-series were produced over 13 years.

== Model numbers & letters ==
Chassis model designations:

- B1x -
- B2x -
- B3x -
- B4x -
- B5x -
- B6x -
- B7x -
- B8x -
- B9x -

Chassis letter guide:

B - school bus chassis
C - flat face cowl for the addition of a delivery body
E - built for export
F - fire truck chassis
L - light weight or weight reduced by using aluminum components
P - platform chassis (single axle straight truck)
R - right hand drive. This designation was started in 1964 but right hand drive available
S - six wheel chassis (tandem axle)
T - tractor chassis
X - severe or extreme service chassis

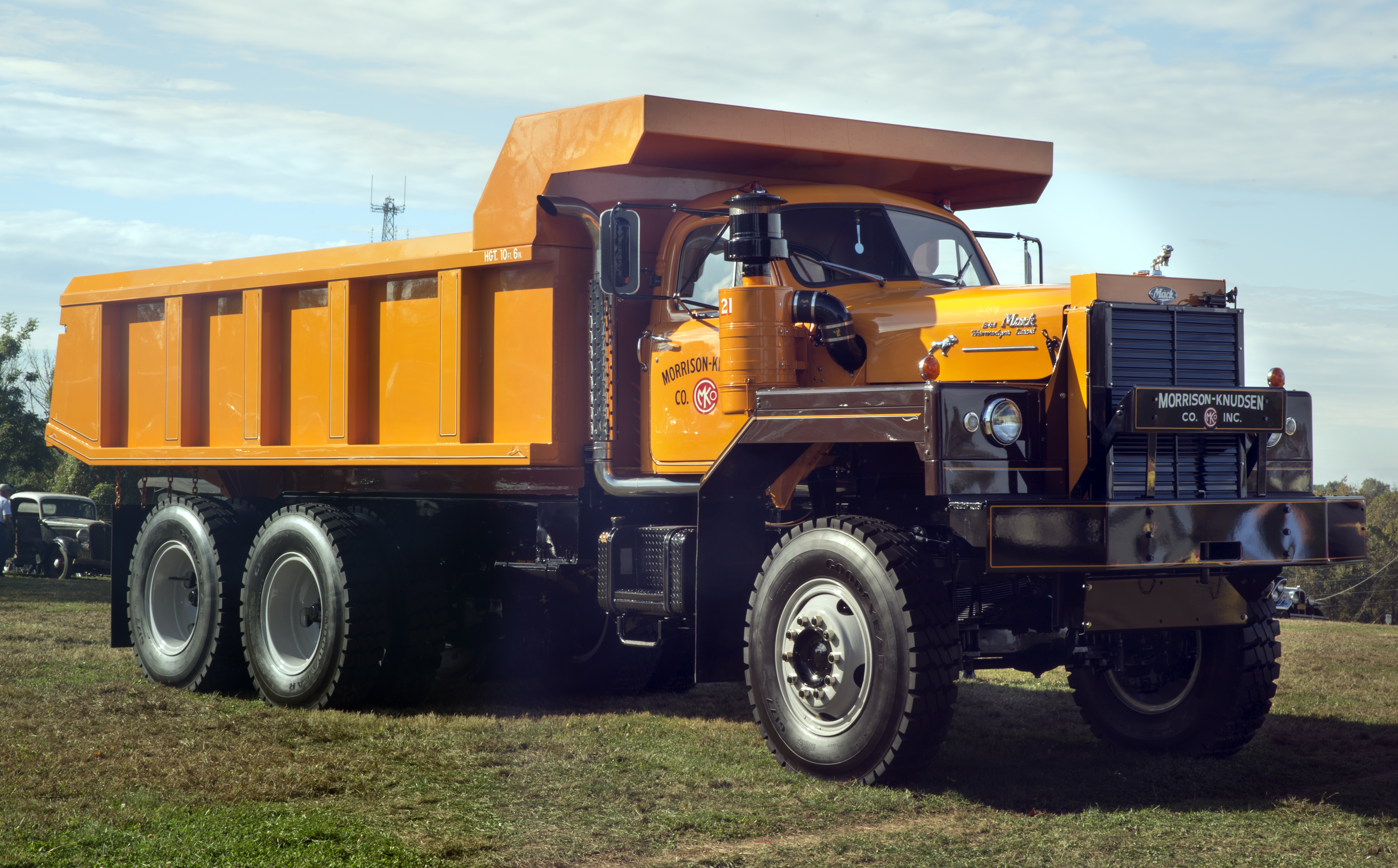
Mack B81 (the heaviest duty range) dump truck

== Engines ==
The B Model offered 10 different gasoline engines, from a 291 cu in (4.8 L) with 107 hp (80 kW) in the B20 to a 707 cu in (11.6 L) with 232 hp (173 kW) in the B70.

A wide range of diesels were also offered. From the B61 up to the ENDT 673 turbocharged I6 and END 864 V8 were offered. From the B73 up to the Cummins 855 cu in (14.0 L) I6s up to the NTC335 were available.

The table shows the largest gasoline and diesel engines in the series.

Model	Engine	Displacement	Type	Horsepower	Torque
B20	EN291	291 cu in (4.8 L)	G I6	107 hp (80 kW) at 2800	232 lbf⋅ft (315 N⋅m) at 1400
B30	EN331	331 cu in (5.4 L)	G I6	122 hp (91 kW) at 2800	264 lbf⋅ft (358 N⋅m) at 1400
B4X	EN414	413 cu in (6.8 L)	G V8	214 hp (160 kW) at 4000	
	END673	672 cu in (11.0 L)	D I6		
B53	END673				
B6X	EN540	540 cu in (8.8 L)	G I6	185 hp (138 kW) at 2400	445 lbf⋅ft (603 N⋅m) at 1300
	ENDT673	672 cu in (11.0 L)	TD I6		
	END864	864 cu in (14.2 L)	D V8		
B7X	EN707	707 cu in (11.6 L)	G I6	205 hp (153 kW) at 2100	615 lbf⋅ft (834 N⋅m) at 1200
	NTC335	855 cu in (14.0 L)	TD I6	335 hp (250 kW) at 2100	
B8X	EN707				
	NTC335				

(Type: G=gasoline, D=diesel, TD=turbocharged diesel)

== See also ==
- Mack Trucks
- List of Mack Trucks Products
