= South Australian Railways B class =

Class of Australian locomotives

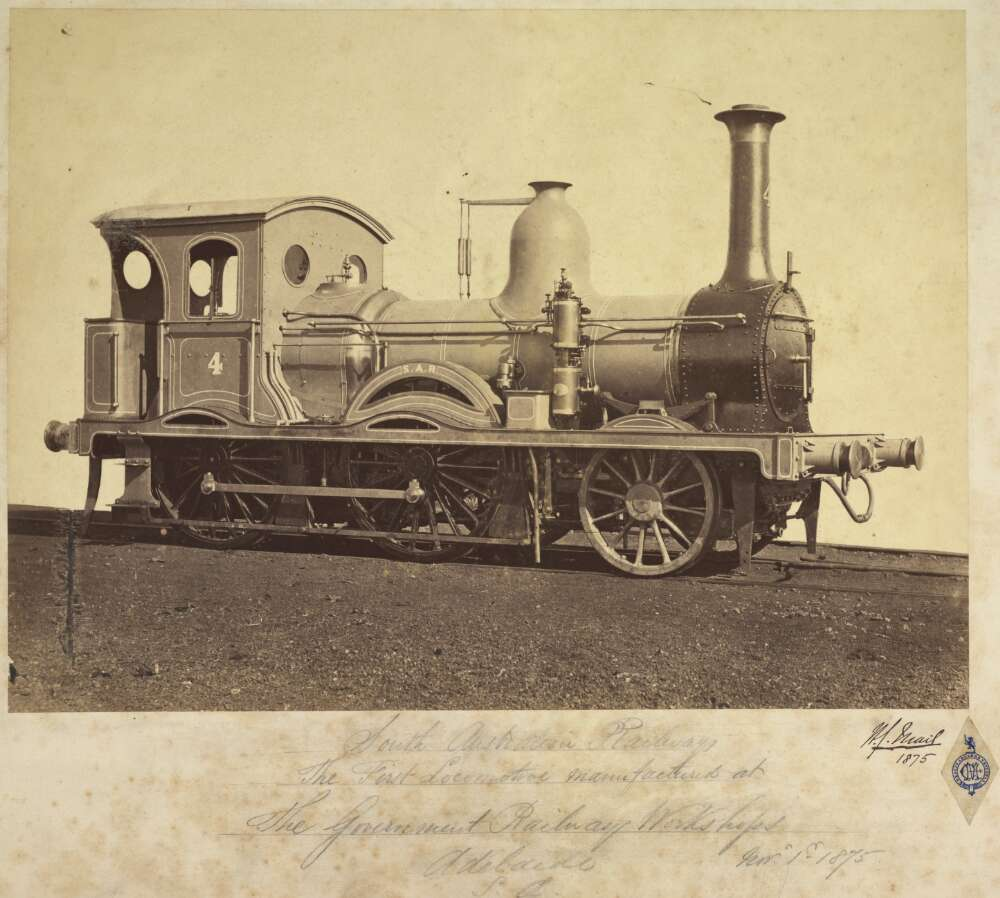
- The first locomotive manufactured at the Government Railway workshops, Adelaide, S.A. http://nla.gov.au/nla.obj-145876288/view
Type and origin
- Power type: Steam
- Builder: Robert Stephenson and Company
- Build date: 1856
- Total produced: 2
- Rebuild date: B 4 (1875 & 1892); B 7 (1876 & 1887)
Specifications
- Configuration
  - Whyte: 2-4-0 (as built); 2-4-0T (after rebuild)
- Gauge: 1,600 mm (5 ft 3 in)
- Driver dia.: 5 ft 6 in (1,676 mm)
- Height: 12 ft 3 in (3,733.8 mm)
- Axle load: 12 long tons 9 cwt (27,900 lb or 12.6 t)
- Loco weight: 33 long tons 0 cwt (73,900 lb or 33.5 t)
- Fuel type: Coal
- Fuel capacity: 3 long tons 15 cwt (8,400 lb or 3.8 t) (Tender); 0 long tons 6 cwt (700 lb or 0.3 t) (Tank)
- Water cap.: 1,060 imp gal (1,273 US gal; 4,819 L) (Tender); 500 imp gal (600 US gal; 2,273 L) (Tank)
- Boiler pressure: 130 psi (896 kPa)
- Heating surface
  - Firebox: 66 sq ft (6.1 m^{2})
  - Tubes: 728 sq ft (67.6 m^{2})
- Cylinders: 2
- Cylinder size: 14 in × 20 in (356 mm × 508 mm)
Performance figures
- Tractive effort: 6,562 lbf (29.19 kN)
Career
- Operators: South Australian Railways
- Class: B
- Numbers: 4, 7
- Withdrawn: 1935, 1938
- Disposition: Both scrapped

The South Australian Railways B class was a class of 2-4-0T steam locomotives operated by the South Australian Railways.

== History ==
In 1856, the South Australian Railways ordered two 2-4-0 tender locomotives from Robert Stephenson and Company, the first arriving in November 1856 and the second in March 1858. They entered service on the Gawler and Outer Harbor lines. In 1875, both were rebuilt as 2-4-0T tank engines. In 1887, number 7 was rebuilt by Islington Railway Workshops as a crane locomotive with number 4 following in 1893. Both were withdrawn and scrapped in the 1930s.

== Class list ==
Number	Date in Service	Date Condemned
4	November 1856	April 1938
7	March 1858	July 1935
