= B-class submarine =

B-class submarine may refer to the following

- British B-class submarine, a class of eleven submarines launched in 1904–1906 for the British Royal Navy
- Norwegian B-class submarine, a class of six Norwegian submarines built from 1922 to 1929
- Spanish B-class submarine, a class of six Spanish submarines launched between 1921 and 1923
- United States B-class submarine, a class of three submarines launched in 1907
- Type B submarine, a class of submarine in the Imperial Japanese Navy (IJN) which served during World War II
