= List of Mack Trucks products =

This is a list of current and past vehicles and other products from Mack Trucks.

== Cabovers ==
- G series
- D series
- N series
- W series
- H series
- F series

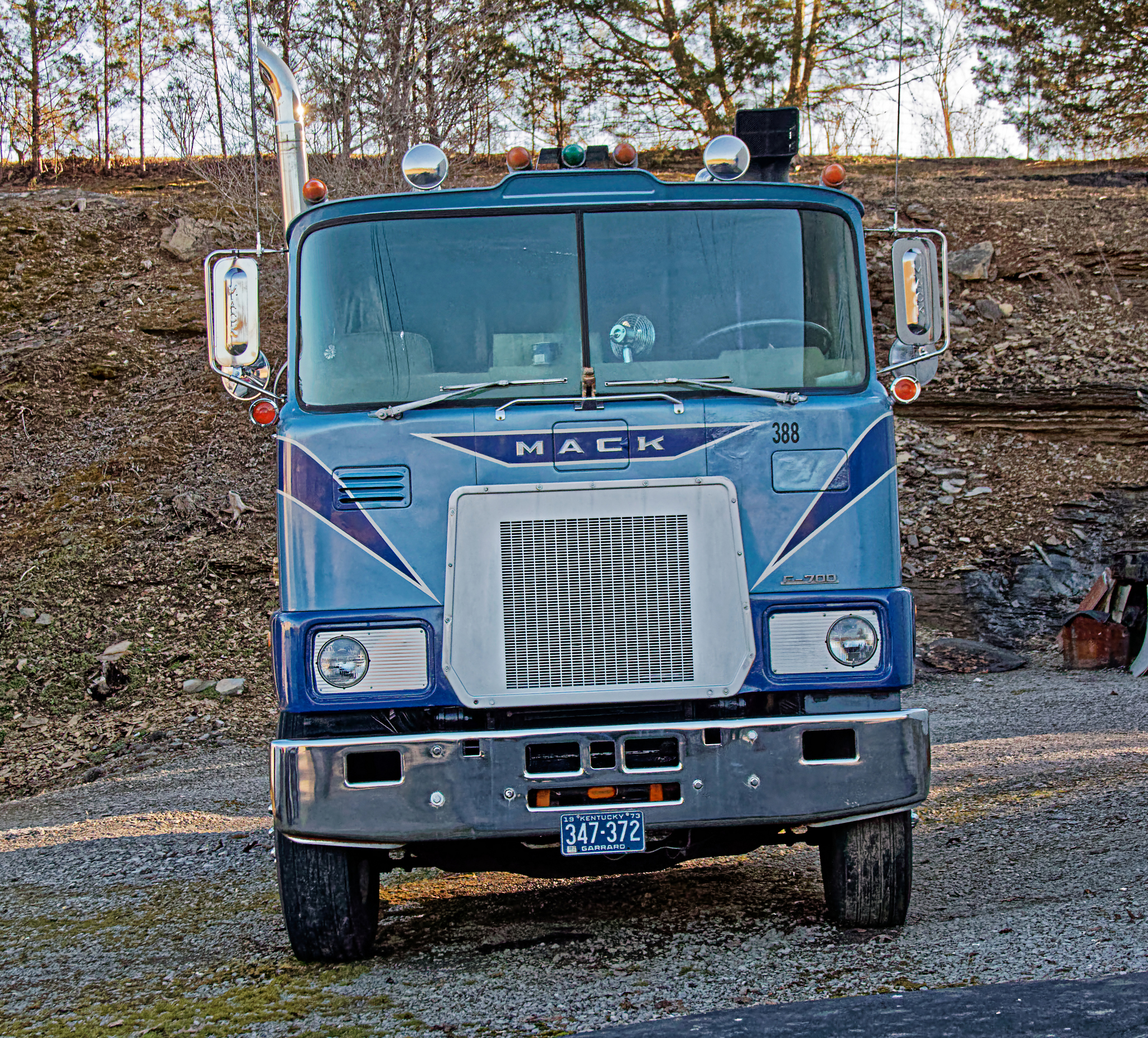
1976 Mack F-700 in Kentucky

- WR - Cruise-Liner series

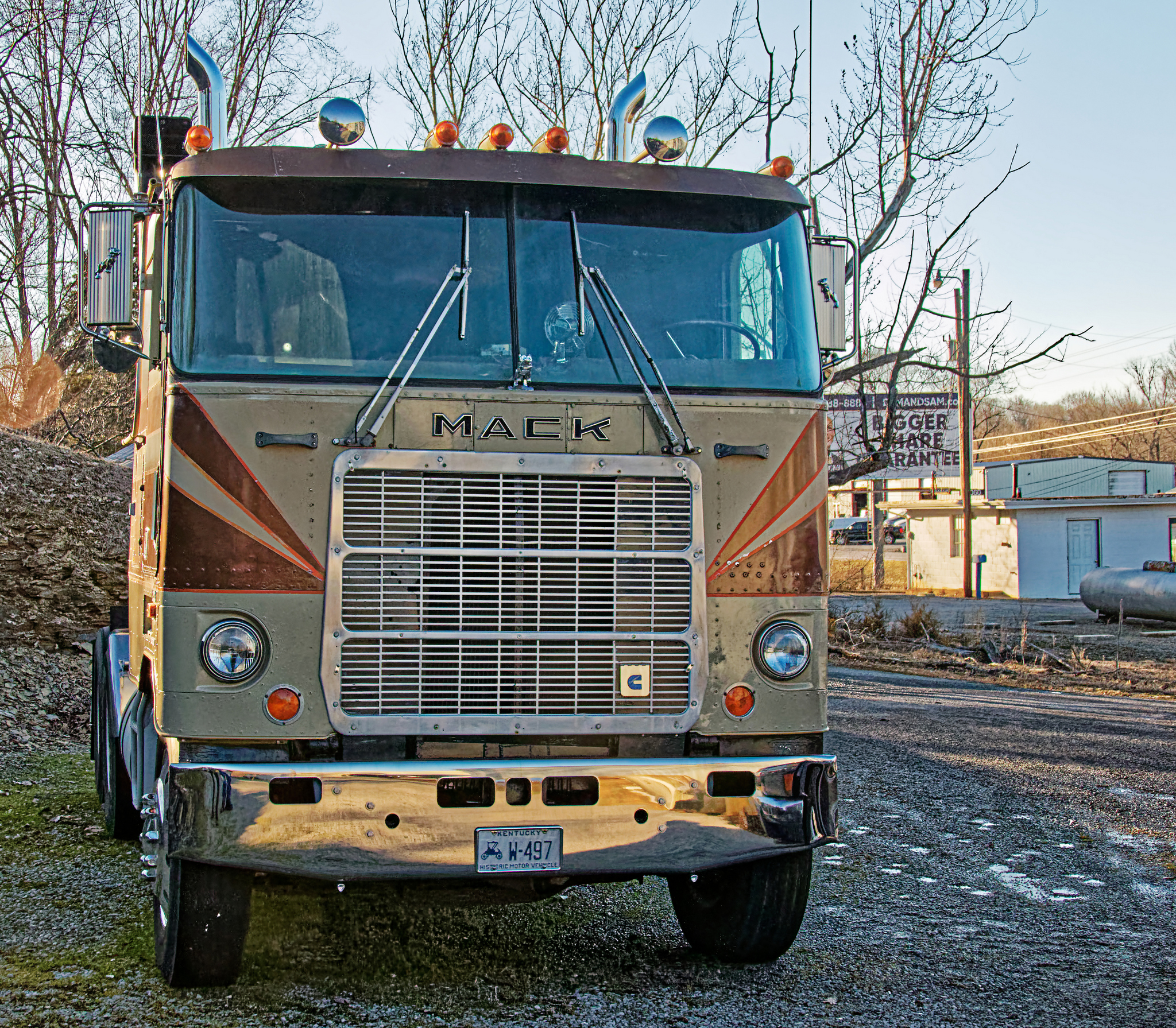
Jones Transport 1978 Mack Cruise-Liner

- MH - Ultra-Liner series
- MS - Mid-Liner series
- MB series
- MC / MR series
- TERRAPRO chassis MRU/LEU series
- LR Series

== Conventional ==
- A series
- L series
- B series
- C series
- CH series
- CL series
- CT series
- CV series
- CX series (Vision)
- D series
- E series
- R series
- DM series
- U series
- RW / Super-Liner series
- CHN series
- CXN series
- CXP series
- CHU series
- CXU series
- GU series
- Titan

== Australian production models ==
- Conventional:
  - Metro-Liner/Metro-Liner 8x4
  - Trident
  - Titan
  - Super-Liner and Super-Liner LT (Cat & Cummins engines available)
  - Valueliner
  - Fleet-Liner
  - Granite (as of 2008)
- Cabovers:
  - Qantum
  - Premium
- New Zealand only model: RB

== Specialty equipment ==
- FD - Front discharge Mixer chassis
- HMM - All wheel drive half cab mixer chassis

== Off-Highway ==
- AP Series- 1930-1938
- FSCW Series- 1937-1938
- NW Model- 1941
- M series- 1960-1967
- Bigfoot (Australia) 1996-2006

== Fire apparatus ==
- C Series- 1957-1967
- CF Series- 1967-1990

== Military trucks ==
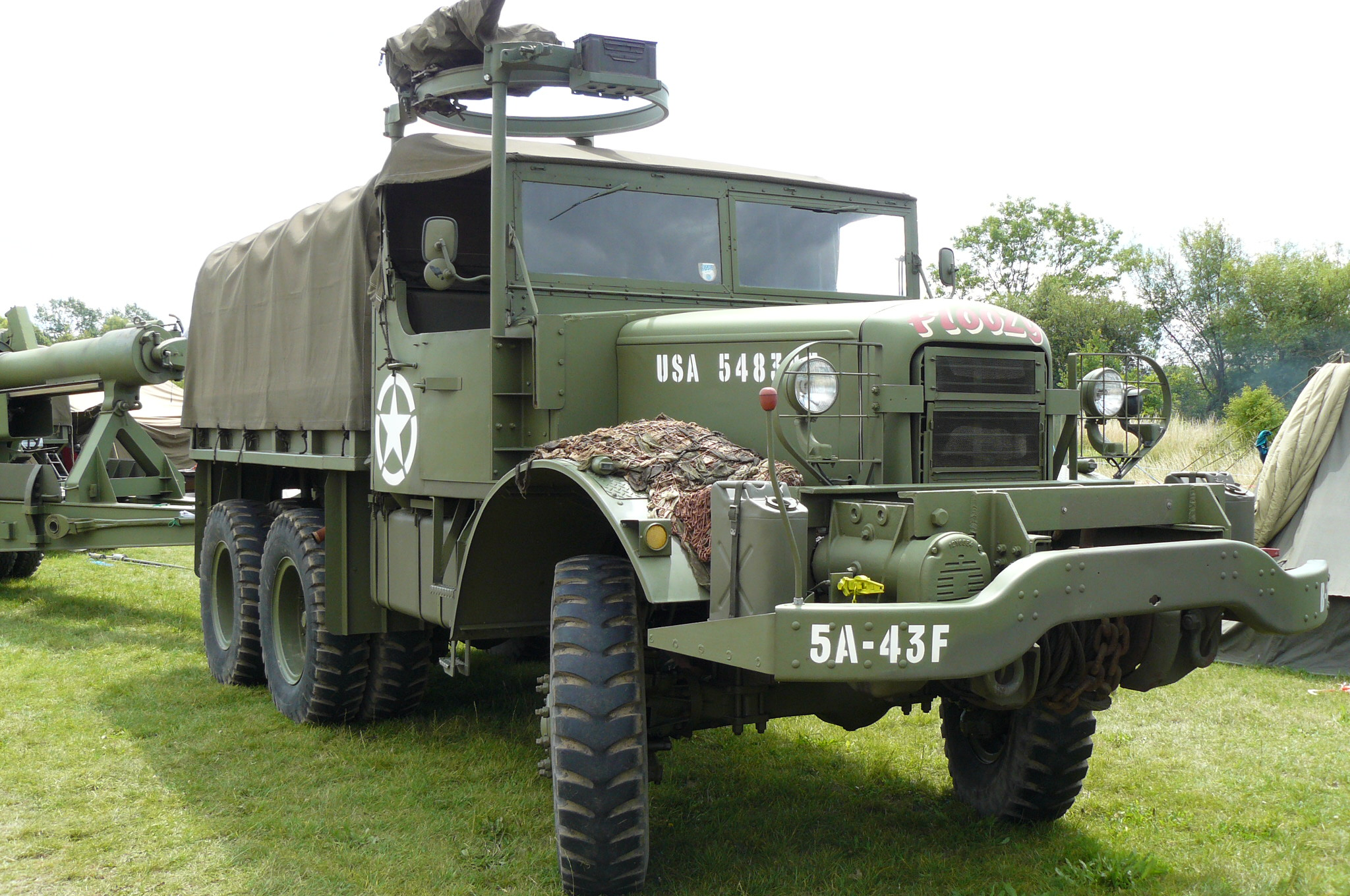
Mack NO artillery tractor

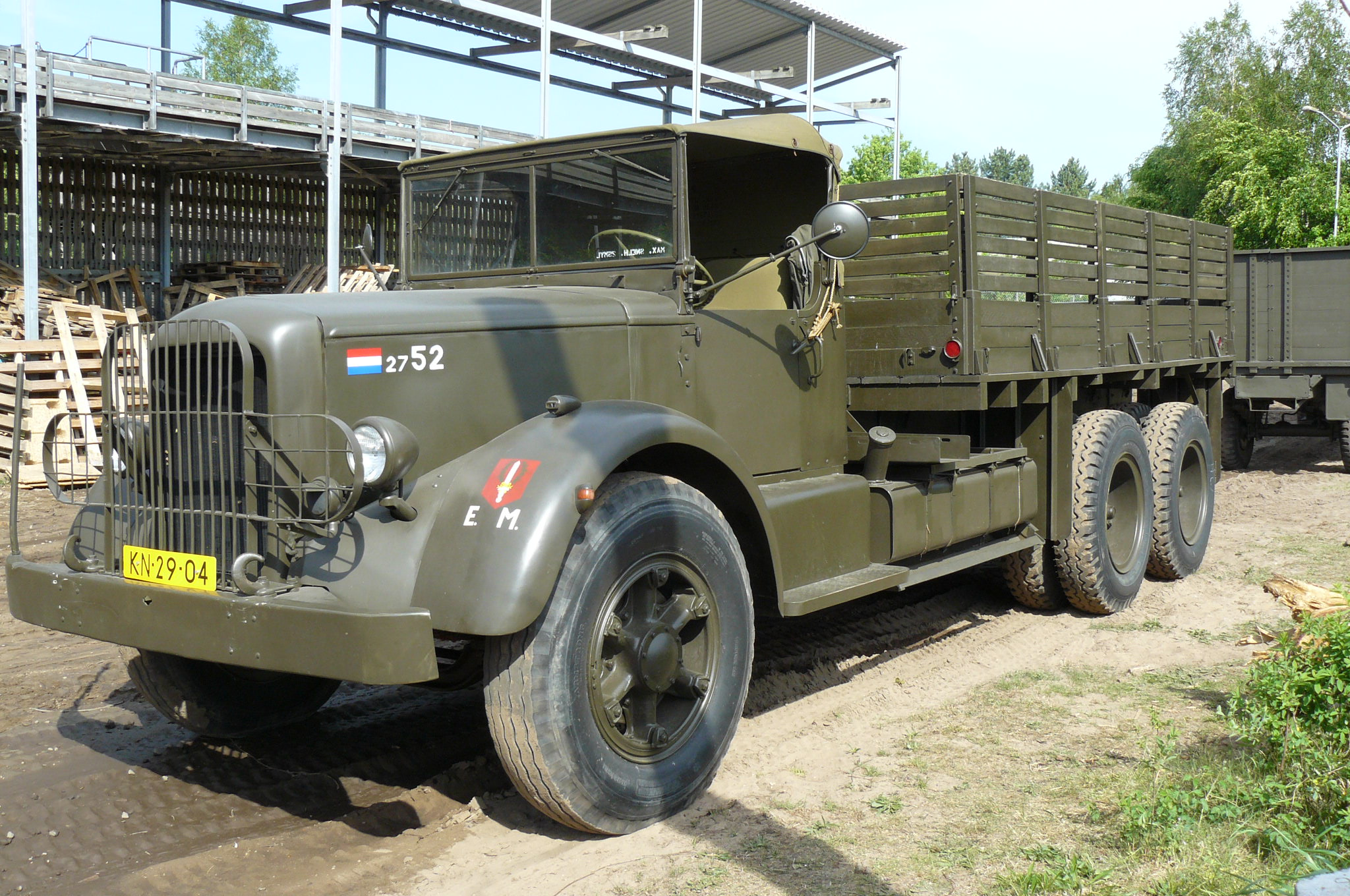
Mack NR

- NJ (G639)- 5-6 ton 4x2 COE 1941-1942
- NM (G535)- 6 ton 6x6 1940-1943
- NO (G532)- 7 1/2 ton 6x6 1943
- NR (G528)- 10 ton 6x4 1940-1945
- M52/54A1 (G744)- 5 ton 6x6 1962-1963 Re-powered with ENDT673
- M123/125 (G792)- 10 ton 6x6 1955-1958 Developed from NO

== Rail equipment ==
- ACR/ACX Series- 1916-1938 (with Brill bodies)
- FCD Model- 1954

== Early and pre-World War II truck and buses ==
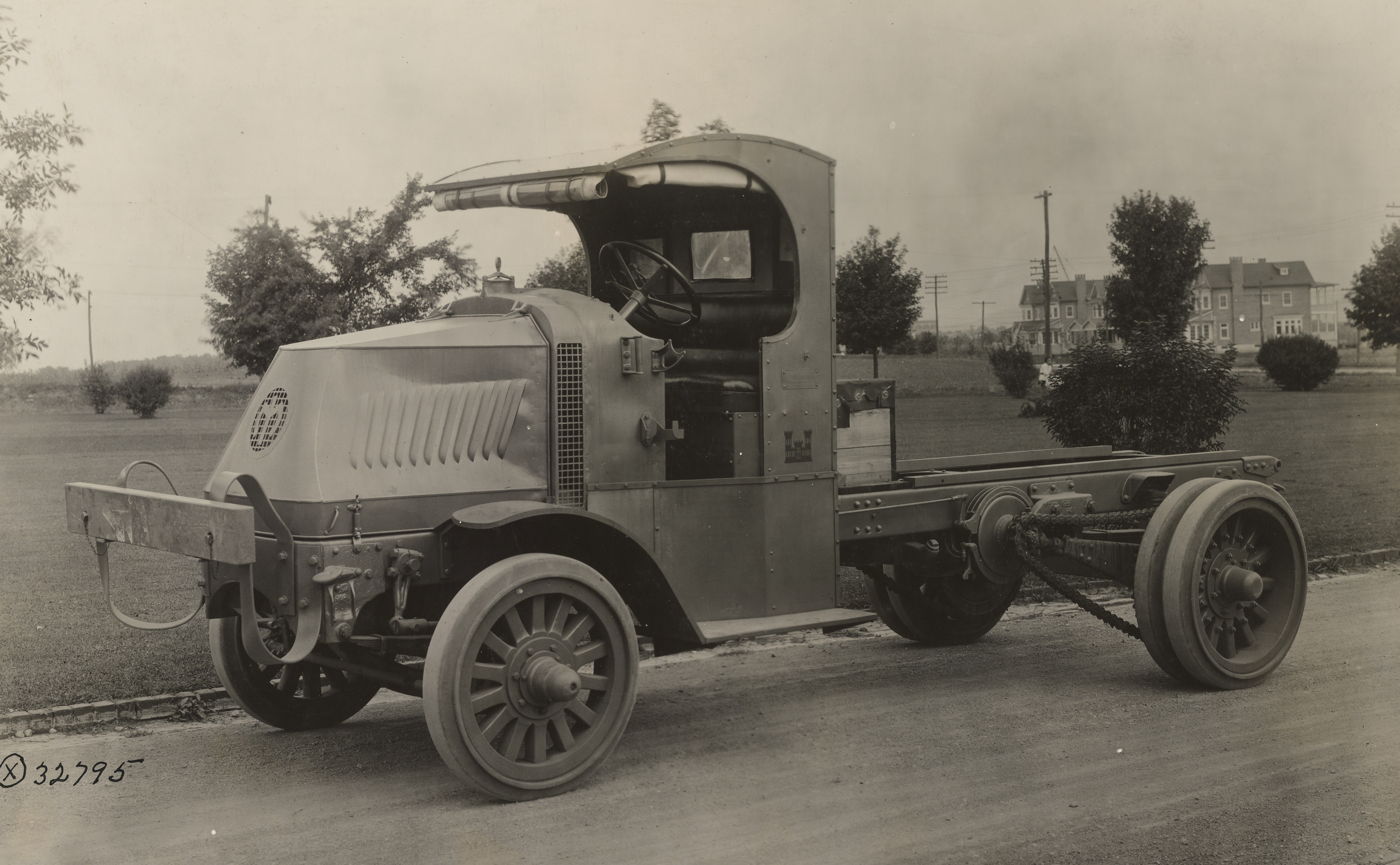
AC series 5,5 ton truck

- "Old # 1"- Bus 1900
- Manhattan Series- 1903
- Junior Series- 1909
- AB Series- 1914-1920
- AC Series- 1916-1939
- AK Series- 1928-193?, 3½–5 ton high speed carrier
- AP Series- 1926-1938
- Junior (II) Series- 1936-1938
- E Series- 1936-1951
- F Series- 1936-1942
- L Series- 1940-1948

== See also ==
- Mack Trucks
