= Mack MC/MR series =

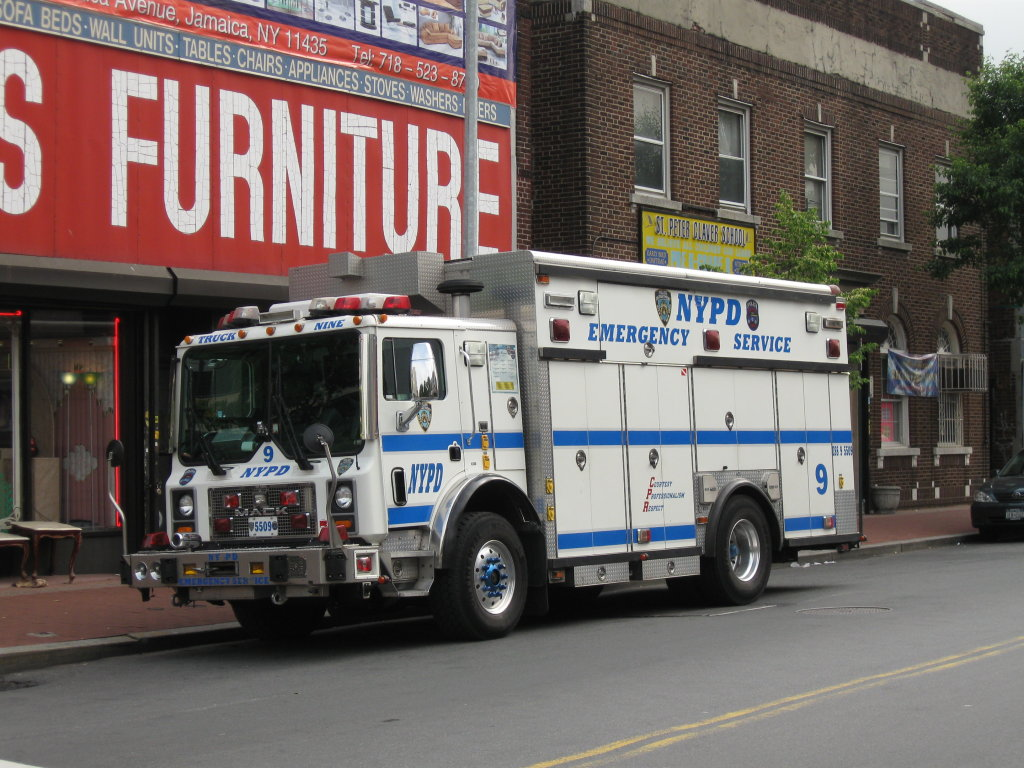

Overview
- Manufacturer: Mack Trucks
- Also called: Mack Cruise-Hauler
- Production: 1978-2007
- Model years: 1978-2007

Body and chassis
- Class: Class 6-8 Truck
- Body style: Truck cab over engine

Powertrain
- Engine: Mack E6; Mack E7; Caterpillar 3208
- Transmission: 5-7 speed Maxitorque (manual)

Dimensions
- Curb weight: 16,000-18,000 lbs

Chronology
- Successor: Mack TerraPro

The Mack MC/MR series, also known as the "Cruise-Hauler", is a cabover truck first introduced in 1978. It is of a distinct "set back front axle" design (first seen on the Mack FM), with the driver compartment mounted ahead of the front axle and with a large, flat, divided windscreen covering almost half of the truck's frontal aspect.

The MC was used for custom-built fire equipment, when Mack exited the market in 1990 they discontinued the MC. The MR was widely used in refuse applications and continued in production until up-graded as the MRU TerraPro in 2007.

== Design ==
The MC/MR was designed from the beginning to be available in right-hand drive as well as left-hand drive. This allowed Mack to market the truck in the United Kingdom without costly conversions, and also opened the trash truck market at home. The right-hand drive models also have the exhaust relocated to the left, while the turbocharger is mounted behind the engine so as to provide more space and less heat soak. Export models are coded MCE and MRE respectively. The low profile cab is of steel, while the doors are fibreglass. The engine intrudes considerably into the low cab. The cab tilts through a full 90 degrees, allowing for the radiator to be removed without first removing the cab. The dashboard is lit from a single source through fibreoptics, this being a very early example of such an application.

== Engines ==
The MC was available with Mack E6 series and mid-range Caterpillar 3208 series diesel engines. The MR was available with the E6 series and E7 series diesel engines.

Maxidyne high-torque engines have a wide power band and can develop maximum power below the governed speed they are rated at. This allows less shifting and smoother power "on the ground" when accelerating. Most MR series had Maxidyne engines.

The Mack E6 was a 672 cubic inches (11.0 L) turbocharged inline six-cylinder engine. it developed 200 to 350 horsepower (150 to 260 kW).

The Mack E7 was a 728 cubic inches (11.9 L) turbocharged inline six-cylinder engine. It 1998 it developed 300 to 370 horsepower (220 to 280 kW) and 120 to 1,480 pound force-feet (160 to 2,010 N⋅m) of torque.

The Caterpillar 3208 was a 636 cubic inches (10.4 L) V8 engine. It developed 175 to 210 horsepower (130 to 157 kW) and 400 to 485 pound force-feet (542 to 658 N⋅m) of torque.

== Transmissions ==
Mack, Allison, Fuller, and Spicer transmissions have been available, evolving over time. Each was suited for different applications.

All manual transmission except the 6-speed had a 5-speed transmission, additional speeds were made with combinations of ranges. The lowest transmission gear can be either an on-road or very low off-road ratio.

Mack Maxitorque transmissions are designed to work with Maxidyne engines and have fewer and wider-spaced gears than more conventional models. They originally had 5 speeds and developed into 8 speeds with low range gears. Other Mack manual transmissions have 5-10 speeds.

Allison automatic transmissions are widely used on refuse trucks. Early models had 4 or 5 speeds and evolved with 5 or 6 speeds. They are fully automatic planetary gear transmissions and later models have lock-up torque converters.

Fuller Roadranger transmissions are multi-range and suited for non-Maxidyne engines, which need more speeds. They had 10 highway speeds and an optional low range.

Spicer 5-speed transmissions were available in 400 series trucks.

Transfer cases are used on concrete pumps. They direct full transmission output to either the drive-line or the pump, but not both at the same time.

== Axles and suspensions ==
Front axles were rated at 10,500 or 12,000 pounds (4,800 or 5,400 kg) in light MC models but most models had between 12,000 to 20,000 pounds (5,400 to 9,100 kg). Steering could have up to a 45 cut, allowing very tight turning radius.

Single rear axles rated at 18,500 pounds (8,400 kg) were used in small MC models, but most were 23,000 pounds (10,000 kg) and later MR models could be up to 30,000 pounds (14,000 kg).

The Camelback tandem is the base rear suspension. The Camelback has multiple leaves that rock above the bogey pivot then curve down and under the axles. It is strong in on/off-road service. It is available in ratings of 38,000, 44,000, 52,000, and 65,000 pounds (17,000, 20,000, 24,000, and 29,000 kg).

Walking beams have low bogie pivots with a balance beam going out and under the axles. Any suspension is above the bogey pivot. They can have leaf springs or be solidly mounted. Walking beams are very stable at low speeds and when stopped.

== Applications ==
=== Refuse ===
Front loaders drive directly up to a container. A boom goes from the body over and then down in front of, the cab. As the truck moves forward slowly two forks pick up the container. The container is then lifted up and over the cab to be dumped into a hopper on the top of the body. Front loaders are used for commercial pickup.

Rear loaders have a large hopper on the rear end. Typically a rear crew can load loose material, bins with assist, oversize pieces, and small containers. They are used for residential and light commercial pickup in congested cities.

Roll-off container trucks have a container that is raised in the front and slides off the back of the truck onto the ground. When a loaded box is carried it can be unloaded like a dump truck. They commonly haul construction debris but refuse containers are also left at commercial sites. MC/MRs are sometimes used in congested cities when extreme maneuverability is required.

=== Construction ===
Concrete pumps have a multi-stage folding boom pivoted near the center of the truck and a hopper at the rear to load the pump. The pump itself is the load and the truck always operates at maximum weight. In transit the boom is folded front to rear. In use the pump uses outriggers and the boom unfolds forward over the cab or to either side. Large pumps can have multiple extra axles.

Concrete conveyors have a telescopic conveyor belt. They do similar work to a pump but are limited and rarely as heavy as a pump.

Roll-off container trucks have a container that is raised in the front and slides off the back of the truck onto the ground. When a loaded box is carried it can be unloaded like a dump truck. They commonly haul construction debris but refuse and garbage containers are also left at commercial sites.

=== Snow plowing ===
The Metropolitan Transportation Authority in New York has snowplow models.

=== Fire and emergency vehicles ===
The MC chassis was popular for fire equipment, when it was discontinued the MR was used for emergency equipment but is not used for fire equipment.

=== Cargo and semi-tractors ===
MC models were meant primarily for cargo and semi-tractors used in congested conditions. When these markets ended the MC was discontinued while the heavier MR remained in production.

== Gallery ==
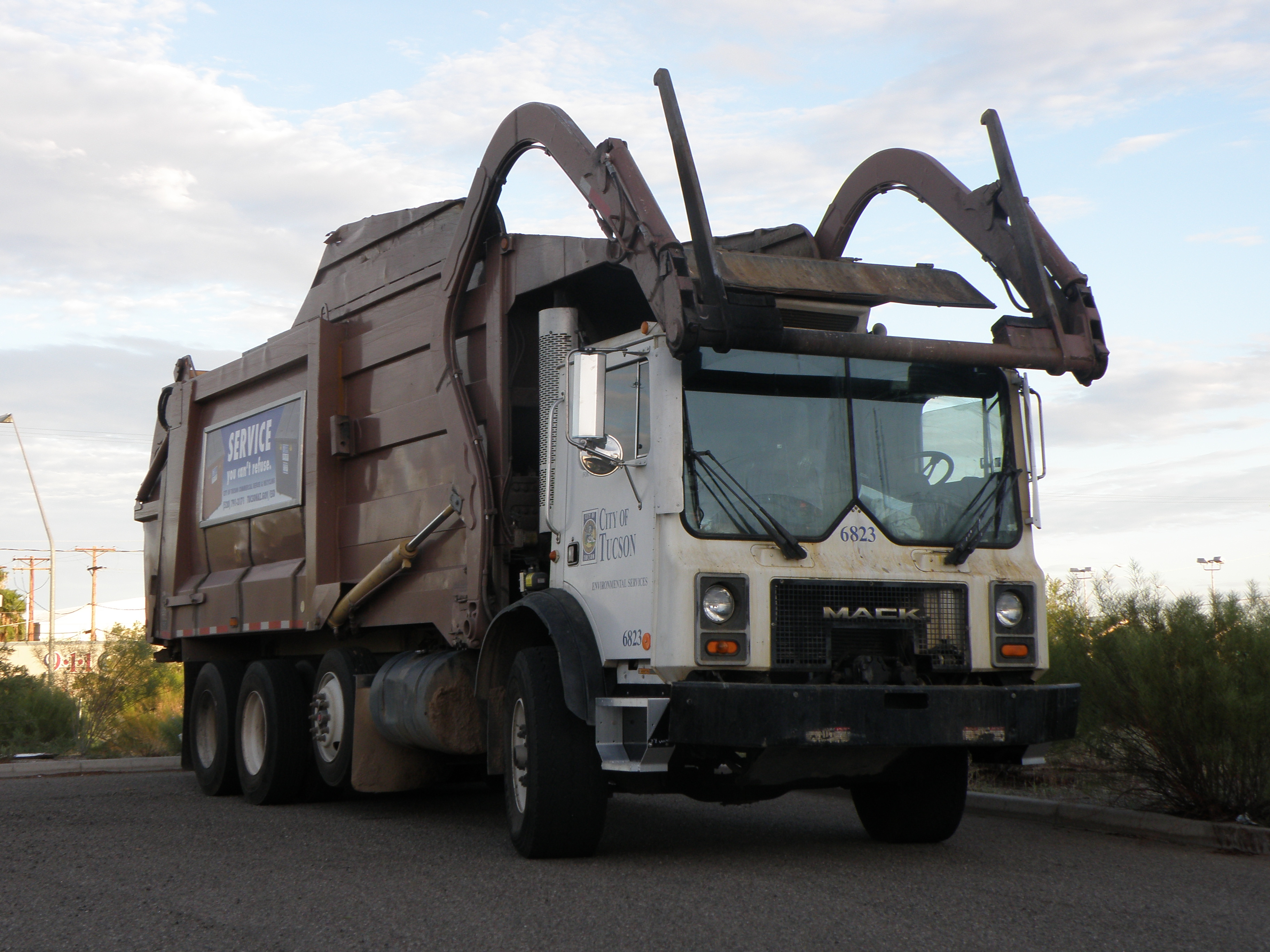
Front loading refuse truck

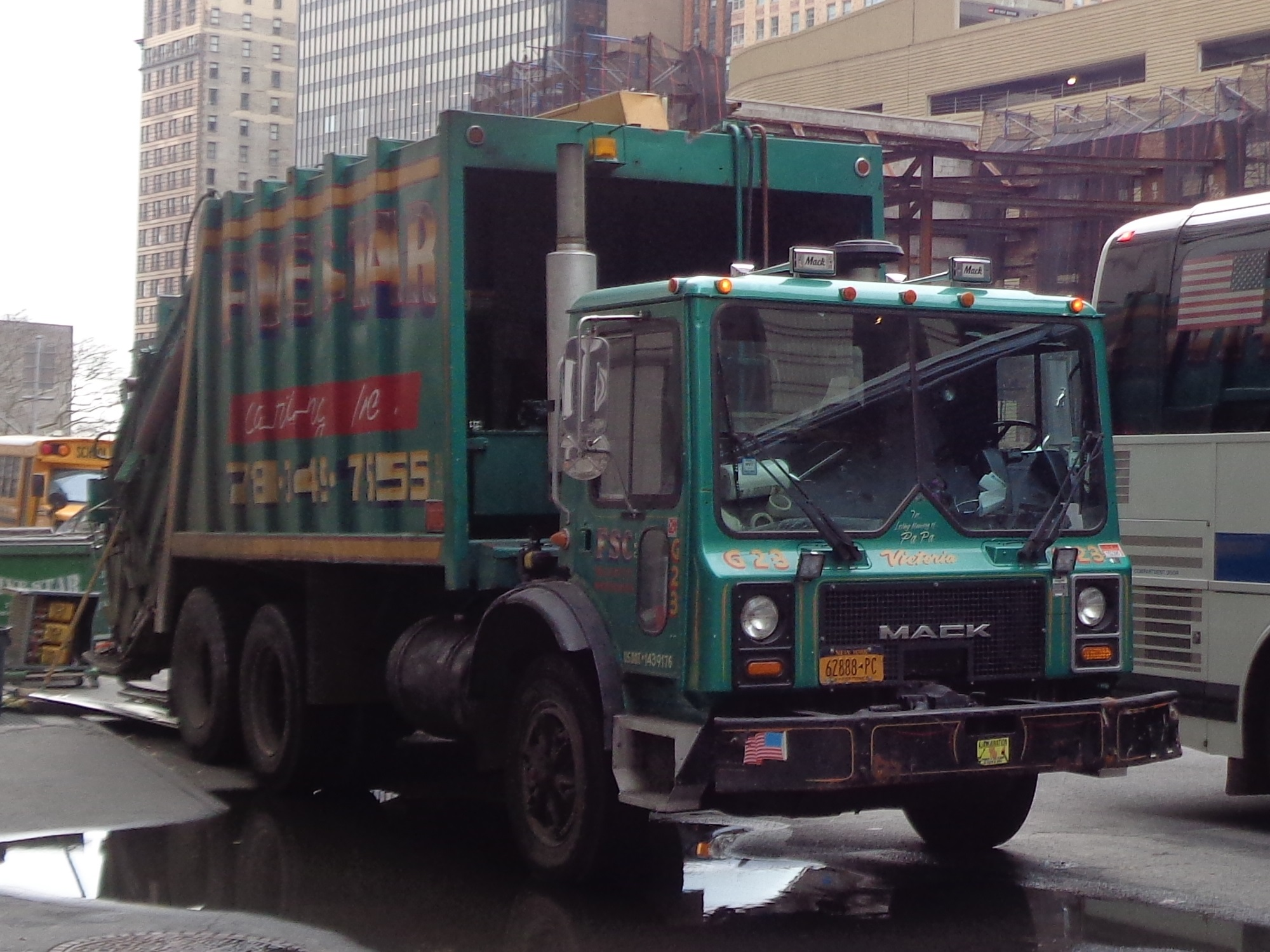
Rear loading refuse truck

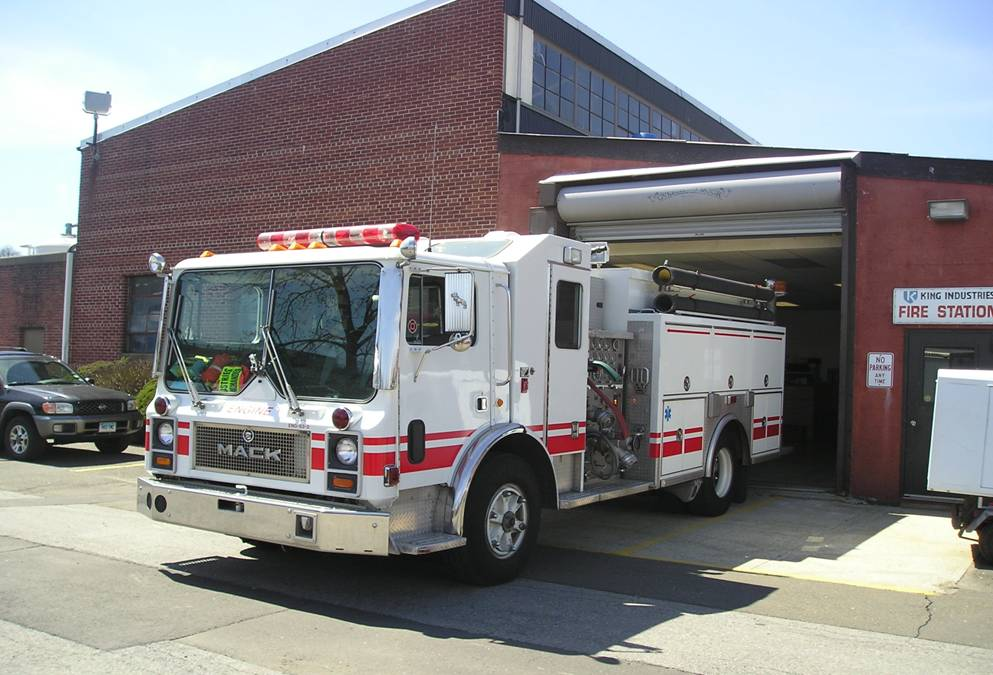
Fire engine

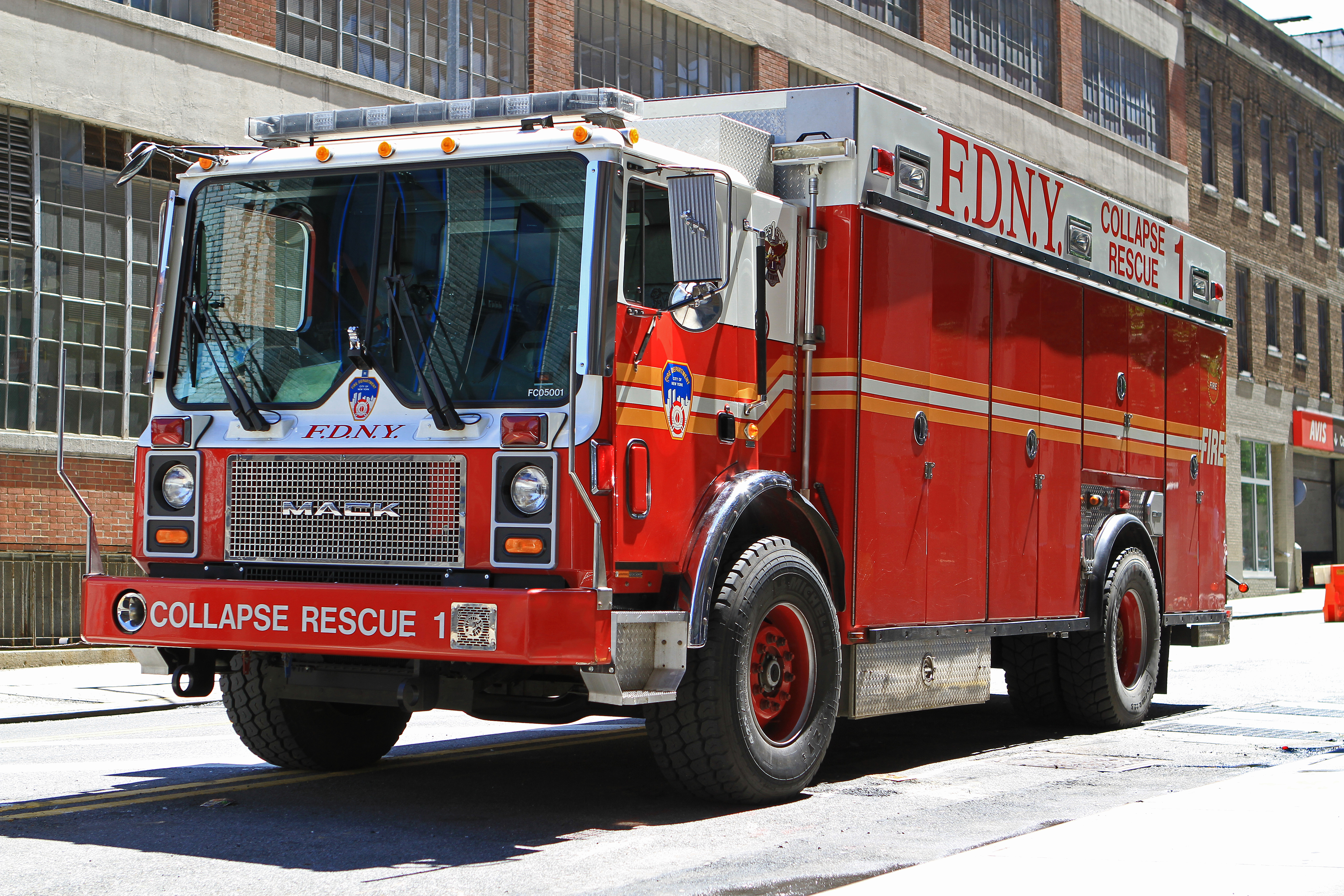
Fire department rescue truck

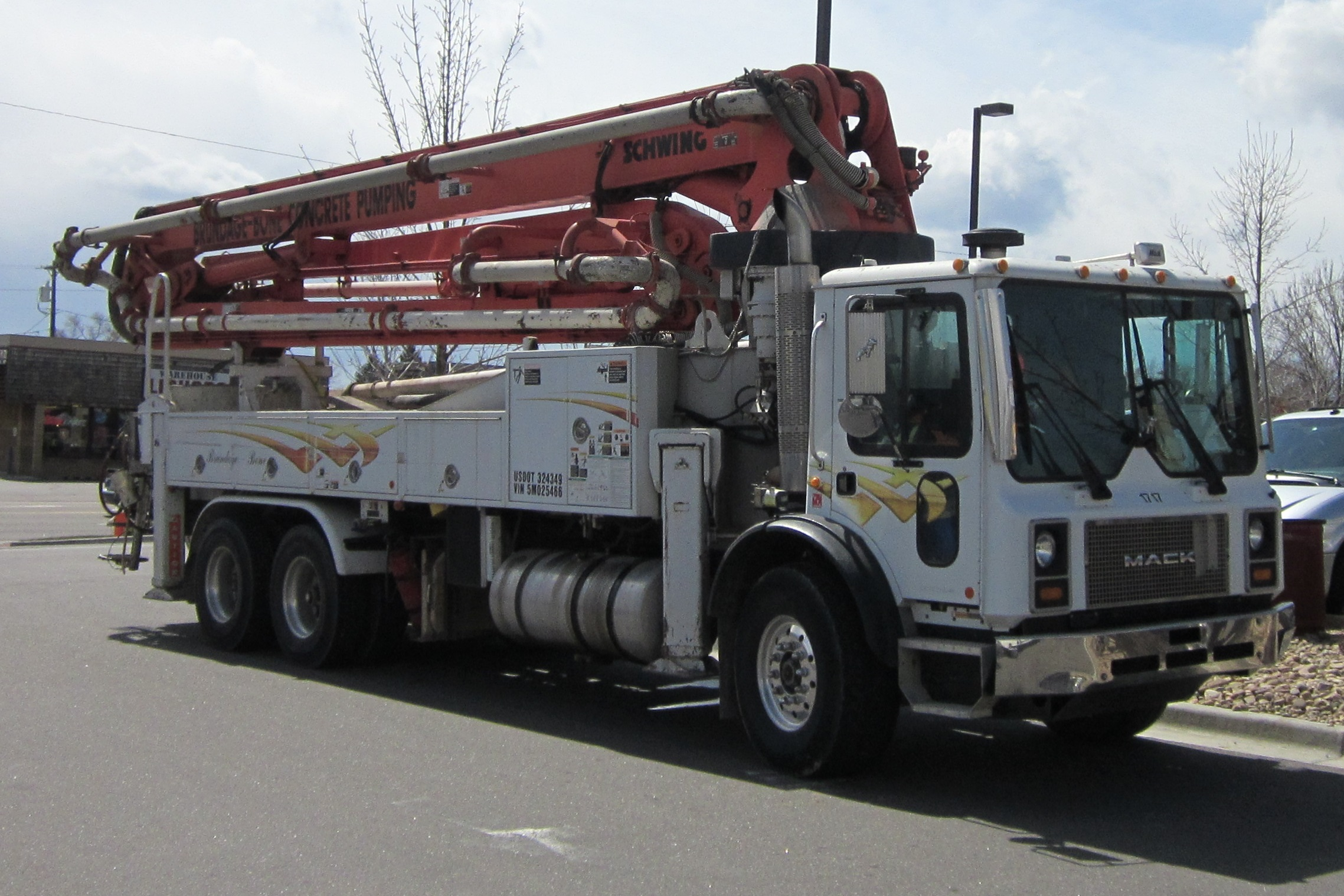
Concrete pump

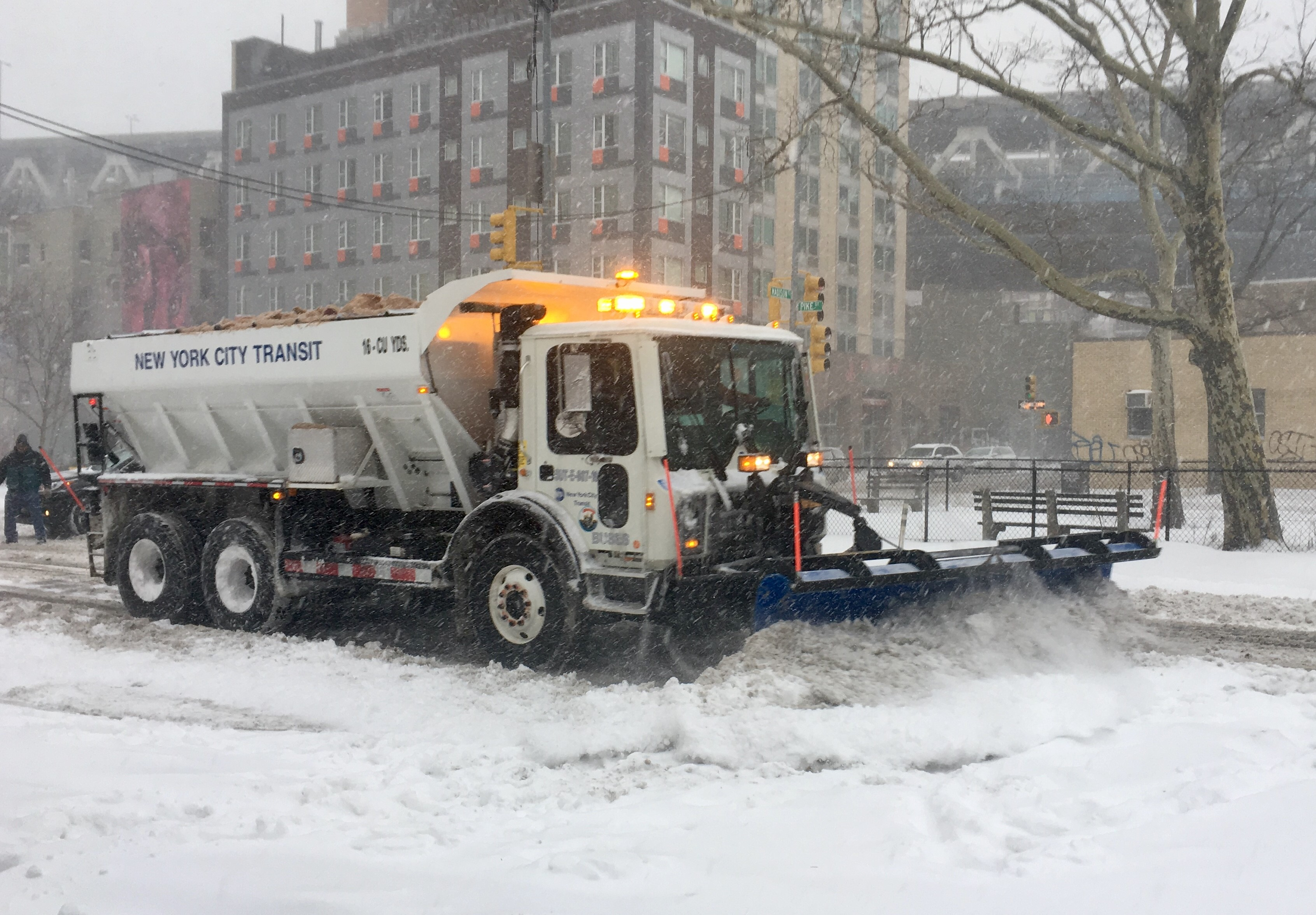
Snow plow

== See also ==
- Mack Trucks
- List of Mack Trucks Products
