= Dumpster =

Type of mobile garbage bin

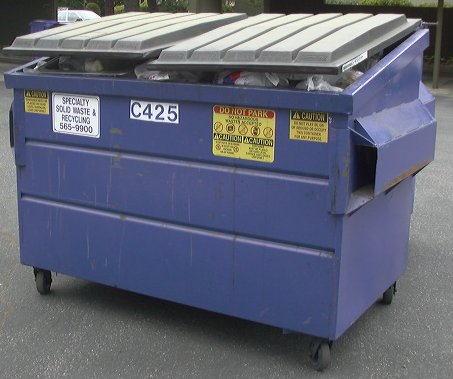
Dumpster awaiting pick-up

A dumpster is a movable waste container designed to be brought and taken away by a special collection vehicle, or to a bin that a specially designed garbage truck lifts, empties into its hopper, and lowers, on the spot. The word is a genericized trademark of Dumpster, an American brand name for a specific design. Generic usage of skip, or wheelie bin may be used in other English speaking countries.

== History ==
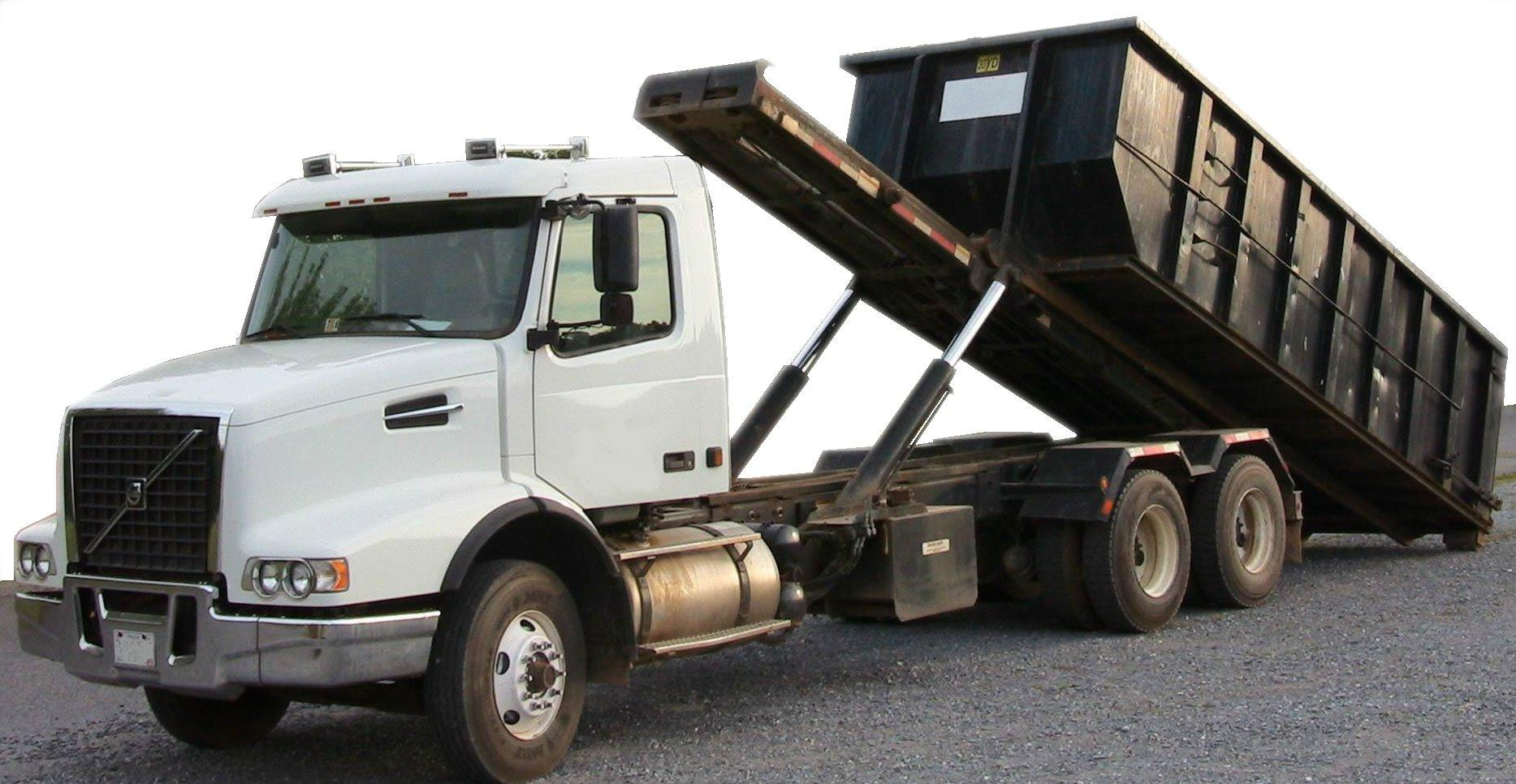
Roll-off container

The word "dumpster", first used commercially in 1936, came from the Dempster-Dumpster system of mechanically loading the contents of standardized containers onto garbage trucks, which was patented by Dempster Brothers in 1935. The containers were called Dumpsters, a blending of the company's name with the word dump. The Dempster Dumpmaster became the first successful front-loading garbage truck that used this system.

The word dumpster has had at least three trademarks associated with it by Dempster Brothers, but today it is often used as a genericized trademark. All three trademarks have since either been expired or canceled.

A dumpster is sometimes considered synonymous with a skip. However, there are functional differences between them. A skip is intended to be loaded onto a vehicle and transported to another location. Dumpsters, in contrast, have their contents emptied into a special vehicle, and are seldom moved from their locations.

== Function ==
A dumpster is unloaded by a front-loading garbage truck

The main purpose of a dumpster is to store garbage until it is emptied by a garbage truck for disposal. Dumpsters can be used for all kinds of waste, or for recycling purposes.

Most dumpsters are emptied by front-loading garbage trucks. These trucks have large prongs on the front which are aligned and inserted into arms or slots on the dumpster. Hydraulics lift the prongs and the dumpster, eventually flipping the dumpster upside-down and emptying its contents into the garbage truck's hopper (storage compartment). Other dumpsters are smaller and are emptied by rear-loading trucks. Dumpsters are typically emptied outside of peak traffic hours. The frequency at which dumpsters are emptied varies from community to community, often ranging from daily to weekly, depending on the volume of trash generated.

== Types ==
Many businesses, apartment buildings, schools, offices, and industrial sites have one or more dumpsters, generally ranging from 0.5 to 8 cubic yards (0.38 to 6.12 m^{3}), to store the waste that they generate.

Waste storage containers can be made from a wide variety of materials, including steel and fiberglass. Plastic dumpsters became available in the 1970s.

In the United States, 96-US-gallon (0.36 m^{3}) dumpsters (also known as "roll carts" or "toters") are used by small businesses and homes where a normal bin would be too small, but a regular dumpster would be too large. These are emptied by rear-loading trucks or by side-loading trucks purpose-built for emptying roll carts of this and smaller sizes.

Roll-offs, sometimes called roll-off dumpsters or containers or open-top dumpsters or containers, are larger dumpster trailers ranging from 10 to 45 cubic yards (7.6 to 34.4 m^{3}) and are used at demolition sites, clean-outs, renovations, construction sites, factories, and large businesses. These containers are normally carried by very large trucks with hydraulic arms which load and unload the containers with ease, thus allowing these trucks to place these containers in a relatively unobtrusive position.

Roll-off dumpsters are available in a variety of sizes to fit different situations. The size needed will generally depend on three factors: volume of material, type of material, and location or placement of the dumpster. For example, heavy materials like bricks or stones should be placed in smaller dumpsters so the loaded container does not exceed weight limits for transportation.

== Dumpster diving ==
Dumpster diving involves persons voluntarily climbing into a dumpster to find valuables, such as discarded metal scrap, or simply useful items, including food and used clothing. It can also be a method of investigation (e.g., looking for discarded financial records, private papers, or evidence of a crime). Going through garbage containers that are not strictly speaking dumpsters is nevertheless often referred to as dumpster diving.

== Dempster Brothers ==
Dempster Brothers, Inc. of Knoxville, Tennessee, was an industrial firm that made waste collection vehicles including the Dempster Dumpmaster and Dempster Dinosaur. The firm was originally established by George Roby Dempster with his brothers Thomas and John Dempster.

The company is notable for popularizing the word dumpster in the United States, which eventually became a generic trademark.

== Dempster Dumpmaster ==
The Dempster Dumpmaster, introduced in the 1950s, was the first commercially successful, front-loading garbage truck in the United States. The product uses the Dempster-Dumpster system of mechanically emptying standardized metal containers, which had been patented by the company in 1937. It had arms at the front that picked up a dumpster and lifted it over the cab to tip it into the hopper. A rearward-traveling compacting panel compressed the garbage stored in the truck and was also used to push it out through a door at the back when it was being emptied.

== Gallery ==
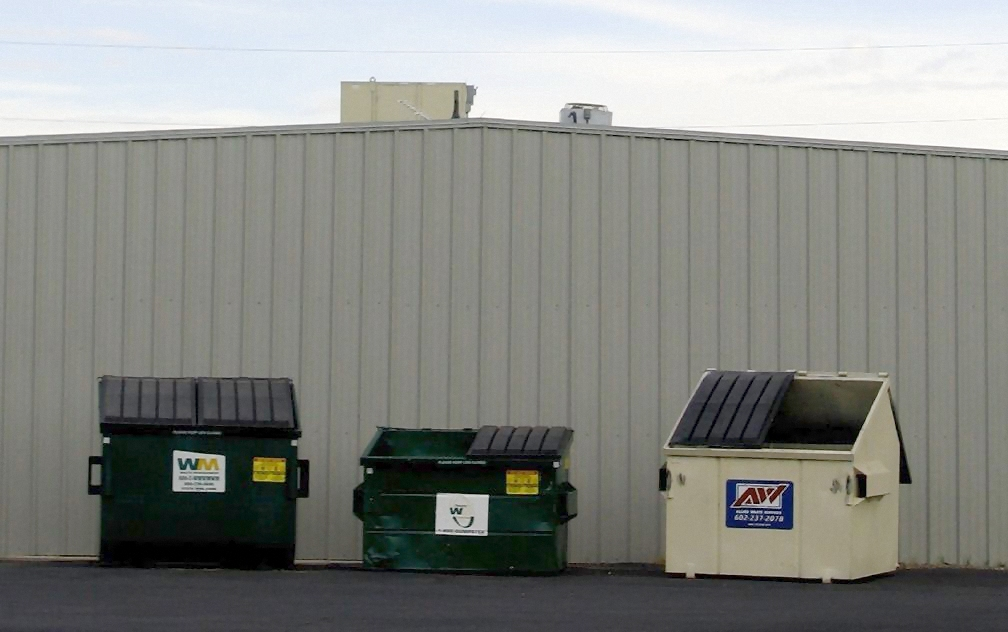
Three dumpsters in various sizes

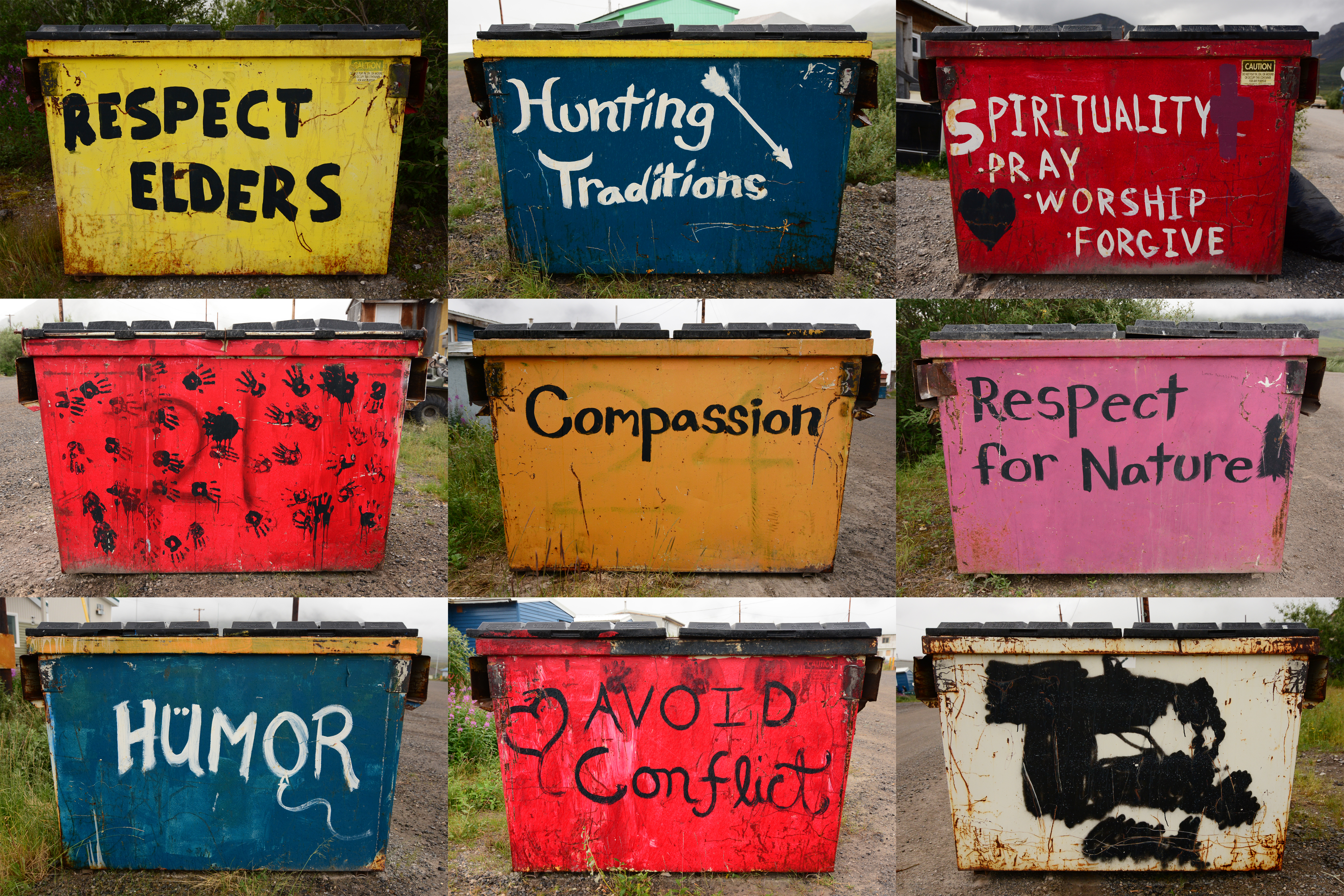
Colorfully decorated dumpsters in Anaktuvuk Pass, Alaska

== See also ==
- Garbage truck
- Dumpster diving
- Dumpster fire
- Roll-off
- Shipping container
- Skip (container)
- Waste
- Waste container
- Waste management
- Garwood Load Packer
