= Mack Titan =

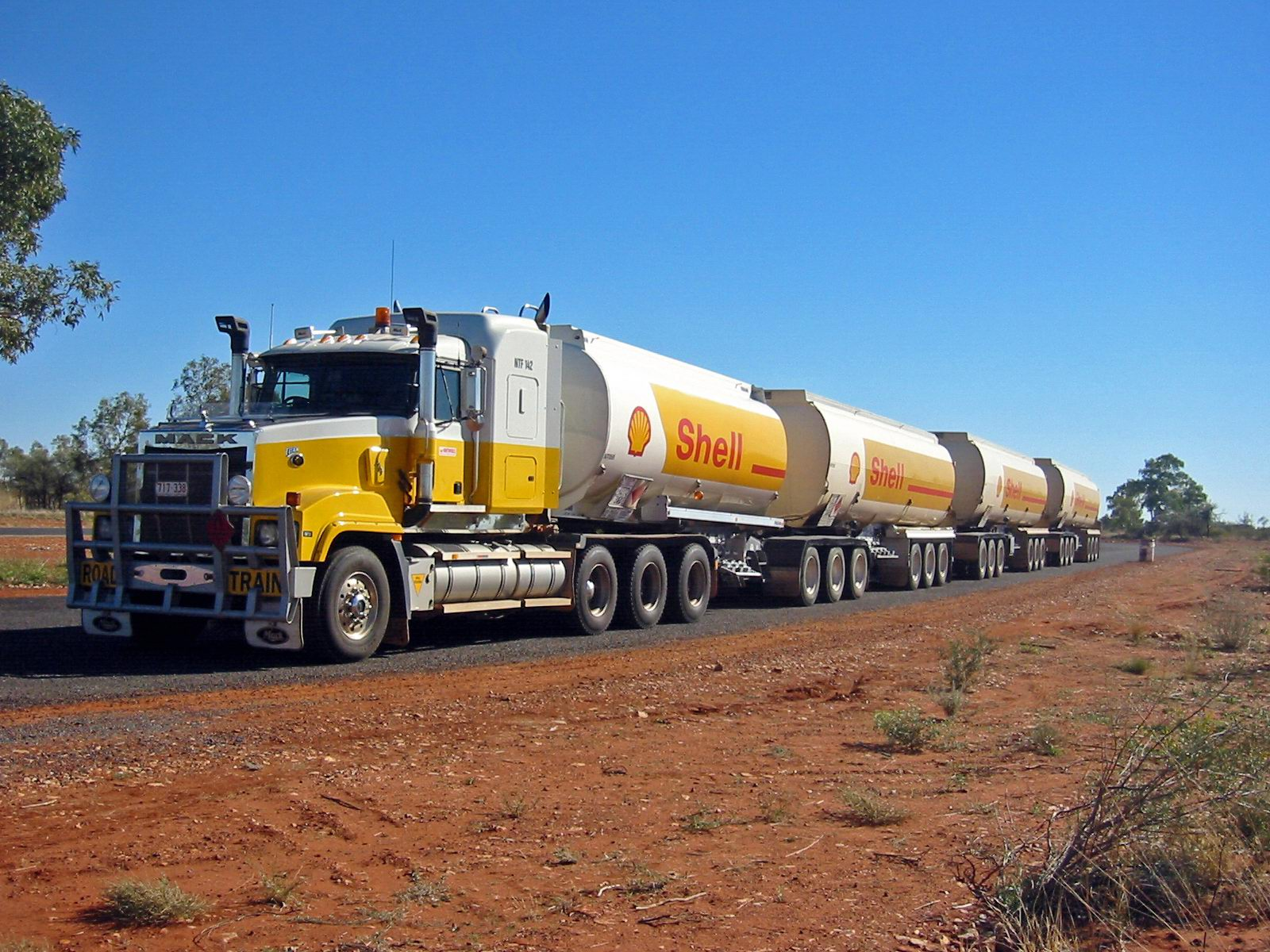

Overview
- Manufacturer: Mack Trucks
- Production: 1995–present (Australia); 2008–2017 (North America)
- Assembly: Wacol, Queensland; Macungie, Pennsylvania

Body and chassis
- Class: Class 8 truck
- Body style: Conventional (bonneted cab)

Powertrain
- Engine: Mack, Cummins, Caterpillar and Volvo
- Transmission: Mack, Eaton (manual)

The Mack Titan is a heavy-duty truck produced by Mack Trucks. Two variants are produced: one for the Australian market, introduced in 1995 aimed at heavy road train operators, and a 2008 version introduced in North America. The Titan can haul loads up to 200 tonnes GCWR and comes with many heavy-duty options that are not usually found on highway trucks.

== Australia ==
- A raised cab and taller hood allows for larger radiators for improved engine cooling in the hot Australian climates.
- Heavy duty double and triple frame rails handle the high loads and stress of driving on unpaved dirt roads.
- Rear axles offered include tri-drive options and planetary hub reduction axles from Renault Trucks.
- Air brake system has high flow air compressor and large air tanks to provide air for 2 or more trailers and the air starter (if fitted).
- Integrated vertical air intake snorkels keep dust and dirt out of the filters prolonging their life.
- High power engines from Cummins (ISX & Signature) and Caterpillar (C-16). Until 2000/2001, the Mack 16.4 litre E9 V8 was offered at 455 kW (610 hp) and 2,780 N⋅m (2,050 ft⋅lbf) of torque.
- The Mack 18 speed transmission is standard, with an Eaton 18 speed option. Eaton two and four speed auxiliary transmissions are also available to provide extra gears and an optional Power Tower.

== United States ==
In March 2008, Titan was introduced in Bulldog magazine. The target markets are the heavy-haul applications of: construction, logging, mining, oil field, and heavy equipment hauling. A Heavy Duty model uses the 16-litre big-block MP10, the largest ever 6-cylinder engine from Mack, with 515, 565, and 605 horsepower (451 kW) models. The 605 has a torque rating of 2,060 ft⋅lbf (2,790 N⋅m) at 1,200 rpm.

It will replace the now retired CL model which served as Mack's "big bore" truck which was powered by the Cummins ISX. It will feature the MP10 which is Mack's version of the Volvo D16C. In mid 2017 the Mack Titan was discontinued for sale in the US.

== See also ==
- Mack Trucks
- List of Mack Trucks Products
