= Skip (container) =

Type of waste container

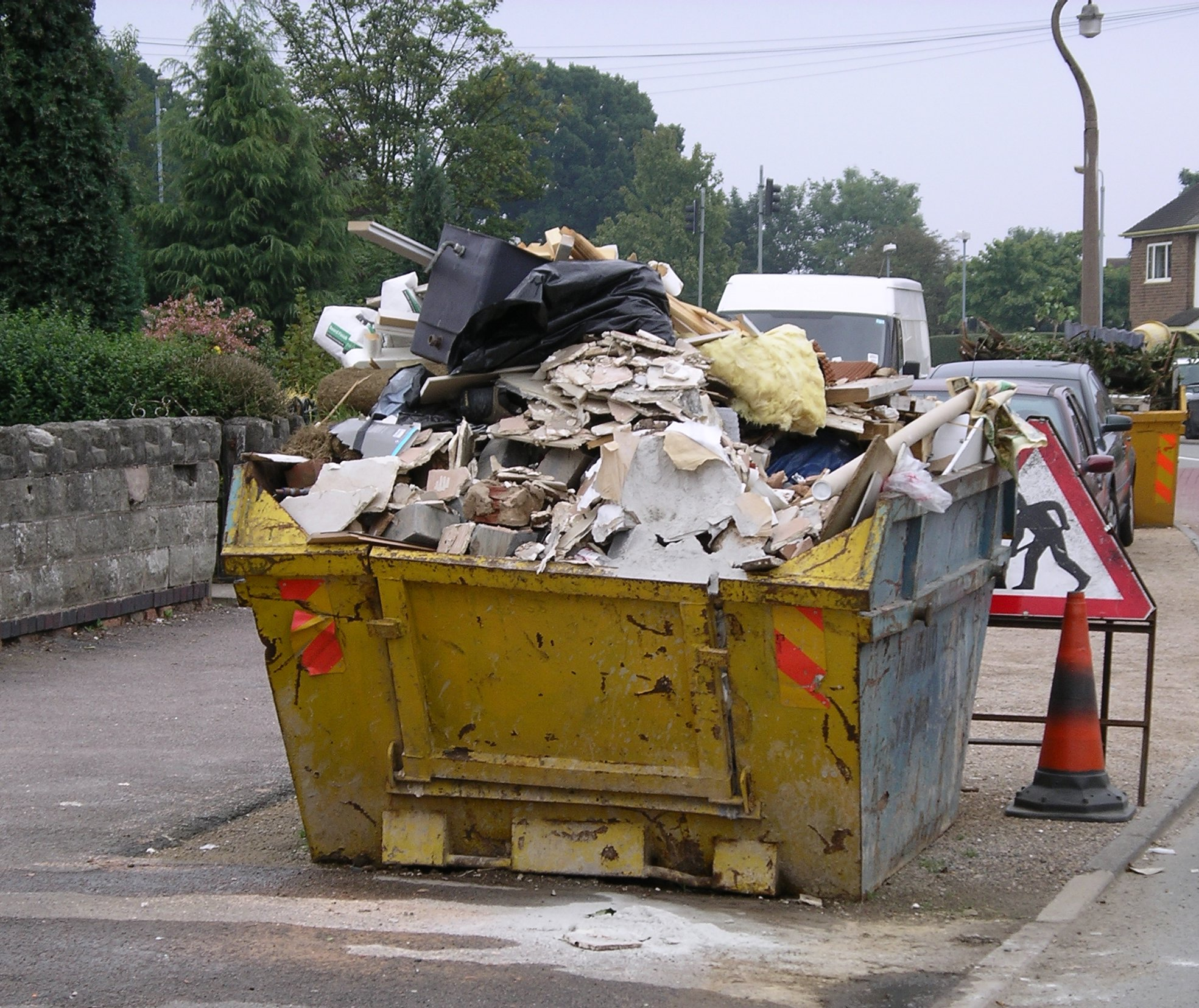
An overfilled skip

A cantilever skip truck loads a skip

A skip (British English, Australian English, Hiberno-English and New Zealand English), or skip bin, is a large open-topped waste container designed for loading onto a special type of lorry called a skip truck. Typically, skip bins have a distinctive shape: the longitudinal cross-section of the skip bin is either a trapezium or two stacked trapezia. The lower trapezium has the smaller edge at the bottom of the skip bin, and a longer edge at the top. The smaller edge on either end is lower which makes it easier to load. Where there is an upper trapezium, it has the smaller edge at the top. There is a sloping floor or wall at each end. There are usually two lugs on each side of the bin onto which chains can be attached, permitting the heavy skip to be lifted onto and off a skip lorry or skip truck. A special skip-carrying lorry or crane is used.

One end of the skip sometimes has a large door that hinges down to allow manual loading and unloading, these skips are called 'drop-door skips'. Skips are usually durable and tough, made to withstand rough use by tradespeople and labourers. The size of skip bins can vary greatly depending on their use, with sizes ranging from small 2 cubic yards (1.5 m^{3}) mini-skips to the very large 40 cubic yards (31 m^{3}) roll-on/roll-off skips. Even though these large bins can store many tons of waste, most lorries are limited to carrying around 7.5 tons of material in the container.

Salvaging usable goods discarded in skips, a practice sometimes called dumpster diving, has a following among anti-waste activists.

== Types ==
There are several types of skip containers:

- Open skips allow easier loading of waste materials and are commonly found on construction sites.
- Closed skips are more secure and prevent unauthorized use. They ensure that the volume of waste does not exceed the maximum limit.
- Roll-on/roll-off (RORO) skips are similar to open skips, but instead of being lifted onto a skip loader wagon by chains, they are rolled onto a wagon with a hook. They are more common as industrial containers and are not suitable for domestic use (see: roll-off).
- Mobile skip bins are usually set on a trailer with four wheels. A lifting mechanism is used to load and unload the skip from the trailer.

== Uses ==
Skip truck in operation

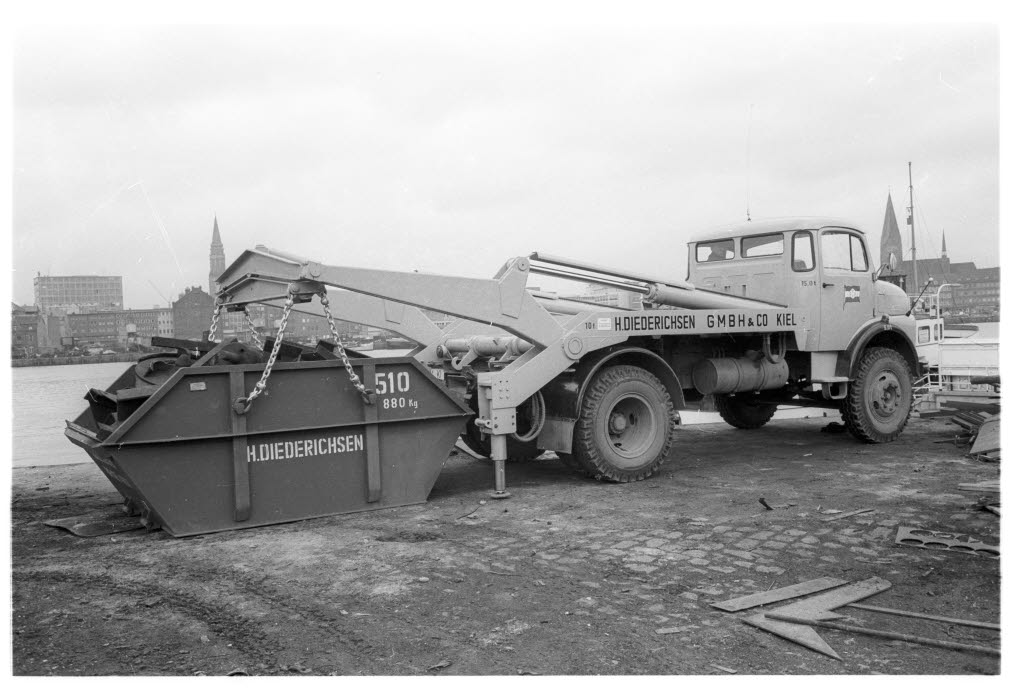
Moving to the skip

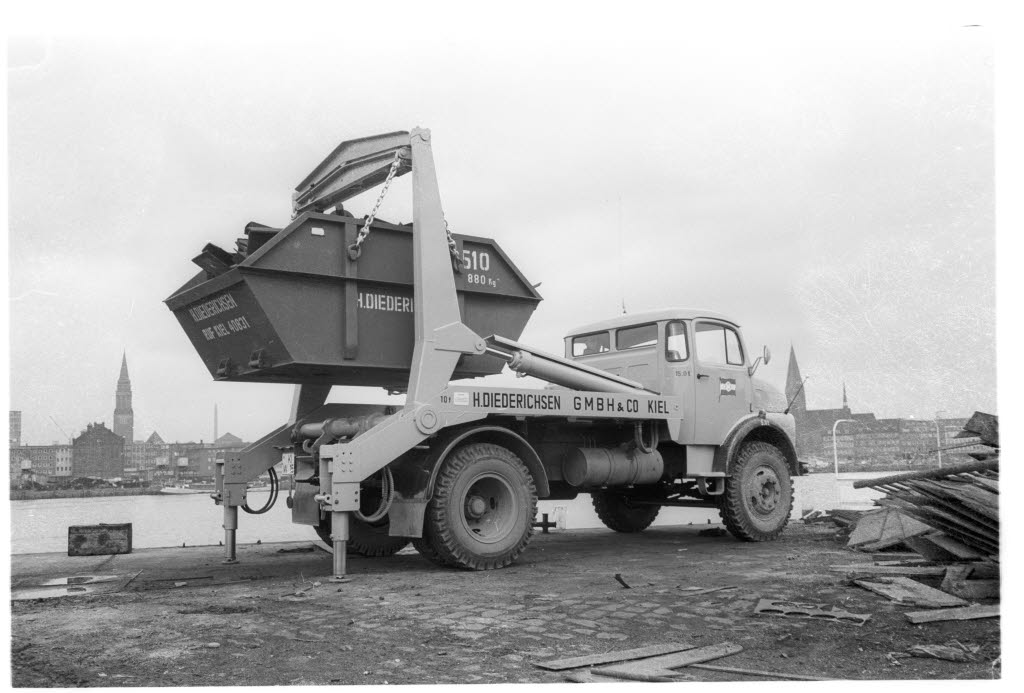
Lifting the skip

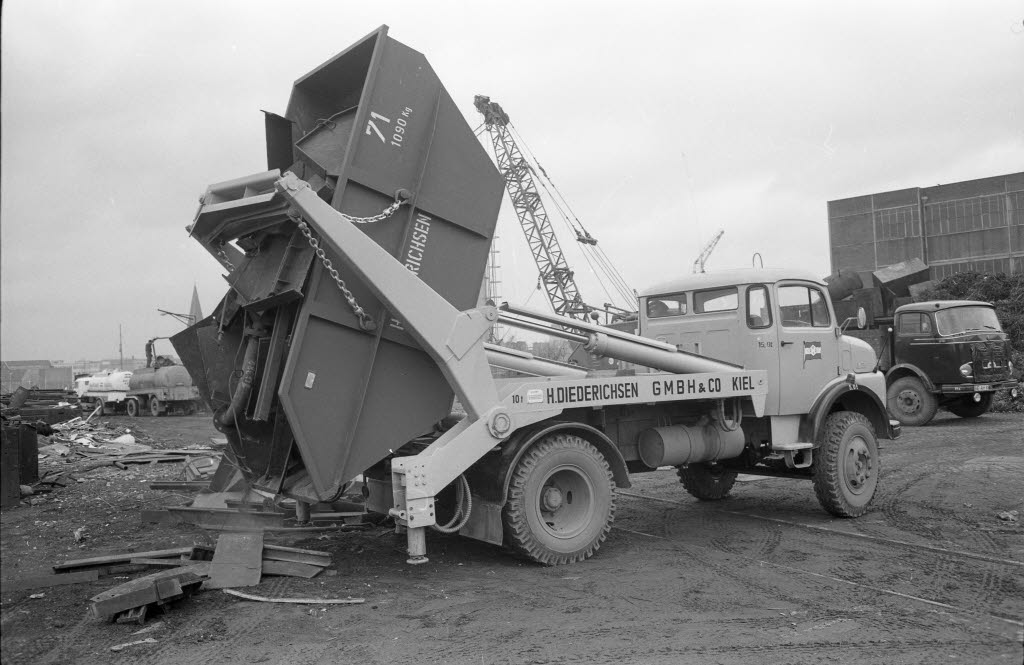
Emptying the skip

Skips are commonly used to hold open-topped loads of construction and demolition waste, garden waste or other waste and litter types. The construction debris may originate from a building, renovation, or demolition site; building supplies can be delivered to a site in a skip that is later used to remove waste. Skips are also used for various cleaning-out jobs that need much material to be taken away, and at factories producing large quantities of scrap metal. The material in the skip may be taken to a landfill, recycled or recovered/disposed of in some other way. There are wide range of uses of skip bins including construction building, home renovations, handyman maintenance or repair projects, garden or green clean up.

Skip hire companies typically print 'level fill' on the sides of skips to instruct users that the contents should not fill or have contents showing above the height of the sides of the skip. This is a safety requirement, enforced by the DVSA, to ensure that the skip is safe for transportation. If the content overtops the skip, it may slip off during transport and become dangerous. Many tradesmen and builders will make use of what are termed 'greedy boards', old doors and other scrap sheet based material, to artificially heighten the sides of the skip and thus get more value for money out of their skip hire. If they do that, the skip bin hire provider will charge them an extra fee as the skip will be classed as overloaded.

== Etymology ==
The origins of skip (most often found in Australia, New Zealand and the UK) come from the word skep, used to refer to a basket. Skep itself comes from the Late Old English sceppe, from the Old Norse skeppa 'basket'. While the first recorded use of a rubbish skip dates back to 1922, the practice of using skips to dispose of residential and commercial waste became mainstream over the following century, culminating in the modern skip waste disposal system that is used today.

== See also ==
- Dumpster
- Dumpster diving
- Shipping container
- Skip wagon, a train car
- Waste container (dustbin, etc.)
- Waste management
