= Mack TerraPro =

Type of heavy-duty service truck

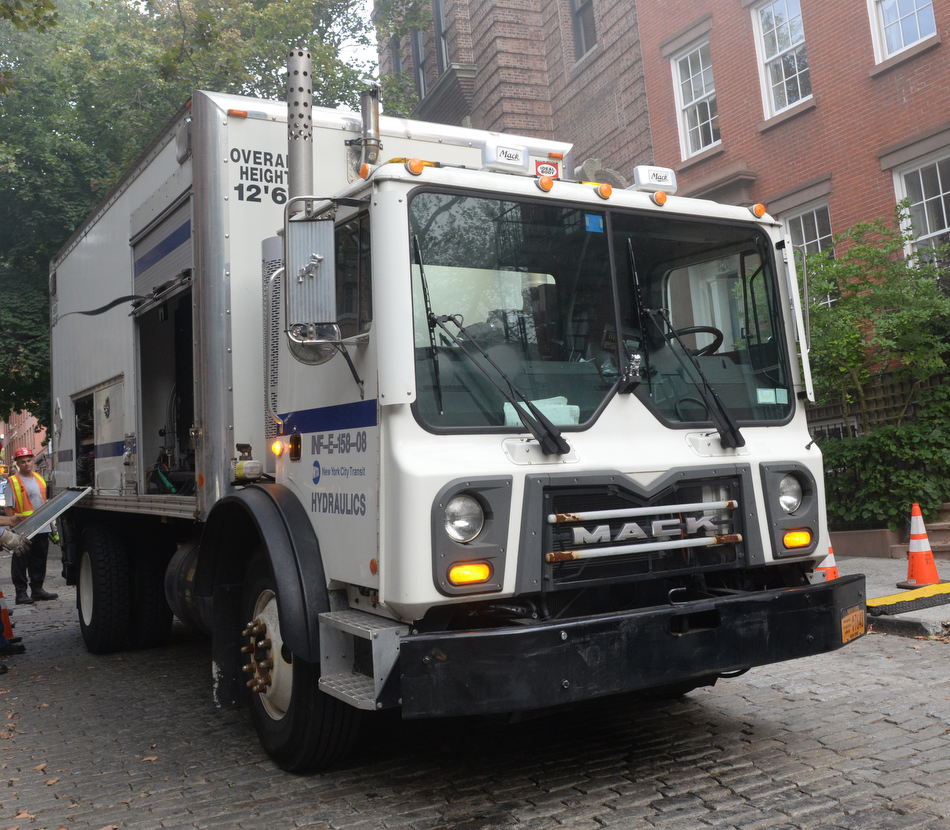

Overview
- Manufacturer: Mack Trucks
- Production: 2007-present
- Model years: 2007-2026

Body and chassis
- Class: Class 8 heavy duty and severe-service vocational truck
- Body style: Cab-over-engine (COE)
- Layout: 4x2, 6x4, 8x4, 10x4, 10x6, 12x6

Powertrain
- Engine: Mack MP7; Mack MP8; Cummins L9N
- Transmission: Mack, Eaton-Fuller 6-18-spd Allison 5-6-spd auto.

Dimensions
- Wheelbase: 159–220 in (4,000–5,600 mm)
- Width: 96 in (2,400 mm)
- Curb weight: 81,000 lb (37,000 kg); Gross Vehicle Weight (GVW)

Chronology
- Predecessor: Mack MC/MR series
- Successor: Mack LR

The Mack TerraPro is a series of heavy duty (Class 8) and severe service trucks built by Mack Trucks. They are a forward control cab-over-engine type, where the driver sits in front of the axle. A flat front has two large windshields. A spotting feature is small notches in the lower inside of the windshields. It is used in refuse service and for construction concrete pumps.

A variant, the TerraPro Low Entry, with the cab mounted very low and forward, was replaced by the Mack LR in 2018.

== Design ==
The TerraPro is a forward control cab-over-engine with a low cab in front of the axle. This allows very tight turning radius for the overall length of the truck. The low cab also lets a boom operate over it. There is an available right-side driving position. Commonly a 6x4 (3 axles, 2 powered) tandem steer front and extra lift axles are available. Total loaded weight can be up to 81,000 pounds (37,000 kg) on three or more axles.

Advanced electronics are used for engine, chassis, and body controls, as well as maintenance. All trucks have ABS. Rear-view cameras are often fitted.

Mack builds their own major components (engines, transmissions, axles, and suspensions) and promotes an integrated design. Most vendor components are also available but engine choice is very limited.

== Engines ==
The TerraPro is available with two Mack diesels and a Cummins Westport natural gas engine.

The Mack MP7 is the base engine in the TerraPro. It is a 659 cubic inches (10.8 L) overhead cam turbocharged inline six-cylinder diesel engine. It develops 325 to 425 horsepower (242 to 317 kW) and 1,260 to 1,560 pound force-feet (1,710 to 2,120 N⋅m) of torque.

The Mack MP8 engine is the largest engine in the TerraPro. It is a 783 cubic inches (12.8 L) overhead cam turbocharged inline six-cylinder engine. It develops 415 to 505 horsepower (309 to 377 kW) and 1,460 to 1,867 pound force-feet (1,979 to 2,531 N⋅m) of torque. It has been in production since 2007.

The Cummins Westport L9N is a 543 cubic inches (8.9 L) turbocharged inline six-cylinder natural gas engine. It develops 329 horsepower (245 kW) and 1,000 pound force-feet (1,400 N⋅m) of torque.

== Transmissions ==
Both Mack and Eaton-Fuller have manual and automated shifting models. Manual transmissions have five or six main gears, extra ratios are made with different combinations of ranges. Allison transmissions are fully automatic.

Mack mDRIVE automated manual is the base transmission. It has no clutch pedal and shifts itself on demand. The driver can override it but it is normally driven in "D". It can have 12, 13, or 14-speeds. Other Mack manual transmissions have 8-18 speeds.

Eaton-Fuller UltraShift automated shifting systems are available on all of their transmissions from 9- to 18-speeds.

Allison RDS series 5- or 6-speed transmissions are used on most refuse trucks. The RDS is a fully automatic planetary gear transmission with a lock-up torque converter.

Transfer cases are used on concrete pumps. They direct full transmission output to either the drive-line or the pump, but not both.

== Frame ==
A ladder frame with beam axles is used. Front axles are on semi-elliptical leaf springs and tandem steer axles are available. The base rear suspension is a Mack tandem but other axle/suspension available. Wheelbases are from 159 to 220 inches (400 to 560 cm). The TerraPro has more frame options than other Mack trucks.

Dana-Spicer and Meritor supply air brakes, steering systems, driveshafts, and other components.

== Axles and suspensions ==
Front axles are available from 12,000 to 23,000 pounds (5,400 to 10,400 kg). Multi-leaf leaf springs are base, tapered leaves are optional. Springs have an eye mount at front but at the rear the spring goes through a solidly-mounted slipper. The slipper is stronger side to side than the typical shackle arrangement.

Mack powered axles have the drive carrier on top of the housing instead of the front of it like other manufacturers. This lets the driveshafts be in line from the transmission to and between the axles at a higher level above the ground. With the higher level above the ground the driveshafts and u-joints are less prone to dirt and damage, important in on/off road construction.

Other powered axles are available from Dana-Spicer and Meritor. These have front mounted carriers and in tandems the two axle housings are different.

Single rear axles rated at 23,000 pounds (10,000 kg) are available from Mack and Meritor.

The Camelback tandem is the base rear suspension. The Camelback has multiple leaves that rock above the bogey pivot then curve down and under the axles. It is strong in on/off-road service. It is available in ratings of 38,000, 44,000, 52,000, and 65,000 pounds (17,000, 20,000, 24,000, and 29,000 kg).

The mRIDE tandem has tapered leaves that rock above the bogey pivot then go out and above the axles. Struts go from the bottom of the bogey pivot out and under the axle. They have more wheel travel and ground clearance than the camelback. They are rated at 40,000, 48,000, and 52,000 pounds (18,000, 22,000, and 24,000 kg).

Walking beams have low bogie pivots with a balance beam going out and under the axles. Any suspension is above the bogey pivot. Walking beams are very stable at low speeds and when stopped. Mack and Hendrickson models are available.

Vendor tandems from Chalmers, Hendrickson, Meritor, and RAYCO are rated at up to 46,000 pounds (21,000 kg).

== Applications ==
=== Refuse ===
Front loaders drive directly up to a container. A boom goes from the body over and then down in front of, the cab. As the truck moves forward slowly two forks pick up the container. The container is then lifted up and over the cab to be dumped into a hopper on the top of the body. Front loaders are used for commercial pickup.

Side loaders drive next to bins placed on the curb. Most have a way to self-load from bins. Some have a low hopper between the cab and body. Others have an arm that picks up the bin, raises it up along the side of the body, then dumps it in a hopper on the top of the body. Side loaders are used for residential curb-side pickup. They have additional right (curb) side driving controls.

Rear loaders have a large hopper on the rear end. Typically a rear crew can load loose material, bins with assist, oversize pieces, and small containers. They are used for residential and light commercial pickup in congested cities.

Roll-off container trucks have a container that is raised in the front and slides off the back of the truck onto the ground. When a loaded box is carried it can be unloaded like a dump truck. They commonly haul construction debris but refuse containers are also left at commercial sites. TerraPros are sometimes used in congested cities when extreme maneuverability is required.

=== Construction ===
Concrete pumps have a multi-stage folding boom pivoted near the center of the truck and a hopper at the rear to load the pump. The pump itself is the load and the truck always operates at maximum weight. In transit the boom is folded front to rear. In use the pump uses outriggers and the boom unfolds forward over the cab or to either side. Large pumps can have multiple extra axles.

Concrete conveyors have a telescopic conveyor belt. They do similar work to a pump but are limited and rarely as heavy as a pump.

=== Other uses ===
Custom models for limited production are available but the cab-over-engine type has limited applications in the United States. The Massachusetts Bay Transportation Authority in Boston and the Metropolitan Transportation Authority in New York have two and three axle snowplow models.

== Gallery ==
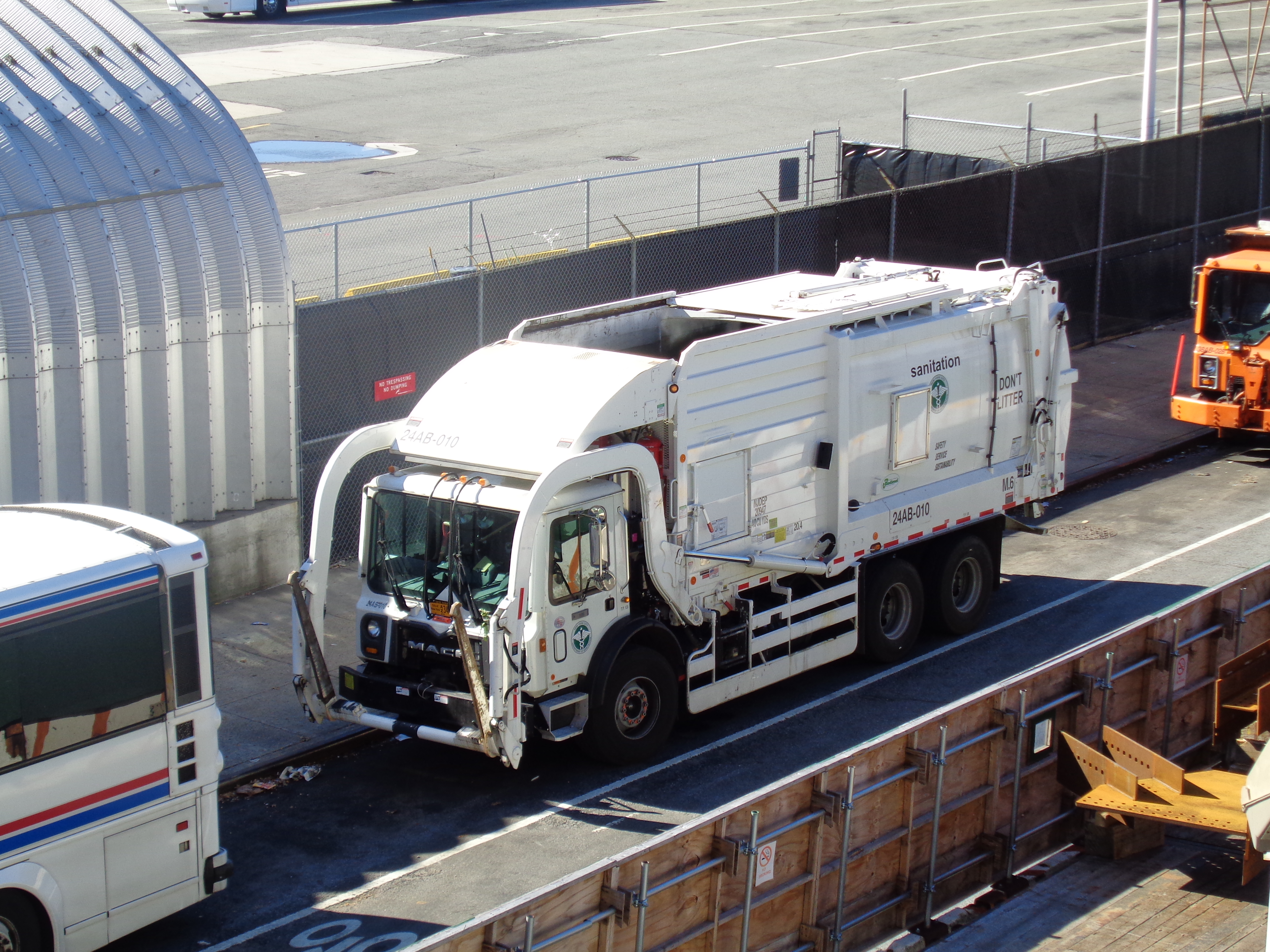
Front loader

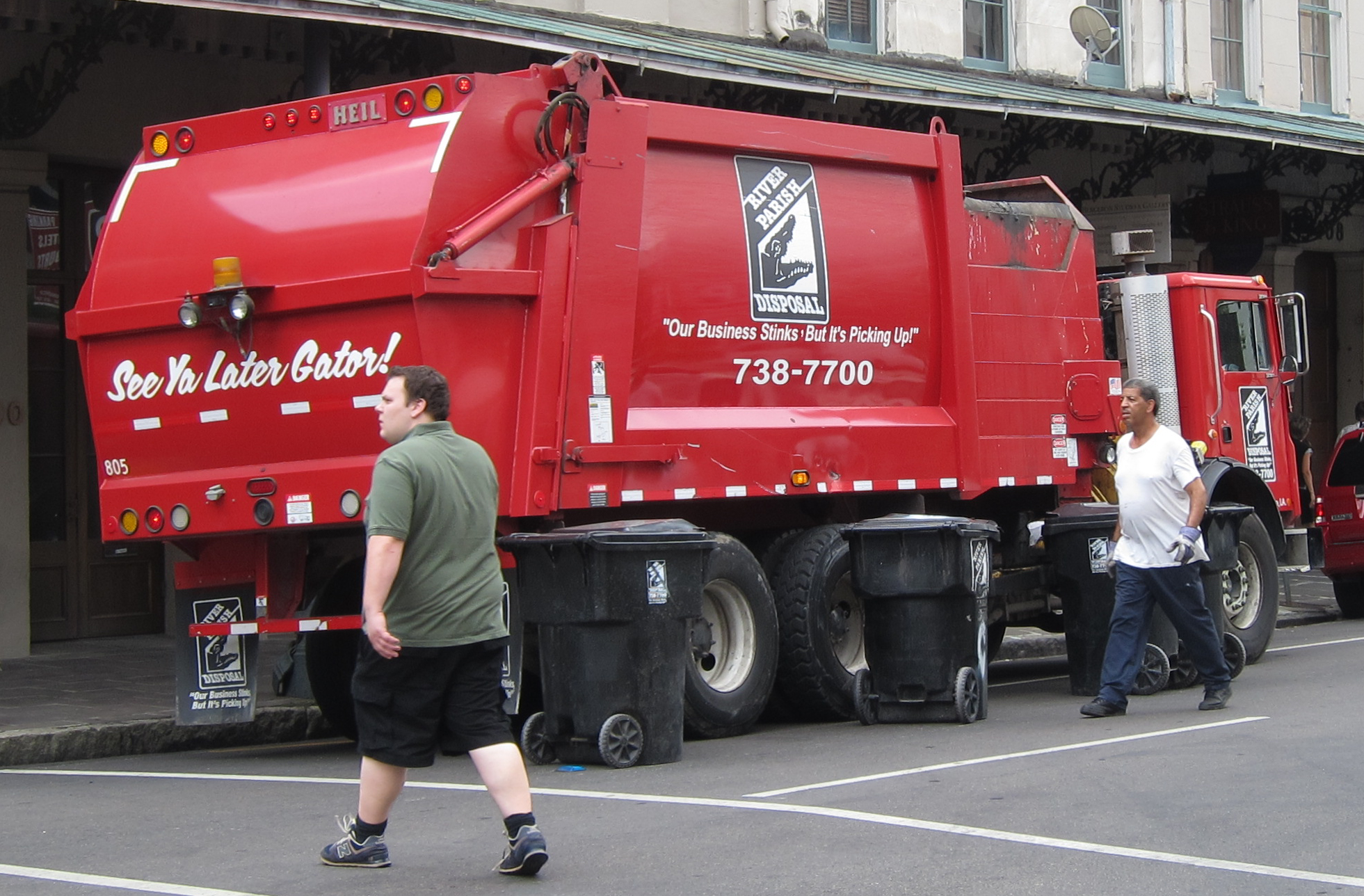
Side loader

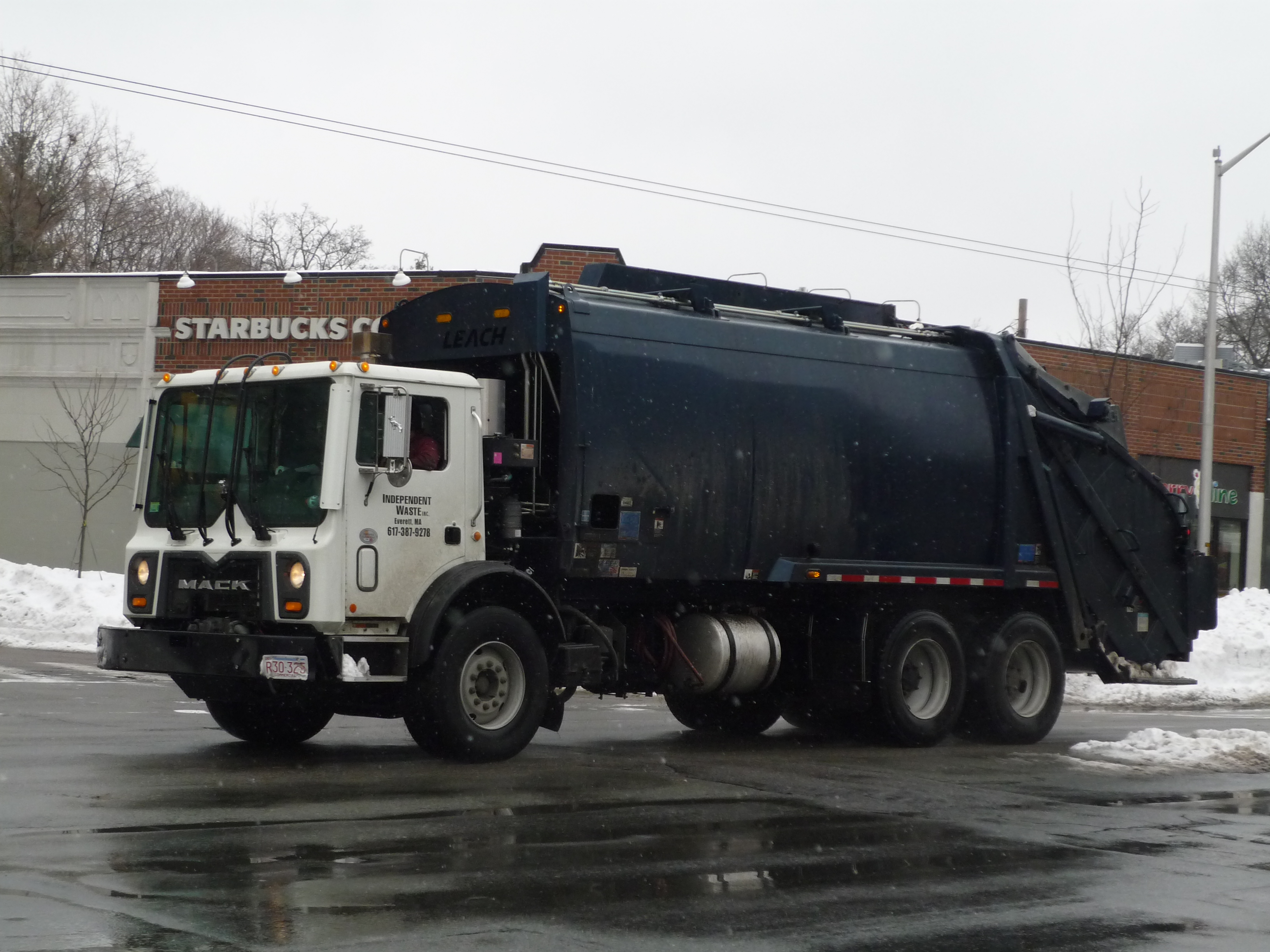
Rear loader

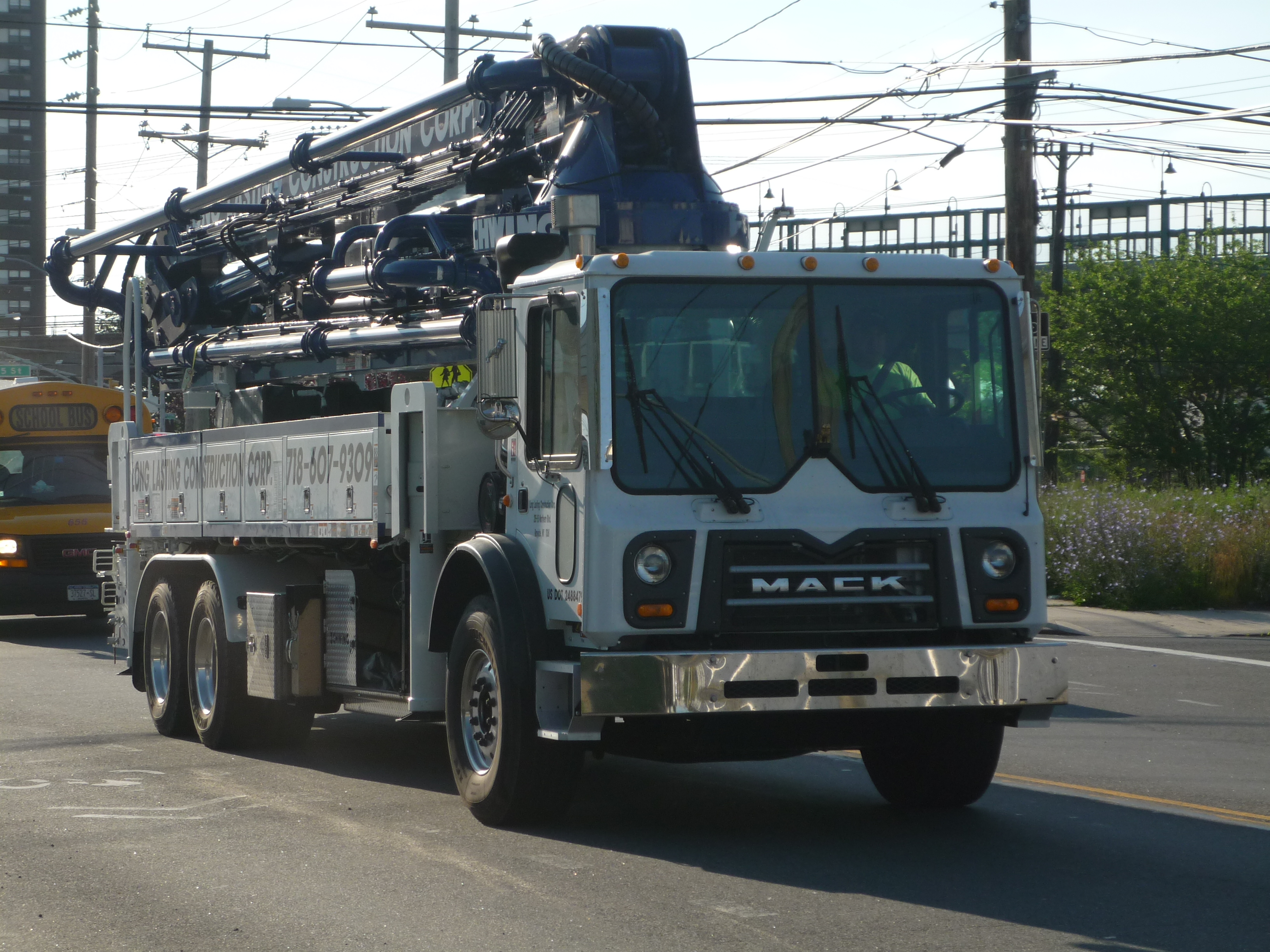
Concrete pump

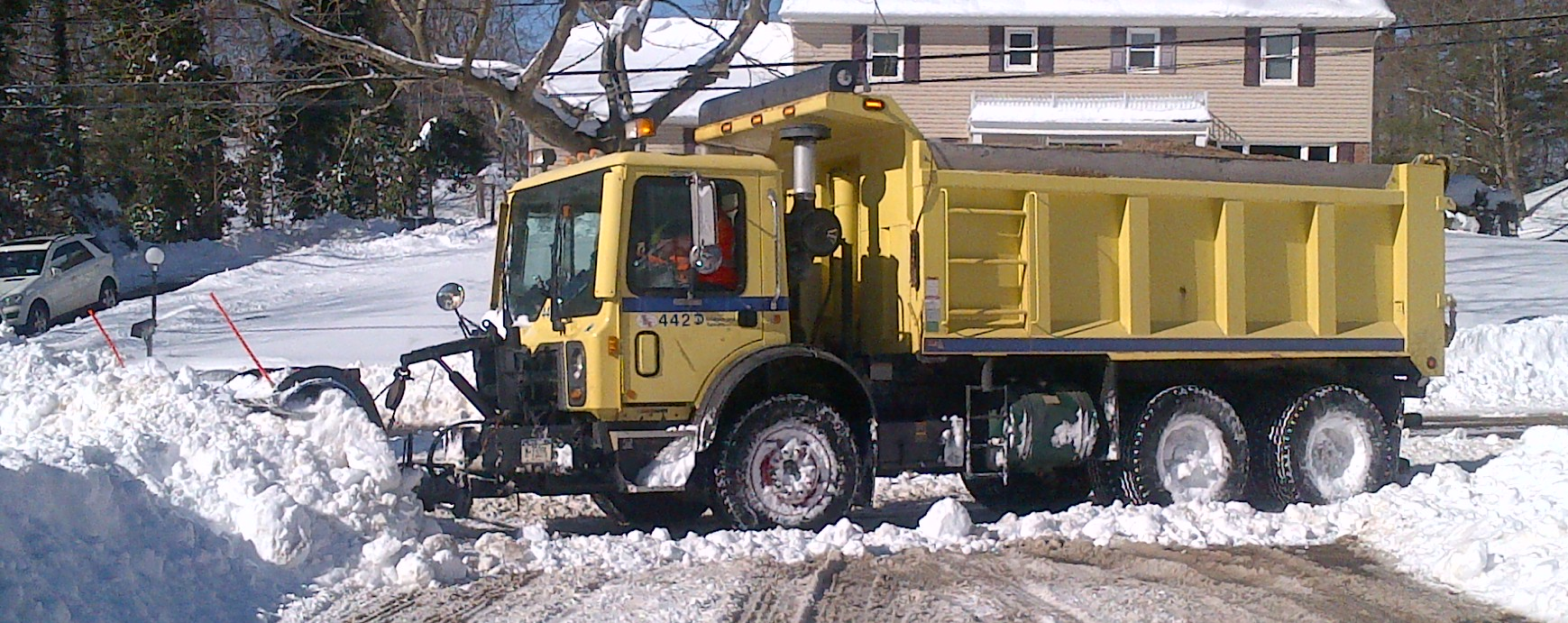
Snow plow

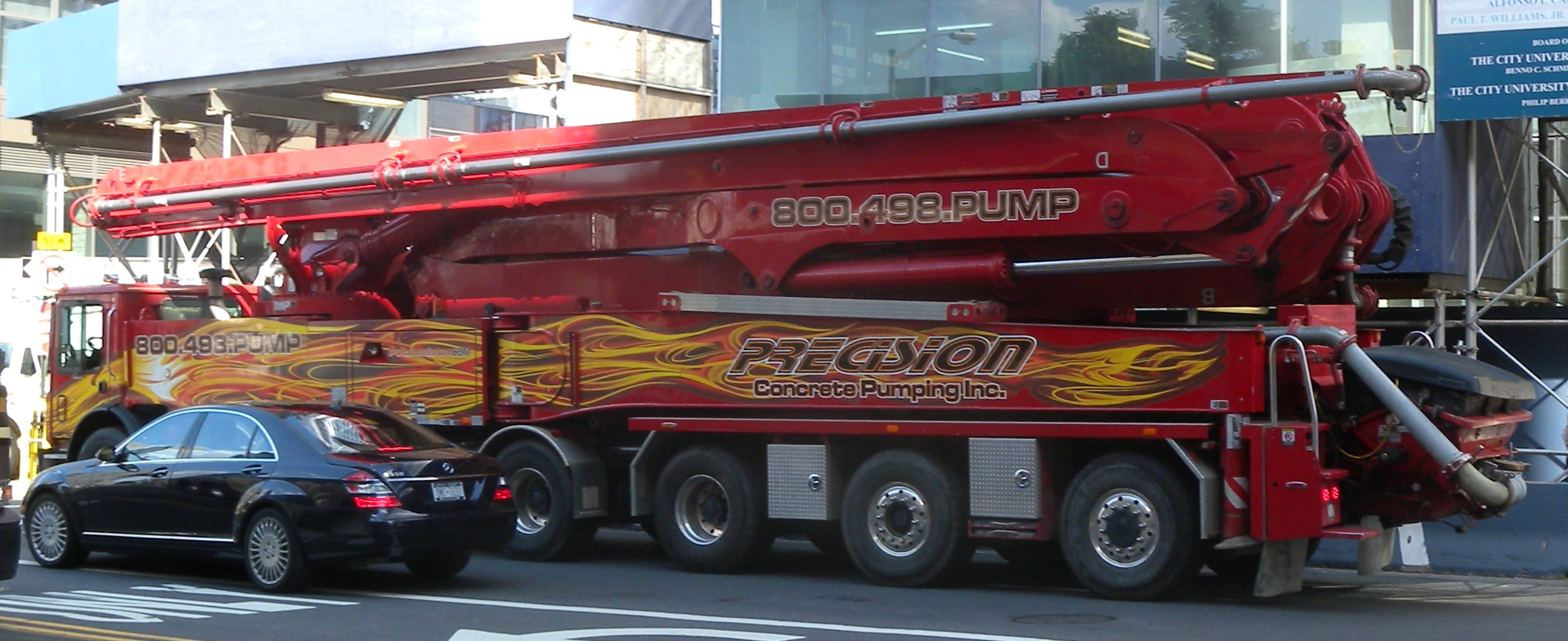
Monster concrete pump

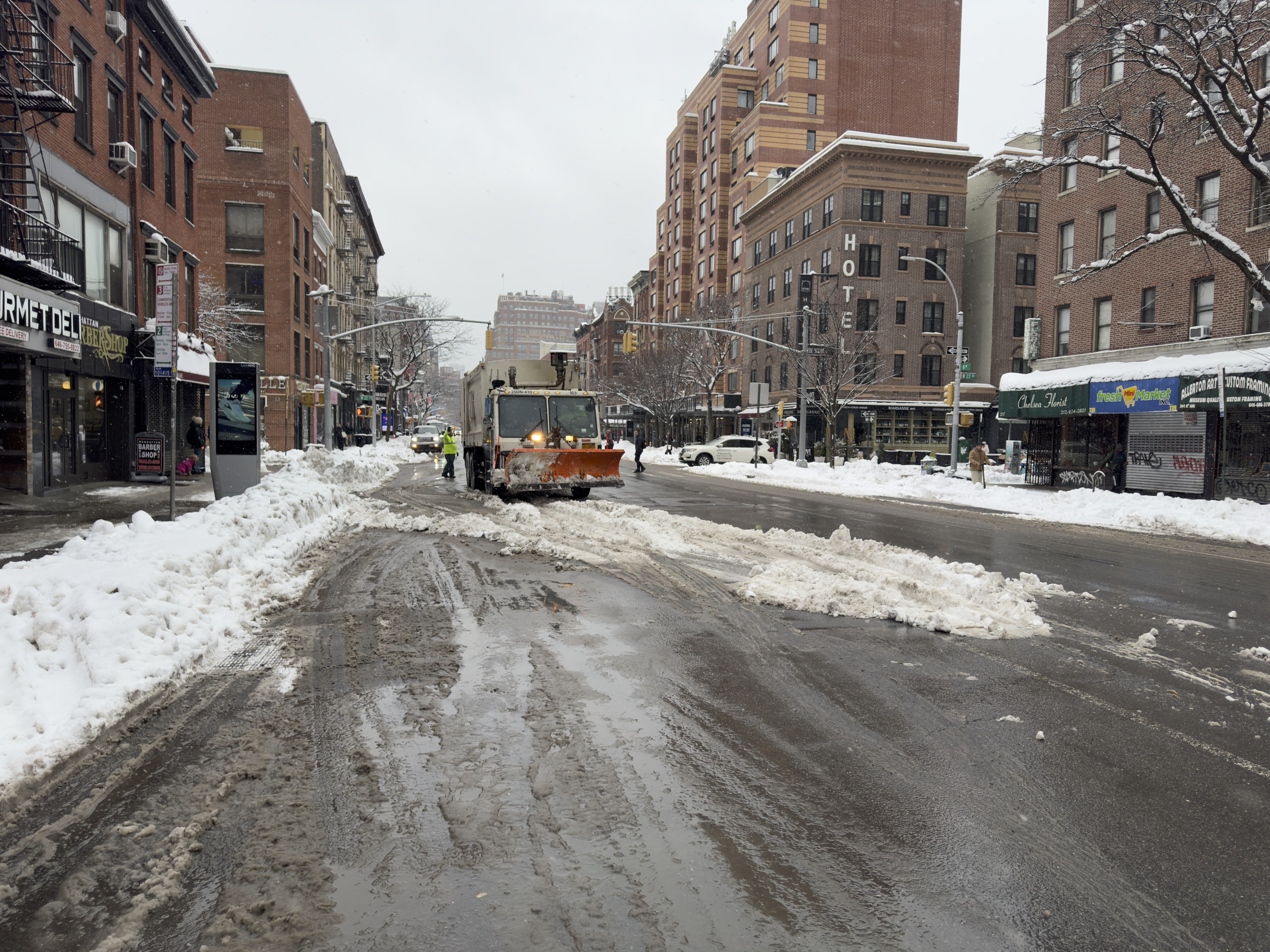
Snow removal New York City
