= Mack LR =

Truck chassis manufactured by Mack Trucks

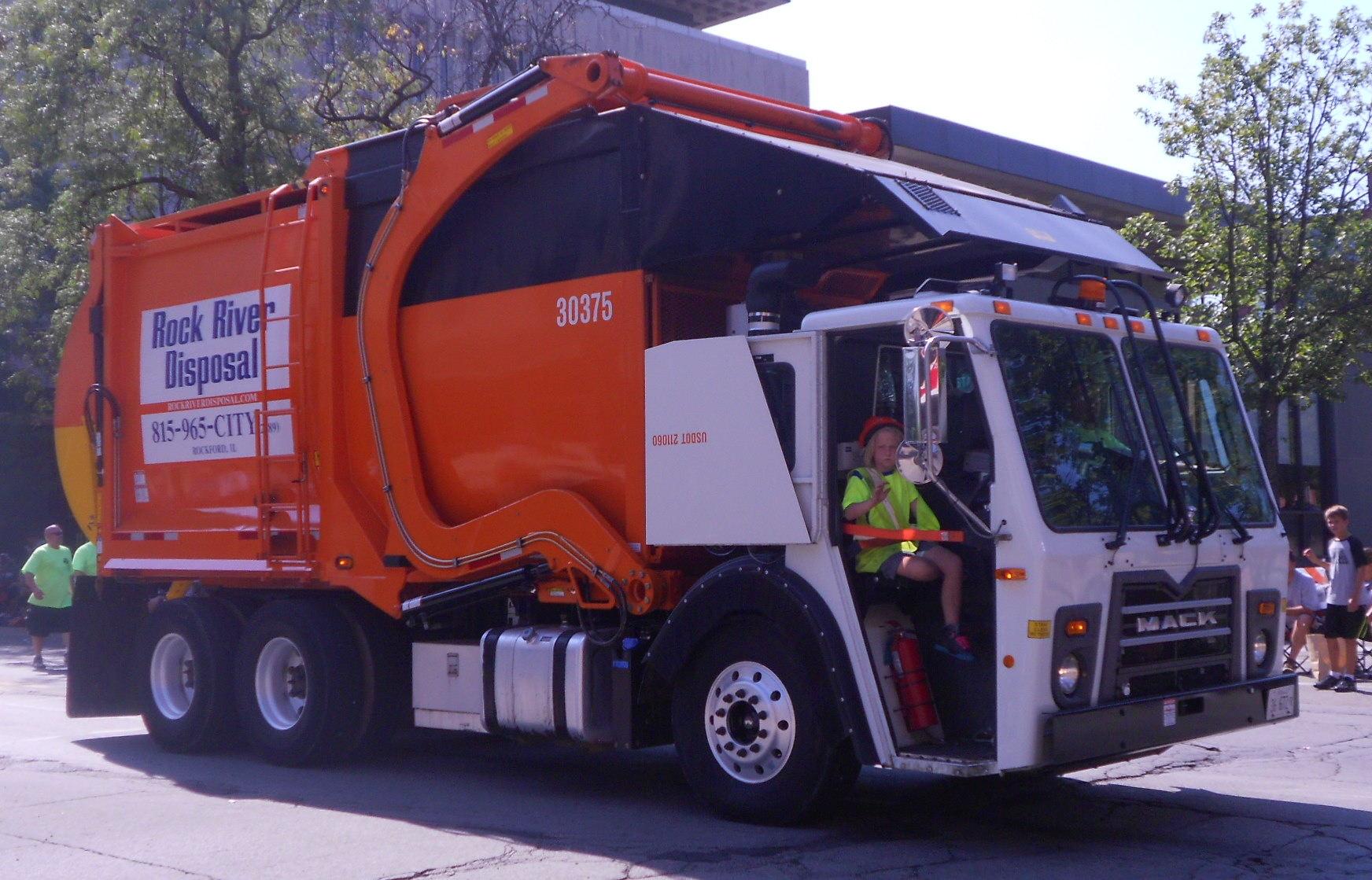
- TerraPro Low Entry Updated (LR is similar)

Overview
- Manufacturer: Mack Trucks
- Production: 2015-Present

Body and chassis
- Class: Class 8
- Body style: Low-entry forward control
- Layout: 4x2, 6x4

Powertrain
- Engine: Mack MP7; Cummins L9N; AC elec. with lithium-ion batteries
- Transmission: Allison 5-6 speed auto.

Dimensions
- Wheelbase: 173–246 in (4,400–6,200 mm)
- Width: 96 in (2,400 mm)
- Curb weight: 72,000 lb (33,000 kg); Gross Vehicle Weight (GVW)

Chronology
- Predecessor: Mack TerraPro

The Mack LR (Low Ride) is a series of heavy-duty (Class 8) trucks built by Mack Trucks. They are a forward control cab-over-engine type, where the driver sits in front of the axle. A flat front has two large windshields. The cab is very low-profile and has dual driving controls with a stand-up driving position on the right side. It is used in refuse service with front, side, and rear-loading refuse compactor bodies. Introduced in 2015 it remains in production in 2020.

The LR is a direct evolution of the 1994 model LE and the upgraded 2007 TerraPro LE. All three models are mechanically and visually similar.

== Design ==
The LR is a forward control cab-over-engine type. The cab is mounted very low and forward, allowing a step up from the ground to the cab floor of only 17 inches (43 cm). It has a stand-up right-side (curb) driving position. Total loaded weight can be up to 72,000 pounds (33,000 kg).

Advanced electronics are used for engine, chassis, and body controls, as well as maintenance. The trucks have ABS. The service brakes can be electrically applied, allowing the driver to exit leaving them on. This system can also shift the transmission into neutral when it is applied. There are locations for a joystick and other controls. Rear-view cameras are often fitted.

Mack builds their own major components (engines, axles, and suspensions) and promotes an integrated design but all LRs use a vendor transmission. Most other vendor components are also available but engine choice is very limited.

== Engines ==
The LR is available with a Mack MP7 diesel, Cummins Westport natural gas engine, and since 2020, an all-electric drivetrain.

The Mack MP7 is the base engine in the LR. It is a 659 cubic inches (10.8 L) overhead cam turbocharged inline six-cylinder diesel engine. It develops 325 to 425 horsepower (242 to 317 kW) and 1,260 to 1,560 pound force-feet (1,710 to 2,120 N⋅m) of torque.

The Cummins Westport L9N is a 543 cubic inches (8.9 L) turbocharged inline six-cylinder natural gas engine. It develops 329 horsepower (245 kW) and 1,000 pound force-feet (1,400 N⋅m) of torque.

== Transmission ==
Allison RDS 6-speed transmissions are used on all models except the LR Electric. The RDS is a fully automatic planetary gear transmission with a lock-up torque converter.

== LR Electric ==
The LR Electric has 2 AC motors with 536 horsepower (400 kW) Peak and 448 horsepower (334 kW) continuous power. This is combined with a 2-speed Mack Powershift transmission. Power is supplied by a NMC lithium-ion battery pack (Lithium Nickel Manganese Cobalt Oxide) that can be charged in about 2 hours at 150 KW.

== Frame ==
A ladder frame with beam axles is used. Front axles are on semi-elliptical leaf springs. The base rear suspension is a Mack tandem but other axle/suspension types are available. The LR has more frame options than other Mack trucks, with drop frames available. Wheelbases are from 173 to 246 inches (440 to 620 cm) and 250 inches (640 cm) with a drop frame.

Dana-Spicer and Meritor supply air brakes, steering systems, driveshafts, and other components.

== Axles and suspensions ==
Front axles are rated at 20,000 pounds (9,100 kg).

Mack powered axles have the drive carrier on top of the housing instead of the front of it like other manufacturers. This lets the driveshafts be in line from the transmission to and between the axles at a higher level above the ground.

Other powered axles are available from Dana-Spicer and Meritor. These have front mounted carriers and in tandems the two axle housings are different.

The Camelback tandem is the base rear suspension. The Camelback has multiple leaves that rock above the bogey pivot then curve down and under the axles. It is available in ratings of 38,000, 46,000, and 52,000 pounds (17,000, 21,000, and 24,000 kg).

The mRIDE tandem has tapered leaves that rock above the bogey pivot then go out and above the axles. Struts go from the bottom of the bogey pivot out and under the axle. They have more wheel travel and ground clearance than the camelback. They are rated at 40,000, 48,000, and 52,000 pounds (18,000, 22,000, and 24,000 kg).

Vendor tandem combinations can be ordered.

== Applications ==
Front-loaders have a boom or "arms" that goes from the body over and then down in front of, the cab. Two forks pick up the container. The container is then lifted up and over the cab to be dumped into a hopper on the top of the body. For curbside pick-up a container is held in a low position and material is loaded into it. It is dumped into the hopper when full then returned to a low position. A large wall the height of the truck is hydraulically moved towards the back of the truck and compresses waste into the body. At the designated disposal site, the wall can move all the way to the back of the truck, and about 6 inches out that back to unload the truck.

Side loaders drive next to bins placed on the curb. They either have a hopper on the side or pick up a bin and dump it into a hopper on the top of the body. A large horizontal packing ram that is anywhere from 6-36 inches tall is hydraulically forced through a small space in between the hopper and truck "body". Waste is compressed until the hydraulic packing ram can no longer move.

Rear loaders have a large hopper on the rear end. They can load bins, cans, and loose material. A large scooping compactor crushes and scoops refuse into the body. Rear loaders are well known in the waste industry for being the "take all" truck.
