= Roll-off (dumpster) =

North American open-top dumpster

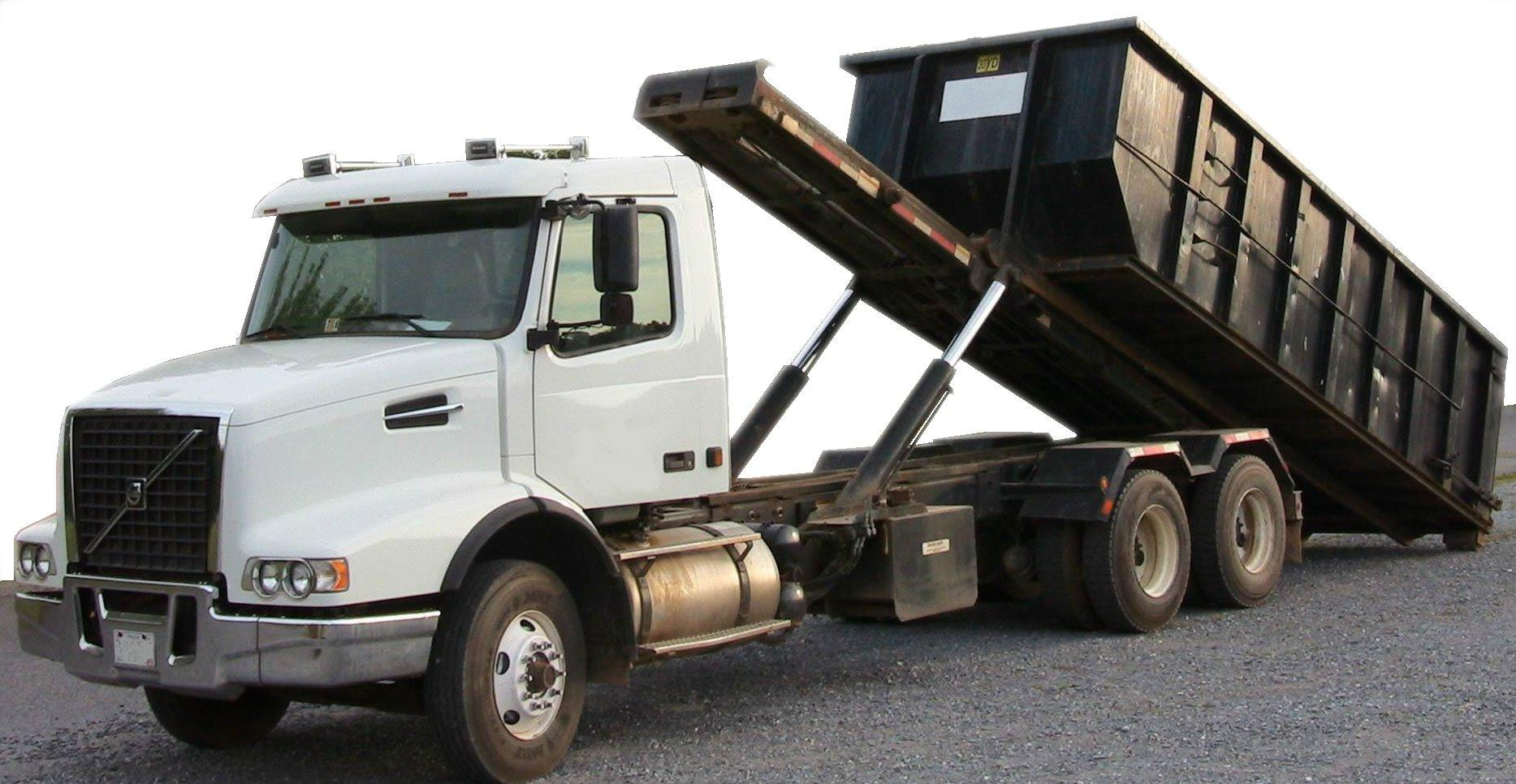
An Volvo VHD roll-off truck

In North America, a roll-off is a dumpster equipped with wheels to facilitate placement and removal of the dumpster. The container is designed to be transported by special roll-off trucks. While most roll-off containers have a swinging door on the end for easier disposal of waste, some roll-off containers are not open-top; for example, those used with commercial or industrial trash compactors are often closed at the top in order to prevent persons from entering.

Roll-offs are commonly used to contain loads of construction and demolition waste or other waste types, especially when the volume of waste is high. The material in the roll-off may be taken to a landfill, recycled, or recovered or disposed of using some other means.

== Size ==
Roll-off containers have a rectangular footprint typically determined by the size of typical trucks. Roll-off container sizes are determined by the amount of debris they can hold, measured in cubic yards. Container sizes commonly found in the United States include 10, 12,15,16, 20, 30, and 40 cubic yards, equivalent to approximately 7.65 m³, 11.47 m³, 15.29 m³, 22.94 m³, and 30.58 m³. In other countries, these sizes span from 2 to 40 cubic meters, approximately ranging from 2.6 to 52.3 cubic yards.

While the roll-offs may be rented by volume, there may be weight limitations. Weight limits may be necessary to ensure compliance with road-use and safety laws and regulations. Most roll-off providers will have a weight limit for each container size. Containers loaded with more weight than allowed typically will not be hauled away due to safety reasons. Containers that are overloaded can result in damage to the roll-off truck and the road it drives on. The maximum weight is specified at the beginning of the job. In cases where the material to be disposed of is especially dense, such as dirt, rock, or concrete, a container with lower sidewalls is used. This is to help reduce the risk of exceeding the weight limit. The standard weight limit determined by the department of transportation is not to exceed ten tons of debris.

== Operation ==
After the container is picked up, it is taken to a disposal facility where it is weighed before (gross) and after (tare) dumping. The difference is the net weight, and is used to calculate charges to the customer. For efficiency, some facilities pre-record weights of trucks and containers. This allows the tare weight to be looked up and eliminates the need for a second weighing.

Roll-offs are placed by roll-off trucks. As the roll-off truck raises its hydraulically operated bed, the roll-off container rolls off the bed. A cable is used to slowly lower the container. After the waste container is loaded, the roll-off truck pulls the filled container onto the roll-off truck with the cable and winch system. If the roll-off truck is not a winch system, then it is most likely a hook-lift system. A hook-lift system works by the truck extending a 90 degree arm with a hook on the end which hooks under a bar and gently lifts the dumpster onto the truck. Most hook-lift systems are on smaller roll-off trucks, as they are usually used for 20-yard containers and under. These smaller systems are usually the preferred option on smaller scale construction jobs such as roof replacement, kitchen remodels, and garage clean-outs. Smaller single-axle trucks are generally viewed as safer operations as they are much lighter and more easily transported in residential areas. When carried, the roll-off must be covered with a tarp.

== Cost factors ==
There are three parts to roll-off dumpster pricing: dump rate, haul rate, and overage fees. Dumpster rental companies pay the landfill, transfer station, recycling center, or other type of disposal facility a fee to dump the customer's waste. Fees fluctuate from area to area and facility to facility. Dump fees can be the majority of the cost for the dumpster, and are measured in short tons in the U.S. The haul rate is the rate that roll-off rental companies charge to cover operating costs and generate profit. Overage fees are additional fees the customer must pay if the dumpster is loaded more than the allotted tonnage limit. Overage fees are typically prorated and the same as the company's dump rate.

== Disadvantages ==
One problem often encountered with roll-off containers is the liability of scratching or damaging the surface they are placed on. Most roll-off containers have metal rollers for wheels, which can at times scratch or be abrasive to a concrete or asphalt surface. It is recommended to place a protective board such as plywood under the container to avoid a situation where the placement surface can be damaged. Most roll-off companies do not offer plywood, but will place the container on the wood if supplied. The roll-off must be placed on a hard surface other than dirt. Gravel, asphalt, and concrete are all acceptable. If the container is placed on dirt, the wheels may sink after a rainfall event and the truck could get stuck.

There are many items that are not accepted by roll-off rental companies. These items include but are not limited to chemicals, including paint and petroleum products, tires, and electronics. The prohibition of items is often to comply with laws and regulations concerning disposal of hazardous materials. Roll-off drivers may refuse to pick up loads containing prohibited materials. If the load is picked up, the roll-off rental company may charge the customer additional for cleaning the load and proper handling of the contaminating material.

== Legal issues ==
Some municipalities require that a permit be obtained in order to have a roll-off dumpster delivered. If the container is being set on private property, most cities will not require a permit. Some municipalities require the permit to be obtained by the customer, while others require the permit to be obtained by the roll-off provider. However, many cities do not require permits to have a dumpster delivered.

There are usually prohibited items that are commonly not allowed for disposal, such as hazardous materials, tires, freon appliances, televisions, paint, asbestos, batteries, oils, fuels, and tar-treated railroad ties because of regulations affecting final waste disposal.

== See also ==
- Dumpster
- Roller container – a similar container, but a hook-lift is used to roll-off the container.
- Sidelifter – specialized vehicle for shipping containers.
- Skip (container)
- Tank chassis
- Waste container
- Waste management
- Demountable Rack Offload and Pickup System – military system used for containerised loads using a similar principle
