= Lehigh Valley Operations =

- Built: 1974–1975
- Operated: 1975–present
- Location: 7000 Alburtis Road; Macungie, Pennsylvania, United States
- Coordinates: 40.5180°N 75.5737°W
- Industry: Automotive
- Products: trucks
- Employees: 2,800
- Area: 164 acres (66 ha)
- Volume: 1,700,000 square feet (160,000 m^{2})
- Owner: Mack Trucks (Volvo)

Lehigh Valley Operations, formerly known as Macungie Assembly Operations Plant, is a Mack truck manufacturing plant in Macungie, Pennsylvania, owned by Volvo.

== History ==
The plant was opened in 1975 as Macungie Cab and Vehicle Assembly, with its first vehicle, a Mack F711ST highway truck, rolling off the assembly line on November 19th of the same year.

In January 1986, Mack Trucks announced it would build a new $80 million truck assembly plant in Winnsboro, South Carolina, to replace its older Allentown truck plant (Plant 5-C), bypassing Pennsylvania after a breakdown in concession negotiations. The company negotiated with the United Auto Workers over wage and benefit concessions of $2.04 per hour to keep a major new assembly plant in the Lehigh Valley.

In 1995, the Mack Trucks Historical Museum moved from its original garage location in Macungie, Pennsylvania, into a facility within Lehigh Valley Operations to free up production space at the Macungie plant.

On July 27, 2001, Mack Trucks laid off about 300 workers (out of a 940-person workforce) at the Macungie truck plant, as part of a reduction of more than 700 job cuts across three states.

In October 2006, Mack Trucks announced it would cut 450 jobs out of a 1,040-worker payroll at the plant following a sales slowdown after a production boom. Eight months later in June 2007, the plant implemented a one-week layoff/shutdown affecting roughly 350 workers due to weak demand for construction trucks.

In October 2008, the plant recalled about 150 previously laid-off workers to boost production due to an increase in foreign orders from Latin America, the Middle East, and Africa. The hiring was short-lived relative to the great recession; by December 2008, Mack Trucks announced plans to lay off 180 workers at the same facility due to worsening economic conditions.

== Products made ==
=== Current ===
- Mack Granite (2001–present)
- Mack Pinnacle (2006–2027)
- Mack Pioneer (2025–present)

=== Former ===
- Mack R series (1975–2005)
- Mack Titan (2008–2017)
