= Superliner =

Superliner may refer to:

- Superliner (passenger ship), an ocean liner of more than 20,000 gross tons
- Superliner (railcar), a double-decker passenger car used by Amtrak
- Mack Super-Liner, a heavy-duty truck manufactured by Mack Trucks
