= Mack Valueliner =

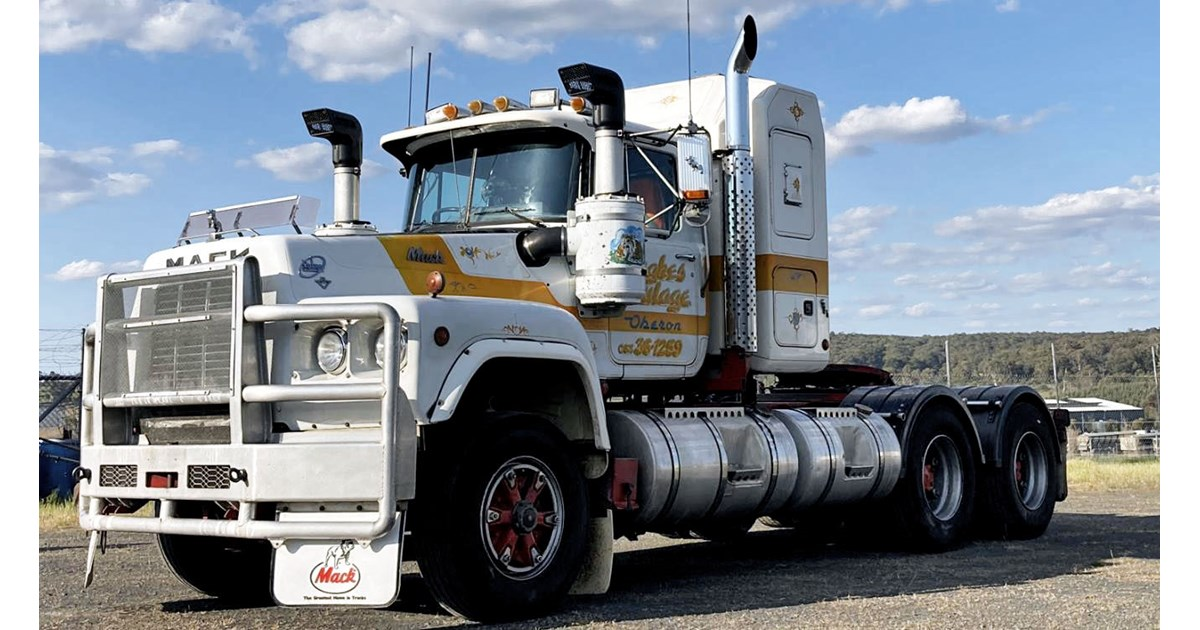

Overview
- Manufacturer: Mack Trucks
- Production: 1986-1992 (Australia)

Body and chassis
- Class: Class 8 truck
- Body style: Conventional (bonneted cab-chassis)
- Related: Mack Super-Liner

Powertrain
- Engine: Mack E6 & E7 6-cylinder or E9 V8
- Transmission: Mack 10 & 12 speed manual

Chronology
- Predecessor: Mack R series
- Successor: CHR & CLR

The Mack Valueliner is a heavy-duty truck that was introduced by Mack Trucks in Australia in 1986 to replace the Mack R model. Its production lasted for six years, until it was replaced by the CHR & CLR models.

The E6 and E7 powered Valueliners featured a flat bonnet and two-piece mudguards while E9 V8 powered versions had a sloped bonnet and a raised cab. As with most Macks at the time, all Valueliners came out of the factory with air starter motors.

== See also ==
- List of Mack Trucks products
- Mack Super-Liner
- Mack Trucks
