= Mack Pioneer =

Heavy-duty truck

Overview
- Manufacturer: Mack Trucks
- Production: 2025–present
- Assembly: United States: Macungie, Pennsylvania (Lehigh Valley Operations)

Body and chassis
- Class: Class 8 heavy-duty tractor
- Body style: Conventional daycab, sleeper
- Layout: RWD single or tandem axle
- Related: Volvo VN, Mack Anthem

Powertrain
- Engine: Mack MP13; Mack MP13 HE
- Transmission: Mack mDRIVE automated manual

Dimensions
- Wheelbase: 186"–243"
- Length: 18'–25'
- Width: 96"–100"
- Height: 10'–12'
- Curb weight: 13,000–18,000 lbs.

Chronology
- Predecessor: Anthem

The Mack Pioneer is a heavy-duty truck produced by the American vehicle manufacturer Mack Trucks. Initially developed in North America, it was introduced in 2025. The Mack Pioneer is manufactured in Pennsylvania, United States

== History ==
Details of the Pioneer were first announced by Mack Trucks in April 2025. The Pioneer supersedes the Anthem as Mack's flagship on-highway offering; the Anthem was later repositioned as a regional haul truck owing to its success in that market. Production commenced in August 2025 at Mack's Lehigh Valley Operations plant in Macungie, Pennsylvania, with the first units being delivered to customers in November of that year.
