= Mack Super-Liner =

Class 8 heavy-duty truck

Mack Super-Liner & Super-Liner II
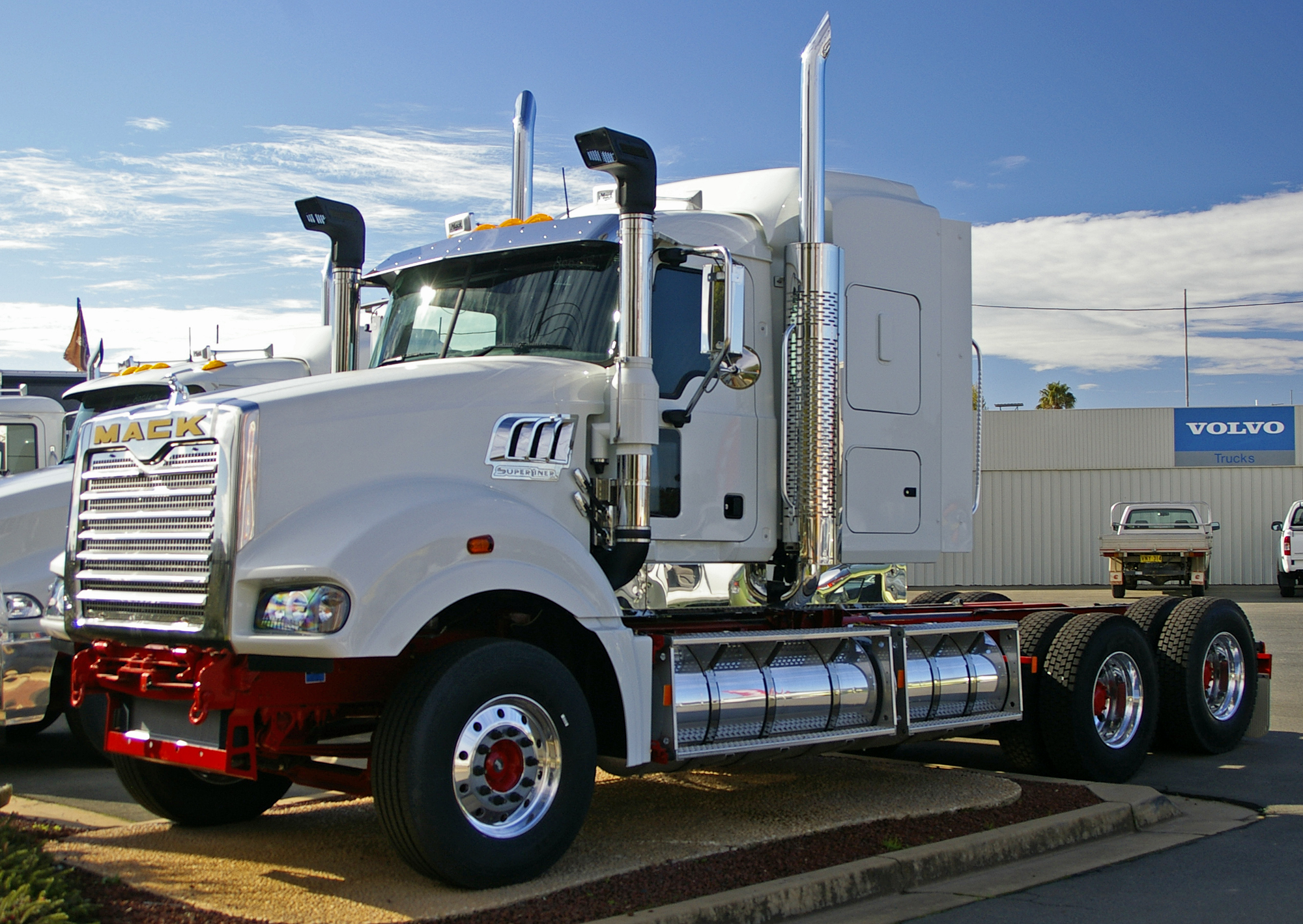

Overview
- Manufacturer: Mack Trucks; Mack Trucks Australia
- Also called: Mack RW600/700
- Production: 1977–1993 (North America); 1980–present (Australia)

Body and chassis
- Class: Heavy Duty Truck
- Body style: Conventional (bonneted cab-chassis)
- Related: Mack WR Cruise-Liner; Mack MH Ultra-Liner; Mack CL700; Mack R series (Australia); Mack Valueliner

Powertrain
- Engine: Mack EA7 (6-cylinder) or EA9 (V8)
- Transmission: Mack / Fuller (manual); Allison (automatic)

Chronology
- Predecessor: Mack R Model
- Successor: Mack CL700 (North America); Mack Vision (North America)

The Mack Super-Liner is a model line of Class 8 trucks produced by Mack Trucks. Produced in North America from 1977 to 1993, the model line was a conventional-cab tractor configured primarily for highway and vocational applications, serving as the flagship conventional of the Mack product line in North America. Following its 1993 discontinuation, the Super-Liner was replaced by the CL700; today, its closest equivalent is the Mack Anthem.

Since 1980, the model line has been sold by Mack Trucks Australia; currently, it is in its third generation.

== Background ==
The development of Super-Liner began life in the early 1970s under Brockway Motor Company, a subsidiary manufacturer of Mack Trucks. While using the cab of the Mack R-series in its production, Brockway competed nearly directly against Mack in heavy-duty truck sales. Following the introduction of the long-hood "western" Mack RS700, Brockway commenced development of the "Super-Liner", featuring a squared-off hood (to accommodate a larger radiator/engine).

In 1977, Brockway Motor Company was closed down by Mack Trucks, following labor disputes that ended its production. While much of Brockway was liquidated, Mack continued further development on a set-forward axle Super-Liner, entering production by the end of 1977. As the design already used a Mack RS cab, the Super-Liner saw only minor detail changes before entering production, internally designated as the RW700.

== Model overview ==
=== American production ===
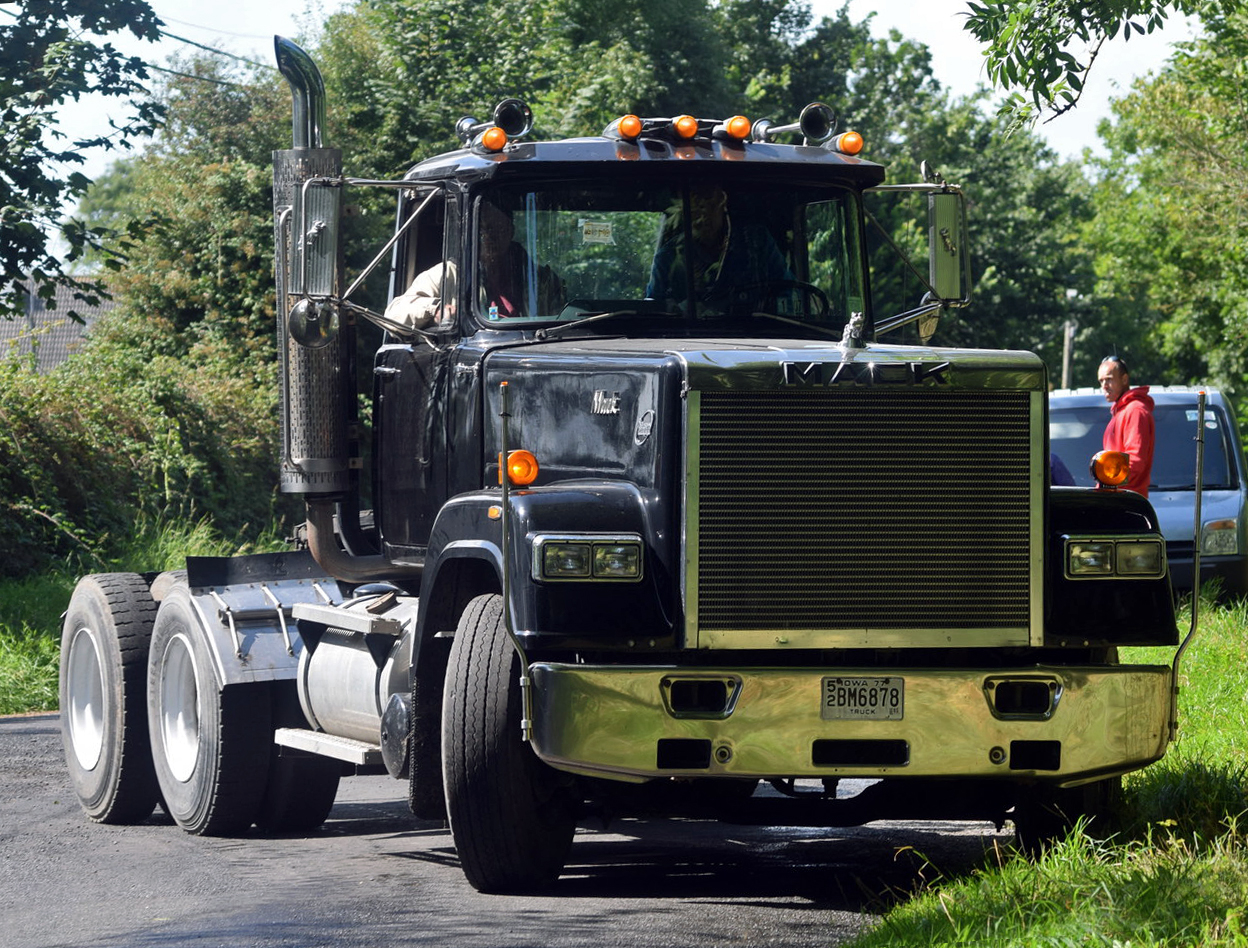
1977 Mack Super-Liner (exported to Ireland)

Introduced during 1977, the Mack RW700 effectively replaced the RS700 "western" conventional. While sharing the cab of the R-series tractors (along with its model designation), the Super-Liner was built on the frame of the WR Cruise-Liner COE. The first-generation Super-Liner is externally distinguished by four round headlights (in a rectangular housing); the interior has a 3-spoke steering wheel.

For 1985 production, Mack introduced the second-generation Super-Liner, named Super-Liner II. Visibly similar to its predecessor (with the exception of four square headlights), the Super-Liner II adopted the full-length frame rails of the MH Ultra-Liner COE. Alongside detail changes to the interior, a smaller 2-spoke steering wheel was added.

Following 1993 production, the Super-Liner RW-700 was discontinued. As its replacement, Mack introduced the CL700, a longer-hood version of the CH600; though shifting to a set-back front-axle layout, the CL continued the use of the Super-Liner frame.

==== Super-Liner Magnum ====
To commemorate the introduction of the Super-Liner II, Mack produced the Magnum special-edition series of Super-Liner IIs and Ultra-Liners for 1985. Designed as an appearance package, the exterior of the Magnum Super-Liner was black with Magnum wording on the hood, red/orange cab striping, and a red interior. The standard engine was the Mack E9 diesel V8 (400-500 hp) with a 9-speed Mack T2090 transmission.

In total, Mack produced 250 of the Magnum special edition for 1985. 186 were Super-Liner IIs, with the other 64 being Ultra-Liner COEs.

=== Australian production ===
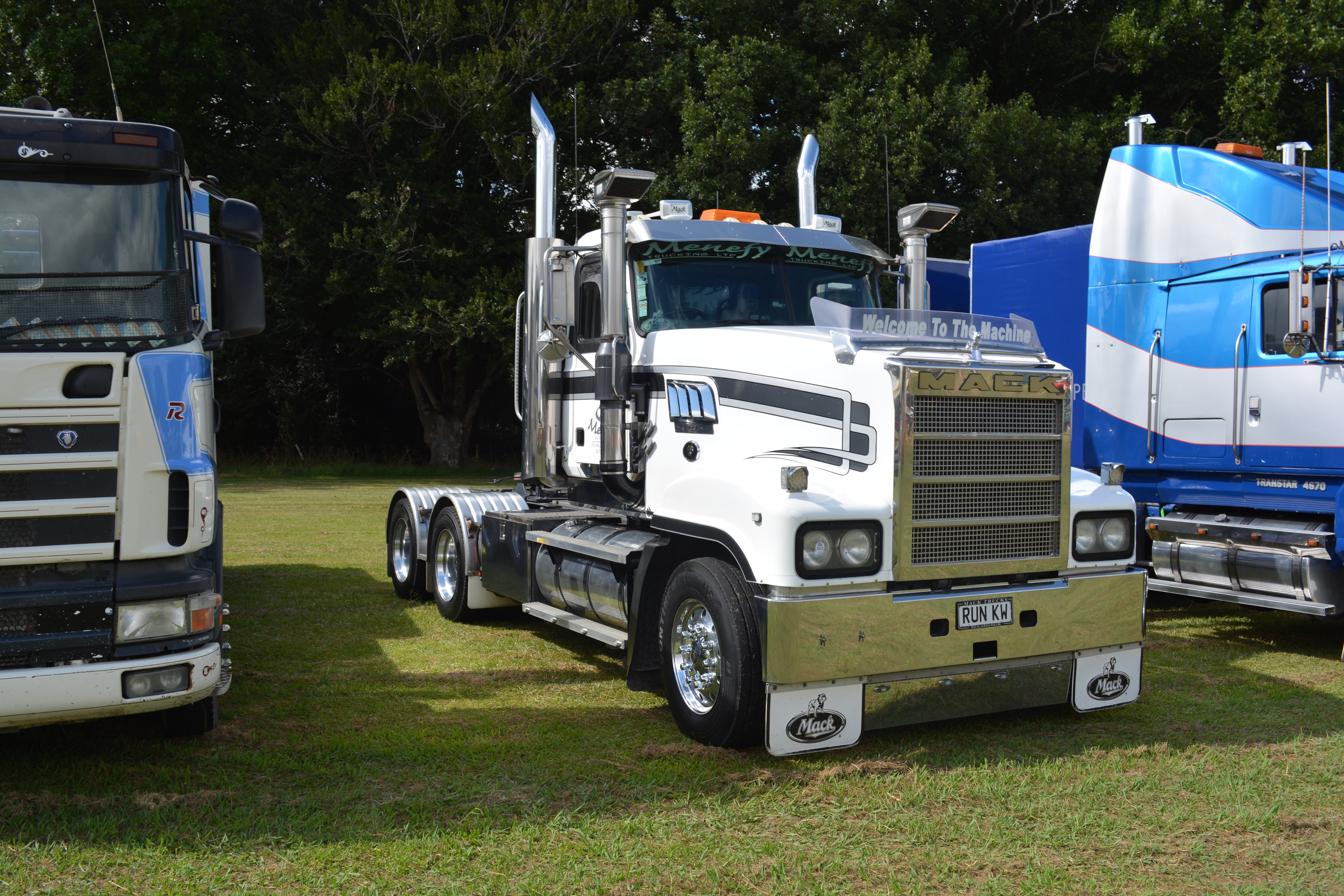
2007 Mack Super-Liner III (New Zealand)

Since 1980, Mack Trucks Australia has produced the Super-Liner in Australia. In place of sharing the chassis of the WR and MH COEs, Australian-produced Super-Liners shared frames with the R-series throughout their production. Currently slotted below the Titan, the Super-Liner is in its third generation. Alongside the Titan, the Super-Liner is offered with a 685 hp MP10 engine.

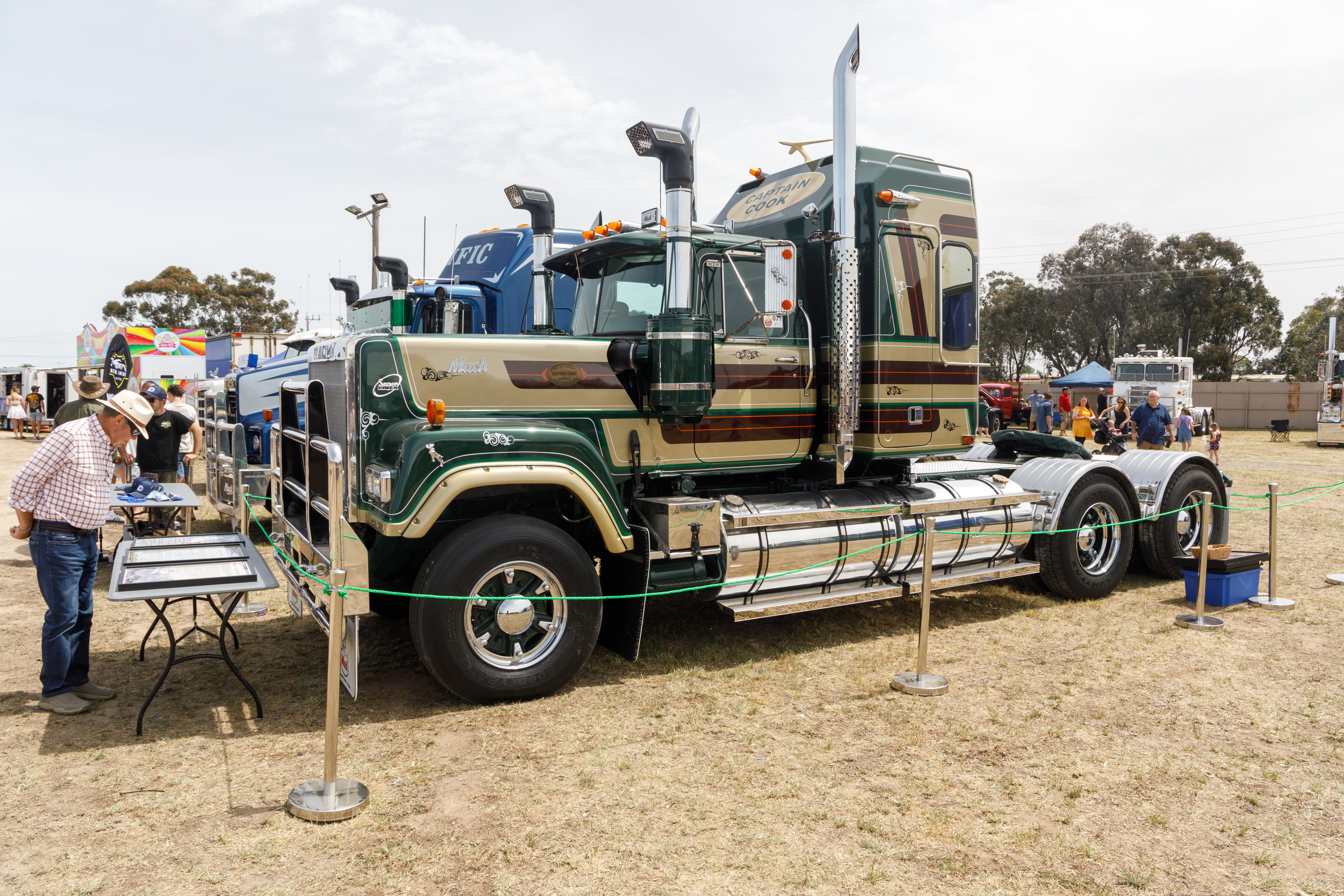
Captain Cook Mack Bicentennial Superliner II

==== Super-Liner II Bicentennial ====
To commemorate the bicentennial of Australia Day, Mack Trucks Australia produced 16 Super-Liner II Bicentennial trucks in 1988. Each example was named after people influential to Australian history, including James Cook, Captain Bligh, Ludwig Leichhardt, Governor Phillip, Ned Kelly, Kingsford Smith, John Flynn and William Hovell. The 230-inch wheelbase trucks were fitted with a 500 hp E9 V8 diesel and a 12-speed triple-countershaft transmission.

One remaining example is operated by Eagle Towing Service of Ringwood, Victoria and has since been converted to a heavy towing salvage truck. Two more remaining examples are from Mactrans Heavy Haulage, who own Captain Starlight and Thunderbolt.

== Gallery ==
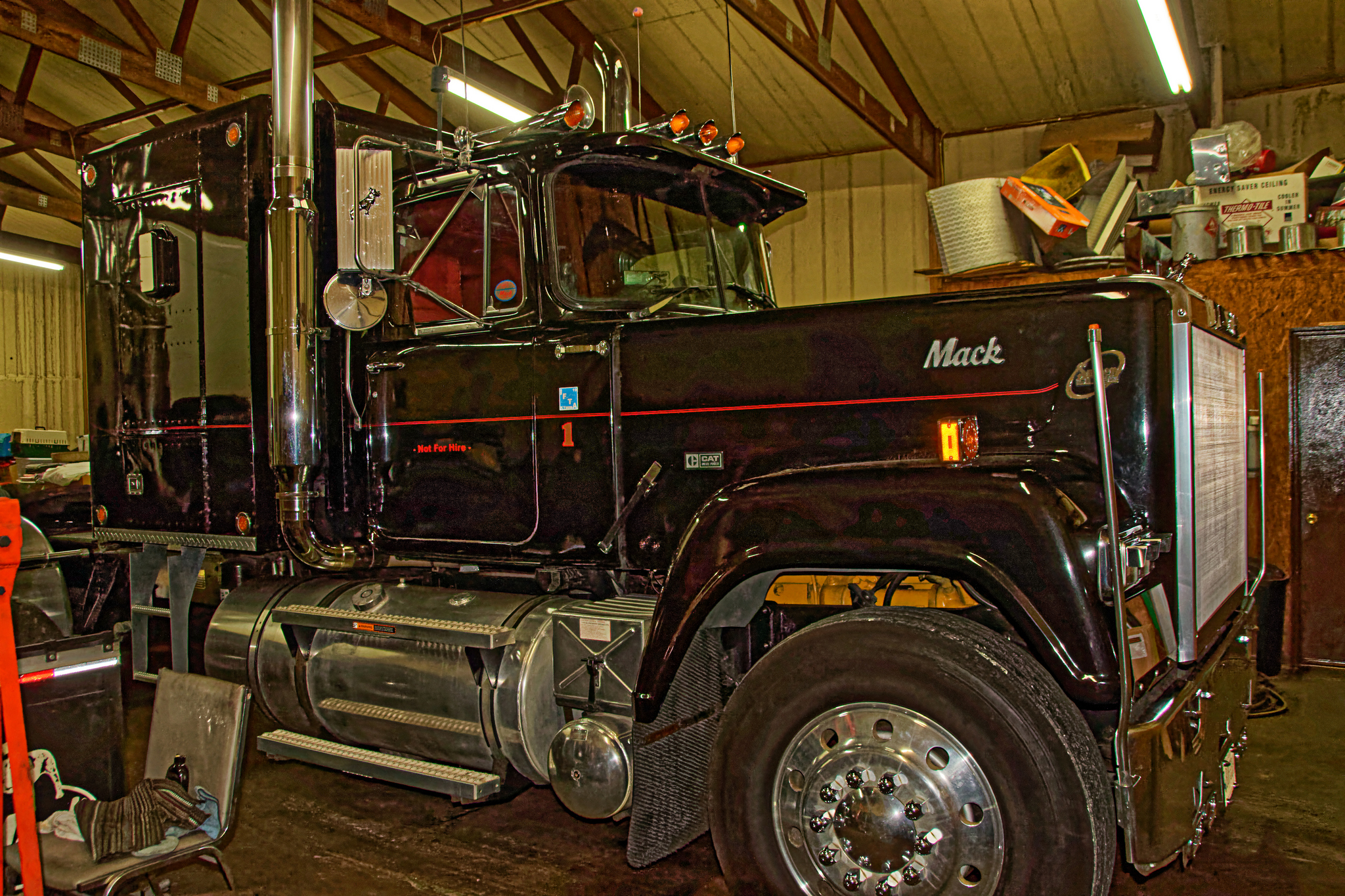
1986 Mack Super-Liner II w/Caterpillar Power in Kentucky

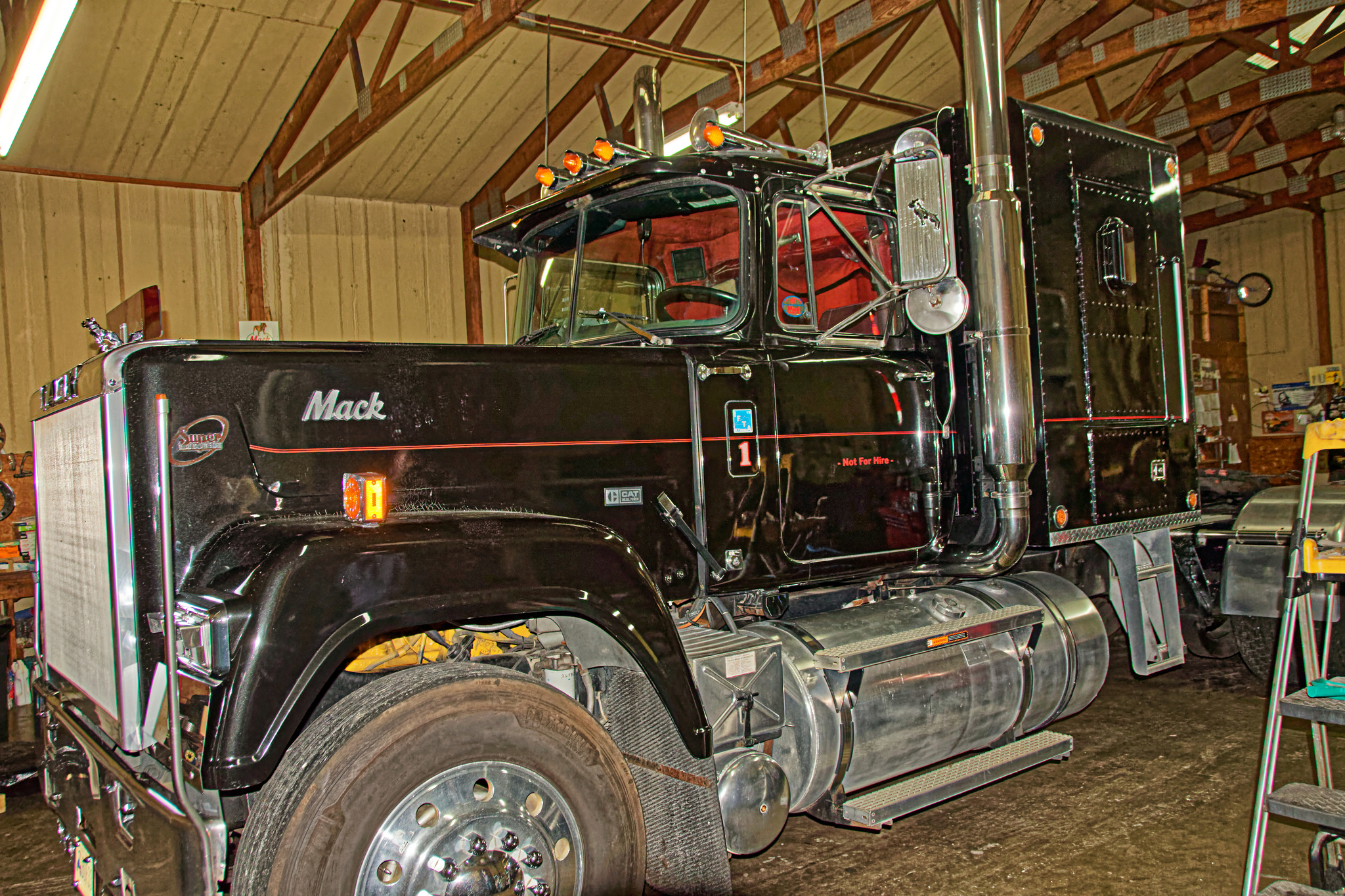
1986 Mack Super-Liner II w/Caterpillar Power in Kentucky

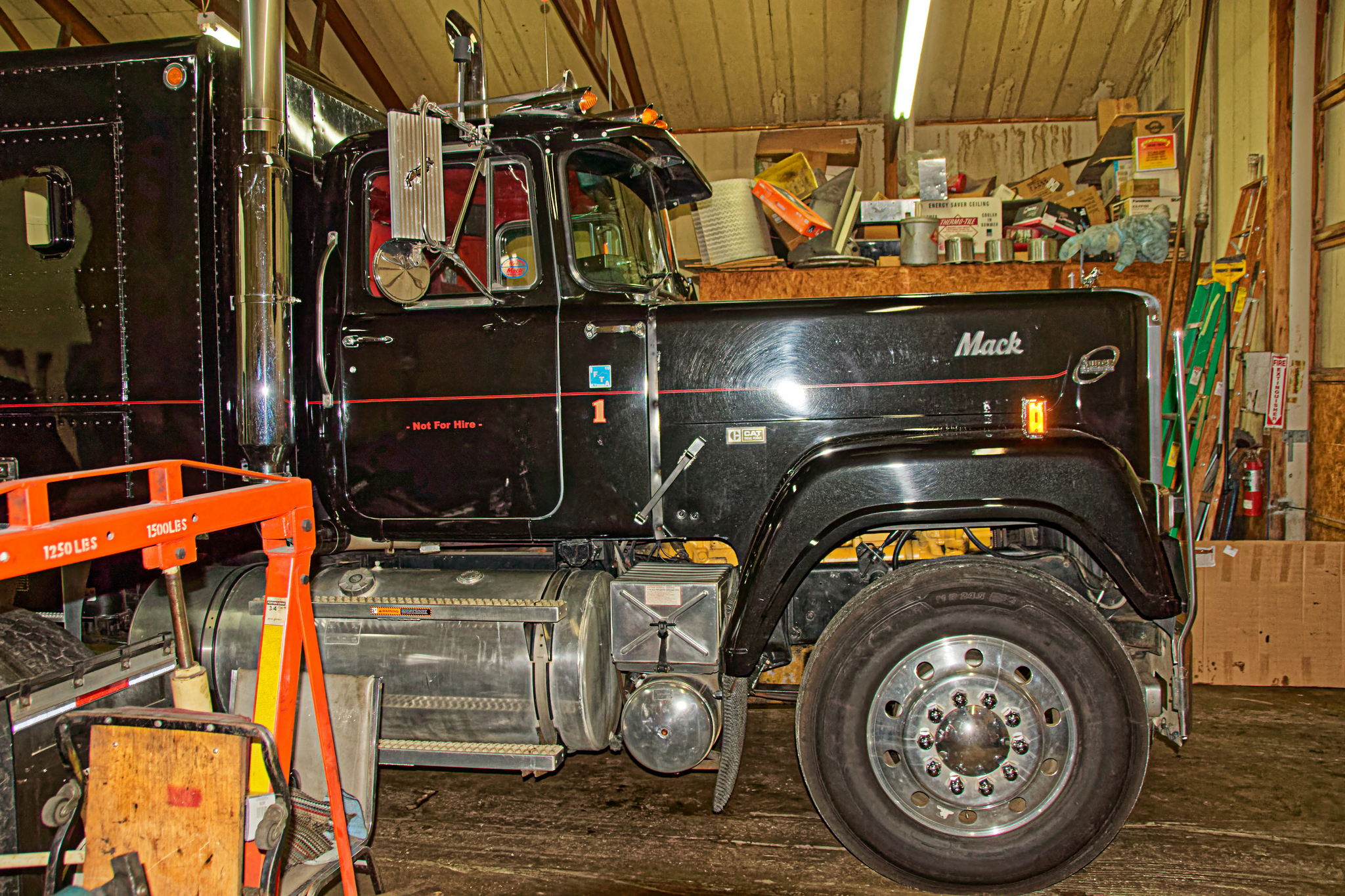
1986 Mack Super-Liner II w/Caterpillar Power in Kentucky

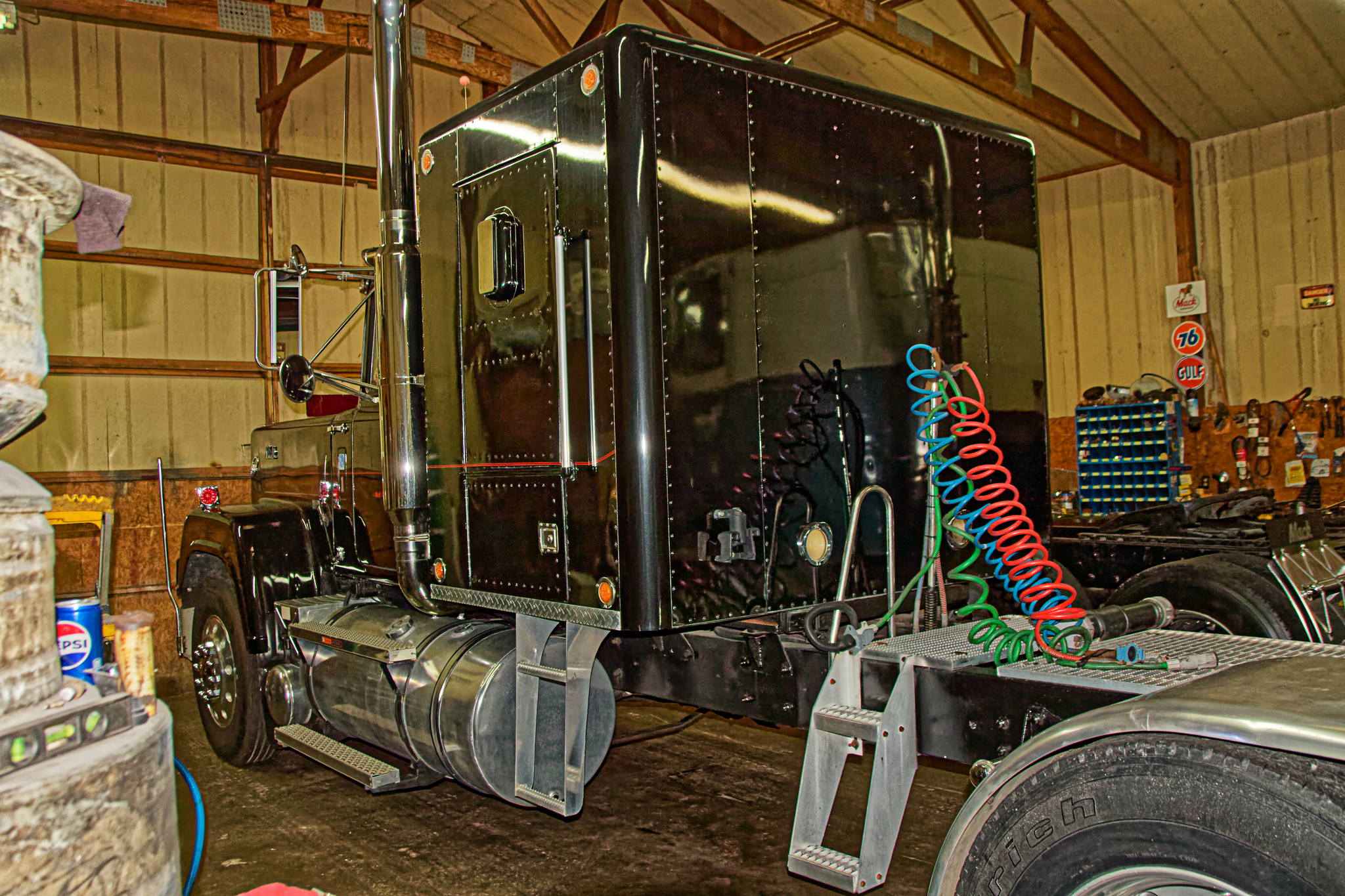
1986 Mack Super-Liner II w/Caterpillar Power in Kentucky

== Appearance in media ==
In the 1978 film Convoy, a Mack RS700 is driven by main character Martin "Rubber Duck" Penwald (Kris Kristofferson). As the film was released after the replacement of the RS700 by the Super-Liner, Mack inserted the Super-Liner in all promotional materials and products related to the film.

In the Cars franchise, the character "Mack" was inspired by a 1985 Mack Super-Liner.

== See also ==
- Mack Trucks
- List of Mack Trucks products
- Mack Valueliner
