= New River Valley Assembly Plant =

- Operated: 1975–present
- Location: 4881 Cougar Trail Road; Dublin, Virginia, United States
- Coordinates: 37°04′40″N 80°42′40″W
- Industry: Automotive
- Products: trucks
- Employees: 3,000
- Area: 566 acres (229 ha)
- Volume: 2,300,000 square feet (210,000 m^{2})
- Owner: Volvo Trucks (Volvo)

New River Valley Assembly Plant is a Volvo truck manufacturing plant in Dublin, Virginia, owned by Volvo.

== History ==
The plant was opened in 1975 as a truck assembly plant by White Motor Corporation, producing trucks at a rate of roughly 20 trucks per day. Volvo acquired the company in 1981, which included the Dublin truck plant, along with other plants in Ogden, Utah and Orrville, Ohio.

On October 3, 1982, the plant rolled out its first U.S.-assembled Volvo heavy-duty truck, a 1982 Volvo F7 model. The truck was returned to the company in August 2018 when the Wilson family (founders of Wilson Trucking Corporation) donated it back.

The facility finished a $160 million overhaul in 1996, which added a world-class paint facility, a cab-assembly plant, and a second vehicle-assembly line. In August 1996, the plant announced layoffs for about 140 workers (nearly 10 percent of the workforce), split between hourly and salaried employees, following an earlier layoff of 190 employees. In 2000, Volvo Trucks finished a major $148 million expansion at the plant, adding about 1,300 new jobs over a three-year span.

In April 2008, Volvo Trucks North America announced it will lay off 1,100 workers at the New River Valley plant, cutting production to a single shift due to a weak economy and plummeting truck sales.

== Products made ==
- Volvo VN (1996–present)
