= Mack Pinnacle =

Heavy duty truck

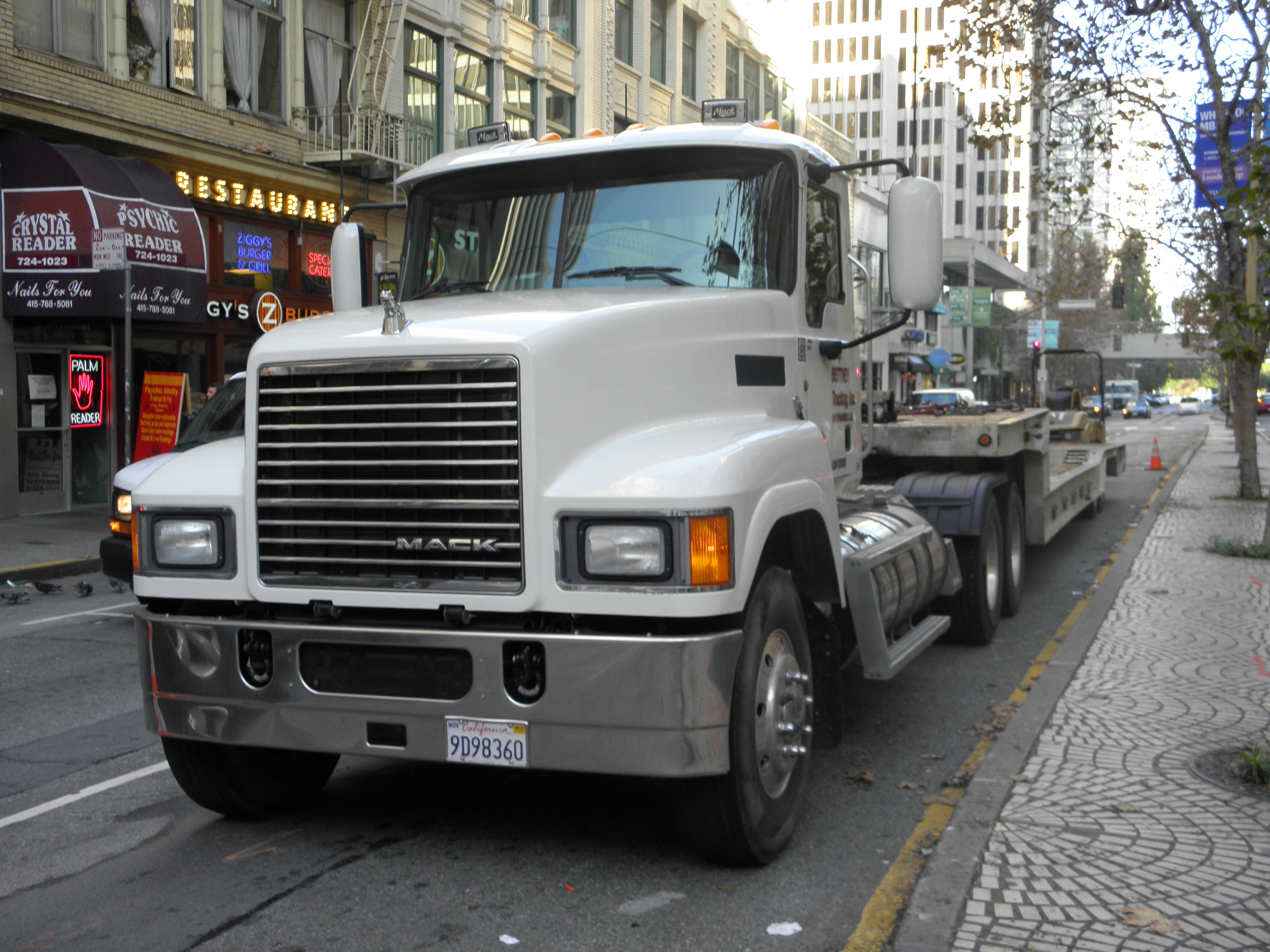

Overview
- Manufacturer: Mack Trucks
- Also called: Mack Vision Elite
- Production: 2006–2027
- Assembly: United States: Macungie, Pennsylvania (Lehigh Valley Operations)

Body and chassis
- Class: Truck (Class 8)

Powertrain
- Engine: Diesel: 659 cu in (10.8 L) MP7 turbo I6; 783 cu in (12.8 L) MP8 turbo I6
- Transmission: 8–18-speed Mack manual; 12/13/14-speed Mack mDRIVE automated manual; 9–18-speed Fuller UltraShift automated manual; 6-speed Allison automatic

Chronology
- Predecessor: Mack Vision
- Successor: Mack Anthem (Axle Back configuration); Mack Keystone (Axle Forward configuration)

The Mack Pinnacle is a series of heavy duty (Class 8) trucks produced by Mack Trucks. Introduced in 2006, the Pinnacle is the successor of the Mack Vision. Currently, the product line is sold in the United States and Canada. In Venezuela and Peru, the Pinnacle is marketed as the Mack Vision Elite.

Marketed primarily as a highway tractor, the Pinnacle is sold in a set-forward front-axle configuration (the set-back axle version has been replaced in the United States and Canada by the Mack Anthem). Mack assembles the Pinnacle in its Lehigh Valley Operations facility in Macungie, Pennsylvania.

In 2026, it was succeeded by the Keystone.

== Design ==
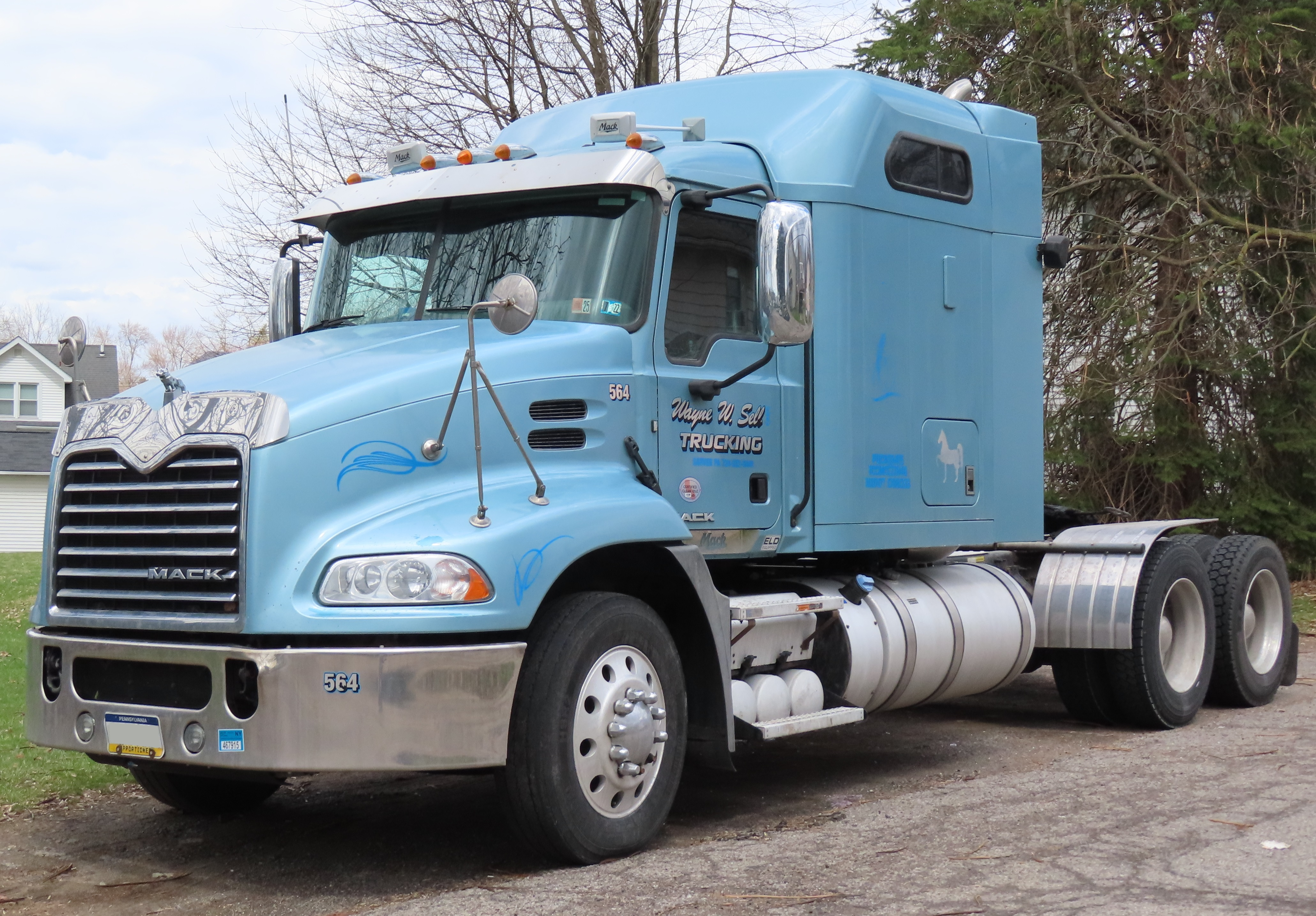
Mack Pinnacle CXU613 sleeper cab

The Pinnacle is a long-hood conventional semi-tractor. Designed for local and regional use it usually has a day-cab but five sleepers, from a 48-inch (1,200 mm) flat top to a 70-inch (1,800 mm) hi-rise, are available. Roof fairing, side shields, and skirts aerodynamic aids are offered.

Advanced electronics are used for engine and chassis controls, as well as maintenance. All trucks have ABS.

In 2008, Mack revealed the Mack Pinnacle Rawhide Edition, a model focused on combining the technology of the Pinnacle with a more luxurious, classic styling. The Rawhide Edition included modifications such as a "chrome bumper, stainless steel cab and sleeper skirts, forward-mounted dual seven-inch stacks, a 13-inch stainless steel sun visor and four chrome air horns."

In 2019, a new generation Bendix Wingman Fusion was available in the Anthem. It uses radar and cameras to provide emergency braking, lane departure, and blind spot warnings.

Mack builds most of their components (engines, transmissions, and axles) to work together. Trucks can also be custom-designed with vendor components. Total loaded weight can be up to 62,000 pounds (28,000 kg) and over 80,000 pounds (36,000 kg) including trailers.

== Engine ==
When introduced for 2006 the Pinnacle used the new MP7 engine, the MP8 was available in 2007. The MP8 is currently the only engine available in the Pinnacle.

The Mack MP7 is a 659-cubic-inch (10.8 L) overhead cam turbocharged inline six-cylinder diesel engine. It develops 325 to 425 horsepower (242 to 317 kW) and 1,260 to 1,560 pound force-feet (1,710 to 2,120 N⋅m) of torque.

The Mack MP8 is a 783-cubic-inch (12.8 L) overhead cam turbocharged inline six-cylinder engine. It develops 415 to 505 horsepower (309 to 377 kW) and 1,460 to 1,867 pound force-feet (1,979 to 2,531 N⋅m) of torque.

== Transmissions ==
All Mack transmissions have aluminum cases and three counter-shafts. Both Mack and Fuller have manual and automated shifting models. Allison transmissions are available exclusively as fully automatic.

Mack mDRIVE™ automated manual is the base transmission. It has no clutch pedal and shifts itself on demand. The driver can override it but it is normally driven in "D". It can have 12, 13, or 14-speeds. Other Mack manual transmissions have 8-18 speeds.

Fuller UltraShift™automated shifting systems are available on all transmissions from 9- to 18-speeds.

Allison RD series 6-speed transmissions is available. The RDS is a fully automatic planetary gear transmission with a lock-up torque converter.

== Frame ==
A ladder frame with beam axles is used and the front axle is set forward on semi-elliptical leaf springs. The set-back axle version was replaced by the Anthem in 2017.

The base rear suspension is a Mack tandem (two powered axles) but other axle/suspension combinations are available. Wheelbases are from 166 to 247 inches (420 to 630 cm).

Meritor supplies S-cam air brakes, steering systems, driveshafts, and other components. Front air disc brakes are available.

== Axles ==
Front axles are available with 12,000 or 14,000 pounds (5,400 or 6,400 kg) rating.

Mack powered axles have the drive carrier on top of the housing. This lets the driveshafts be in line from the transmission to and between the axles at a higher level above the ground. With the higher level above the ground the driveshafts and u-joints are less prone to dirt and damage, which is important in on/off-road construction.

The Twin Y air suspension is base. It has trailing arms that fork to the rear and attach to both the top and bottom of the axle. There is an air bag behind the axle. Each axle is sprung individually. They are rated at 40,000 pounds (18,000 kg).

The Camelback tandem (two powered axles) was offered in earlier models. This has multiple leaves mounted above the bogey pivot which curve down and under the axles.

Vendor spring and air-ride axle/suspension combinations are rated up to 40,000 pounds (18,000 kg).

== Applications ==
The Pinnacle's set-forward front axle and high rectangular grille make it high drag and not well-suited for long-distance hauling. It is available with a sleeper but it is commonly used as a day cab for local and regional hauling, where local laws and conditions restrict length or affect weight distribution.

The Pinnacle has a high ground clearance, a strong chassis, and available components for on/off-road construction. It is suited for dump, flatbed, and lowboy use.

On-highway markets for Mack are freight, bulk materials, and farm products like grain and livestock.
