= Volvo VN =

Heavy-duty truck

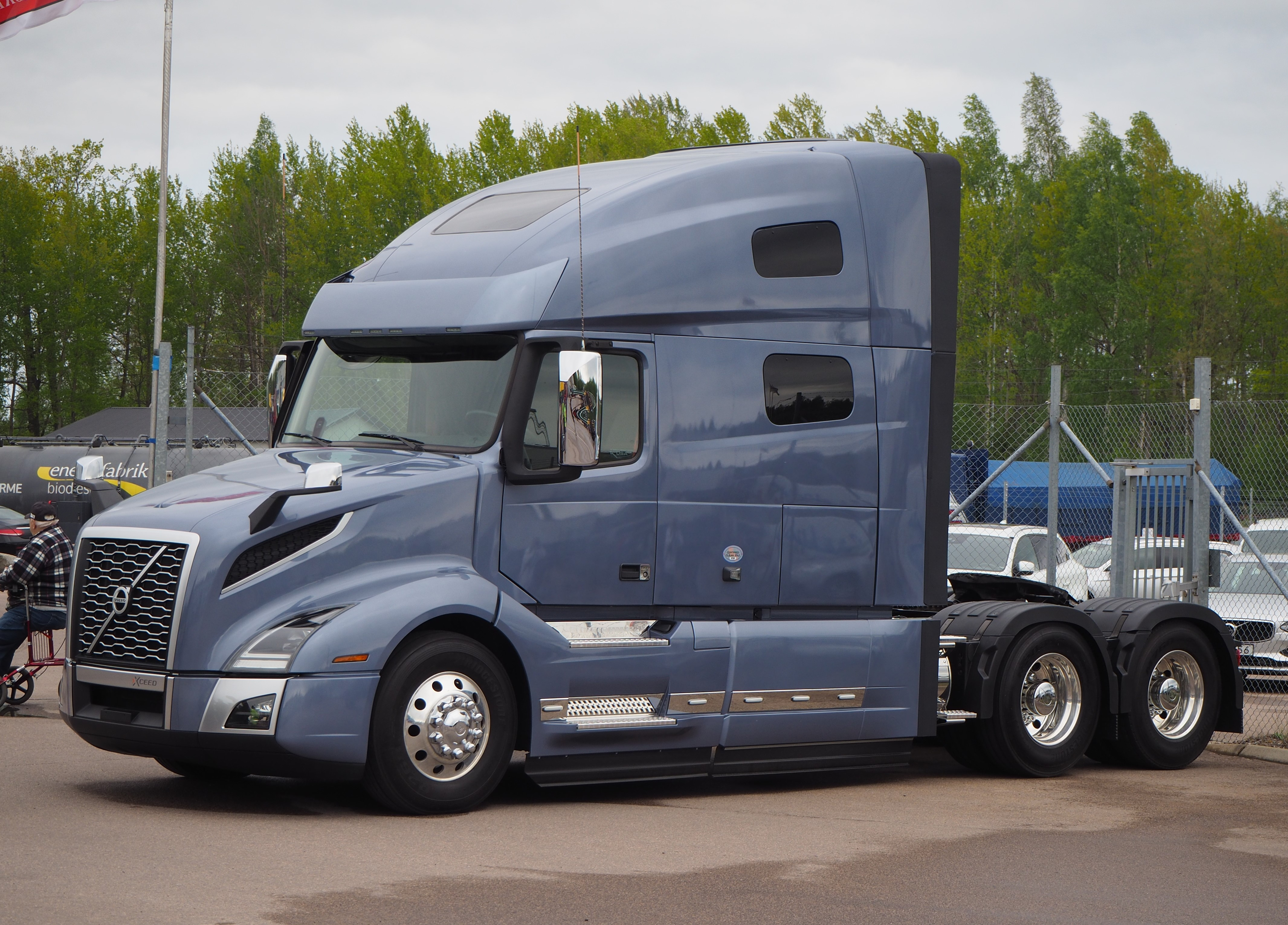

Overview
- Manufacturer: Volvo Trucks North America
- Also called: VN Series
- Production: 1996–present
- Assembly: United States: Dublin, Virginia (New River Valley Assembly Plant)

Body and chassis
- Class: Class 8 heavy-duty tractor
- Body style: Conventional daycab, sleeper
- Layout: RWD single or tandem axle
- Related: Volvo FH/FM

Powertrain
- Engine: Caterpillar Inc. 3406E; Cummins ISX15, N-14, Signature 600; Detroit Diesel Series 60; Volvo D11, 12, 13 and 16
- Transmission: Eaton Corporation Fuller Manual 9, 10, Super 10, 13, 18-speed, 10-speed AutoShift, Ultrashift PLUS, Advantage Automated Volvo I-Shift 12-speed

Dimensions
- Wheelbase: 186"–243"
- Length: 18'–25'
- Width: 96"–100"
- Height: 10'–12'
- Curb weight: 13,000–18,000 lbs.

Chronology
- Predecessor: Volvo WIA

The Volvo VN (also known as the Volvo VNL) is a heavy-duty truck produced by the Swedish vehicle manufacturer Volvo Trucks. Initially developed in North America, it was introduced in 1996 as the second generation Volvo Class 8 tractor. For the 2000 model year, the VN was officially renamed VNL. Other models included the VNM (until 2017) and the VNR (from 2017).

The "L" in VNL signifies a long bonnet, compared to the medium-bonneted VNM and the regional VNR. Other parts of the model name (for example, VNL64T760) include the number of wheels and wheels driven ("64"), followed by a "T" for tractor, followed by a three-digit code for the cab style. The 300 cab is a day cab and the 400 is a short sleeper, with 640/660/740/760/780 representing various full sleeper cabs with flat or high roofs.

It was the first Volvo commercial vehicle to be assembled in the United States after the discontinuation of the WhiteGMC brand (although Volvo did not purchase the remainder of General Motors' interests in truck tractors until 1997, rechristening its U.S. truck division from Volvo GM to Volvo Trucks North America). It is currently available exclusively for the North American market.

In 2013 Volvo Trucks added the VNX, the highest model in the VN series.

== First generation (1996–2024) ==
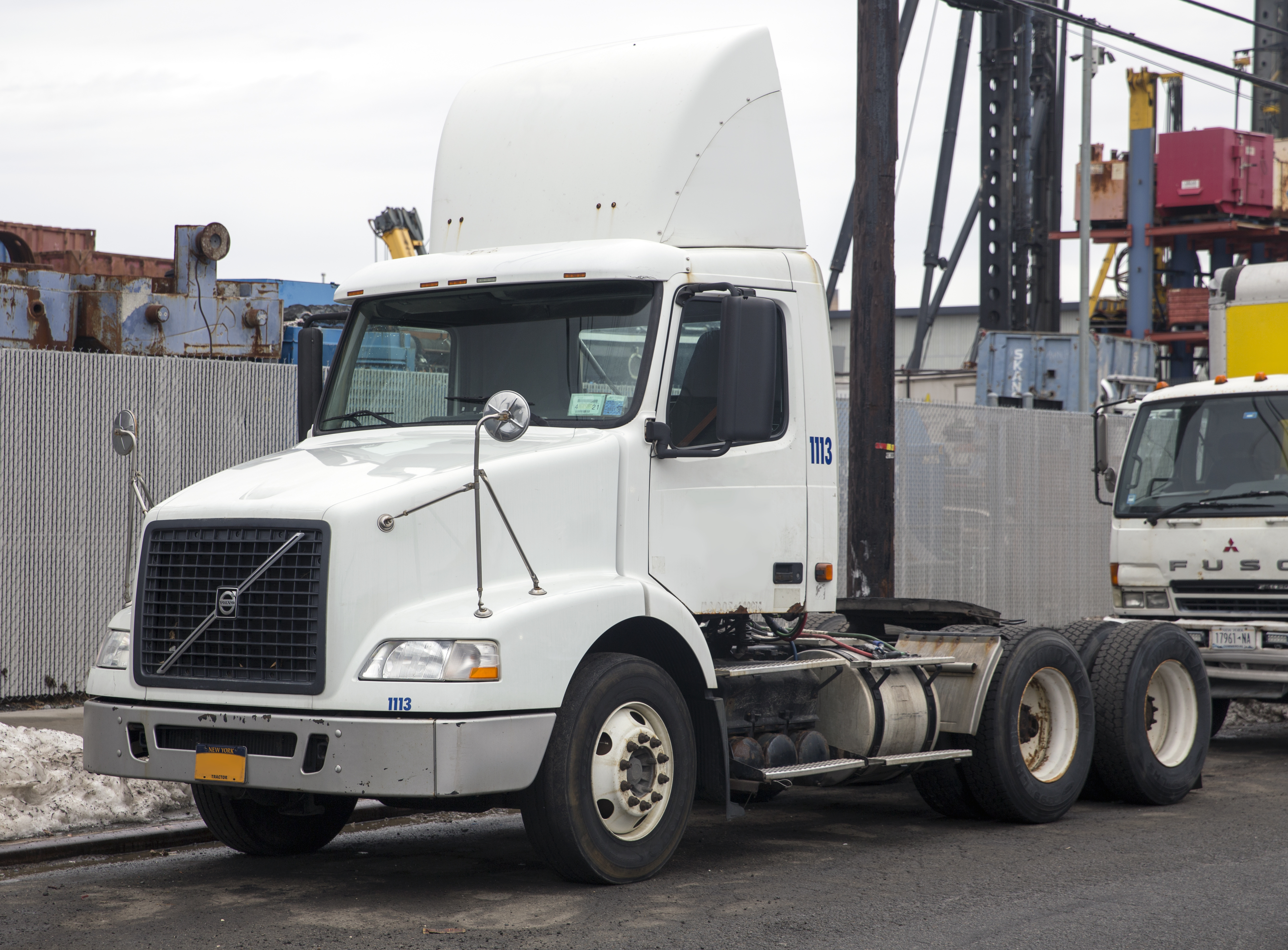
2002 Volvo VNL64T300 daycab

The first generation Volvo VN series was produced from 1996 to 2024, and manufactured exclusively in the United States at Volvo Trucks' New River Valley Plant in Dublin, Virginia. It was developed alongside a new generation of European Volvo trucks (FH, FM, and NH), while also incorporating know-how from the previous White-GMC designs. Having been developed in tandem with the European truck family, the VN cab was also designed to meet the Swedish Cab Safety test procedure, a stricter standard than that required for North American-market trucks. The VN was also about 1,100 lb (500 kg) lighter than the previous Volvo conventional truck, the WI. The VN was renamed VNL in 2000, to distinguish it from the shorter VNM (intended for regional and work duty rather than long haul operations) which appeared concurrently.

The first generation of the VN family received two major facelifts.

=== 2003 update ===
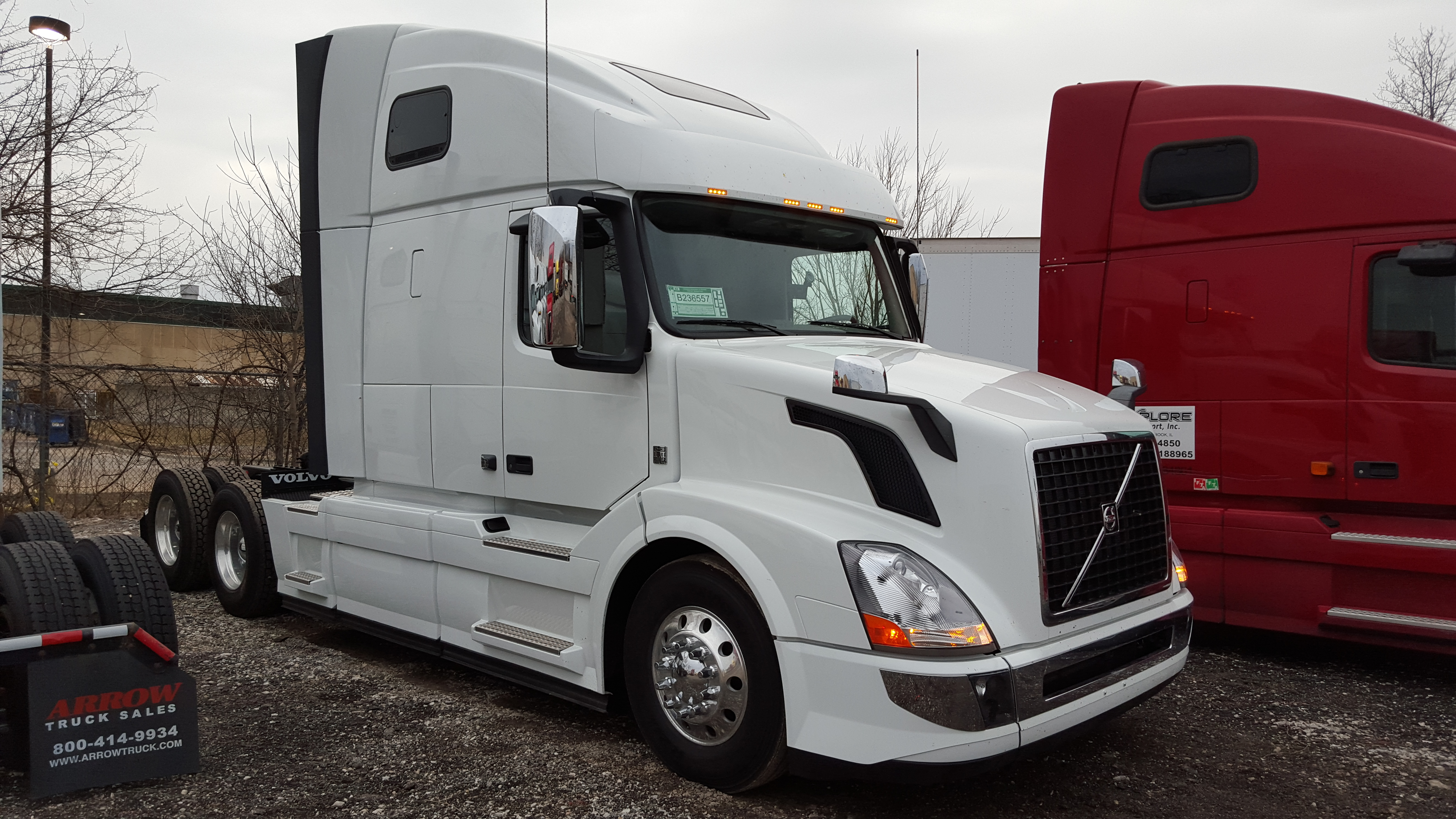
2016 Volvo VNL670 (first facelift)

In August 2002, for the 2003 model year, the first facelift of the first generation model was introduced. About 400 lb (180 kg) lighter than the previous generation, it received a revised hood, trapezoidal headlamps, new fairings, and redesigned interior. The new design paid close attention to aerodynamics; aside from the smoother overall design, the cab was relocated to shrink the gap between the cab and the trailer to further decrease drag. Series production and deliveries to customers began in November of the same year.

The entire engine lineup was now compliant with EPA's 2002 requirements: Aside from Volvo's own 12-liter engine, related to the ones used in the European line, the VN-series was also available with the 15-liter Cummins ISX diesel. Power outputs ranged from 365 to 465 hp (272 to 347 kW) for the in-house option and from 400 to 565 hp (298 to 421 kW) for the Cummins unit. From 2005, the VN could also be equipped with Volvo's largest, 16-liter engine.

=== 2018 update ===
On July 11, 2017, Volvo Trucks launched the redesigned 2018 VNL series at the event in Greensboro, North Carolina. On September 25, 2017, the display of the new 2018 VNL series to a public audience occurred at the 1st annual North American Commercial Vehicle Show held in Atlanta, Georgia. The new design brought aerodynamic improvements, a new dashboard, and a reclining bunk in the sleeper.

Available engines are Volvo's D11 and D13, as well as the Cummins X15.

=== VNX ===
The VNX is the vocational model in the VN series. Launched in 2013, it came standard with the Volvo D16 engine – which delivers up to 600 horsepower (450 kW) and 2,050 pound-feet (2,780 N⋅m) of torque – and I-Shift automated manual transmission, and was initially available with 6×4 and 8×4 axle configurations; an 18-speed manual transmission was also offered as an option. An 8×6 axle configuration was offered from 2015.

After the D16 was discontinued in January 2017, the VNX was relaunched in March 2018, which Volvo states is "much more purpose-built for [vocational use]". The updated VNX offers several improvements, such as chassis modifications and longer fifth-wheel slides. The truck is available with the D13 and Cummins X15 Performance engines, as well as 13- and 14-speed I-Shift transmissions with crawler gears (D13 only) and 13- and 18-speed Eaton Fuller manual transmissions (all engines).

=== VNR Electric ===
In December 2020, Volvo launched the VNR Electric, a battery-electric version of the VN regional truck. Maximum range is rated at 150 miles (240 km) from a 264 kWh battery. As of mid-2023 the batteries can be optioned as 600 V, 375 or 565 kWh. The batteries support 250 kW DC charging on CCS1 or CCS2.

== Second generation (2024–present) ==
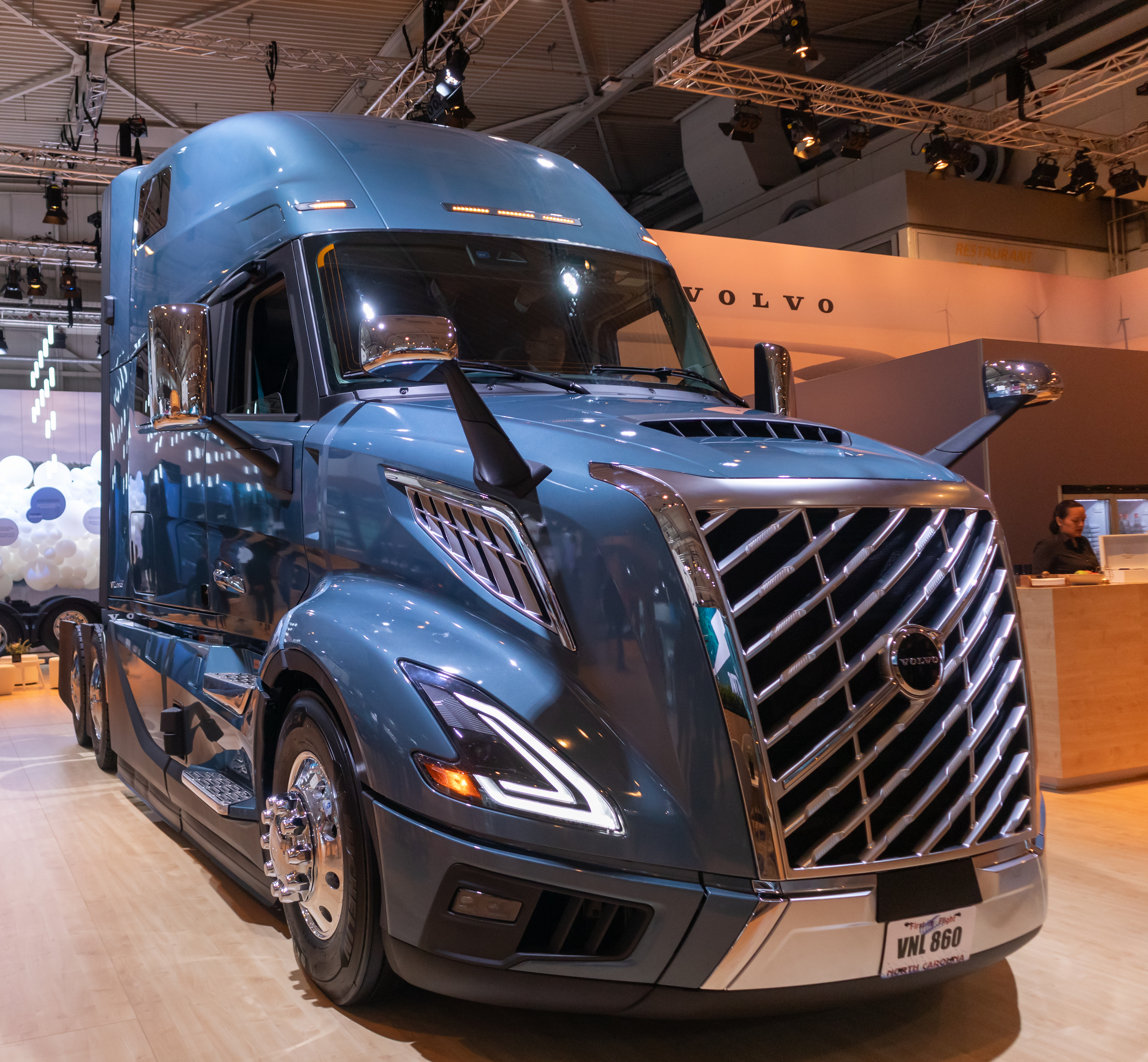
VNL semi-trailer tractor at IAA Transportation 2024

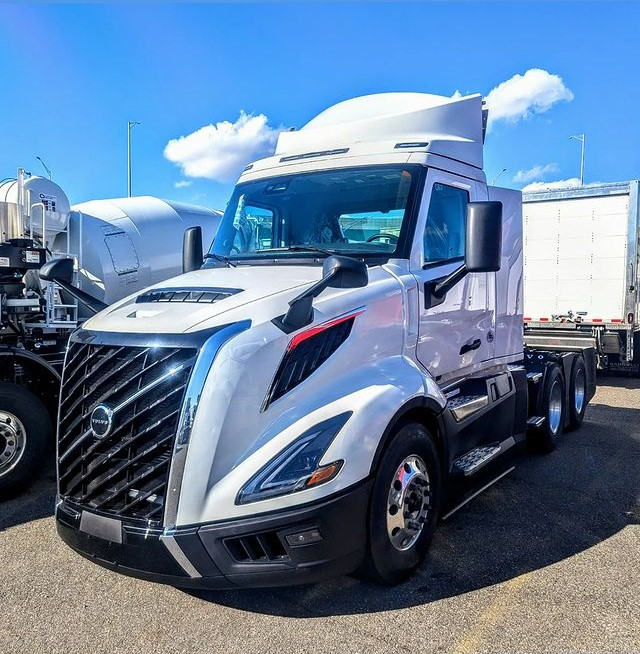
2025 Volvo VNL 300 Day cab Edge trim in glacier white

On January 23, 2024, Volvo Trucks unveiled the second-generation VNL. The redesigned model features upgrades such as digital mirrors and a full digital dash display, alongside numerous safety and aerodynamic enhancements. The truck is offered with the D13 engine with four power options between 405 and 500 horsepower (302 and 373 kW), and three torque options between 1,750 and 1,950 pound-feet (2,370 and 2,640 N⋅m). The new VNL also features an updated I-Shift transmission, which Volvo Trucks states shifts 30% faster.

The second-generation VNL features four trim options: Core, Edge, Edge Black, and Ultimate. Six cab configurations are offered, including a day cab, 42-, 64- and 74-inch sleeper lengths, and two sleeper heights: Mid-Roof for all lengths and Full-Height for the 64- and 74-inch lengths only.

Production commenced at New River Valley plant on October 3, 2024.

=== VNL Electric ===
On June 20, 2024, Volvo Trucks teased a prototype of a battery-electric version of the VNL.
