= Mack Anthem =

Trucks designed for highway use

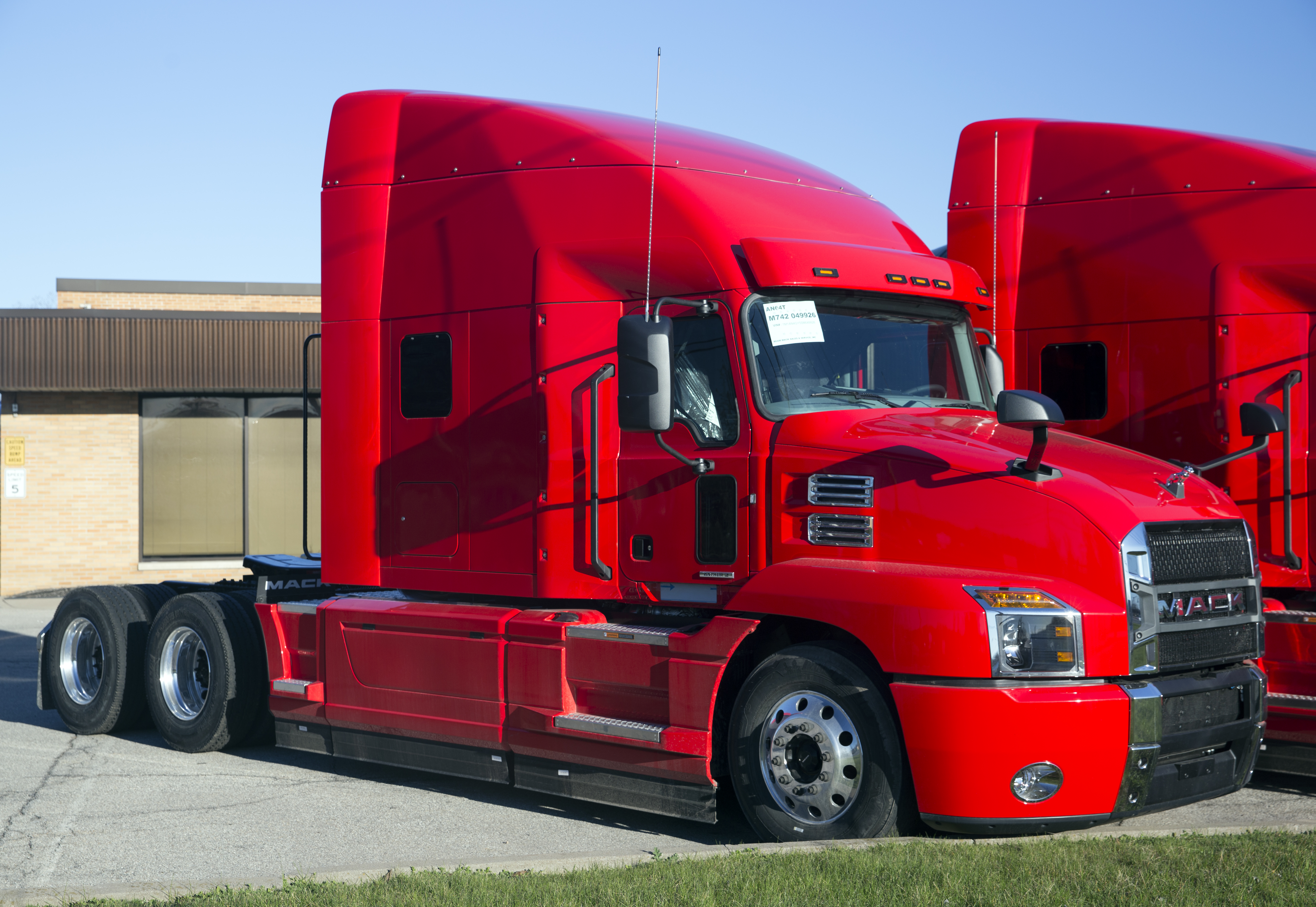
- First generation model

Overview
- Manufacturer: Mack Trucks
- Production: 2018–present

Body and chassis
- Class: Truck (Class 8)

Powertrain
- Engine: Diesel: 659 cu in (10.8 L) MP7 turbo I6; 783 cu in (12.8 L) MP8 turbo I6; 783 cu in (12.8 L) MP8HE turbo I6; Natural gas: 762 cu in (12.5 L) Cummins ISX12N turbo I6
- Transmission: 8–18-speed Mack manual; 12/13/14-speed Mack mDRIVE automated manual; 9–18-speed Fuller UltraShift automated manual; 6-speed Allison automatic

Chronology
- Predecessor: Pinnacle SBA
- Successor: Mack Pioneer (Long haul use)

The Mack Anthem is a series of heavy duty (Class 8) trucks built by Mack Trucks over 2 generations since 2018. It has a long low-drag hood and fenders. It is designed primarily for highway use.

== Design ==
The Anthem is a long-hood conventional. Designed for highway use, it can have a day cab or two different sleeper compartments. It has aerodynamic aids standards and others are available. Normally a 6x4 (3 axles, 2 powered), there are also 6x2 (3 axles, one powered) models. Total loaded weight can be up to 62,000 pounds (28,000 kg) and 80,000 pounds (36,000 kg) including all trailers.

Advanced electronics are used for engine, chassis, and body controls, as well as maintenance.

In 2019 a new generation Bendix Wingman Fusion was available in the Anthem. It uses radar and cameras to provide emergency braking, lane departure, and blind spot warnings.

Mack builds their own major components (engines, transmissions, axles, and suspensions) and promotes an integrated design. Most vendor components are also available, but engine choice is very limited.

In 2025, a new generation was introduced.

== Engines ==
The Anthem is available with three Mack diesels, the MP7, MP8, and MP8HE. A Cummins Westport ISX12N natural gas engine is also available

The Mack MP7 is the base engine in the Anthem. It is a 659-cubic-inch (10.8 L) overhead cam turbocharged inline six-cylinder diesel engine. It develops 325 to 425 horsepower (242 to 317 kW) and 1,260 to 1,560 pound force-feet (1,710 to 2,120 N⋅m) of torque.

The Mack MP8 engine is a 783-cubic-inch (12.8 L) overhead cam turbocharged inline six-cylinder diesel engine. It develops 434 to 505 horsepower (324 to 377 kW) and 1,460 to 1,760 pound force-feet (1,980 to 2,390 N⋅m) of torque.

The Mack MP8HE engine is a variant of the MP8 with a mechanical drive behind the turbocharger in the exhaust stream. This allows more heat energy to be used for better fuel economy.

The Cummins Westport ISX12N is a 762-cubic-inch (12.5 L) overhead cam turbocharged inline six-cylinder natural gas engine. It develops 400 horsepower (300 kW) and 1,450 pound force-feet (1,970 N⋅m) of torque.

== Transmissions ==
All Mack transmissions have aluminum cases and three countershafts. Both Mack and Fuller have manual and automated shifting models. Allison transmissions are available as fully automatic only.

Mack mDRIVE automated manual is the base transmission. It has no clutch pedal and shifts itself on demand. The driver can override it but it is normally driven in "D". It can have 12, 13, or 14-speeds. Other Mack manual transmissions have 8-18 speeds.

Eaton-Fuller UltraShift automated shifting systems are available on all of their transmissions from 9- to 18-speeds.

Allison RDS series 6-speed transmission is available. The RDS is a fully automatic planetary gear transmission with a lock-up torque converter.

== Frame ==
A ladder frame with beam axles is used. There is a single front axle on semi-elliptical leaf springs. The base rear suspension is a Mack tandem with two powered axles, a single rear drive axle with an undriven pusher axle is available. Wheelbases are from 174 to 203 inches (440 to 520 cm)

A set-back front axle is used. Set back axles, where the hood extends in front of the axle, are used when overall length is not important. They let the fenders and bumper taper back to the tires, allowing less wind drag.

In 2020 Mack introduced the Command Steer system. An additional on-demand electric power steering system on top of the hydraulic system. This allows easier steering, will help dampen steering feedback, steady driving, and can compensate for side-winds, uneven pavement, and braking on different surfaces. A very light feel and automatic return-to-center feature are useful off-road, at slow speed, and in backing.

Dana-Spicer and Meritor supply air brakes, driveshafts, and other components.

== Axles ==
Front axles are available in 12,000 and 14,000 pounds (5,400 and 6,400 kg) ratings from Mack, Dana-Spicer, and Meritor.

Mack powered axles have the drive carrier on top of the housing instead of the front of it like other manufacturers. This lets the driveshafts be in line from the transmission to and between the axles.

Other powered axles are available from Dana-Spicer and Meritor. These have front mounted carriers and in tandemsthe two axle housings are different.

The mRIDE tandem has tapered leaves that rock above the bogey pivot then go out and above the axles. Struts go from the bottom of the bogey pivot out and under the axle. They are rated at 40,000, 46,000, and 52,000 pounds (18,000, 21,000, and 24,000 kg).

The Twin Y air suspension has trailing arms that fork to the rear and attach to both the top and bottom of the axle. There is an air bag behind the axle. Each axle is sprung individually. They are rated at 40,000 pounds (18,000 kg).

A Liftable pusher axle is used in a 6x2 arrangement, where only the rear axle is driven. They are lighter, have less drag, and can be raised when not needed. This allows better fuel economy and longer tire life.

Other tandems with mechanical or air suspensions are available from Mack, Chalmers, and Hendrickson.

== Applications ==
The Anthem is designed as a fuel-efficient highway semi-tractor only.

Regional service is when runs are one day long. Regional tractors usually have a day cab, short wheelbase, and are often used for fleet service. They often can be used with a lower power engines and/or a 6x2 (three axles, rear only driven) arrangement.

Over-the-road is when one or two drivers live in the cab for extended periods. Over-the-road tractors are often owned by their drivers. With sleeper compartments and longer wheelbases they usually need more powerful engines than regional tractors.
