= Truck classification =

Commercial classifications of trucks

Truck classifications are typically based upon the maximum loaded weight of the truck, typically using the gross vehicle weight rating (GVWR) and sometimes also the gross trailer weight rating (GTWR), and can vary among jurisdictions.

== United States ==
In the United States, commercial truck classification is determined based on the vehicle's gross vehicle weight rating (GVWR). The classes are numbered 1 through 8. Trucks are also classified more broadly by the Federal Highway Administration (FHWA), which groups classes 1 and 2 as light duty, 3 through 6 as medium duty, and 7 and 8 as heavy duty. The Environmental Protection Agency (EPA) has a separate system of emissions classifications for trucks. The United States Census Bureau also assigned classifications in its Vehicle Inventory and Use Survey (VIUS) (formerly Truck Inventory and Use Survey (TIUS)).

United States federal law requires drivers to have a commercial driver's license (CDL) to operate heavy-duty vehicles (Class 7 and 8) in commerce, with the exception of emergency vehicles and vehicles strictly used for recreational and/or agricultural purposes, though it allows states to require a CDL for these vehicles under their discretion. A CDL is also required to operate any vehicle that transports at least 16 passengers (including the driver) or hazardous materials requiring placards under federal and state law regardless of the weight of the vehicle. States may extend CDL requirements for additional vehicles, for example, New York requires a CDL to operate a stretched limousine and California requires a CDL for any vehicle with three or more axles that has a gross vehicle weight rating of over 6,000 pounds.

=== Table of US GVWR classifications ===
US truck class	Duty classification	Weight limit	Examples
Class 1	Light duty	0–6,000 pounds (0–2,722 kg)	Chevrolet Colorado/GMC Canyon, Ford Ranger, Honda Ridgeline FWD, Jeep Gladiator, Nissan Navara/Frontier, Toyota Tacoma
Class 2a	Light duty	6,001–8,500 pounds (2,722–3,856 kg)	Chevrolet Silverado/GMC Sierra 1500, Ford F-150, Honda Ridgeline AWD, Ram 1500, Nissan Titan, Toyota Tundra
Class 2b	Light duty	8,501–10,000 pounds (3,856–4,536 kg)	Chevrolet Silverado/GMC Sierra 2500, Ford F-250, Nissan Titan XD, Ram 2500, Tesla Cybertruck
Class 3	Medium duty	10,001–14,000 pounds (4,536–6,350 kg)	Chevrolet Silverado/GMC Sierra 3500, Ford F-350, Ford F-450 (pickup only), Ram 3500, Isuzu NPR
Class 4	Medium duty	14,001–16,000 pounds (6,351–7,257 kg)	Chevrolet Silverado 4500HD/International CV, Ford F-450 (chassis cab only), Ram 4500, Isuzu NPR-HD
Class 5	Medium duty	16,001–19,500 pounds (7,258–8,845 kg)	Chevrolet Silverado 5500HD/International CV, Ford F-550, Ram 5500, Isuzu NRR, Freightliner Business Class M2 106
Class 6	Medium duty	19,501–26,000 pounds (8,846–11,793 kg)	Chevrolet Silverado 6500HD/International CV, Ford F-650, Freightliner Business Class M2 106, International MV
Class 7	Heavy duty	26,001–33,000 pounds (11,794–14,969 kg)	Autocar ACMD, Freightliner Business Class M2 106, Ford F-750, Hino 338, International MV
Class 8	Heavy duty	33,001–80,000 pounds (14,969–36,287 kg) and above	Volvo Truck VNL; Freightliner Cascadia, Business Class M2 112, and EconicSD; Ford F-750; Hino XL8; International LT; Mack Anthem, Granite, Pinnacle, and TerraPro; Tesla Semi; Nikola Tre; Peterbilt 379; Spartan; Ferrara; KME custom fire apparatus

=== Notes on weight classes ===
==== "Ton" rating ====
When light-duty trucks were first produced in the United States, they were rated by their payload capacity in tons: 1/2 (1000 pounds), 3/4 (1500 pounds) and 1-ton (2000 pounds). Ford had introduced the "One-Tonner" in 1938 to their line of trucks. The "Three-quarter-tonner" appeared in the Ford truck lineup in 1939. Over time, payload capacities for most domestic pickup trucks have increased while the ton titles have stayed the same. The 1948 Ford F-1 had a Gross Vehicle Weight Rating (GVWR) of 4700 pounds. The truck was marketed with a "Nominal Tonnage Rating: Half-Ton." The actual cargo capacity had increased to 1450 pounds. Ford adopted this promotional nomenclature in 1948 to assist buyers, sellers, and users. The now-imprecise ton rating has continued since the post World War II era to compare standard sizes, rather than actual capacities. In 1975, a change in U.S. emission laws required any vehicle under 6000 pounds GVWR to burn unleaded fuel. U.S. pickup truck manufacturers responded with a "heavy half" pickup of over 6000 pounds GVWR. The F-150 had a capacity of over 2000 pounds, compared to 1500 pounds for the F-100.

This has led to categorizing trucks similarly, even if their payload capacities are different. The Chevrolet Silverado/GMC Sierra 1500, Ford F-150, Nissan Titan, Ram 1500, and Toyota Tundra are called "half-ton" pickups (1/2-ton). The Chevrolet Silverado/GMC Sierra 2500, Ford F-250, and Ram 2500 are called "three-quarter-ton" pickups. The Chevrolet Silverado/GMC Sierra 3500, Ford F-350, and Ram 3500 are known as "one ton" pickups.

Similar schemes exist for vans and SUVs (e.g. a 1-ton Dodge Van or a 1/2-ton GMC Suburban), medium duty trucks (e.g. the 1 1/2-ton Ford F-550) and some military vehicles, like the ubiquitous deuce-and-a-half.

==== Heavy duty pickup truck ====
Some pickup trucks may be marketed as heavy-duty (eg Ram Heavy Duty), Super Duty (eg Ford Super Duty), or simply "HD" (eg Chevrolet Silverado/GMC Sierra HD). This is not to be confused with the truck classification of classes 7 and 8 being heavy-duty.

==== Class 8 ====
The Class 8 truck gross vehicle weight rating (GVWR) is a vehicle with a GVWR exceeding 33,000 lb (14,969 kg). These include tractor trailer tractors, single-unit dump trucks of a GVWR over 33,000 lb, as well as non-commercial chassis fire trucks; such trucks typically have 3 or more axles. The typical 5-axle tractor-trailer combination, also called a "semi" or "18-wheeler", is a Class 8 vehicle. Standard trailers vary in length from 8 ft (2.4 m) containers to 57 ft (17 m) van trailers, with the most common length being the 53 ft (16 m) trailer. Specialized trailers for oversized loads can be considerably longer. Commercial operation of a Class 8 vehicle in the United States requires either a Class-B CDL for non-combination vehicles, or a Class-A CDL for combination vehicles (tractor-trailers). Industries that generally use Class 8 trucks are long-distance freight transportation, construction, and heavy equipment moving.

== Canada ==
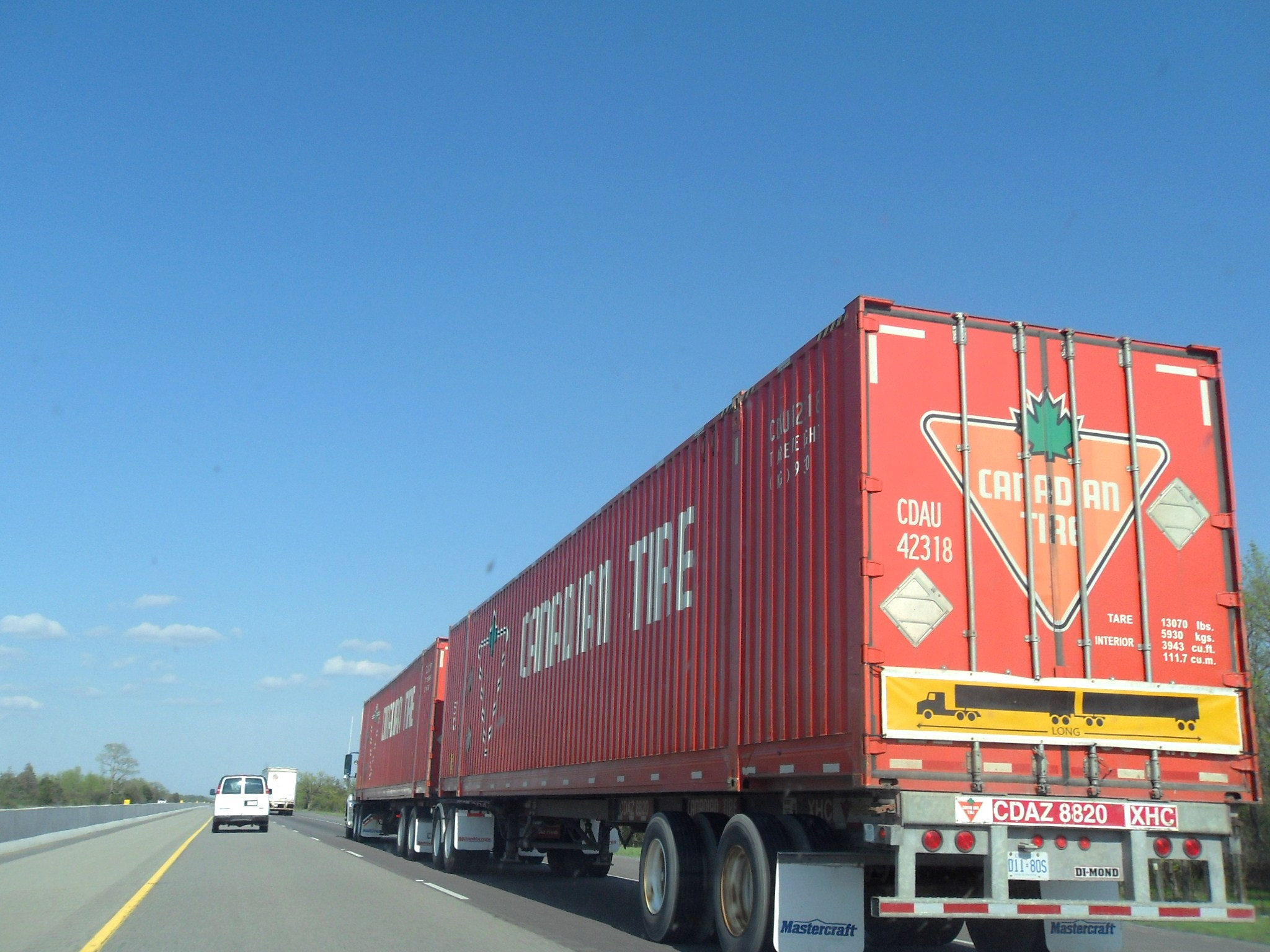
53 foot container turnpike doubles

Vehicle classifications vary among provinces in Canada, due to "differences in size and weight regulations, economic activity, physical environment, and other issues". While several provinces use their own classification schemes for traffic monitoring, Manitoba, Ontario, Prince Edward Island and Saskatchewan have adopted the 13-class system from the United States' Federal Highway Administration—sometimes with modifications, or in Ontario's case, for limited purposes. British Columbia and Ontario also distinguish between short- and long-combination trucks. In accident reporting, eight jurisdictions subdivide trucks by GVWR into light and heavy classes at approximately 4500 kg (9921 lb).

== European Union and United Kingdom ==
Vehicle categories on a European driving licence include (among others) B for general motor vehicles, C for large goods vehicles, D for large passenger vehicles (buses), and are limited by the Gross Vehicle Weight Rating and number of passenger seats.

The general categories are further divided as follows:

1. appending the number 1 to the licence class C or D denotes the "light" versions of said class (e.g., Minibus, or medium truck).
2. appending the letter E allows for trailers of larger Gross Trailer Weight Rating (GTWR) than permitted by the standard licence category.

For the "trailer" categories, a separate driving test is generally required (e.g., "C", and "CE" require separate tests).

The classifications used on the International Driving Permit are similar to the European model.

The licence categories that deal with trucks are B and C:

- Class B permits the use of vehicles with GVWRs of not more than 3500 kg plus a trailer with GTWR not exceeding 750 kg; or, a trailer above this limit so long as the combined gross weight of car and trailer does not exceed 3500 kg (in some jurisdictions a higher combined weight limit of 4250 kg is permitted after a theoretical and practical course of seven hours, but this permission is not transferable between EU countries). Class B covers both standard passenger cars of all sizes as well as vehicles that are specifically designed for transport of goods. The latter are commonly known as light commercial vehicles (LCVs), and include vans such as the Ford Transit, Mercedes-Benz Sprinter and Fiat Ducato, as well as pickup trucks such as the Ford Ranger or Mitsubishi Triton.
- Class BE allows a trailers of up to 3500 kg GTWR to be used while driving a class B vehicle.
- Class C1 raises the GVWR limit to 7500 kg and permits a trailer with GTWR not exceeding 750 kg.
- Class C removes the GVWR limit of Class C1, but the GTWR limit for the trailer of 750 kg remains. (This often referred to as a "Rigid Heavy Goods Vehicle" or "Rigid truck" licence)
- Class C1E allows for a class B or C1 vehicle and a trailer of more than 750 kg GTWR, so long as the combined gross weight does not exceed 12000 kg.
- Class CE removes all weight limits for a Class C vehicle with trailer. (known as an "Articulated Heavy Goods Vehicle", or often simply "HGV", licence )

== China ==
Limit of masses For more information, see GB 1589-2016

Jurisdiction (border crossings)	Type	Axles	Weigh limit
China only	Rigid	2	18,000 kg (40,000 lb)
China only	Rigid	3	25,000 kg (55,000 lb)
China only	Rigid	4	32,000 kg (71,000 lb)
China only	Non-rigid	4	36,000 kg (79,000 lb)
China only	Non-rigid	5	40,000 kg (88,000 lb)
China only	Non-rigid	6	40,000 kg (88,000 lb)
China/Kazakhstan	Rigid	5	38,000 kg (84,000 lb)
China/Pakistan	Rigid	5	43,000 kg (95,000 lb)
China/Russia	Non-rigid	6	44,000 kg (97,000 lb)
China/Pakistan	Non-rigid	6	49,000 kg (108,000 lb)

== List of truck types ==
- Box truck
- Cab over
- Cab chassis
- Concrete mixer
- Conversion van
- Dump truck
- Flatbed truck
- Fire truck
- Logging truck
- Panel van
- Platform truck
- Pickup truck
- Refuse truck
- Semi tractor
- Tow truck

== Gallery ==
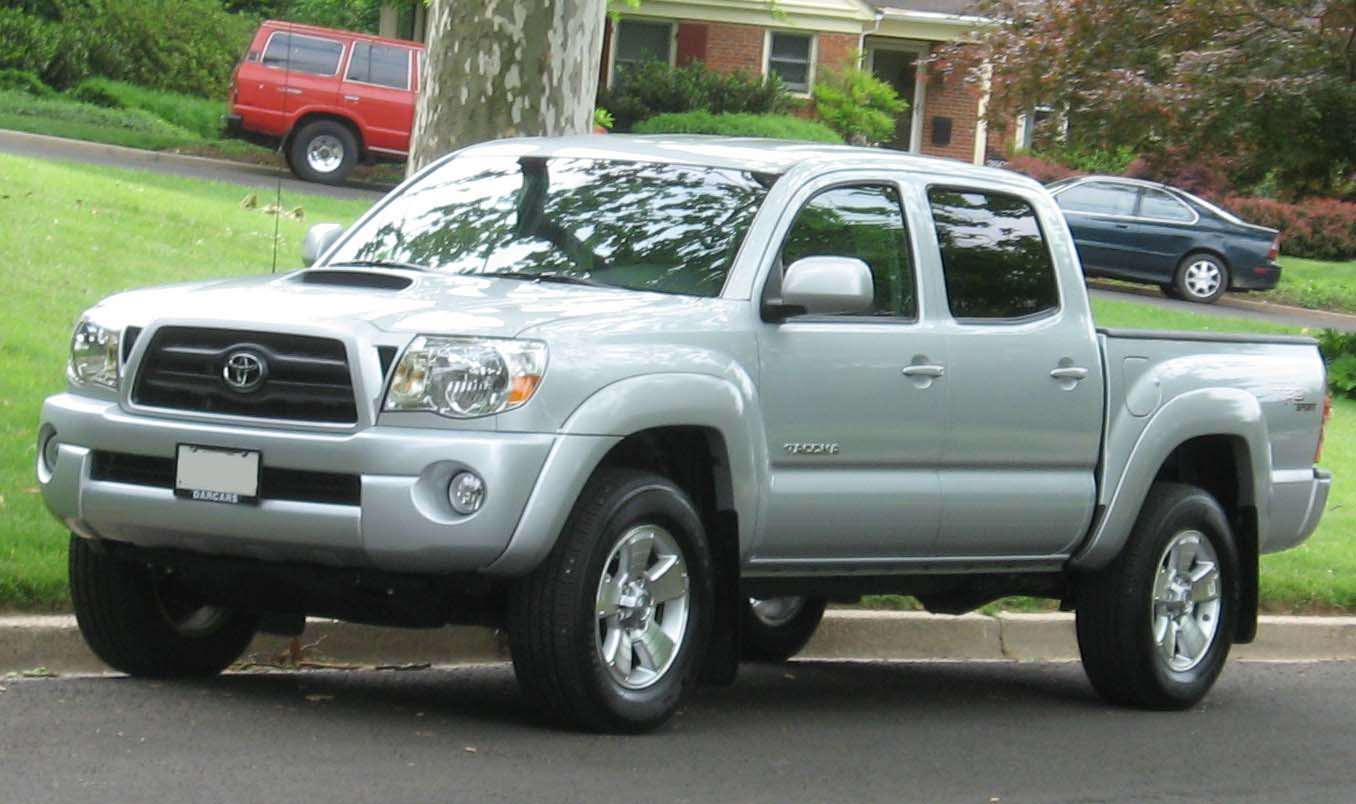
Class 1 Light duty Toyota Tacoma

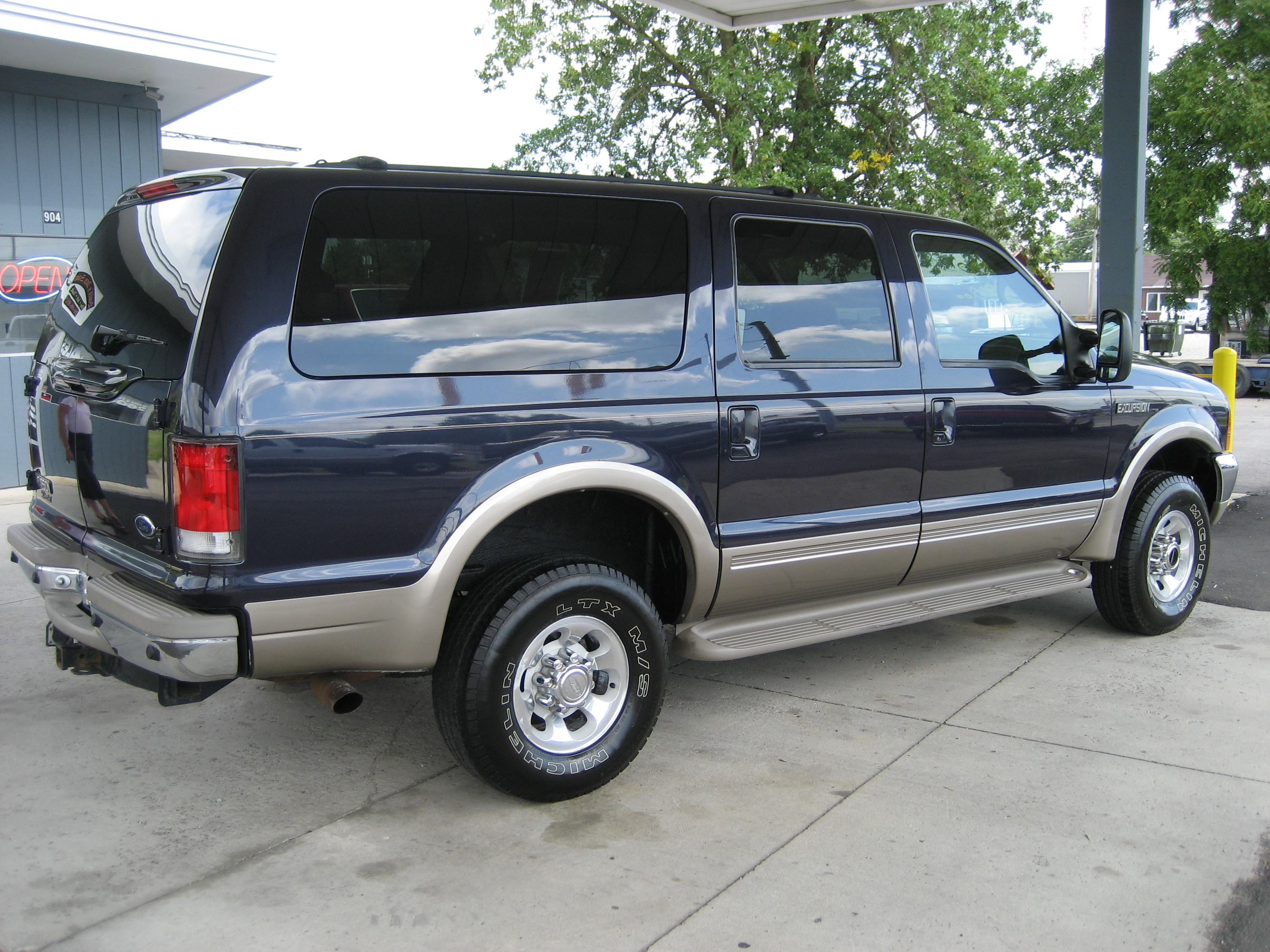
Class 2 2001 Ford Excursion 4×4 (GVWR: 8,600 pounds (3.9 t)

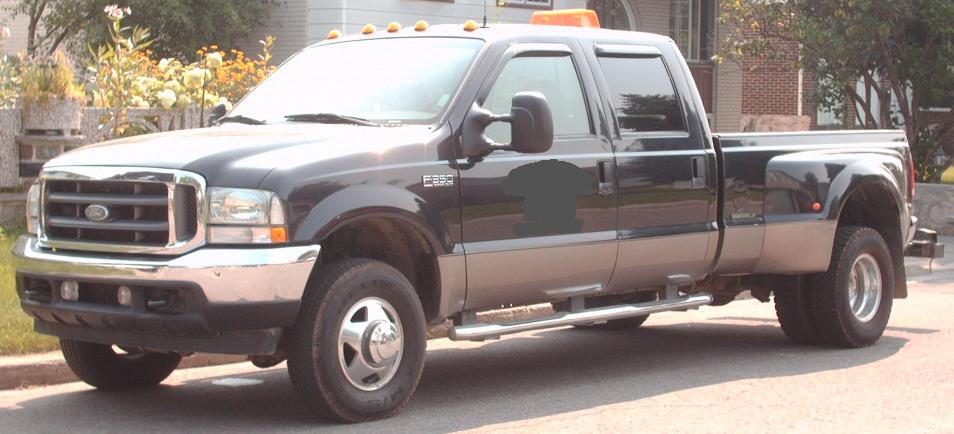
Class 3 Ford F-350

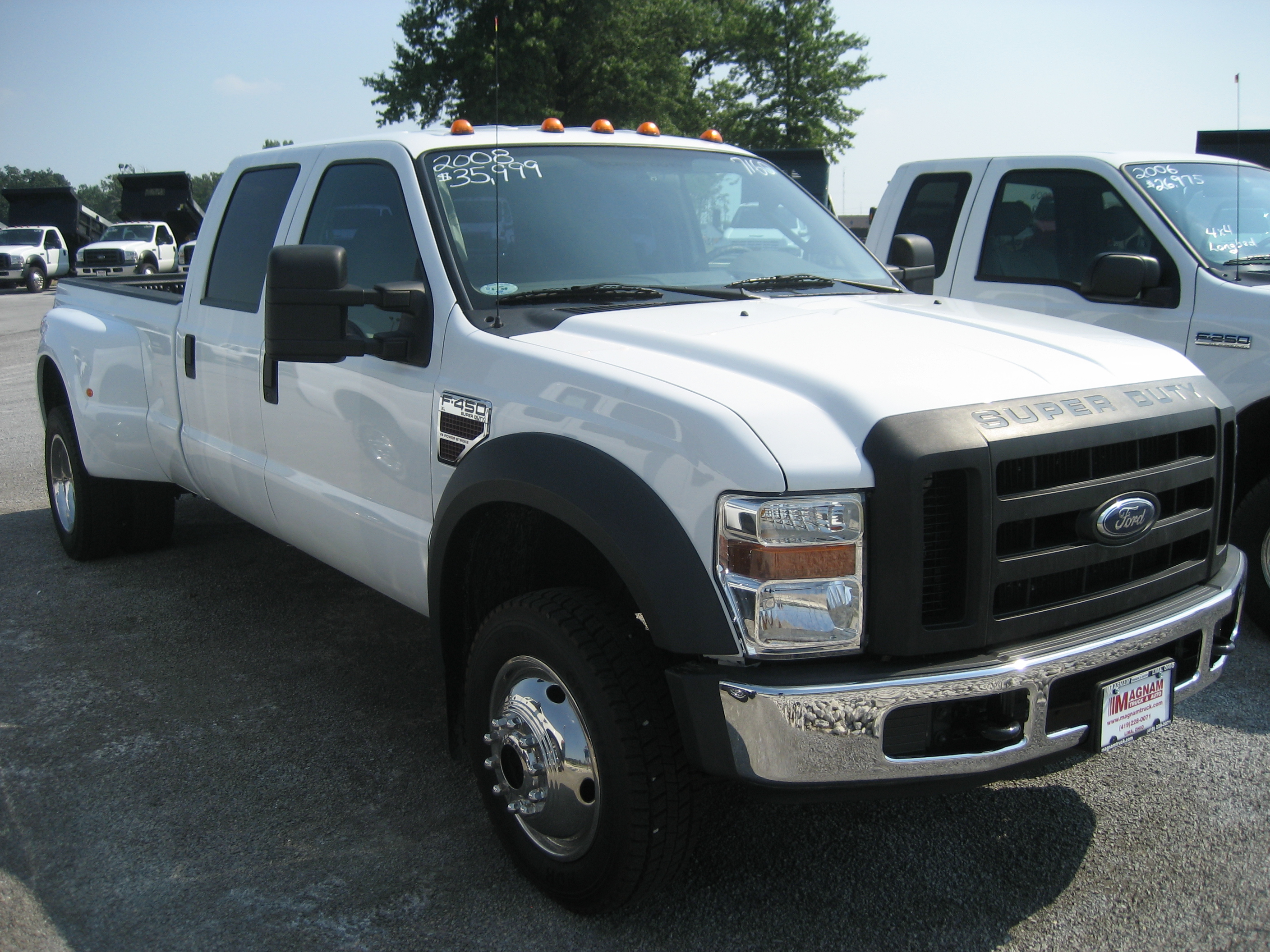
Class 4 2008 Ford F-450 4×4 pick-up truck (GVWR: 14,500 pounds (6.6 t))

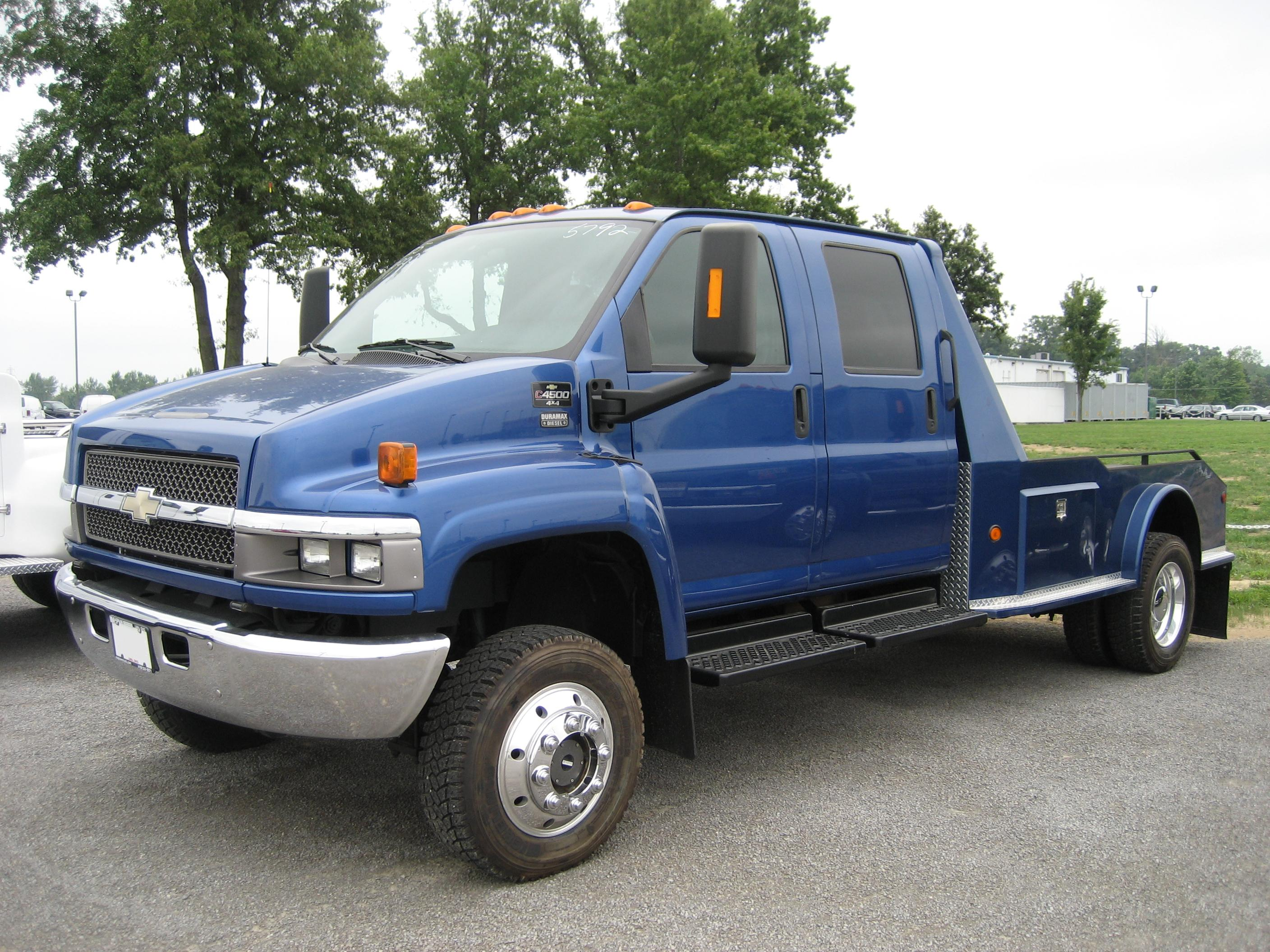
Class 5 2005 Chevy Kodiak 4×4 (GVWR: 17,500 pounds (7.9 t))

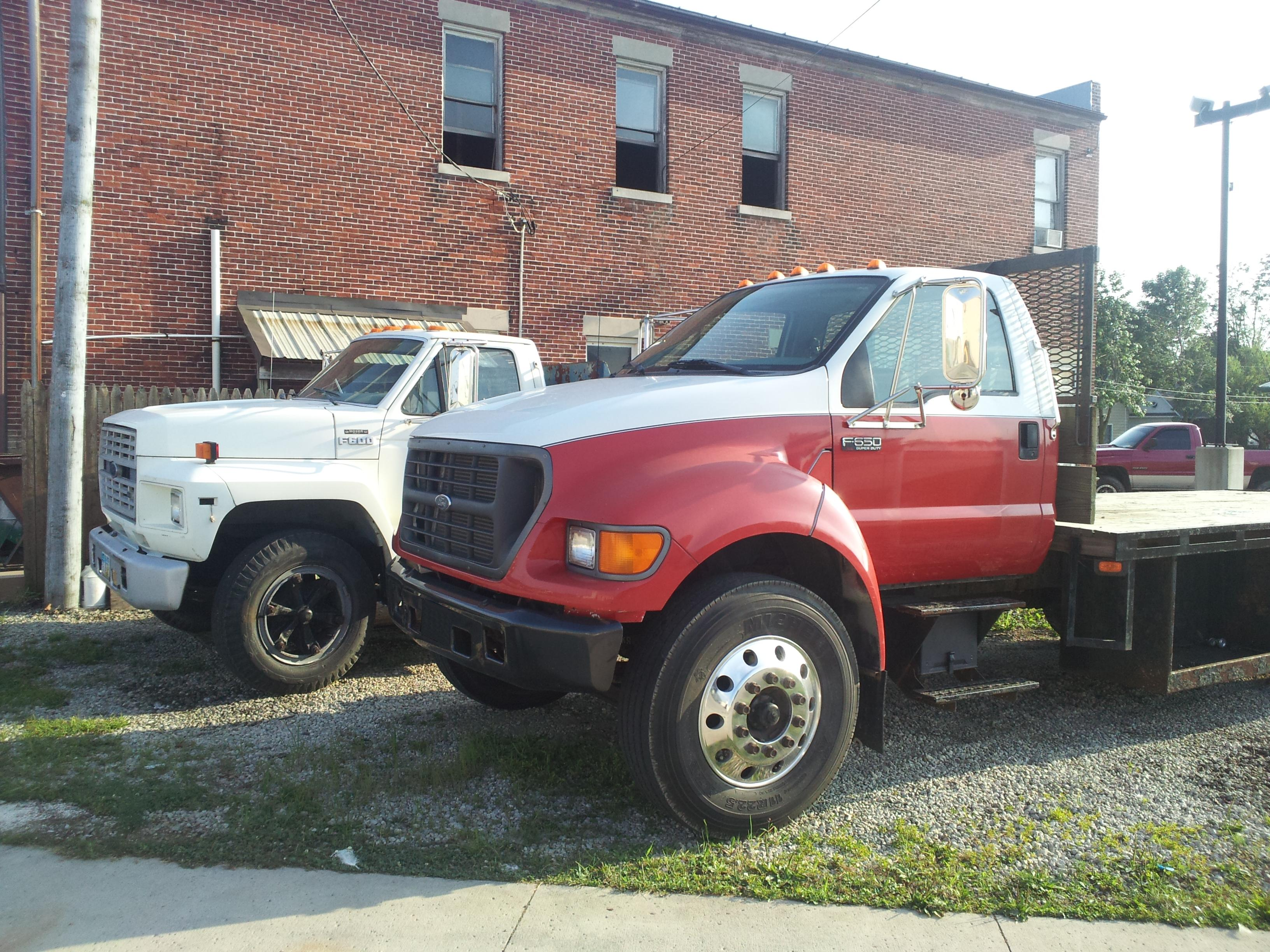
Class 6 2002 Ford F-650 in front (GVWR: 26000 lb), 1989 Ford F-600 in back (GVWR: 20,200 pounds (9.2 t)

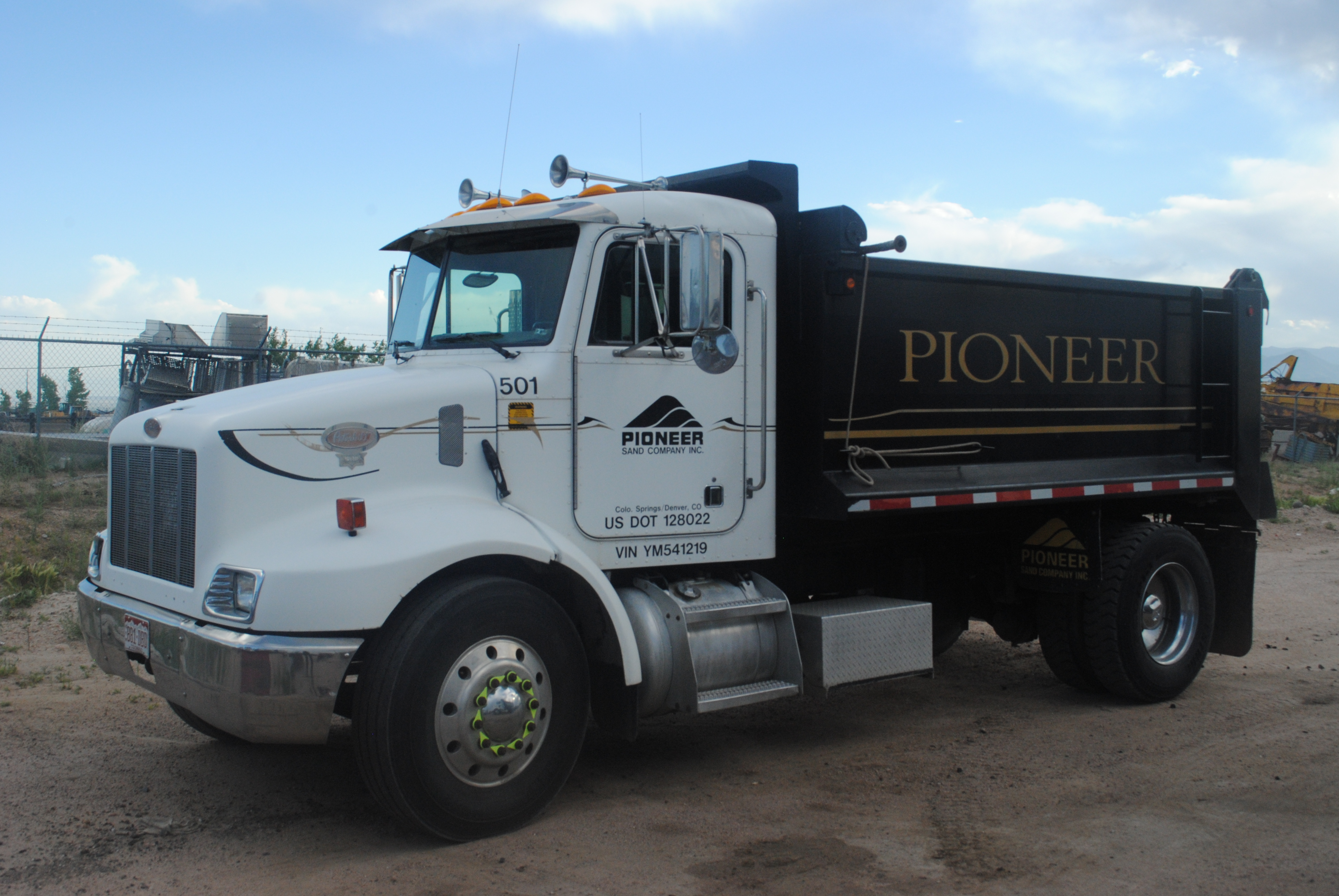
Class 7 Peterbilt 330 dump truck.

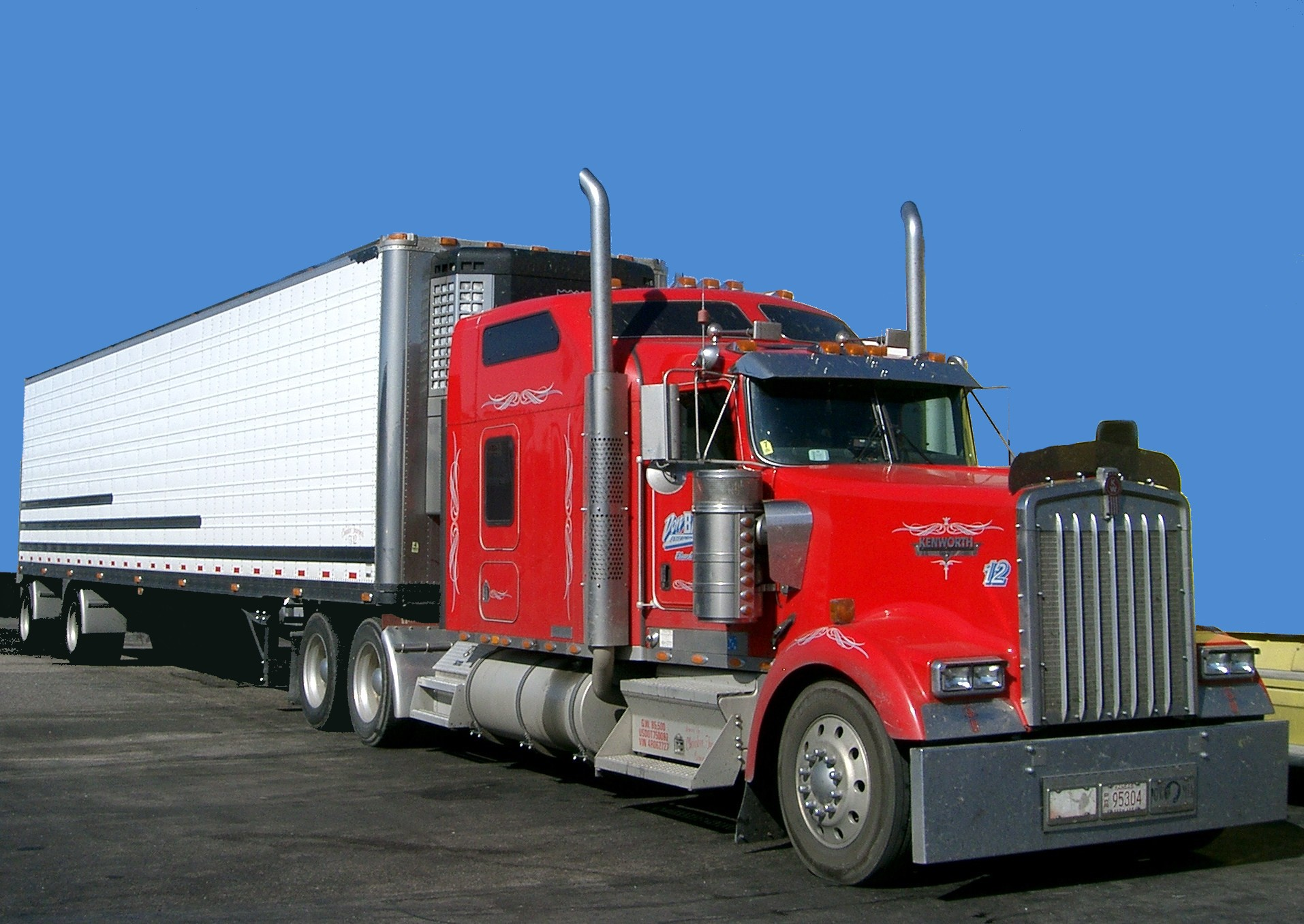
Class 8 Kenworth W900 tractor with spread-axle 48-foot (14.63 m) refrigerated trailer.

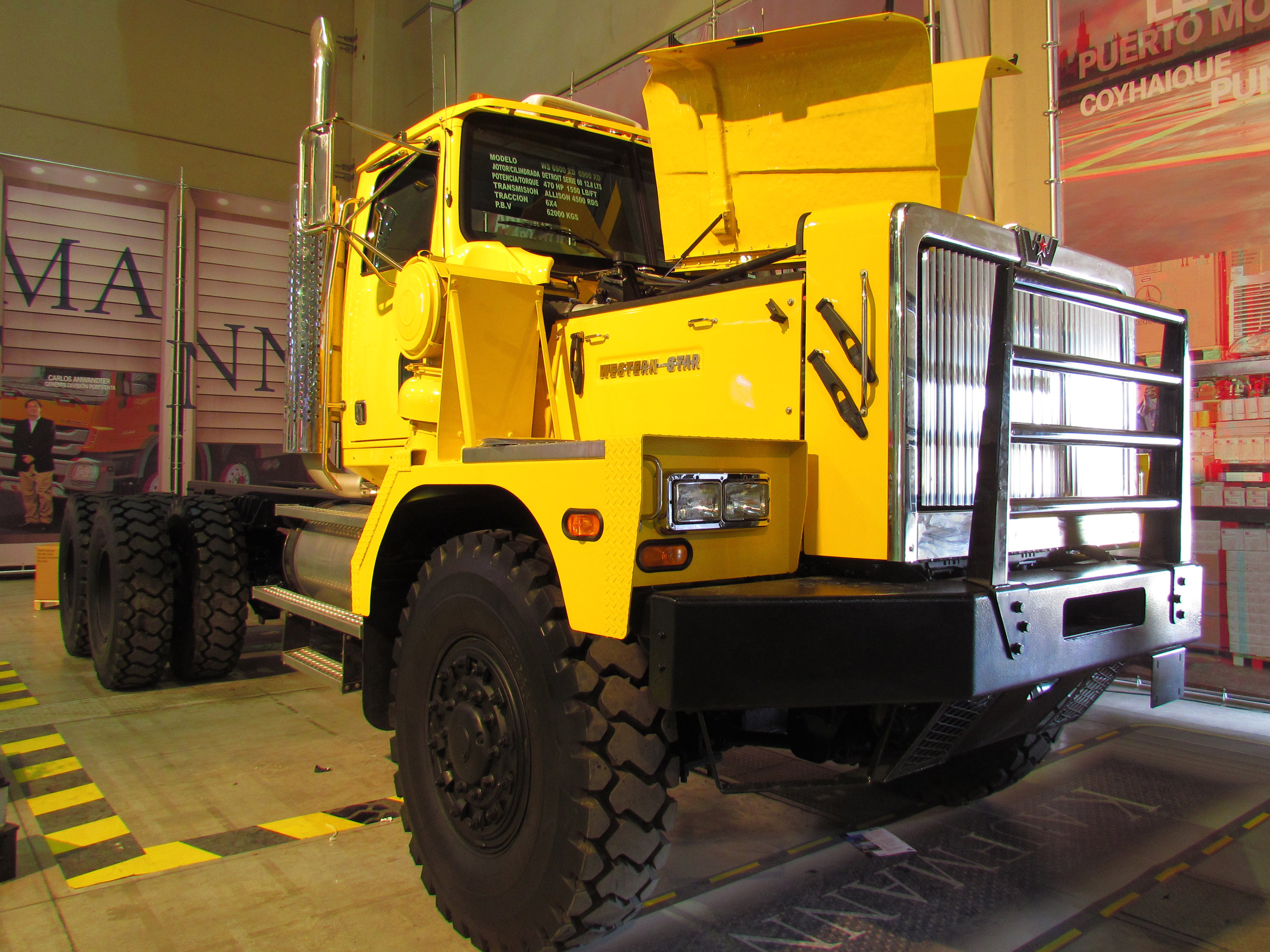
Western Star 6900XD tractor.

== See also ==
- Car classification
- Vehicle size class
- Corporate Average Fuel Economy (CAFE)
- Commercial vehicle
- Curb weight
- Driver's license
- Fifth wheel
- Gross weight:
  - Gross axle weight rating (GAWR)
  - Gross combined weight rating (GCWR)
  - Gross trailer weight rating (GTWR)
  - Gross vehicle weight rating (GVWR)
- Light commercial vehicle
- Large goods vehicle
- List of truck types
- Semi-trailer
- Tow hitch
- Trailer
- Vehicle category
