= Kässbohrer =

Kässbohrer or Käßbohrer may refer to:

== Persons ==
- Karl Heinrich Kässbohrer (1864–1922), German entrepreneur and vehicle constructor, founder of Karl Kässbohrer Fahrzeugwerke
- Karl Kässbohrer (1901–1973), German entrepreneur and vehicle constructor
- Otto Kässbohrer (1904–1989), German entrepreneur and vehicle constructor
- Philipp Käßbohrer (born 1983), German director of short films, music videos and commercials

== Businesses and organizations ==
- Karl Kässbohrer Fahrzeugwerke, former German automobile manufacturer
  - Kässbohrer Setra, former trade name for Setra buses
- Kässbohrer Fahrzeugwerke, German manufacturer of trailers for commercial vehicles, part of the Tirsan group
- Kässbohrer Geländefahrzeug, German manufacturer of snow and beach groomers
- Kässbohrer Transport Technik, Austrian manufacturer of car carriers and refrigerated vehicles and trailers
