= Kelly Brunt =

American geologist

- Education: Syracuse University University of Montana University of Chicago
- Known for: Glacial data recovery for ICESat-2 satellite
- Scientific career
- Fields: Glaciology
- Workplaces: NASA Goddard Space Flight Center Earth System Science Interdisciplinary Center, University of Maryland

Kelly Brunt is an American glaciologist researching Antarctic ice sheets. She is recognized for her work with the ICESat-2 satellite launched by NASA. Holding three degrees in Geology, she focuses on the rapidly changing ice sheets and flows in Antarctica. She has over 25 years of experience as a glaciologist and has traveled to Antarctica for field work over 15 times since the start of her career.

== Early life and education ==
Raised in Connecticut, she recalls memories of skiing with family as a child, and how she fell in love with snow. After completing her early education, Brunt left Connecticut in 1989 to pursue a bachelor's degree from Syracuse University in Geology. She graduated in 1993, then received master's degree from the University of Montana in Geology as well, graduating in 1997. She went back to school year later, and in 2008 she graduated with a PhD in geophysics, with concentration in glaciology from the University of Chicago. Her post doctoral fellowship work at Scripps Institution of Oceanography furthered her glacial research, as she studied Antarctic ice edges gathered by the original ICESat satellite. She also coaches kids in alpine skiing programs in her free time.

== Career and impact ==
After her schooling, Brunt lived in Anchorage, Alaska for 3 years then on and off in Antarctica for 4 years. She spent her time building Geographic information systems, constructing maps and data markers for researchers in remote places of study. This work set her up for her future career in ice flow research.

Brunt is a research associate at the University of Maryland within the Earth System Science Interdisciplinary Center (ESSIC).

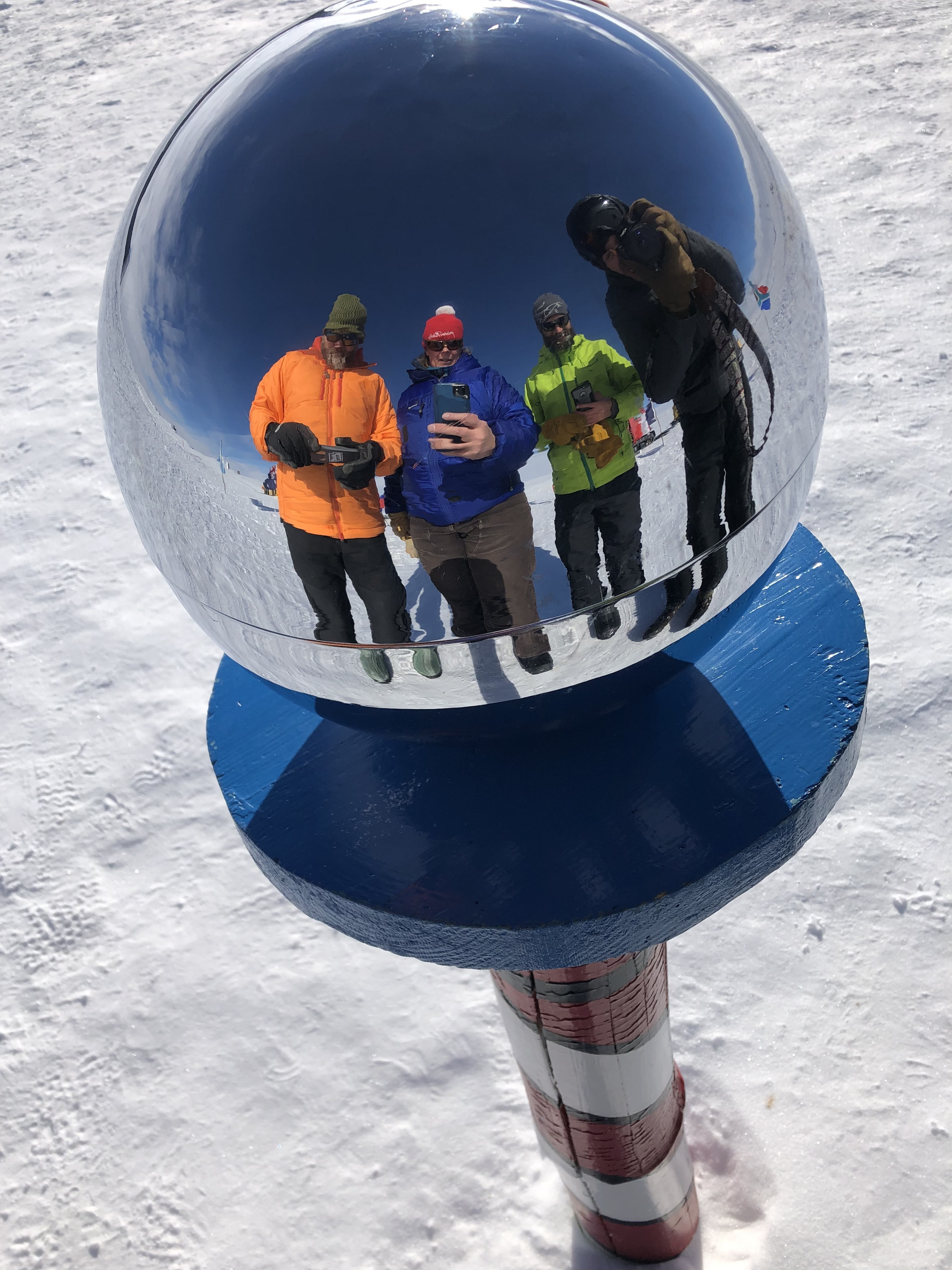
Image taken by Kelly Brunt (in blue) while on an Antarctic mission in 2018

Brunt has done work at NASA's Goddard Space Flight Center, working directly with the Ice, Cloud and land Elevation Satellite-2 (ICESat-2) Project. This project is a continuation of NASA's original ICESat, with improved technology and research. The satellite launch was planned for 2017 but wasn't successfully launched until the third quarter of 2018. The satellite will be active and in an extended mission until September 2026. Brunt's role on the team is validating data collected by the satellite. She works comparing satellite data to on-the-ground or ground based data, collected by researchers like herself. She focuses primarily on ice flows in the Ross Ice Shelf, and is quoted mentioning how flows are the only part of any formation to be a part of oceanic, atmospheric, and terrestrial systems, giving us insight in all three.

In summer 2017, Brunt traveled to the U.S Air Force base in Thule, Greenland to run the Slope Imaging Multi-polarization Photon-counting Lidar (SIMPL). SIMPL is a device that measures both sea and land ice levels in the Arctic.

During 2017's Antarctic summer, the beginning of December through end of January 2018, Brunt spent time in Antarctica doing 450 miles of data mapping and validation to support the ICESat-2 satellite launch. Driving PistenBullys, large, tractor-like vehicles, they traveled through Antarctic ice and snow collecting data while pulling their entire camp completely assembled behind them. This traverse became the first of its kind in duration and length while assuming this pre-built arrangement.

In 2021, Brunt joined the Office of Polar Programs with The National Science Foundation as a Program Director (IPA) on temporary assignment where she remained for three years. She operated within the Arctic System Sciences program and the Antarctic Glaciology Program.

In 2024, her position became permanent at The National Science Foundation. However, six months later in 2025, Brunt was relieved from her post due to the federal government's downsizing under the Trump administration, which cut many facets of scientific research, particularly polar research. Brunt continues to work at Goddard Space Flight Center.

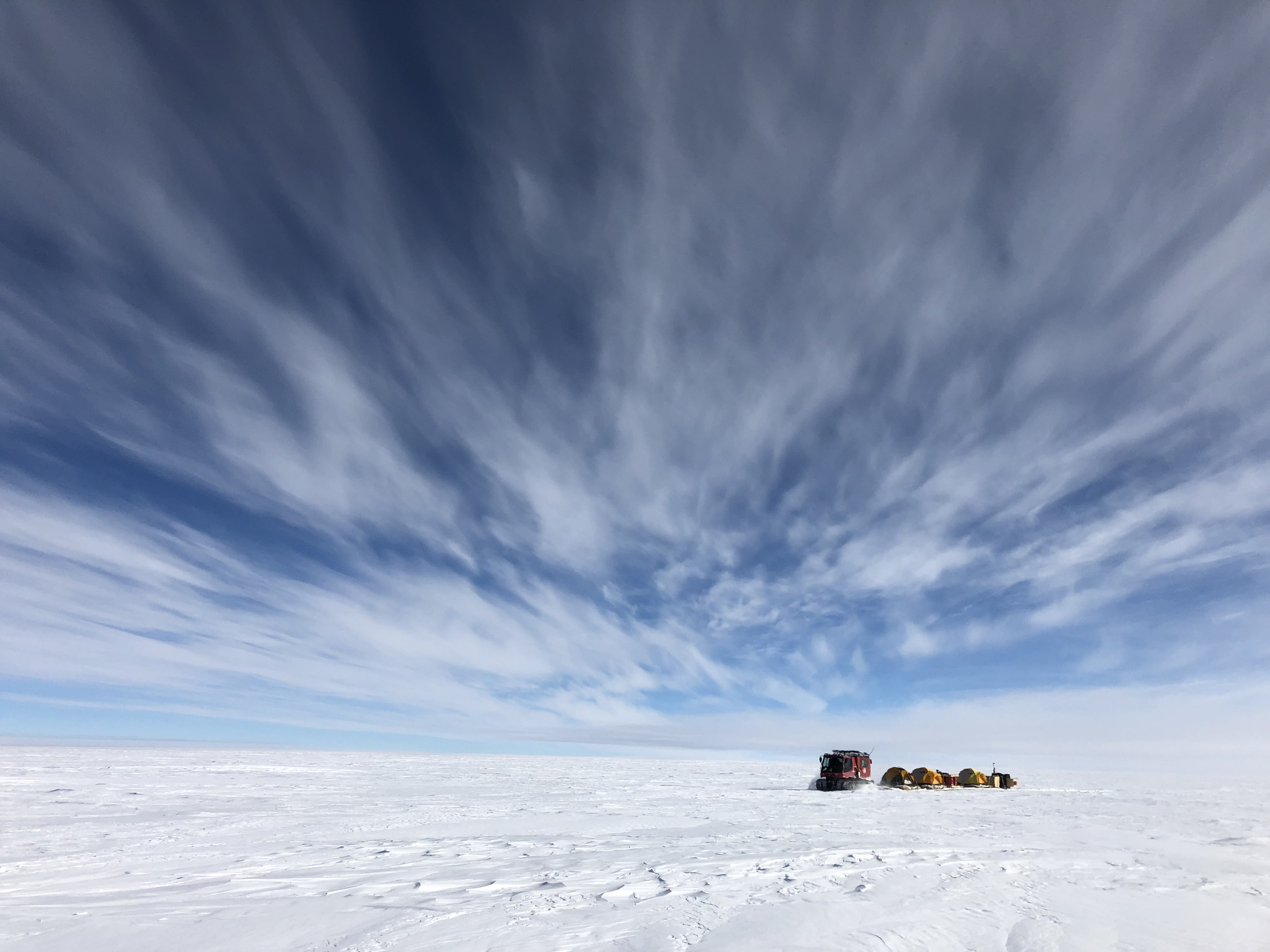
Image of a PistonBully pulling Kelly Brunt's camp behind it.

== Selected works ==
- Markus, T., Neumann, T., Martino, A., Abdalati, W., Brunt, K., Csatho, B., Farrell, S., Fricker, H., Gardner, A., Harding, D., Jasinski, M., Kwok, R., Magruder, L., Lubin, D., Luthcke, S., Morison, J., Nelson, R., Neuenschwander, A., Palm, S., & Popescu, S. (2017). The Ice, Cloud, and land Elevation Satellite-2 (ICESat-2): Science requirements, concept, and implementation. Remote Sensing of Environment, 190, 260–273. https://doi.org/10.1016/j.rse.2016.12.029
- Smith, B., Fricker, H. A., Gardner, A. S., Medley, B., Nilsson, J., Paolo, F. S., Holschuh, N., Adusumilli, S., Brunt, K., Csatho, B., Harbeck, K., Markus, T., Neumann, T., Siegfried, M. R., & Zwally, H. J. (2020). Pervasive ice sheet mass loss reflects competing ocean and atmosphere processes. Science, 368 (6496), 1239–1242. https://doi.org/10.1126/science.aaz5845
- Neumann, T., Martino, A. J., Markus, T., Bae, S., Bock, M., Brenner, A. C., Brunt, K. M., Cavanaugh, J. M., Fernandes, S. T., Hancock, D. J., Harbeck, K., Lee, J. E., Kurtz, N., Luers, P. J., Luthcke, S. B., Magruder, L. A., Pennington, T. A., Ramos-Izquierdo, L., Rebold, T. W., & Skoog, J. (2019). The Ice, Cloud, and Land Elevation Satellite – 2 mission: A global geolocated photon product derived from the Advanced Topographic Laser Altimeter System. Remote Sensing of Environment, 233, 111325–111325. https://doi.org/10.1016/j.rse.2019.111325
- Bindschadler, R., Choi, H., Wichlacz, A., Bingham, R., Bohlander, J., Brunt, K. M., Hugh, Drews, R., Fricker, H. A., Hall, M., Richard, Kohler, J., Padman, L., Rack, W., Gerit Rotschky, Stefano Urbini, Vornberger, P., & Young, N. S. (2011). Getting around Antarctica: new high-resolution mappings of the grounded and freely-floating boundaries of the Antarctic ice sheet created for the International Polar Year. 5(3), 569–588. https://doi.org/10.5194/tc-5-569-2011
