= Kögel Trailer =

Manufacturer of commercial vehicles

Kögel Trailer GmbH & Co. KG
- Type: GmbH & Co. KG
- Industry: Vehicle manufacture
- Founded: 1934
- Headquarters: Burtenbach, Germany
- Key people: Thomas , Jürgen Steinbacher, Thomas Eschey
- Revenue: 440 million EUR (2008)
- Number of employees: approx. 400 (2010)
- Website: www.koegel.com

Kögel Trailer GmbH & Co.KG is one of the largest manufacturers of commercial vehicles, amongst other things for trailers and semi-trailers. It had its headquarters in Gersthofen and was founded in 1934 by Franz Xaver Kögel.

== History ==
=== 1934-1940: beginnings ===
On 1 May 1934 Franz Xaver Kögel took over the wagon making business of his apprenticeship employer in Neu-Ulm. Franz Xaver Kögel learned his trade in this small business and had just taken his masters examination. Motorized transport of goods had just taken off with the autobahns in 1934, thus F. X. Kögel, with his wagon making business located within easy reach of the forge for chassis and trailer manufacture owned by August Welte was able to begin a forward-looking collaboration. Kögel provided the floors for the chassis and the side walls, and both companies needed to expand their businesses.

=== 1950-1960: development ===
The fusion of both tradesmen's businesses in 1956 in Donautal made Kögel one of the first businesses to settle in the new industrial area. The transition from a tradesmen's business to an industrial concern was completed when production started in the new generously dimensioned manufacturing workshops in the Donautal industrial area. Industrial production of trailers and bodies had begun and continuous growth was achieved. However, special projects were also handled in addition to this manufacture, e.g. a 9-seater cab for the 70 kW Kaelbletractor.

=== 1961-1991: acquisitions ===
In 1968 Kögel purchased additional production facilities in Karlsdorf near Bruchsal (Kamag) and in 1973 they purchased the Faka-Kannenberg vehicle manufacturer in Bückeburg near Hanover . After the fall of communism they added the Werdau factory in Saxony and, in 1993, Kögel also took over the defunct "trailer manufacture" of the Karl Kässbohrer Fahrzeugwerke in Burtenbach. A part-share in the commercial vehicle manufacturer Orlican in 1991 in the Czech Republic was converted by Kögel into a take-over at a later date, and they were made into a sub-supplier until the foundation of Kögel a.s. in 1996 in the Czech Republic. Kamag, a subsidiary of Kögel (also in Ulm since 1969) is concerned with the manufacture of heavy-duty self-driven combinations having payloads up to 10,000 t, and their customers also include NASA. In addition, two joint ventures were founded in the People's Republic of China.

=== 1991-2009: Kögel Fahrzeugwerke AG i Kögel Fahrzeugwerke GmbH ===
As the first and only company in the trailer and body industry, Kögel founded a limited company in 1991. In 2000 €25 million of investment was made in the factory in Burtenbach. The factory in Burtenbach became, with considerable investment, the most modern trailer factory in Europe. The Kögel Fahrzeugwerke AG in Ulm applied for the opening of insolvency proceedings in January 2004. This affected 1,186 employees.

In 2004 this resulted in the take-over by Trailer Holding GmbH, in Munich, with the founding of "Kögel Fahrzeugwerke GmbH“, and the new company headquarters was in Burtenbach. Kögel is one of the largest commercial vehicle manufacturers in Europe and its basic product, the semi-trailer, offers the largest selection and flexibility in the commercial vehicle market.

In 2006 the company produced around 12,000 vehicles, of which more than two thirds were supplied to other European countries. The around 1,000 employees at home and abroad were able to achieve a turnover of more than €275 million.

In 2006 Kögel introduced the brands "Kögel MAXX", "Kögel foxx" and "Kögel Phoenixx". The "Kögel" brand took over the function of an umbrella brand. While the "Kögel MAXX" brand covers the previous product range and is marketed as the main brand with qualified sales and individual consultation, the "Kögel foxx" brand became the first commercial vehicle brand to be marketed exclusively via the internet.

The "Kögel Phoenixx" brand is used for the introduction of innovative products, such as the first flatbed semi-trailer made from glass-fibre reinforced plastic (GRP).

The "Kögel Big-MAXX" - which, since 2010 has been called the Kögel Euro Trailer - was introduced by Kögel in 2005 as their contribution to dealing with future transport volumes. The Kögel Euro Trailer is a semi-trailer which has been extended in length by 1.3 metres and consequently can carry an additional 3 Euro pallets. Since the end of 2005, 300 of these vehicles have been in use with special permits throughout Germany in special forwarding companies. An assessment by Prof. Henning Wallentowitzdes from the ika in Aachen attested to the extended trailer's excellent suitability for use in practice. For the final approval of this trailer, a change to the length of trucks in Europe will be required.

An unexpected collapse in turnover caused Kögel to reduce its production capacity and 120 contract workers and 81 employees on a limited contract were made redundant in July 2008. After the redundancies, Kögel still employs around 1,360 people domestically and abroad.

=== Since 2009: Kögel Trailer GmbH & Co. KG ===
Even though Kögel was chosen as the Turnarounder of the year and the best trailer brand in 2008, the company experienced, in the same way as the entire trailer sector, a collapse in demand of up to 90% following the financial crisis in September 2008. After producing around 24,000 trailers annually up to the middle of 2008, Kögel estimated a demand of just around 2,000 trailers in 2009. On 3 August 2009, Kögel Fahrzeugwerke GmbH in Burtenbach was forced to apply for insolvency. The insolvency proceedings were opened on the 30 October 2009.

At the end of 2009, Kögel was taken over by its competitor Humbaur in Gersthofen, which operates a two-market strategy and thus can ensure the independence of the Kögel brand, which is managed as the re-founded Kögel Trailer GmbH & Co.KG.

After intensive negotiations the entrepreneur Ulrich Humbaur, whose roots are in the Augsburg region, as the new owner of Kögel agreed with the previous owners that the properties should be sold in their entirety to Humbaur. This ensures that Burtenbach will remain as the production facility for Kögel in the long-term[1]. This means that the two production facilities in Burtenbach and Choceň (CZ) are in the sole possession of Ulrich Humbaur.

=== Re-invention ===
At the IAA in September 2010, Kögel presented their new vehicles for the forwarding and construction industries on the largest stand of all the trailer manufacturers. They exhibited the "Container chassis Port 40 multiplex" – a sliding chassis vehicle. They also showed the Euro Trailer Cool, which offers forwarding companies in the refrigerated transport sector the advantage of a refrigerated body extended by 1.3 m. Kögel offers the optimum trailer for every application with its 2nd generation of the Cargo platform trailer. In addition, they showed a trailer variant as a volume trailer, the "Kögel Mega Centre Axle Trailer“, which is new at Kögel. From the refrigerated vehicle range they presented the revised and extended "Kögel Cool Rail" for rail transport. In the construction sector, where the brand was once present, Kögel now offers the flatbed trailer as a turntable trailer or semi variant. A total of 1,000 orders prove that the products from the traditional brand from southern Germany continue to be in demand.[2]

The new start is visible at Kögel. The graphic image of the brand has been revised and developed. There have also been innovations on the home page and in the brand slogan. Since the end of September 2010 there has been a completely revised Kögel website (www.koegel.com).

== Sources ==
- Magazine: Lastwagen + Omnibus ..100 Jahre LKW, Page 127
- Auto-Reporter.Net dated 28 January 2004
