= Eagle bus =

American motor coach

Eagle
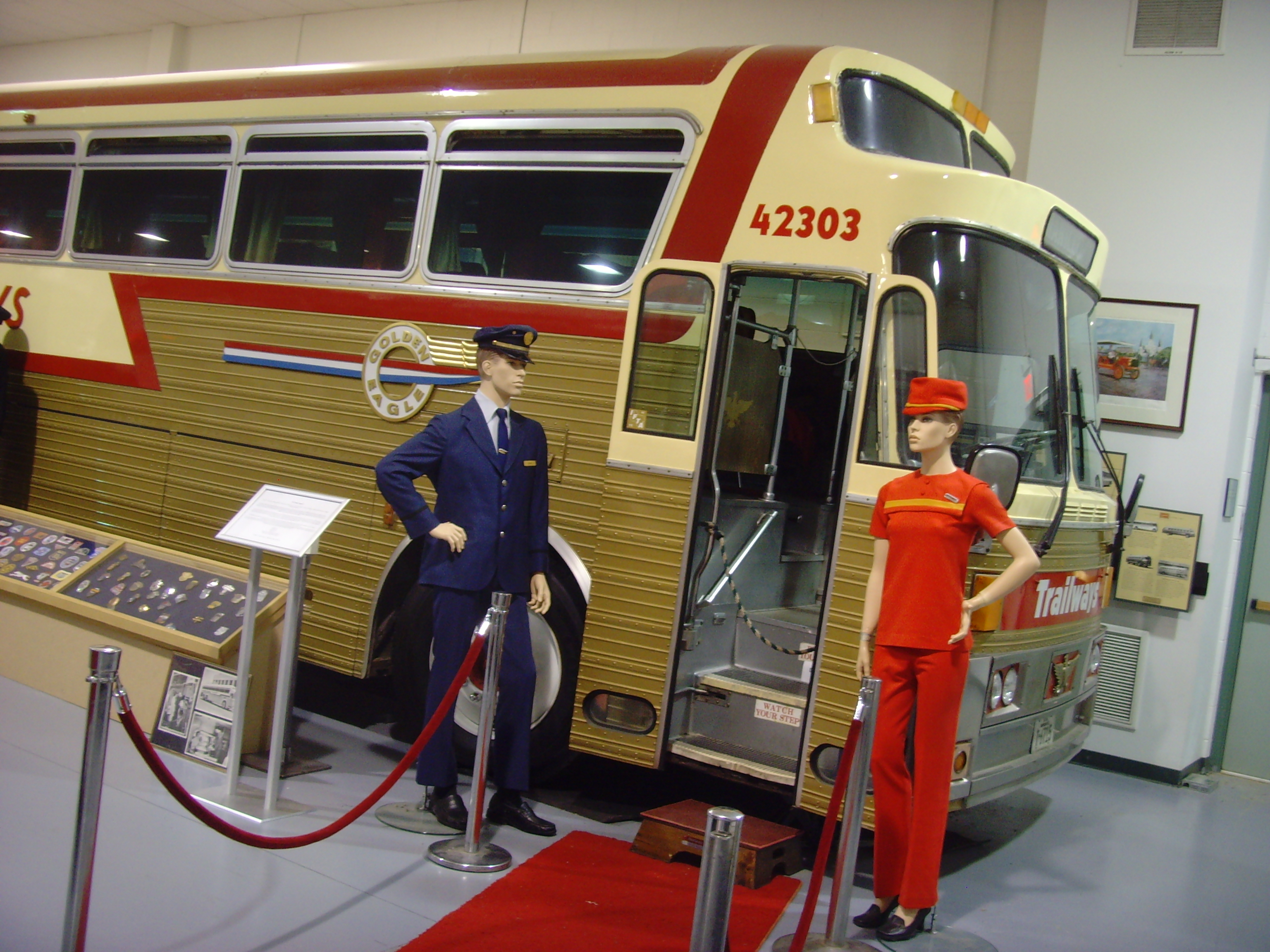
- 1971 Bus & Car Continental Trailways Golden Eagle 42303 (Frame Number 8410) on display at the Museum of Bus Transportation in Hershey, PA.

Overview
- Manufacturer: Kässbohrer; La Brugeoise; Bus & Car; Eagle International Inc; Eagle Bus Manufacturing; Silver Eagle Bus Manufacturing
- Production: 1955–1996

Body and chassis
- Doors: 1
- Floor type: Step entrance

Powertrain
- Engine: MAN D1566; Cummins NRTO; Detroit Diesel 8V-71; Detroit Diesel 8V-92; Detroit Diesel 6V-92; Detroit Diesel Series 60; Ford Gas Turbine
- Capacity: Around 46 seats + lavatory (40 ft coach); Around 55 seats + lavatory (45 ft coach)
- Power output: Diesel: 250–400 SAE HP; Gas Turbine: 450 or 600 SAE HP
- Transmission: ZF; Spicer 4 speed manual Allison

Dimensions
- Length: 35, 37, 40 and 45 ft
- Width: 96, 98.5 and 102 in
- Height: 11 feet
- Curb weight: Around 28,000 lb (13,000 kg) for a 40 ft, 96 in coach

Eagle was a make of motor coach bus. During a period of over four decades, some 8,000 Eagle coaches were built in four countries on two continents. The coaches were a common sight on American highways and were strongly associated with Continental Trailways for over three decades.

== History ==
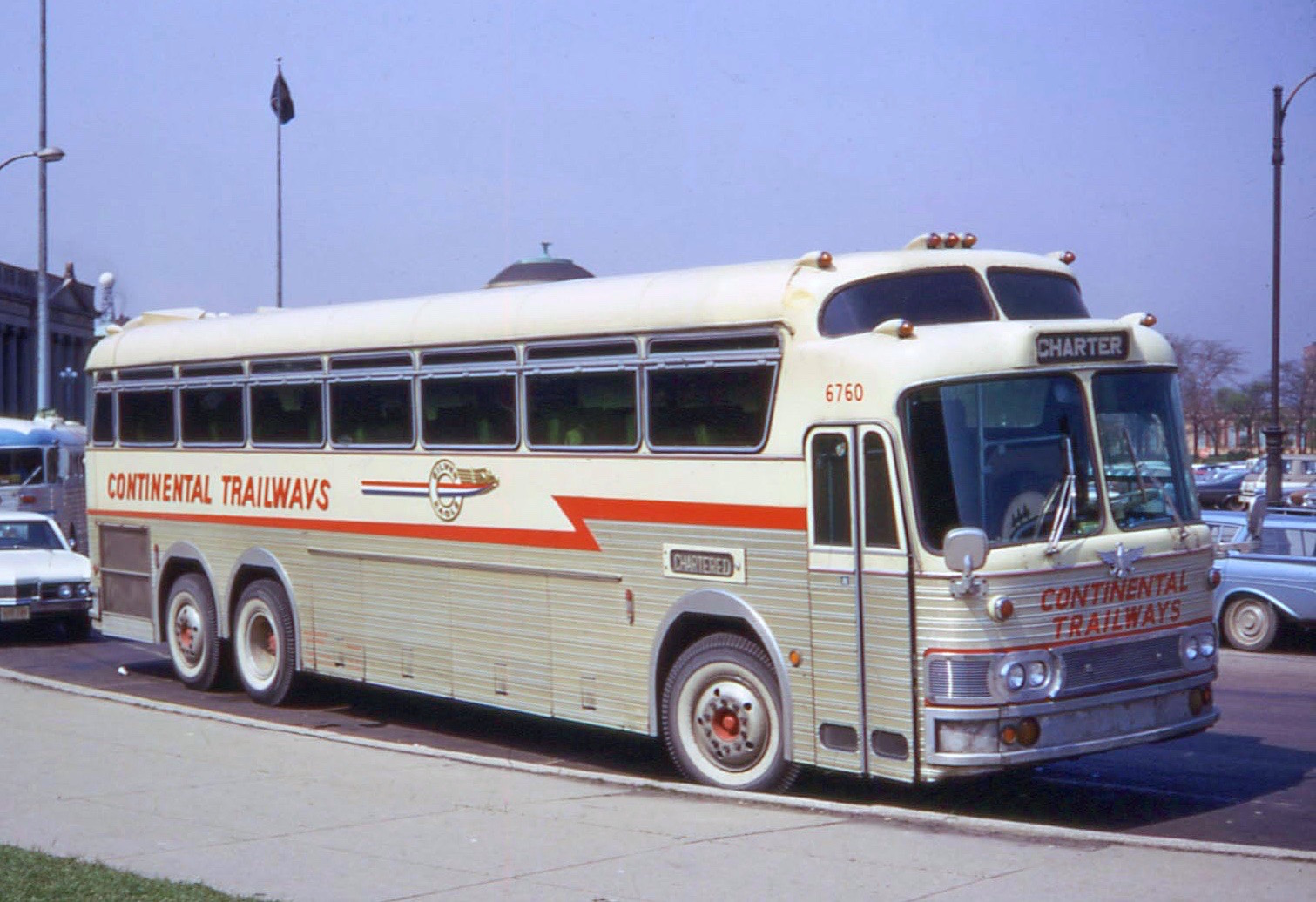
A 1962 Eagle Model 01 coach of Continental Trailways in 1968

In 1954, Greyhound introduced the 40-foot-long, two-level General Motors PD 4501 Scenicruiser. This sent its main rival, Continental Trailways, on a hunt for a unique design of its own. It first contacted Flxible of Loudonville, Ohio. Flxible agreed to produce Continental's dream coach on condition that Continental paid all design and tooling costs up front. As Continental had bought the Santa Fe Trail Transportation Company (the large bus operations of the Santa Fe Railway) in 1948 and transcontinental carrier American Buslines in 1953, they were not flush with cash at the time and started looking elsewhere. Mack, Beck and Fitzjohn either couldn't or wouldn't build this new bus (Beck and Fitzjohn were out of business by 1958 and Mack left the bus and coach business in 1960) unless the upfront costs were paid in advance.

=== 1955–1958: Kassbohrer Eagles (West Germany) ===
That sent Maurice E. Moore, Continental's CEO, to Europe looking for a supplier. Eventually he made an agreement with the German manufacturer Kässbohrer for the production of a prototype, which was completed in 1956 and shipped to Houston. In the meantime Moore ordered 113 Vista-Liner 100 coaches from Flxible for delivery in 1955 and 1956. The Vista-Liner (commonly called the VL100) was an advanced two level design but it was only 35 feet long with eight fewer seats than the Scenicruiser. The difference in height between decks was about of half that of the Scenicruiser so it had much less space underneath for baggage and package express shipments. The VL100 had some design input from Continental. It was also noticeably underpowered (it had a 175 HP Cummins JT-600 diesel engine) which caused certain timetables to be adjusted on longer journeys. On the other hand, the VL100 had BF Goodrich Torsilastic suspension (independent on the front wheels) for an excellent ride and a very fresh exterior design. The suspension and certain visual design aspects of the VL100 were integrated into the design of the future Eagle coaches that Kässbohrer built as Setras.

The first 55 Golden Eagles were built by Kässbohrer. The first Golden Eagle was a prototype that differed in a number of ways from the production versions. After about a year in service Continental placed an order for 50 more modified versions based on lessons learned from the prototype. The largest external difference was a new design for the six-piece windshield because drivers complained that the original design had them baking in the Texas sun even with air conditioning. They were part of an order for 185 highway coaches manufactured under a contract with Continental Trailways. Of this original group, four were articulated Super Golden Eagles. All of these coaches were of the 'Setra Design' which meant that they were 'integral' coaches without a separate body and chassis. Kässbohrer took the German words selbst tragend (self-carrying) for a trademark in the form of Setra, a name formed from the first letters of those two words.

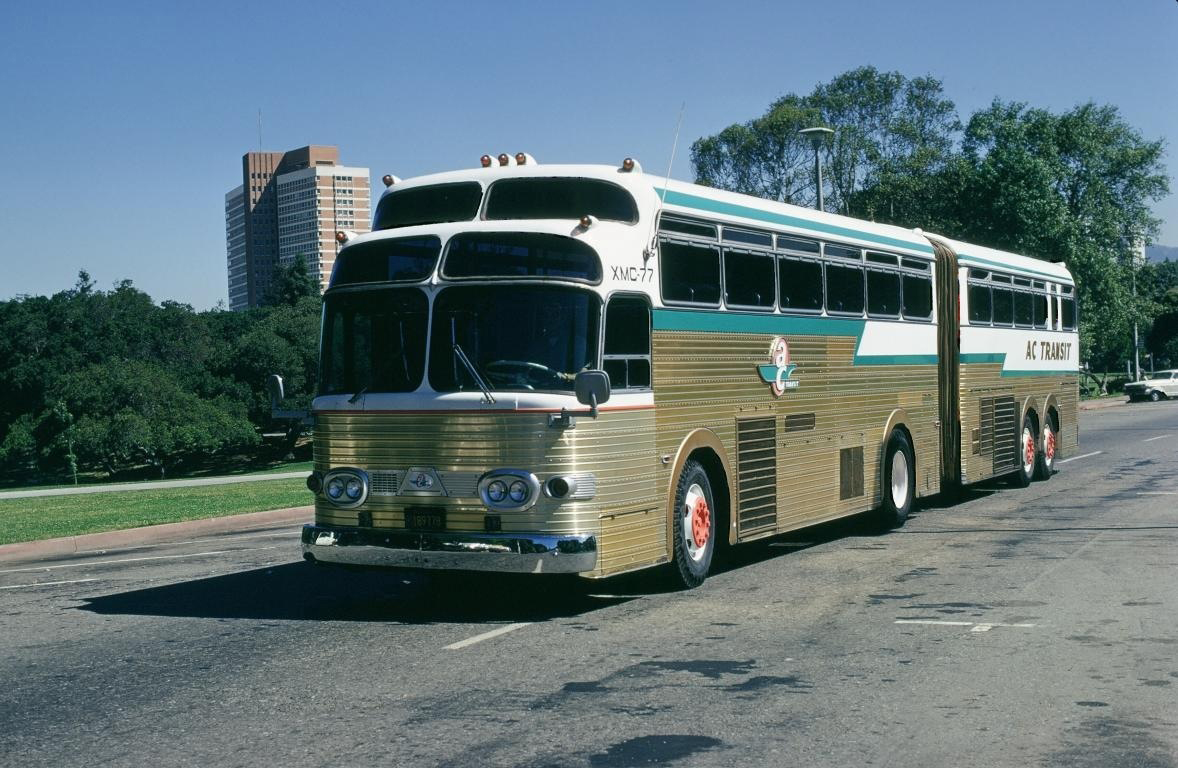
1958 Kässbohrer-Setra Super Golden Eagle, an articulated design

Golden Eagles originally contained an aircraft-style galley plus a rear lounge that had two tables with pairs of facing seats, observation windows and other luxury features such as piped in music, newspapers and magazines. An on-board hostess served snacks and drinks en route and other amenities such as pillows and blankets were available. The exterior aluminum siding was anodized in gold, hence the Golden Eagle name. The standard version without the galley and lounge was called the Silver Eagle because the aluminum siding was a metallic grey color. 41 Silver Eagles followed their Golden Eagle sisters down Kässbohrer's production line in 1958 and became the standard fleet bus for Continental Trailways. The first Eagle buses were powered by MAN D1566 diesel engines and ZF Media preselector six speed transmissions from Germany. The four Super Golden Eagles had more powerful Rolls-Royce diesel engines.

=== 1960–1974 Bus & Car Eagles (Belgium) ===
No Eagles were produced in 1959 while Continental gained experience with its new fleet. Continental suggested a number of design changes to Kässbohrer that included a new front end and a standard American powertrain. The result was the new Silver Eagle model that was to be produced in 1960 and 1961. Most new Silver Eagles had Cummins 300 HP NRTO engines but the last ones made arrived in the US without engines as General Motors released the Detroit Diesel 8V-71 engine and these were installed when the buses arrived.

All older Eagles, except the four Super Golden Eagles, received 8V-71 engines and Spicer four-speed manual transmissions to replace their original power packages. Continental also bought two other Setra articulated buses in 1957 for service from Denver to the Air Force Academy at Colorado Springs. They were not high level buses and lacked underfloor luggage space. They were standard Setra buses with separate Setra bodies and Henschel chassis for their European customers rather than something designed for the US market. They had nothing in common with the Eagle coaches that Setra built for Continental and were powered with Cummins underfloor engines.

Around the same time in 1959 that Continental and Kässbohrer were agreeing on the details of the second generation of the Eagle (the new Silver Eagle, mentioned above), Kässbohrer decided to concentrate exclusively on building coaches for the rapidly growing European market. At this point, Continental Trailways was forced to find a European partner. They found one in the form of the Belgian transportation equipment manufacturer La Brugeoise et Nivelles (Bruges and Nivelles, the two cities where they had factories). La Brugeoise, as they were commonly known, helped Continental to form its own bus manufacturing company, Bus & Car Co, Nevada. La Brugeoise et Nivelles (later known as BN and today part of Bombardier Transportation) worked with Bus & Car to set up a new factory in Sint Michels bij Brugge. La Brugeoise had a long history of building railway and tramway equipment including PCC streetcars built under license from the Transit Research Corporation in the US.

Kässbohrer sold the tooling and spare parts to Continental Trailways and agreed to furnish most of the parts needed for the 85 new Silver Eagles previously contracted for. La Brugeoise started producing the new Silver Eagles (the ones that Kässbohrer would have built) in its Brugge plant late in 1960 with certain parts and materials that Kässbohrer had already built, including steering wheels with the Kässbohrer emblem on the horn button. In the meantime, La Brugeoise helped Bus & Car design its new plant and supervised its construction.

La Brugeoise started Eagle production with the Model 01 as soon as the last new Silver Eagle rolled off the line. Late in 1961 the Bus & Car factory opened and all Eagle tooling, parts, equipment and production was moved out of the La Brugeoise factory and into the new Bus & Car factory, which was near to the main offices of La Brugeoise. The Model 01 continued in production by Bus & Car but they continued buying the Torsilastic suspension units from La Brugeoise until the end of Eagle production in Europe.

In 1968 Continental Trailways spun off the Bus and Car Company to its stockholders. Most of its stockholders were the companies that Continental bought out by means of stock swaps during its large expansion of the 1950s and 1960s. The former Bus & Car building still stands and is presently a shopping center. Parts of it had earlier been used as a Rover car dealership, various shops and an indoor downhill ski track with artificial snow. BN went on to build 204 diesel locomotives for the Belgian and Luxembourg Railways with GM 567 engines and many more PCC cars for Brussels, Antwerp and Ghent in Belgium plus The Hague in Holland.

Bus & Car built a number of other models (listed below) in Belgium for different markets through 1980, and that included right-hand-drive models for Australia and Ireland. They were quite flexible concerning lengths and widths and other details like the number of axles. They also sold new coaches in Canada, Morocco, South Africa, Thailand and across Europe less the United Kingdom.

The Model 05 was introduced as two prototypes in 1967 and production started partway through the 1968 model year and was produced in Belgium and later in the US. The first 05s had the 05 chassis changes built into the 01 body and the 05 styling changes arrived in 1969. Bus & Car also built three 05 Silver Eagle coaches with Ford Gas turbine engines of 450 HP and 600 HP during 1969. They were used on transcontinental service until the program was terminated about a year later. High fuel consumption, only 4 MPG, and severe reliability problems caused these coaches to be repowered with the standard Detroit Diesel 8V-71 engines.

Another 1969 product of Bus & Car was the Model 07. This was an 05 that was 102 inches wide (rather than 96); 45 were produced. The 'Bus & Car' name may sound odd as they never made automobiles but the word 'Car' in this case came from the European term 'Touring Car/Touringcar' or highway coach as opposed to a local or regional bus. Continental Trailways also had a parts division in the US called Bus & Truck Supply Company. It seems the only truck parts they distributed were those that were common to Eagle coaches such as Detroit Diesel engine parts, Lockheed brakes, Carrier compressors, Spicer transmissions and Ross steering.

In the early 1970s, Trailways drivers and maintainers referred to 'Round' (01 and 05 Old Look) Eagles and 'Square' (05 New Look and 07) Eagles based on the body design. The 01 Eagles had the drive axle ahead of the tag axle. The 05 and 07 Eagles had the tag axle ahead of the drive axle, which made them 'interesting' to drive. The front suspension was very soft with a lot of travel, and since the tag axle torsion bar (mounted crosswise) was also pushing the front end up, some drivers said it was like driving a diving board when driving on certain road surfaces. The front end went up and down at every expansion joint in the road and sometimes the driver had to grip the steering wheel hard to remain seated. On the other hand, Eagles had almost no body roll in curves or corners, unlike buses with air suspension which gave the feeling they were about to tip over when turning. All older Eagles had suspension seats for their drivers, and some drivers would take the hydraulic jack from the tool kit and set it up under their seat to stop its vertical motions.

Trailways Eagles provided a more comfortable ride than Greyhound's GM and Motor Coach Industries coaches. From the 1960s to the 1980s, Trailways and Greyhound ran competitive services on the Boston-to-New York and New York-to-Washington routes with hourly departures for most of the day. This led many frequent travelers to make comparisons between the two companies and their equipment. The Eagles were warmer in the winter, had a more comfortable ride, much more comfortable seats and a quieter cabin appointed in better-quality materials than any of their competitors.

Increasing wage rates in Belgium and a decline in the value of the dollar overseas started to cause problems for Eagle and Continental; the solution was to set up a plant in the US.

=== 1974–1996: Eagle International/Eagle Bus Manufacturing (United States of America) ===
Very late in 1974, Eagle International Inc started building coaches in Brownsville, Texas, and for two years the Model 05 was built both in Belgium and Texas. From 1977, all coaches for the US market were built in Texas. MOL N.V. bought the remains of Bus & Car after it went bankrupt in 1978 and continued selling buses and parts up to at least 1987 under the 'MOL Eaglebus' name. In the US, the early buses made in Brownsville had some notable quality issues compared to their Belgian sisters, and this got worked out by 1977, but it was a bitter pill for the Trailways operating companies to swallow in the short term.

The Model 10 replaced the Model 05 with many design and technical changes in 1980. A small number of Model 05s with Model 10 styling features preceded the real Model 10 down the production line and caused confusion because they did not have any of the Model 10 improvements other than the new styling. The spotting feature that gives them away is the Model 05 dashboard and instrument panel. The Model 10 introduced the Detroit Diesel 6V-92 engine and an Allison four-speed automatic transmission to Eagle coaches.

In 1985 the Model 15 was introduced making the standard bus 102 inches wide and from 1989 coaches could be ordered in 35-, 40- and 45-foot lengths. The 96-inch-wide Model 20 arrived in 1986 to replace the 96-inch-wide Model 10. The 20 had the same styling as the Model 15.

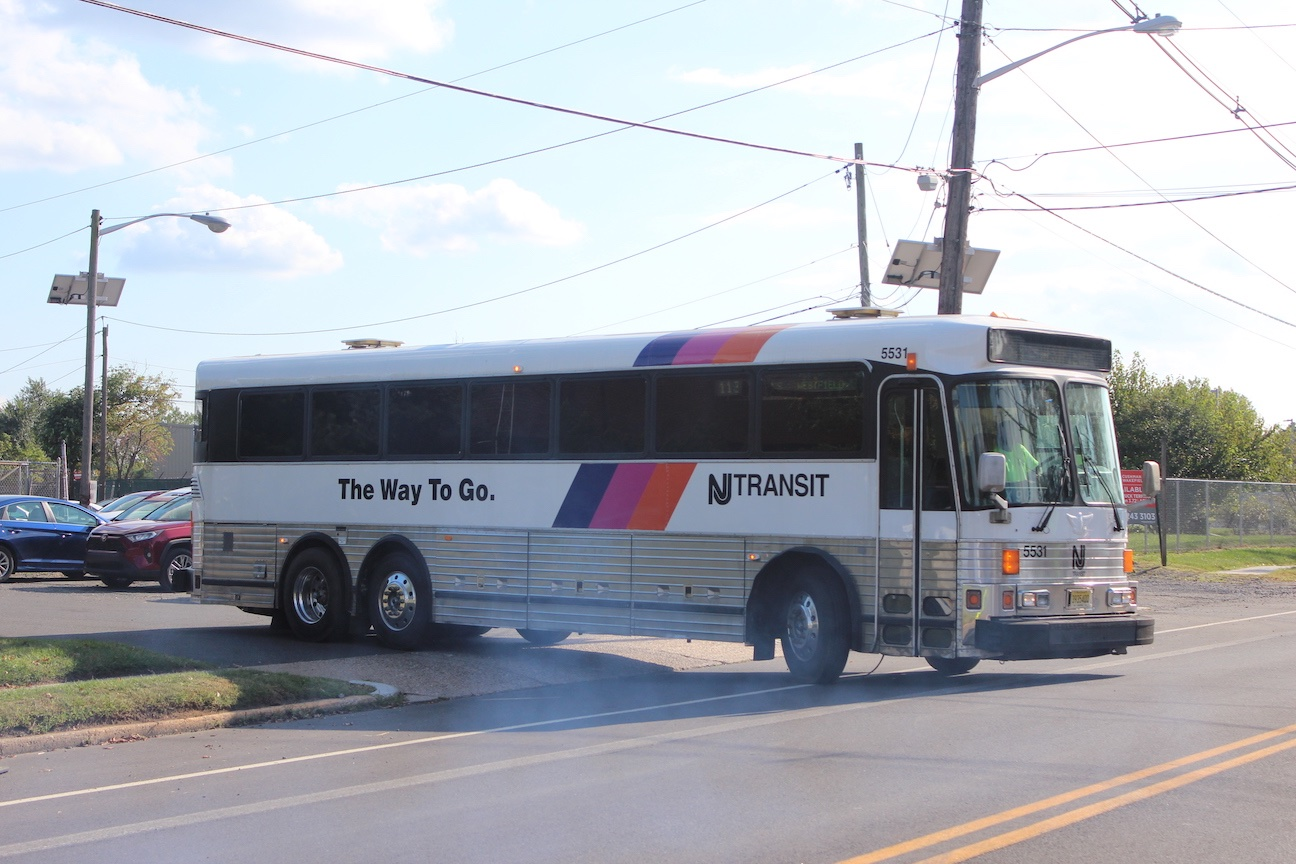
A preserved New Jersey Transit 1989 Eagle AE-20 coach.

In 1987, Greyhound purchased Trailways Inc and Eagle International Inc and the name was then changed to Eagle Bus Manufacturing Inc. In the 1990s, Greyhound declared bankruptcy, which also included all of its subsidiaries to include Eagle Bus Manufacturing Inc. Some Eagles continued to be made but they were mostly entertainer coaches for celebrities and motorhomes rather than seated coaches for charters, tours and scheduled service.

In the late 1990s, the company was split and moved to two locations in Mexico which had a high demand for seated coaches at the time, and Eagles were built only for the Mexican market. All had the trademark Eagle styling and Torsilastic suspension. In time Eagle ceased to be a major player in the Mexican market, and its activities were wound down.

=== 2000s: Silver Eagle Bus Manufacturing (United States of America) ===
In the mid-2000s, Silver Eagle Bus Manufacturing Inc (SEBM) was established in Brownsville, Texas, to revive the Eagle coach. Using tooling and parts stocks from Mexico, SEBM offered the older Models 15 and 20 in 37-, 40- and 45-foot versions.

There was also a new design, the 102-inch-wide Model 25 available in 40- and 45-foot versions. The Model 25 abandoned most Eagle styling traditions in favor of a boxy look intended to maximize interior volume for motorhome conversions. Only one Model 25, a 45-foot version, was ever made and sold. The Model 25 was never tested and certified as a passenger coach in accordance with the Federal Motor Vehicle Safety Standards in effect at the time.

SEBM also produced one 37-foot Model 20, but it has never been learned if it was actually completed and sold. The company was undercapitalized from the start and went out of business after relocating to Gallatin, Tennessee, as it was unable to pay off its many creditors.

== Models ==
Model	Year	Qty	Builder	Notes
Golden Eagle	1956–1958	51	KASS	
Academy Express	1957	2	KASS	technically not Eagles; replaced two Silver Eagles under the contract with Kässbohrer
Super Golden Eagle	1958	4	KASS	
Silver Eagle	1958	41	KASS	
New Silver Eagle	1960–1961	85	LB&N	Kässbohrer design that evolved into the later Model 01
01	1961		LB&N	
01	1961–1968		B&C	1963 models had higher roofs and were nicknamed "Hightops"
Golden Eagle 01	1963	31	B&C	had higher roofs; nicknamed "Hightops"
Golden Eagle 01	1964	13	B&C	
02	1964	1	B&C	40 ft (12 m) x 102 in (2.6 m) 2-axle prototype operated only in Texas
04	1966–1971	100+	B&C	unique model for European and North African customers
05	1968–1976		B&C	
05E	1970–1980		B&C	12 m (40 ft) x 2.5 m (98 in) European version of the Model 05
Golden Eagle 05	1969	50	B&C	
Golden Eagle 05	1971	12	B&C	
05	1974–1979		EAGLE	
07	1969–1970	45	B&C	102-inch-wide versions of Model 05
09	1972	20	B&C	for South African Railways
10 or AE10	1980–1987		EAGLE	updated version of Model 05
10LT				Model 10 with premium interior fittings
10S	1982–1983	84	NTM	2-axle commuter version of Model 10
12	1972	15	B&C	11.1 m (36 ft) 2-axle European version for World Travel (Thailand)
14	1975	40	B&C	commuter version of Model 05 for SNCV (Belgium)
15	1972		B&C	11.1 m (36 ft) 2-axle European version of Model 05, nearly identical to Model 12
M15 Transcontinental	1975–1980		B&C/MOL	updated European version of Model 05
AE 15	1985–1996		EAGLE	102 in-wide (2.6 m) version of Model AE 10
16	1975	15	B&C	commuter version of Model 15 for STIB (Brussels, Belgium)
17	1976	?	B&C/MOL	a few prototypes of an advanced city bus
M20 Touring	c. 1980	3	MOL	constructed on MOL chassis and Irizar bodies from Spain
AE 20	1987–1996		EAGLE	updated version of Model AE 10 with AE 15 styling
25	2006	1	SEBM	motorhome prototype; sold 2007
M28	1976		MOL	21-seat small transit bus with Jonckheere Bermuda bodies; first used by NIVB (Bruges, Belgium); later units purchased by Ath, Belgium
M31	1978	25	MOL	2.5 m-wide (98 in) transit and commuter bus for MIVL (Gent, Belgium); MOL chassis with Jonckheere bodies; Eagle emblems on the front and MOL emblems on the rear

=== Builders ===
	Company	City	Country
B&C	Bus & Car	Sint-Michels-bij-Brugge	Belgium
EAGLE	Eagle International	Brownsville, Texas	United States
KASS	Kässbohrer Setra	Ulm	Germany
LB&N	La Brugeoise et Nivelles	Brugge	Belgium
MOL	MOL Eaglebus	Brugge	Belgium
NTM	New Trails Manufacturing Company	Harlingen, Texas	United States
SEBM	Silver Eagle Bus Manufacturing	Brownsville, Texas	United States
