= Otto Kässbohrer =

German entrepreneur and manufacturer

Otto Kässbohrer (26 January 1904 – 20 June 1989, Ulm) was a German entrepreneur and vehicle manufacturer. In 1951 he designed and constructed one of the first chassisless buses.

== Life ==
Kässbohrer started his apprenticeship in 1919 in the Karl Kässbohrer Fahrzeugwerke vehicle factory which had been established by de:Karl Heinrich Kässbohrer, his father, in 1893. His apprenticeship was formally completed when he received his qualification certificate in 1922. That same year, on 26 December, his father died, and Kässbohrer took control of the business together with his brother, Karl, who was studying for an engineering qualification at the time.

The firm employed 20 people at this stage, and was already specializing in public transport vehicles. In 1928 Kässbohrer purchased an Ulm coach building firm called Neuner & Thieme which had run into difficulties. He decided to specialize in producing buses, trailers and vehicle bodies.

Twenty years later Otto Kässbohrer found time to marry his wife, Kathi Kemnitz. 1948 was also the year in which he was nominated chairman of the politically powerful VDA (Automotive Industry Association).

In 1951 he succeeded in building one of the first chassisless buses, under the name Setra (SElbst-TRAgend / Self-supporting). At this time monocoque bodied cars, inspired by the pre-war Opel Olympia, were beginning to appear, and applying equivalent structural approach to motor coaches was a logical extension of this development in the auto industry. Just two years later, at the 1953 Frankfurt Motor Show, Setra presented Europe’s first articulated bus, with space, it was claimed, for 170 passengers. A feature of the Setra buses that was unusual at that time was their rear-mounted engines, which made it possible to incorporate relatively low floors and doors along most of the length of the passenger cabin. But later designs also became available featuring high floors, with space below the passenger deck for luggage and, on long distance coaches, other enhancements such as drivers’ bunks and passenger toilets. Already in the 1950s Setra delivered the first three-axle, high-deck buses, the “Silver Eagle” and the “Golden Eagle” in North America

In 1973 his brother and co-director, Karl Kässbohrer, died, and Otto Kässbohrer took on the sole leadership role. Four years later he funded a window, known as the Fenster der Erfüllung (Window of fulfillment) in the local cathedral, and in 1978 Ulm recognized his contribution to the city’s success, honouring him with a medal for service to the city.

In 1982 chairmanship of the firm passed to Kässbohrer’s nephew. Two years later, in 1984, he led the creation of the Otto Kässbohrer Foundation, a charitable foundation whose objectives included providing support for employees who had, through no fault of their own, fallen on hard times. In January 1989, on his 85th birthday, he received the Albrecht Berblinger Award, and six months later, on 20 June, he died.
