= Seida =

Spanish car and truck manufacturer

Sociedad Española de Importación y Distribución de Automóviles (S.E.I.D.A. or, more commonly, Seida) was a Spanish cars and trucks dealer and coachbuilder that later evolved into making integral chassisless motorcoaches. In 1998, it was subsumed into Evobus.

== History ==
=== Chrysler dealer ===
Seida was incorporated in 1925, and began as the dealer for Spain of all the brands of Chrysler Corporation. As such, it became very well known, and in the 1930s its main showroom in Madrid, located in downtown main avenue, Gran Vía, and known as Salón Chrysler, was noted by its luxury, serving even as sporadic art gallery for some avant-garde exhibitions. By the same years, Seida opened a new rationalist repair shop and gas station building in Espronceda Street, by the renowned architect José de Azpiroz, that became a hall-mark of the modern architectural trends in Madrid.

In April 1935 Seida sponsored the show in Madrid of an American hell driver named Miller on a Plymouth car.

That same year, 1935, Seida began to assemble Chrysler's Dodge trucks in a new plant built in Zorroza, Marino Archer Street, on the docks of Bilbao. Several hundreds of them were made both before and after the Spanish Civil War.

The links with Chrysler Corporation persisted until 1969, when Chrysler Europe disembarked in Spain through the acquisition of Barreiros.

Mobile bank office for Banco de Bilbao in a bus body built by Seida in 1961 over a Pegaso 5040 chassis

External image
- "Seida bodied three-axle Vetra trolleybus"

=== Coachbuilder ===
In the 1940s, after the Spanish Civil War, Seida extended the premises in Zorroza with a new building to a Chrysler design, and switched to coachbuilding, the first bus chassis bodied being a hundred of German Klöckner units released in 1942. In those years Seida expanded its business to become shipowner, purchasing the merchant steamer Sendeja.

By the 1950s Seida led the Spanish market of coach bodies, having patented, as Metalbloc, an all-metal body structure. By then Seida became the preferred bodybuilder for Pegaso, which was at the time the most pervasive bus and coach chassis maker in Spain. Specially memorable were its bodies for the Pegaso Z-404 coach or city bus chassis, that used to receive a striking body which featured the same cross-shaped radiator grille that Touring put in its carrozzerie for the Pegaso Z-102 sports cars.

Along those years other significant Seida works were the bodies for Hispano-Suiza trolleybuses for the city of San Sebastián, Dodge two-level coaches for Iberia Airlines, double-deck Guy and single-deck Pegaso buses, for the city of Madrid, and ACLO and Pegaso inter-city line coaches for Alsa. For the city of Madrid, Seida built four three-axle Vétra VA3B2 trolleybuses with GEE (General Eléctrica Española) electrical equipment.

=== Rootes and Babcock dealer ===
For a few years along the 50s, Seida was also dealer in Spain for the British Rootes Group car brands, and too for the short-lived Spanish-made Babcock truck.

=== The Kässbohrer connection ===
In 1963 Seida reached an agreement with German Kässbohrer to license-build Setra chassisless coaches. These were equipped with Pegaso engines and other mechanical units and were marketed with simultaneous double badge as Setra Seida and Pegaso. Initially Seida built models S14 and S10 from Setra, the first one, a full-length 12-metre 55-seat vehicle, being by far the most demanded. A few years later the S154, recently launched by Setra, replaced the S14 while the S10 was discontinued.

Despite being rather expensive, these coaches were very successful in the Spanish market, to the point that Seida opened a second plant in Vigo. In the 1970s MAN, Mercedes-Benz or Cummins engines were offered as alternative power units to the Pegaso ones, and the Setra Seida and Pegaso badging was replaced by just Setra.

In 1981 Seida inaugurated a new modern plant in Sámano (Castro Urdiales), but soon ran into difficulties, including bitter disagreements with Kässbohrer, and suffered in the late 80s and early 90s a long and rather complex financial and legal process, which included several changes of the society registered name and ownership. The plant in Vigo meanwhile was sold to Talleres Varela Bus, a general auto repair shop.

=== The end ===
In 1998 the Castro Urdiales plant went to the hands of Daimler-Benz's Evobus concern and Seida successor company disappeared.

== Bibliography ==
- Herrán, Luis María & Setra S.A. (1993). Seida-SETRA, 50 años de historia de una empresa (1942–1992). Castro Urdiales: Setra S.A. No ISBN.
