= Burtenbach =

- Municipality
- Coat of arms

- Location of Burtenbach within Günzburg district
- Interactive map of Burtenbach
- Location within Germany Location within Bavaria
- Coordinates: 48°21′N 10°27′E
- Country: Germany
- State: Bavaria
- Admin. region: Schwaben
- District: Günzburg

Government
  - Mayor (2020–26): Roland Kempfle

Area
  - Total: 37.64 km^{2} (14.53 sq mi)
- Elevation: 485 m (1,591 ft)

Population (2025-12-31)
  - Total: 3,447
  - Density: 91.58/km^{2} (237.2/sq mi)
- Time zone: UTC+01:00 (CET)
  - Summer (DST): UTC+02:00 (CEST)
- Postal codes: 89349
- Dialling codes: 08285
- Vehicle registration: GZ
- Website: www.burtenbach.de

Burtenbach (German pronunciation: [ˈbʊʁtn̩bax]) is a municipality in the district of Günzburg in Bavaria in Germany.
