= Karl Kässbohrer Fahrzeugwerke =

Former German automobile and bus manufacturer

Karl Kässbohrer Fahrzeugwerke GmbH
- Company type: Private
- Industry: Automotive
- Founded: 1893; 133 years ago in Ulm, Germany
- Founder: Karl Heinrich Kässbohrer
- Defunct: 1995
- Successors: Kässbohrer Fahrzeugwerke; Kässbohrer Geländefahrzeug; Kässbohrer Transport Technik; Setra
- Products: Commercial Vehicles

Karl Kässbohrer Fahrzeugwerke GmbH was a German vehicle manufacturer in Ulm. Its products were buses, coaches, vehicle transporters, trailers and special vehicles like snow groomer vehicles. The group broke up in 1995 due to economic problems and was acquired by Daimler Truck, which continues to produce under the brand name Setra.

== History ==
In 1893, Karl Kässbohrer founded the Wagenfabrik Kässbohrer in Ulm. In 1922, Kässbohrer developed a trailer for goods transport, having solid rubber wheels. When Karl Kässbohrer senior died in 1922, his sons, Karl junior and Otto Kässbohrer, took over the company and began to produce the first 2x4 axle trailers. In 1928, Karl and Otto purchased Ulmer Karosseriefabrik Neuer & Thieme, a frame and body construction company, and focused on coach, bus, trailer and upper body production.

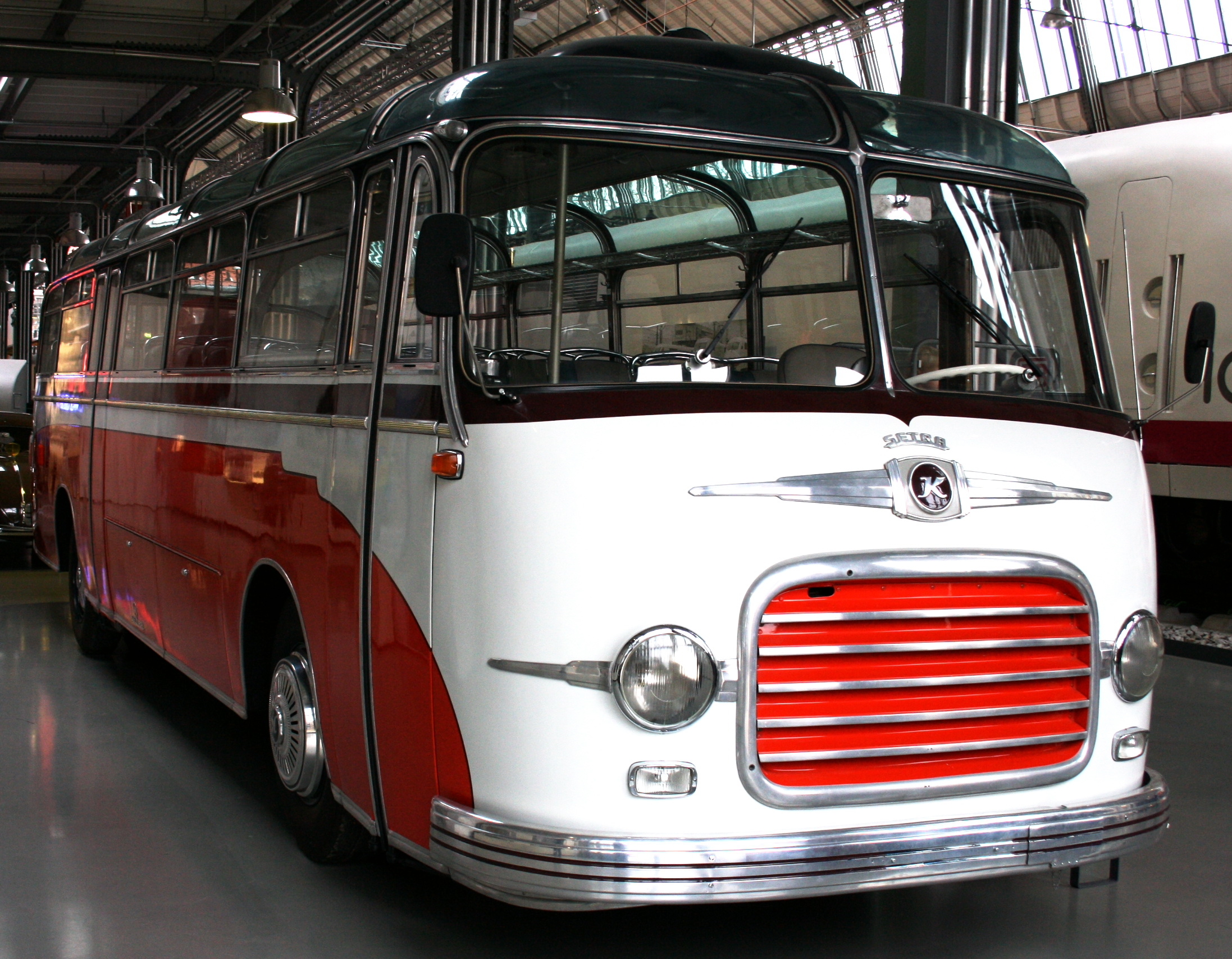
Setra S 11 H coach

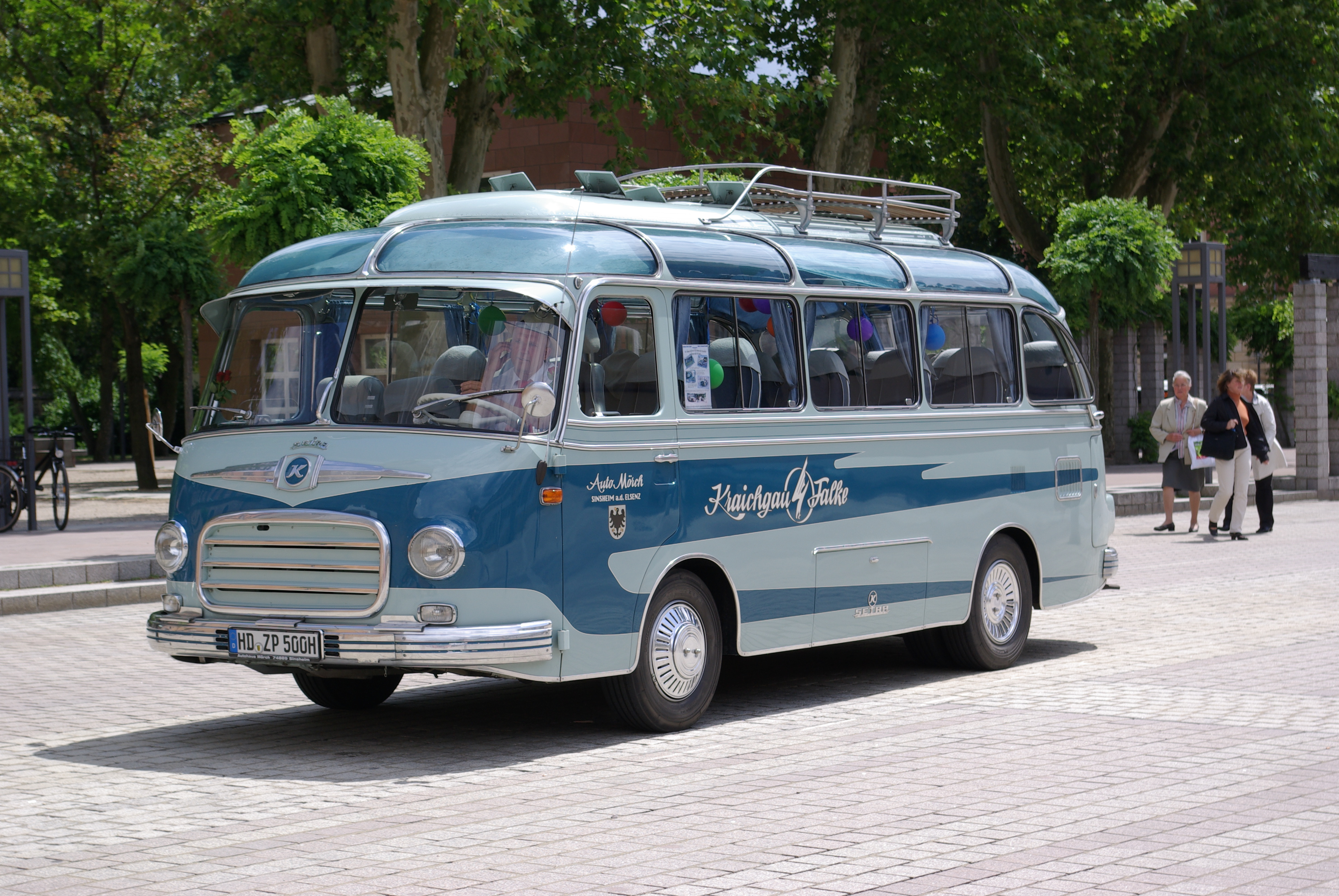
Setra S 6 coach

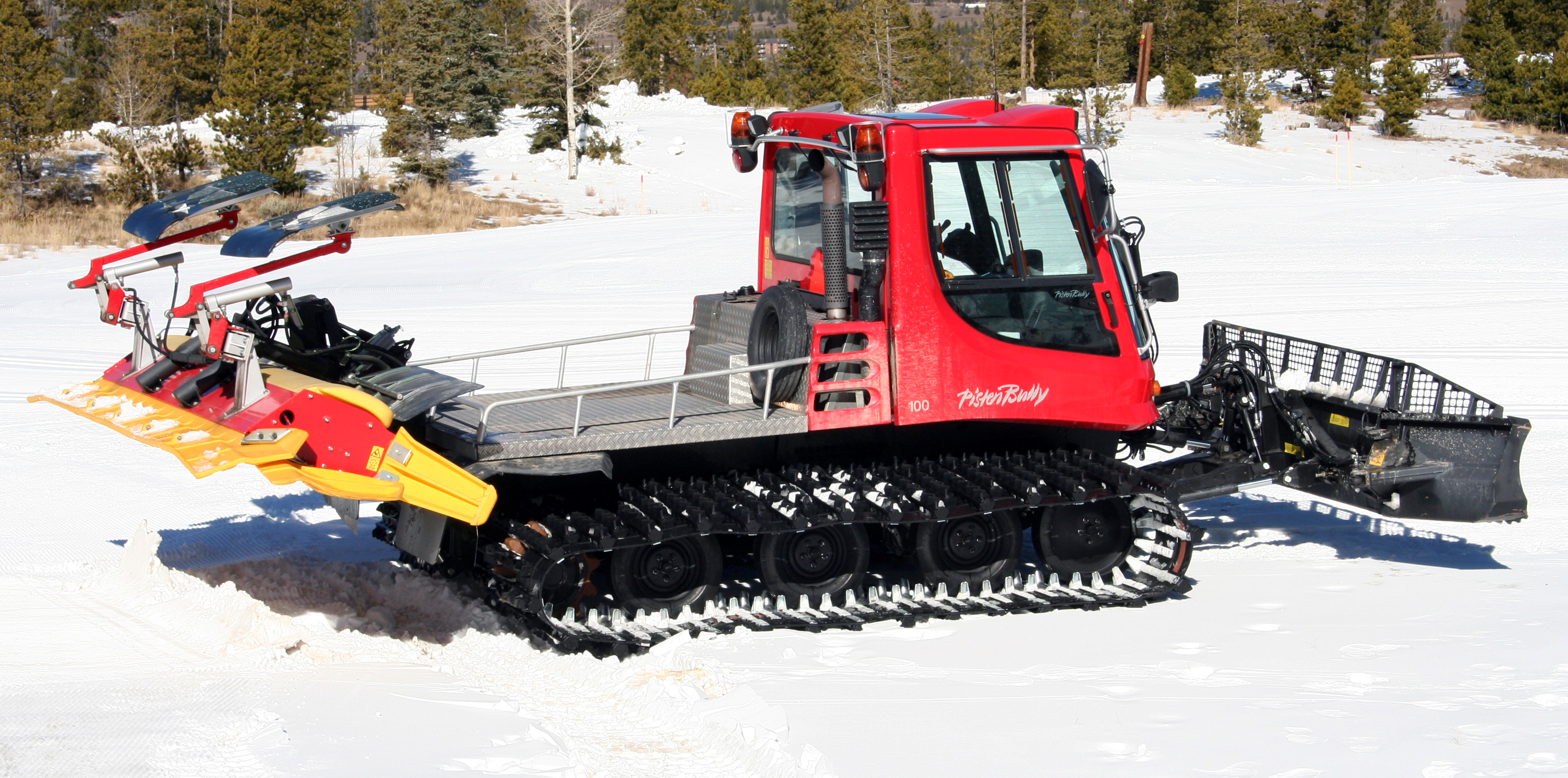
PistenBully 100

In 1931 Karl applied for a patent on semi-trailer coupling which was extremely reliable and low maintenance and further paved the way to 3-axle semi-trailers which changed the transportation industry. In the mid to late 1930s the first low-bed with 12 ton capacity was produced and the Kässbohrer Ulm factory in Peter-Schmid-Straße expanded to meet demand with staff numbers increasing from 300 to 1000 between the years 1934 and 1939. In 1969, Kässbohrer was Germany's biggest coach and truck trailer producer. On April 29, 1973, Karl Kässbohrer died. Kässbohrer's coaches and buses were named Setra. The snow-grooming vehicles were called PistenBully and 2,000 were sold between 1979 and 1989. At the end of the 1990s, about 9,000 employees worked for Kässbohrer.

Starting in 1993, the company began falling apart. The division's truck bodies, semi-trailers and trailers were sold to the competitor Kögel. In 1994 the snow groomer and beach cleaner division was bought out by management and became Kässbohrer Geländefahrzeug. Daimler bought the bus and coach division in 1995 and the new name EvoBus was introduced. The only division which is still family owned is Kässbohrer Transport Technik Gmbh in Salzburg, Austria, which builds vehicle transporters. There is also a current Kässbohrer Fahrzeugwerke in Goch, Germany, manufacturing trailers for commercial vehicles, and is since 2002 part of the Tirsan group.

A great number of Kässbohrer Setra coaches and buses are still in service on European roads, sometimes having a mileage of more than a million kilometers.

== See also ==
- Ankai
- Eagle Bus
- Seida
- Setra
- Chavdar
