= Kässbohrer Geländefahrzeug =

German manufacturer of snow and beach groomers

Kässbohrer Geländefahrzeug AG
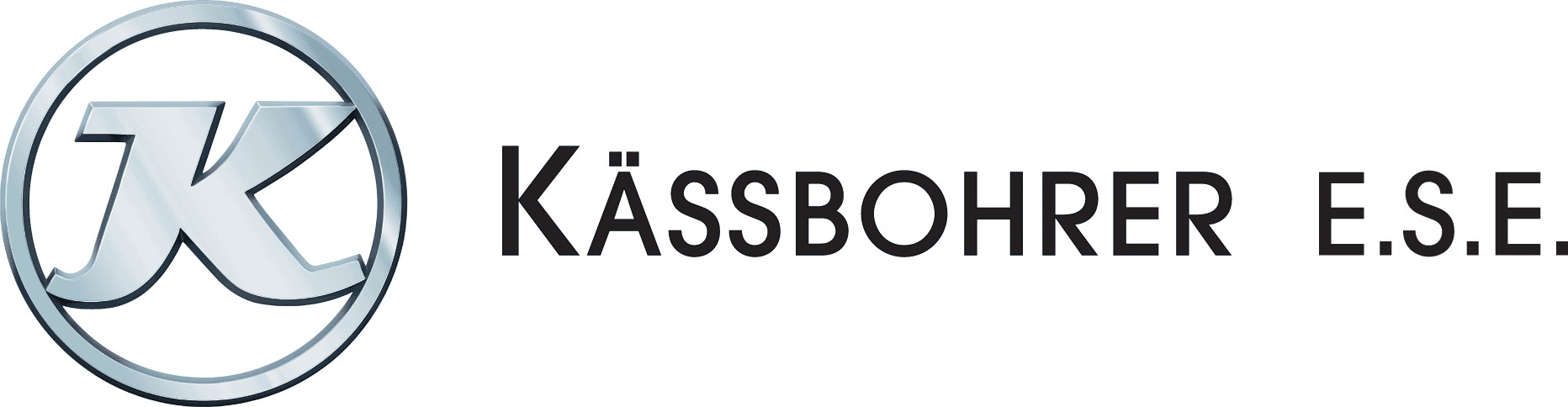
- Company type: Joint-stock company
- Industry: specialty vehicles
- Predecessor: Karl Kässbohrer Fahrzeugwerke GmbH
- Founded: 1994; 32 years ago
- Founder: Karl Heinrich Kässbohrer
- Headquarters: Kässbohrerstraße 11, Laupheim, Germany
- Area served: Worldwide
- Key people: Jens Rottmair (CEO)
- Brands: PistenBully; BeachTech; PowerBully; K Composites
- Owner: LuMe Vermögensverwaltung GmbH
- Subsidiaries: Kässbohrer E.S.E.; Kässbohrer Italia S.r.l.; Kässbohrer Austria GmbH; Kässbohrer Composites GmbH; Kässbohrer Schweiz AG; Kässbohrer All Terrain Vehicles Inc.
- Website: www.kaessbohrerag.com

Kässbohrer Geländefahrzeug AG is a German specialized vehicle manufacturer based in Laupheim. It is the worldwide market leader in snow grooming and sand cleaning machines marketed under the brands PistenBully and BeachTech.

== History ==
The company was formed in 1994 through a management buyout of the snow and sand divisions during the breakup of Karl Kässbohrer Fahrzeugwerke. It was publicly traded from 1998 until it was taken private in 2015, when Ludwig Merckle's LuMe holding company, which had previously owned over 95% of shares, bought out minority shareholders for an aggregate EUR 13.8 million.

== Products ==
=== PistenBully ===
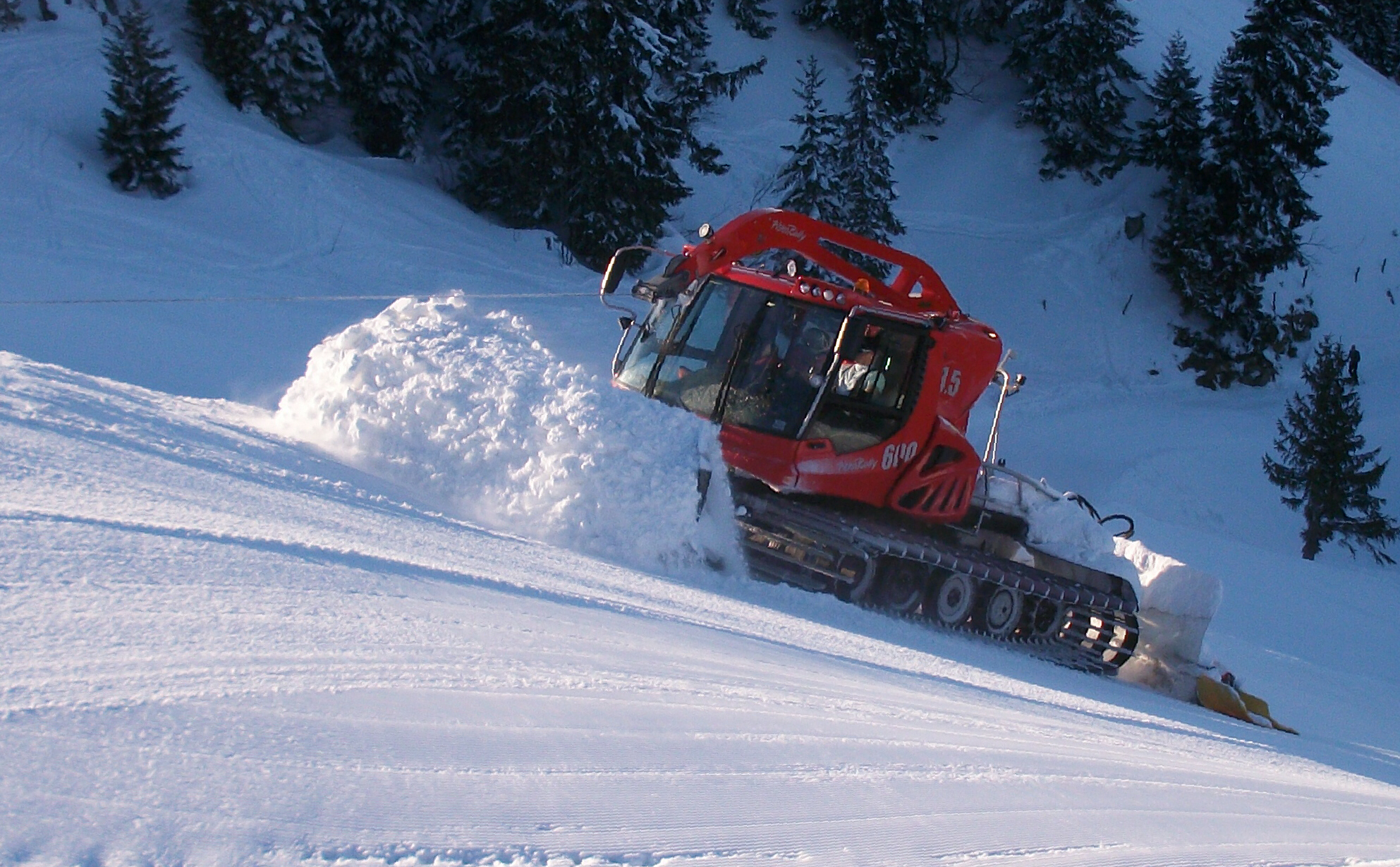
Snowcat model PistenBully PB 600 W SCR

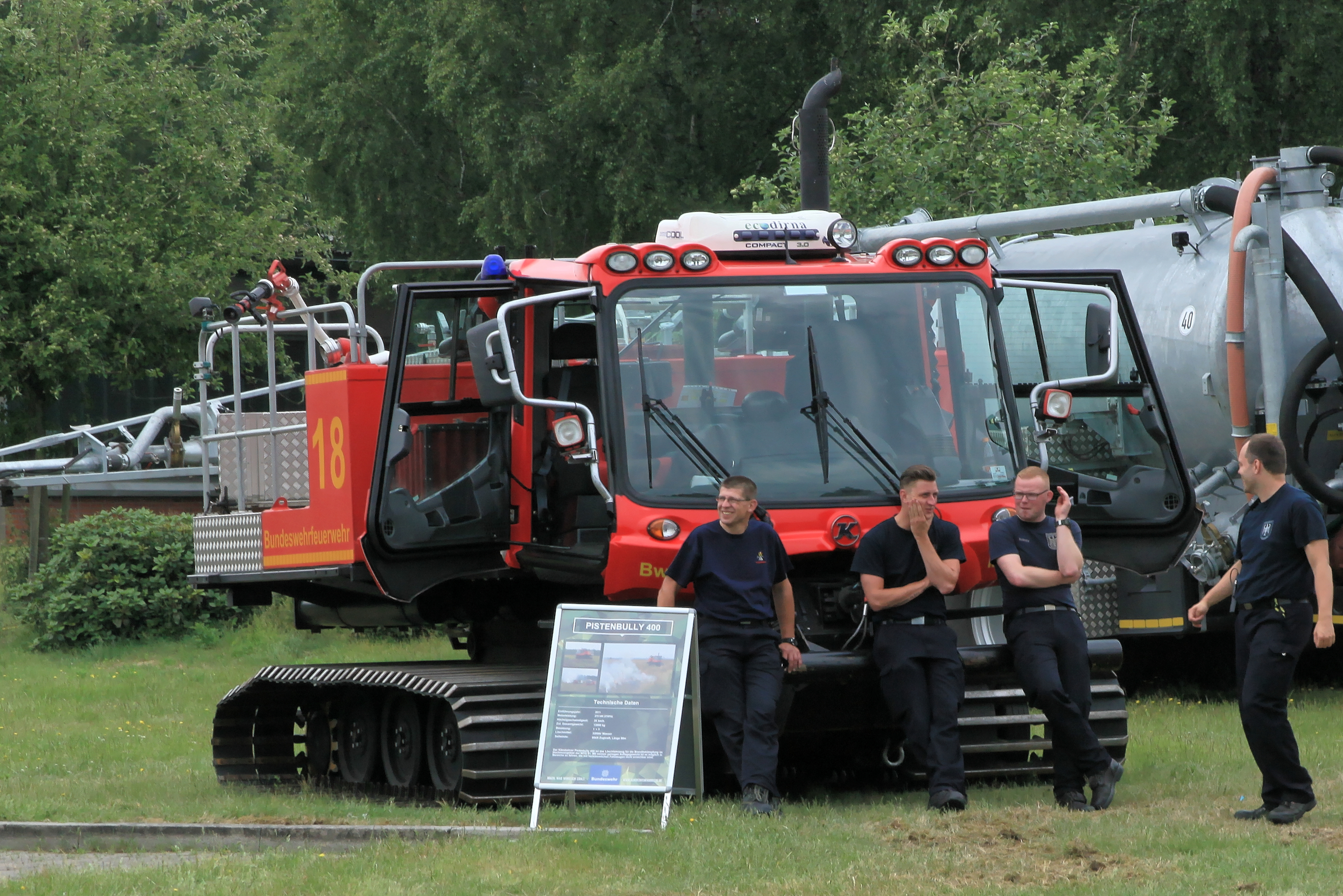
Tracked firefighting vehicle Pistenbully 400 W

Kässbohrer's largest division is snow grooming vehicles, which represents 90% of the company's revenue. The division develops, manufactures, sells and services equipment for maintaining ski hills. The PistenBully brand dominates the worldwide market for such machinery.

=== BeachTech ===
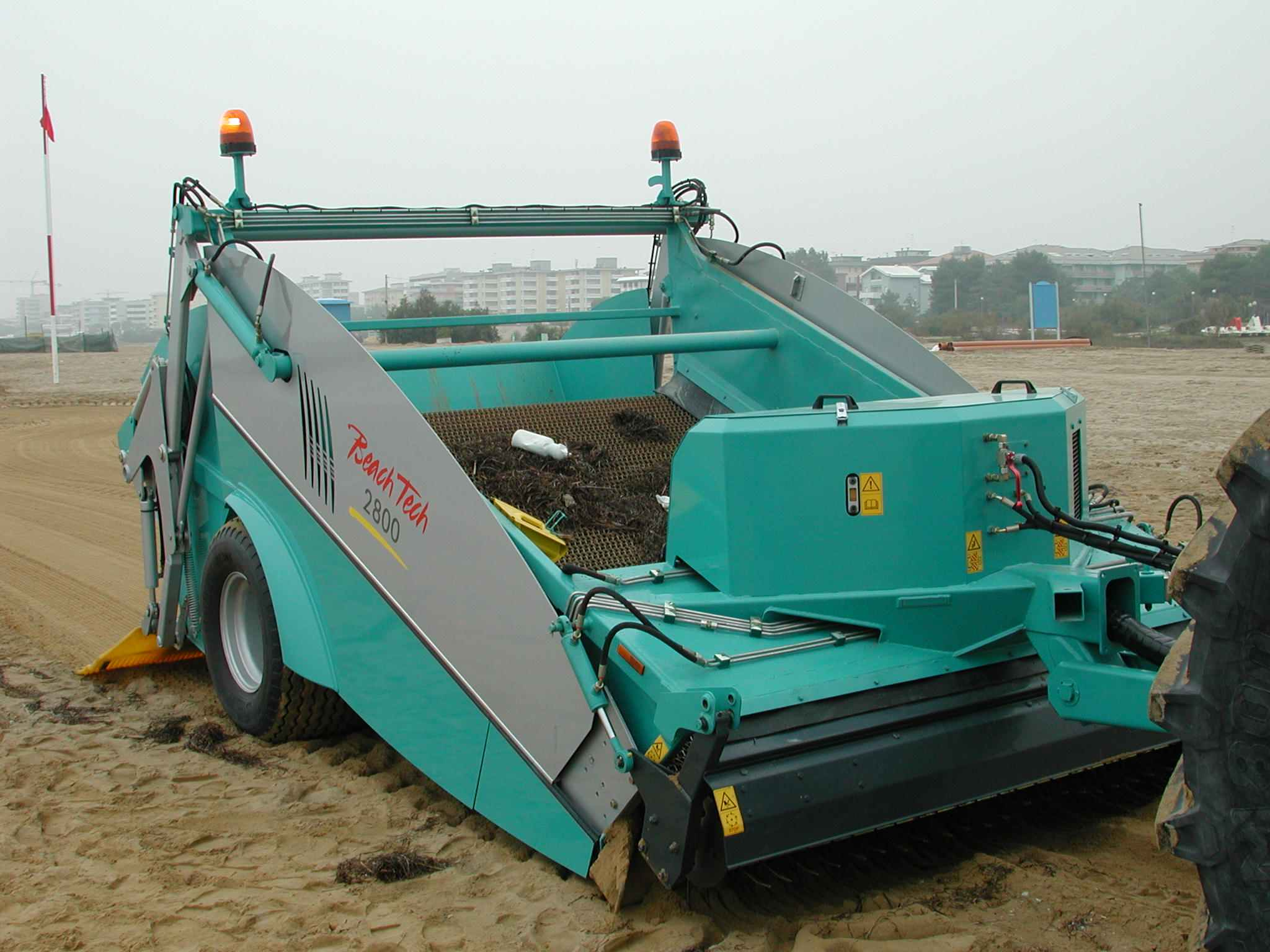
Kässbohrer BeachTech 2800

Kässbohrer launched a separate line of beach grooming machines in 1991.

=== PowerBully ===
In 2014, Kässbohrer acquired Soft Track Supply Inc., a manufacturer of niche tracked utility vehicles, and renamed the product line PowerBully. Soft Track had operated since 1989 and was based in Cartersville, Georgia.

== See also ==
- Setra
