= Setra =

German bus manufacturer

- Type: Brand
- Industry: Automotive
- Predecessor: Karl Kässbohrer Fahrzeugwerke GmbH
- Founded: 1951
- Products: Tourist bus, city buses, intercity buses
- Owner: Daimler Truck
- Parent: Daimler Buses
- Website: www.setra-bus.com

Setra is a German bus brand of Daimler Buses, itself a wholly owned subsidiary of Daimler Truck AG.

The name "Setra" comes from "selbsttragend" (self-supporting). This refers to the integral nature of the construction of the vehicles back in the 1950s when competitor vehicles still featured a separate chassis and body (often manufactured by separate companies). It is also possible that, with an eye to export markets, the company was mindful that for non-German speakers, the name "Kässbohrer" is difficult to pronounce. Until 1995 the firm operated under the name Karl Kässbohrer Fahrzeugwerke GmbH, but in that year economic difficulties enforced its sale to Daimler-Benz AG (between 1998 and 2008 known, especially in the United States, by the name of its holding company Daimler Chrysler). Since 1995, Setra has been a brand of the Daimler subsidiary, EvoBus GmbH.

The North American distribution for Setra was taken over Motor Coach Industries on April 25, 2012; this agreement lasted until the end of 2017 when the REV Group assumed distribution responsibilities. Daimler has again self-distributed Setra coaches in North America since January 2020, through its new subsidiary, Daimler Coaches North America, LLC, with service support from Daimler Truck North America.

Setra S 80 coach in Tallinn, Estonia.

== History ==
The first Setra coach, S8, was unveiled in 1951 during the International Motor Show (IAA) in Frankfurt am Main, where it was shown at the premises of a local Kässbohrer general representative. The launch also introduced the brand name: "Setra" is short for "selbsttragend", the German word for "self-supporting", which refers to the coach's monocoque construction.

The S 8 was the first integral bus built in Germany, with the chassis and body combined into a single load-bearing structure. It was also the first series-production bus to pair a self-supporting body with a rear-mounted engine driving the rear axle directly. Together with its streamlined styling and large luggage compartments, this layout set new benchmarks in European coach building, and later Setra models helped the self-supporting design spread quickly through the market.

== Models ==
The maximum number of seat rows can be identified by the type designation. In the first Setra series, the number of seats was alone. In the second series (series 100), a 0 or 5 was affixed, and one of the numbers preceded in each of the following series (series 200, 300, and 400). Example: S 8 (= 8 seat rows), S 140 (= 14 seat rows), S 215 (= 15 seat rows), S 417 (= 17 seat rows), or S 319 UL (= 19 seat rows). The seats are reduced by comforter buildings or a certain star classification; The type designation is retained. Starting from the series 200, additions after the number indicated the equipment: current (series 400/500) are H for high-floor construction (no wheel arches in the passenger compartment), HD for high floor, HDH for an extra-high floor, DT for double-deck touring bus, MD for mid-height floor (a spinoff of the GT series), UL for interurban commuter buses and NF for low-floor buses. In the past, the Grand Tourisme (GT), HDS for double-deck, SL for city buses, and NR (low-floor Rational) were used for the first highway low-floor (200 series). Only a few types were given different designations, for example, the S 250 Special (a modified S 215 HD which was also offered as an entry-level model after the introduction of the 300 series) and the S 300 NC (a former low-floor city bus as a predecessor of the Mercedes-Benz Citaro).

The different models of the 200 series also bore the name designations with name suffixes, whereby the designation International (with the letter I appended to the type designation) for travel and combi-buses with simplified heating/ventilation was used. The term Communal and Regional were used for regular services, and Rational for travel combination models. The short-term offered club bus model based on the S 210 H deviated from the name Real. Air-conditioned high-floor buses were called Optimal, the double-deck S 216 HDS Royal and the double-deck S 228 DT Imperial. The export version of the 215 HDH for the US market (later on, the HDH model for the local market was based) was called Transcontinental. Some of these designations still existed with the introduction of the 300 series, as for the S 328 DT, at the latest with the introduction of the 400 series, these name additions with the division into MultiClass, ComfortClass and TopClass were abandoned. Additionally, the name Business has been produced in Turkey since 2013, with simpler equipment.

=== Current ===
	-07	-11/-12	-15	-16	-17/-18	-19	-31
MultiClass 400		S 412 UL	S 415 H S 415 UL; S 415 UL business S 415 LE business	S 416 H S 416 UL; S 416 UL business S 416 LE business	S 417 UL; S 417 UL business S 418 LE business	S 419 UL	
ComfortClass 400	S 407 CC (North America)						
TopClass 400					S 417 TC (North America)		S 431 DT
ComfortClass 500		S 511 HD	S 515 HD; S 515 MD	S 516 HD; S 516 HD/2; S 516 MD	S 517 HD	S 519 HD	
TopClass 500			S 515 HDH	S 516 HDH	S 517 HDH		S 531 DT

=== Historic ===
-06/-07	-08	-09	-10	-11	-12	-13	-14	-15	-16	-17/-18	-19/-20	-21	-28
First generation (1951)
S6; S7	S8	S9	S10	S11	S12		S14	S15					
Second generation (1967) - Setra S100
	S80		S110		S120	S130S	S140ES	S150		SG180M; SG180U; SG180UL; SG180S			
Third generation (1976) - Setra S 200
	S208H; S208HM; S208HMU; S208HU	S209H; S209HM; S209HMU; S209HU	S210H; S210HD; S210HI; S210HM; S210HMU; S210HU	S211H; S211HD; S211HDI; S211HDU; S211HI; S211HM; S211HMU; S211HU	S212H; S212HM; S212HMU; S212HU	S213H; S213HD; S213HDU; S213HI; S213HM; S213HMA; S213HMI; S213HMU; S213HR; S213HRI-GT; S213HUL; S213UL	S214H; S214HD; S214HDI; S214HDU	S215H; S215HD; S215HDH; S215HDI; S215HDS; S215HDU; S215HI; S215HM; S215HMI; S215HMU; S215HR; S215HRI-GT; S215HU; S215HUL; S215NR; S215RL; S215SL; S215UL; S250 Special	S216HDS; S216HDSI	S217HDH	SG219SL SG220HUL	S221HDS; SG221UL	S228DT; S228DTI
Fourth generation (1991) - Setra S 300
S300NC		S309HD			S312HD	S313UL; S313UL-GT		S315GT; S315GT-HD; S315H; S315HD; S315HDH/2; S315HDH/3; S315NF; S315UL; S315UL-GT	S316HDS; S316UL	S317GT-HD; S317HDH; S317UL; S317UL-GT	S319NF; S319UL; S319GT-HD	SG321UL	S328DT
Fifth generation (2001) - Setra S 400 MultiClass/ComfortClass/TopClass
				S411HD TopClass				S415NF MultiClass; S415GT ComfortClass; S415GT-HD; S415HD; S415HDH	S416NF; S416GT; S416GT-HD; S416GT-HD/2; S416HDH	S417GT-HD; S417HDH	S419GT-HD		
-06/-07	-08	-09	-10	-11	-12	-13	-14	-15	-16	-17/-18	-19/-20	-21	-28

Suffixes
DT	Doppelstock-Touristikbus	double-deck touring bus
HD	Hochdecker	high floor
HDH	Hochdecker high	extra-high floor
HDS	Superhochdecker	super-high floor (double-deck)
HR	Hochdecker Regional	high floor commuter
MD	Mitteldecker	mid(-height) floor
NR	Niederflur Rational	sloped (low) floor
UL	Überland	interurban

== Gallery ==
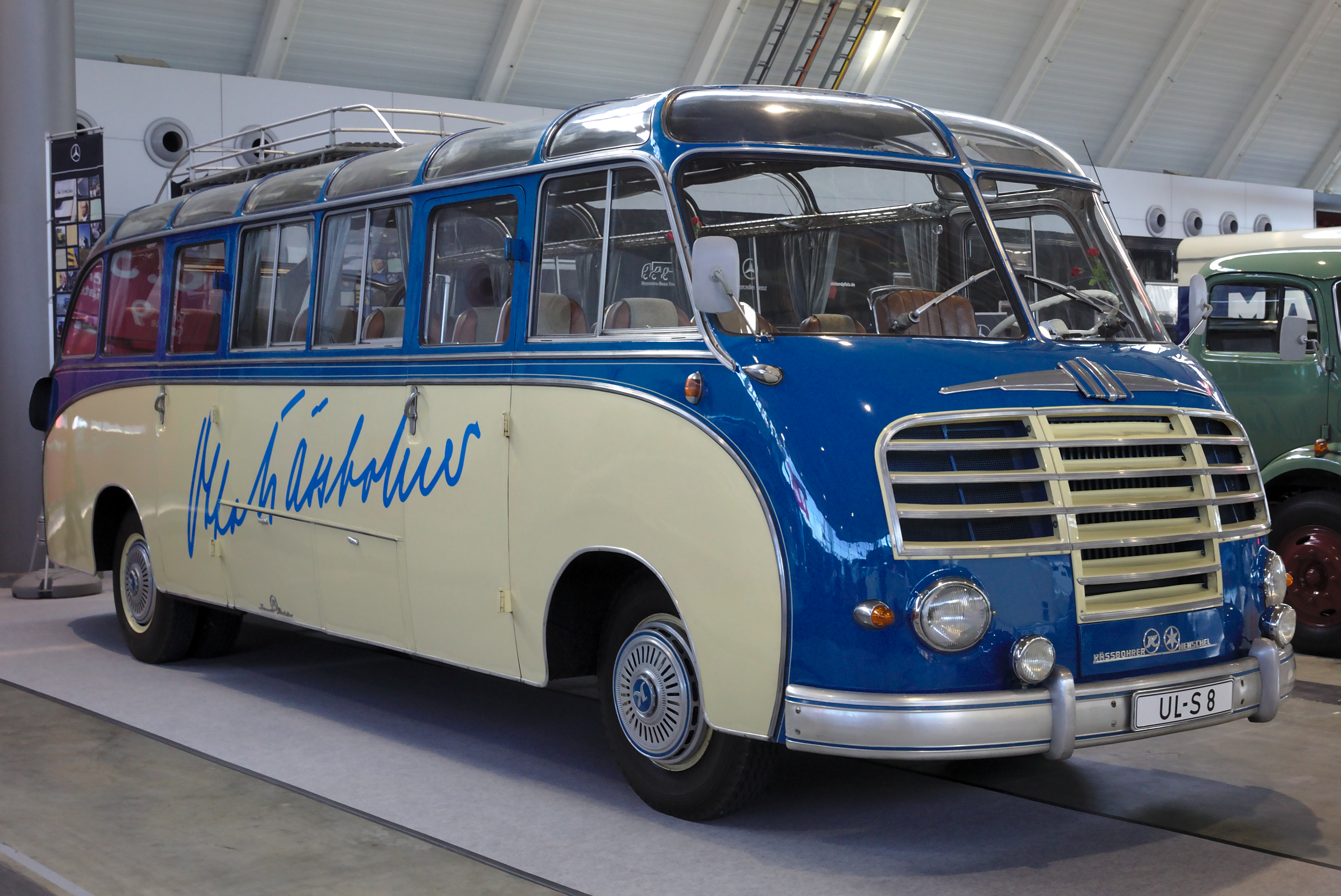
1951 Setra S8 French

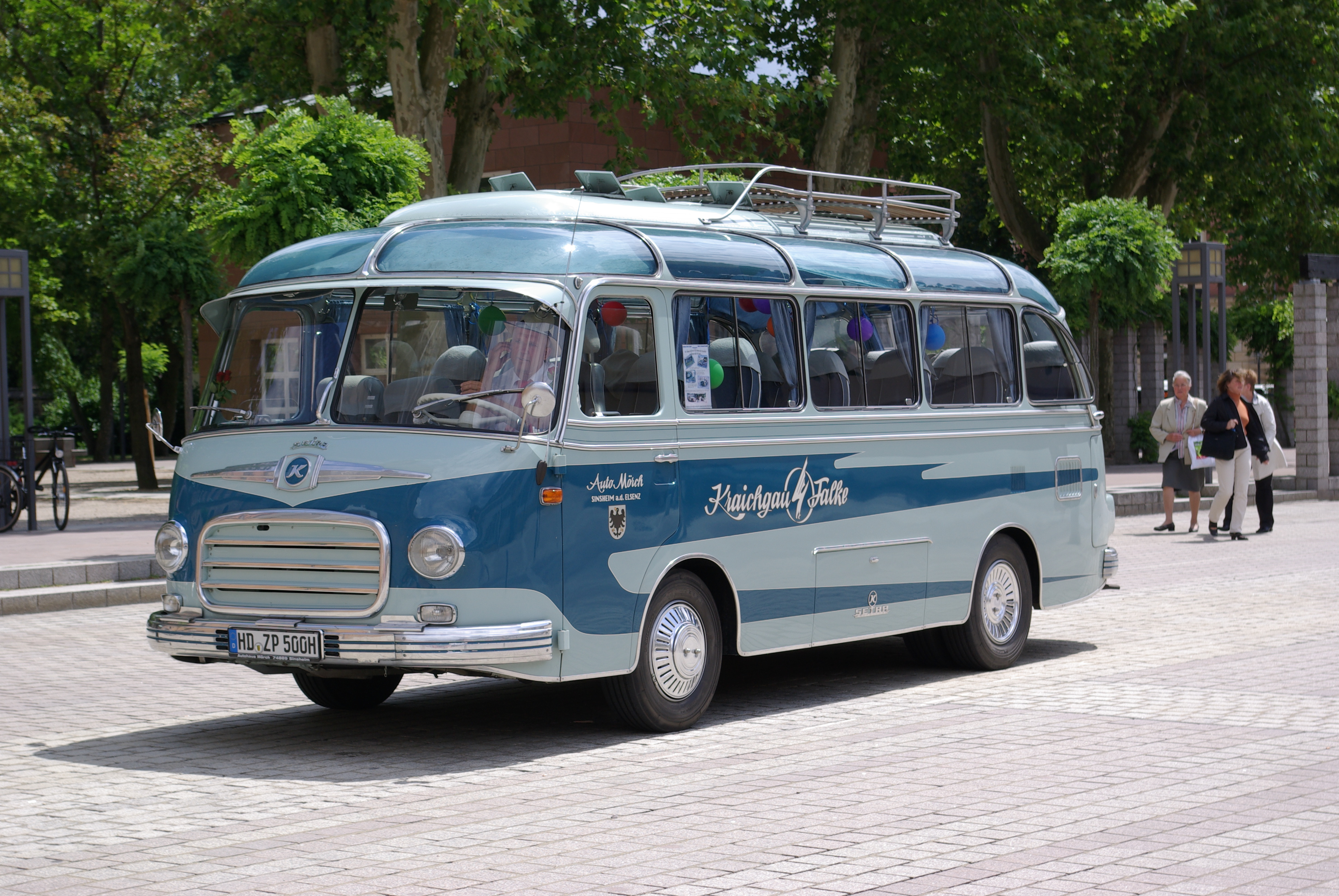
Setra S6 c. 1955

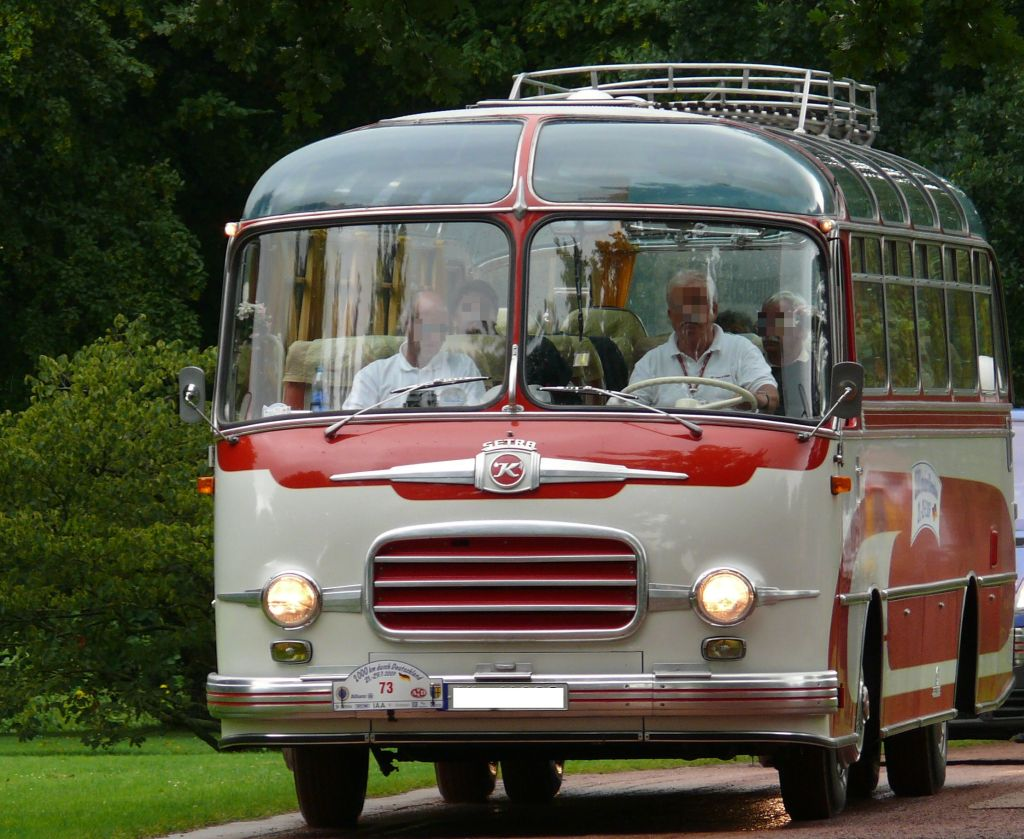
1959 Setra S9

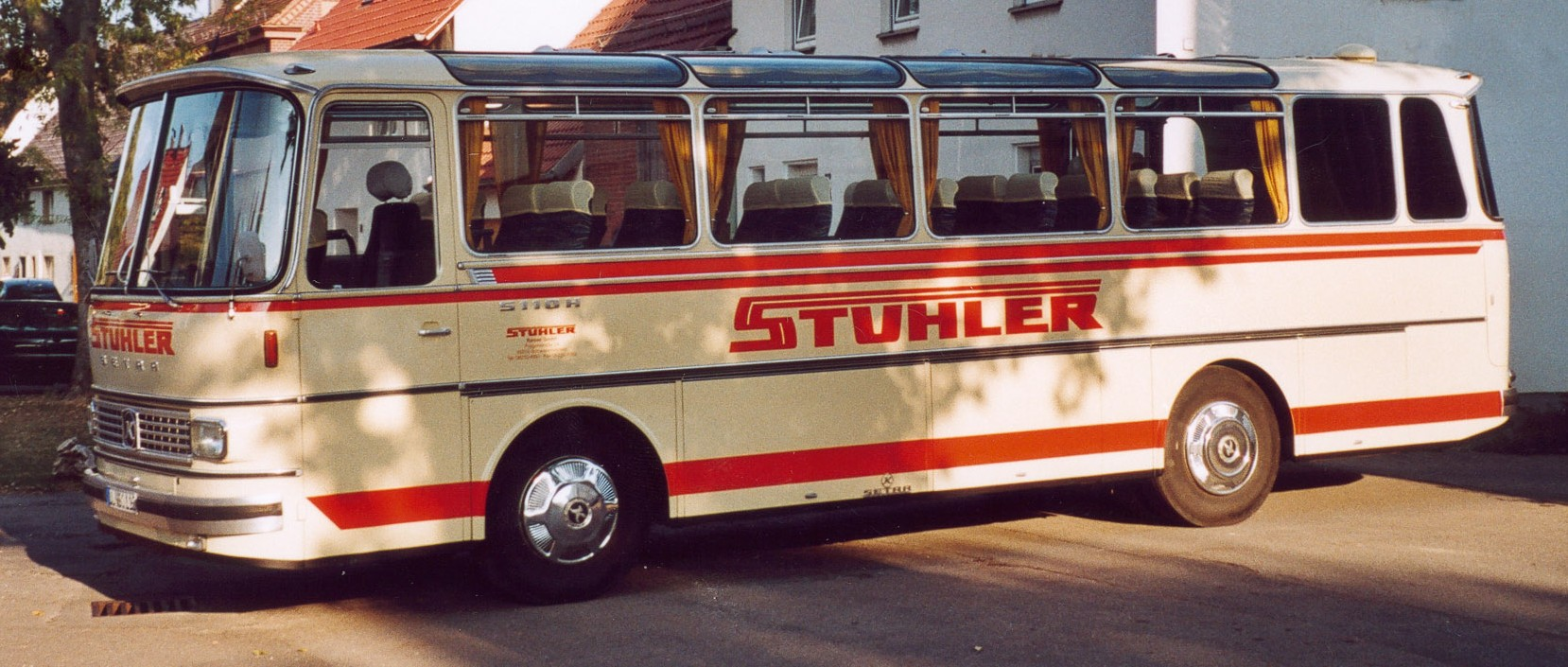
Setra S110H coach from 1972, Germany

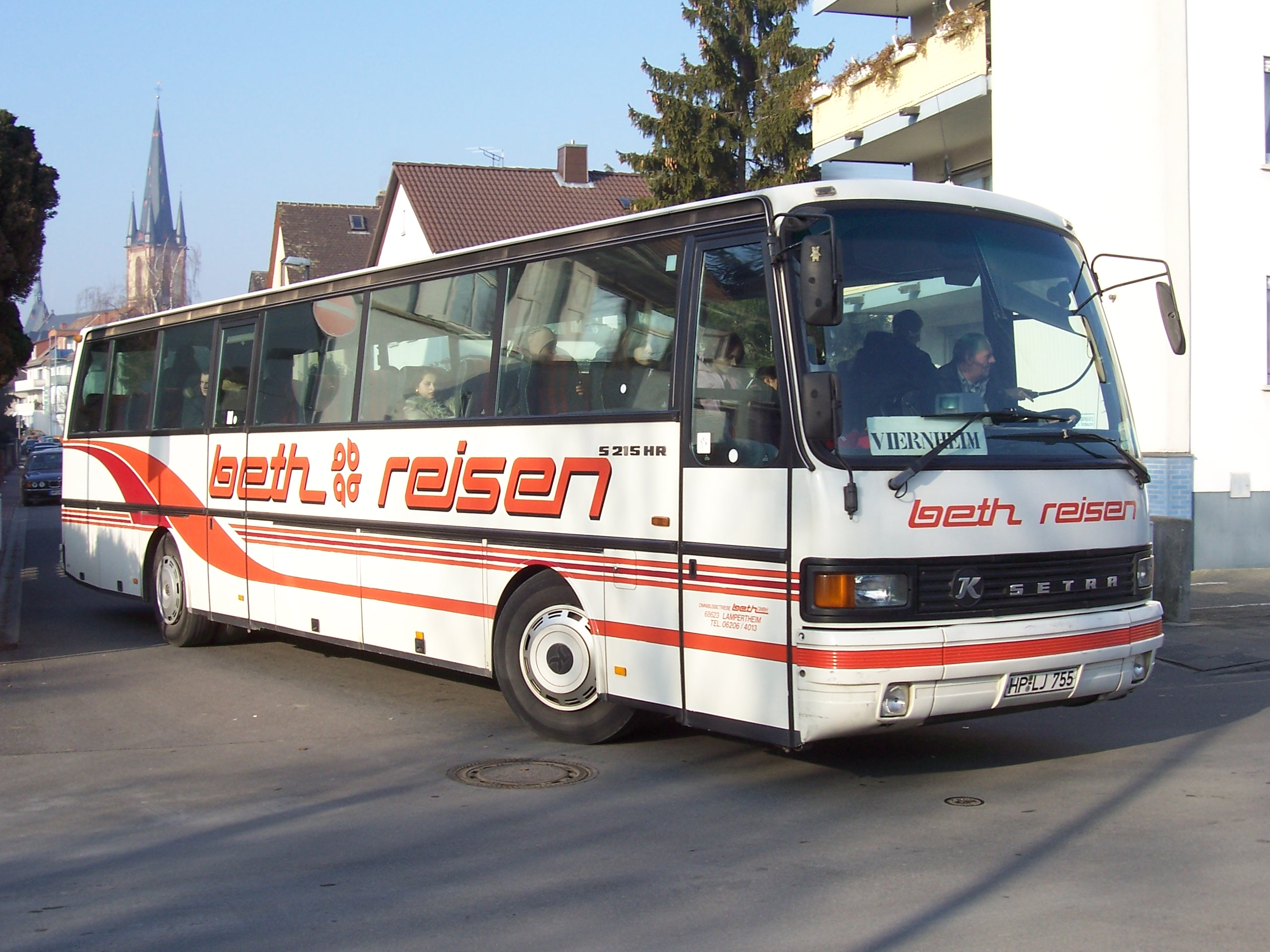
Setra S215HR (R = Regional)

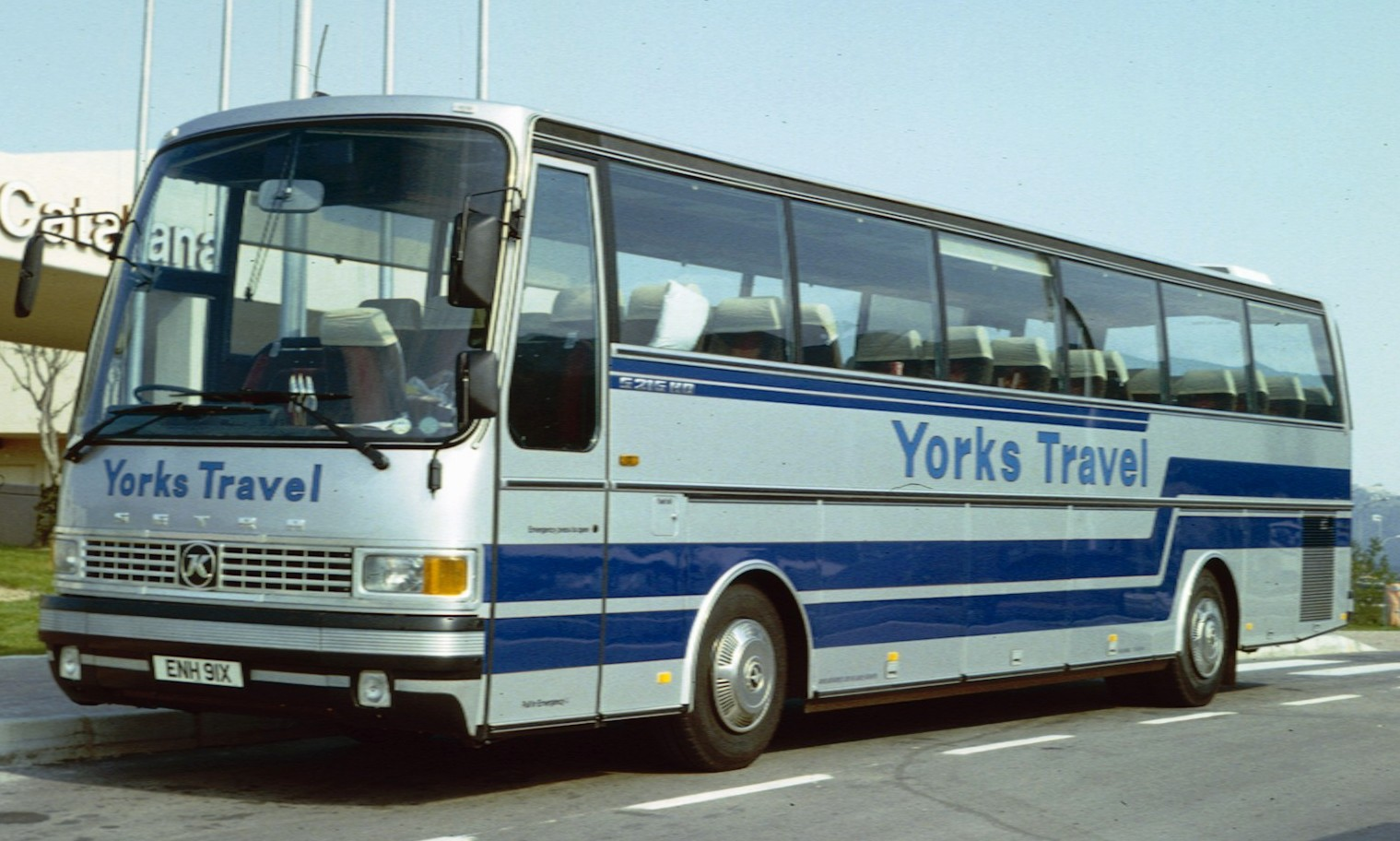
Setra S215HD (HD = High Deck) 1981

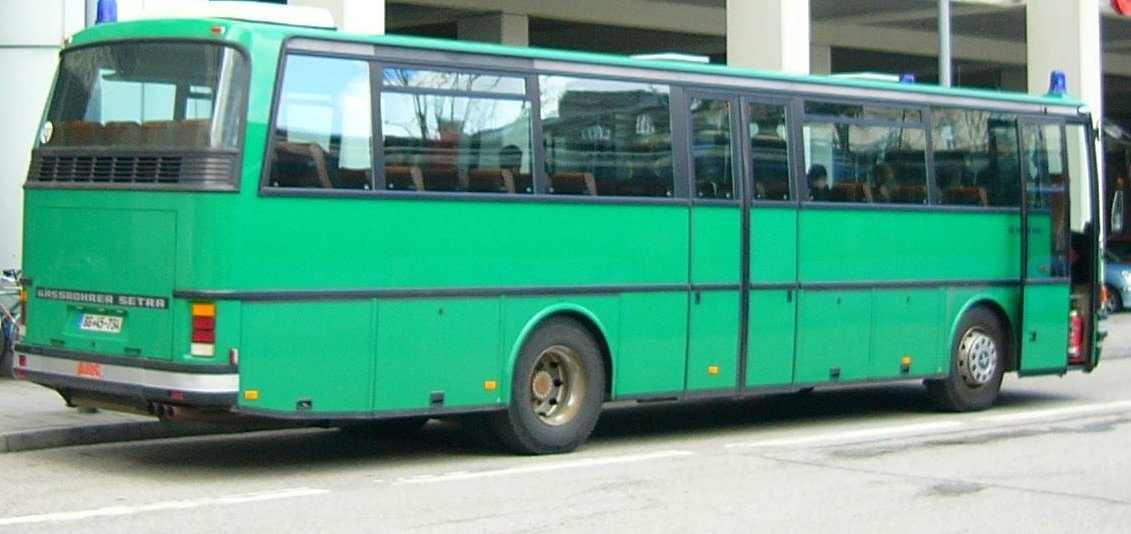
Kässbohrer Setra S215UL (Überland = interurban) German Police

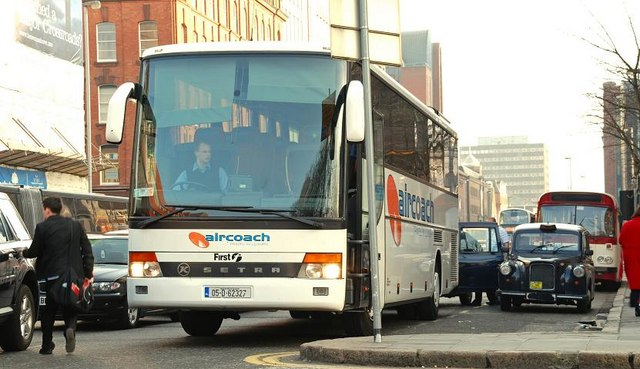
Setra S 315 GT-HD

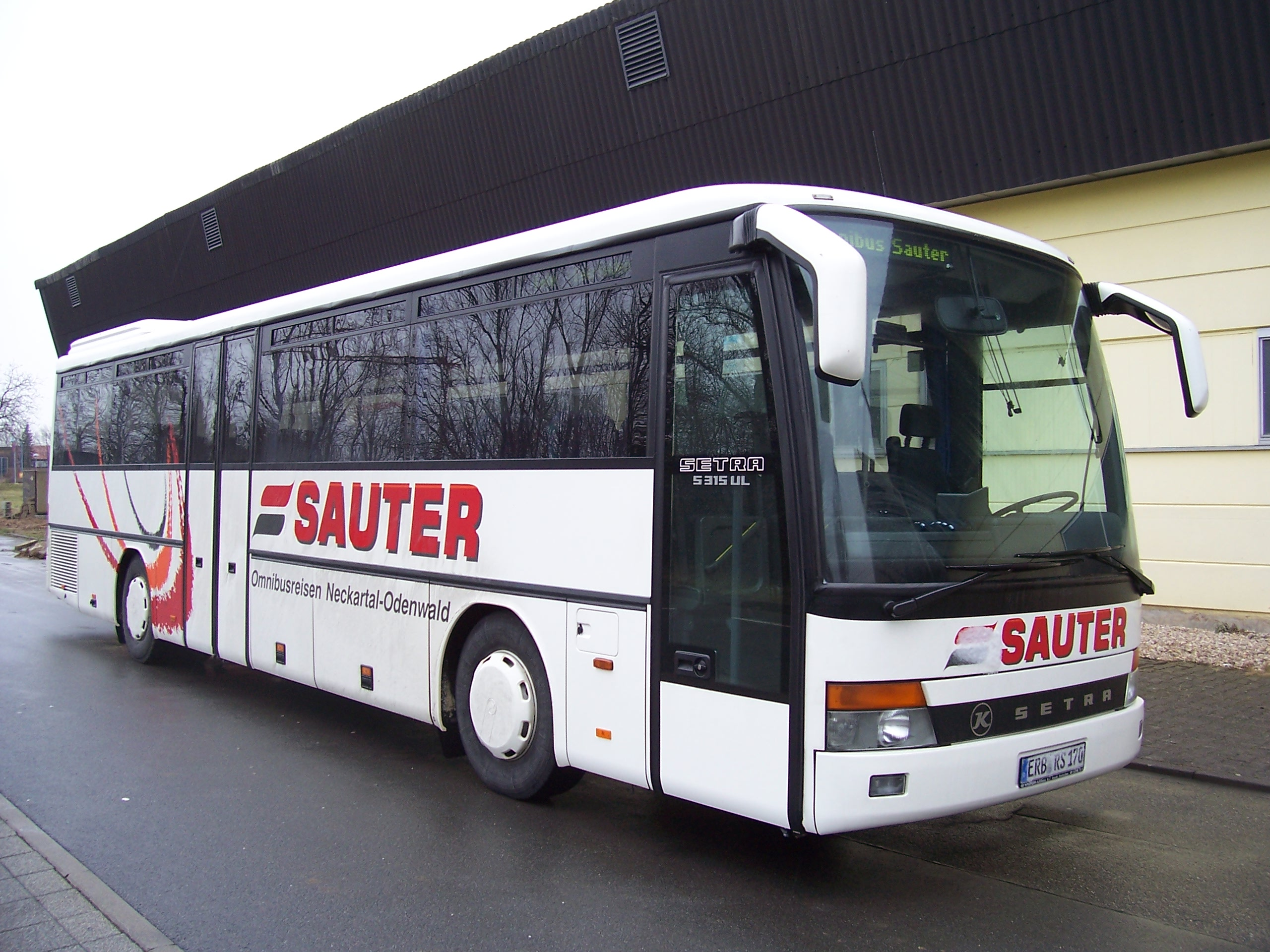
Setra S 315 UL

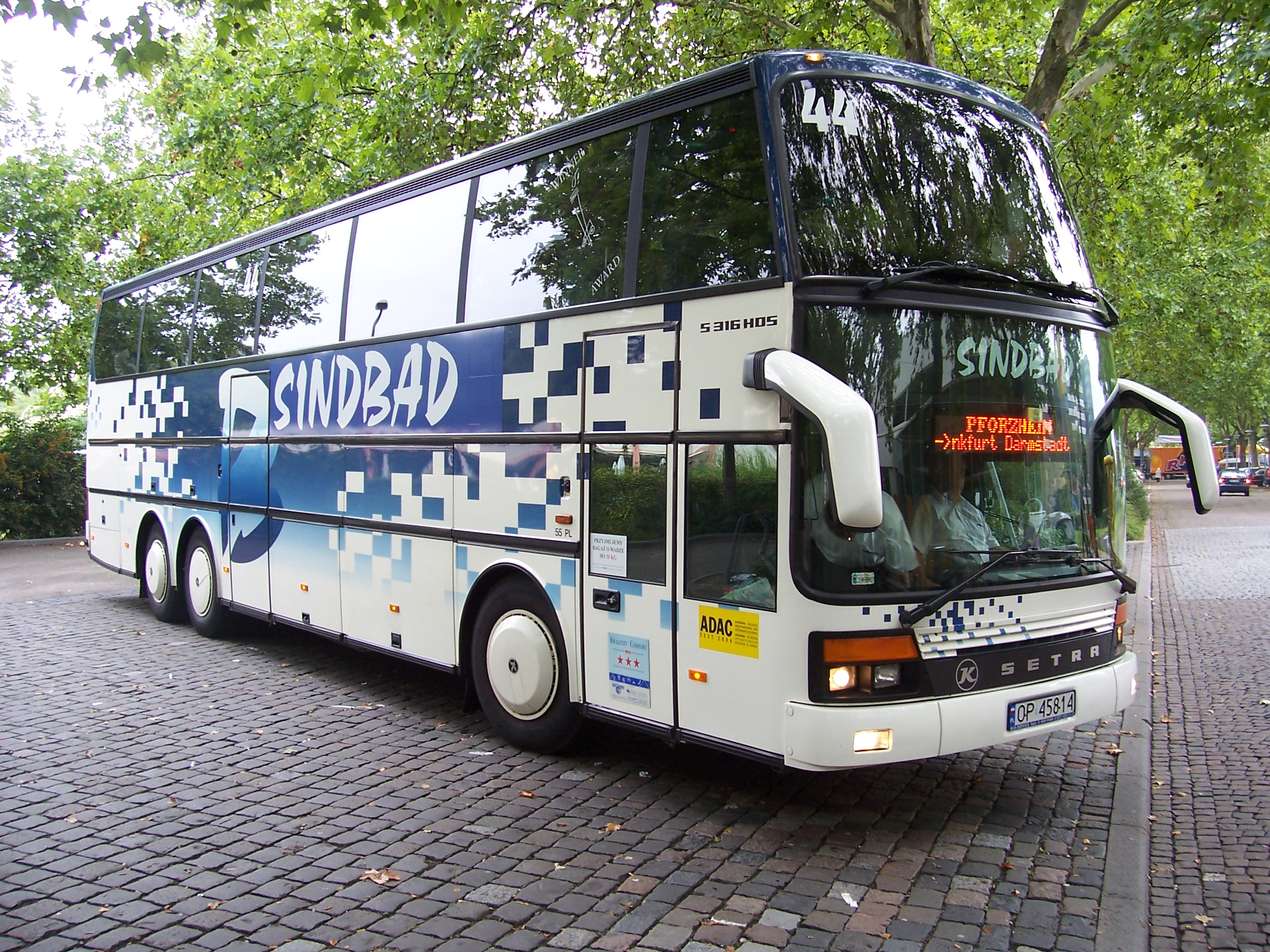
Setra S316 HDS

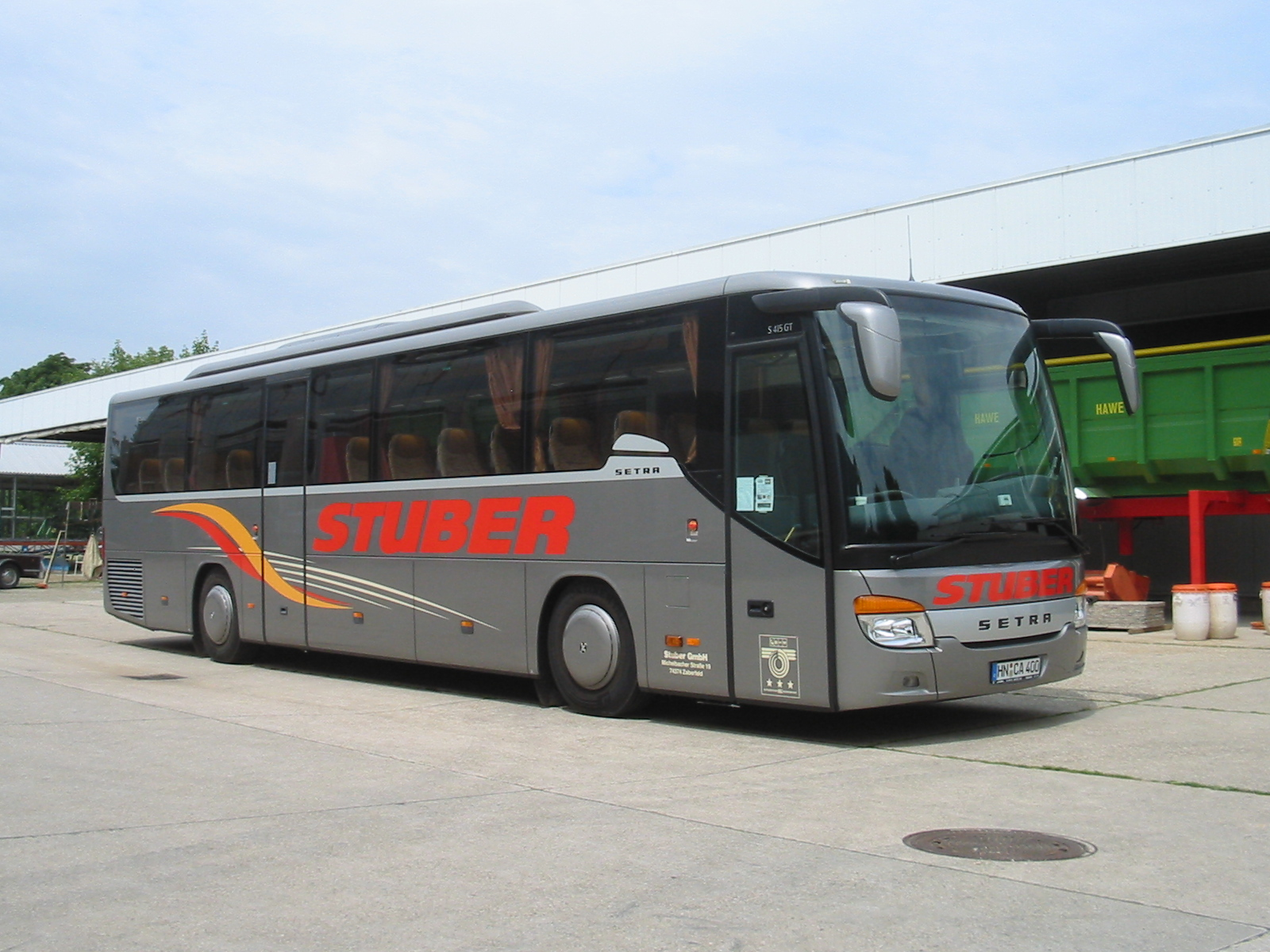
Setra S 415 GT

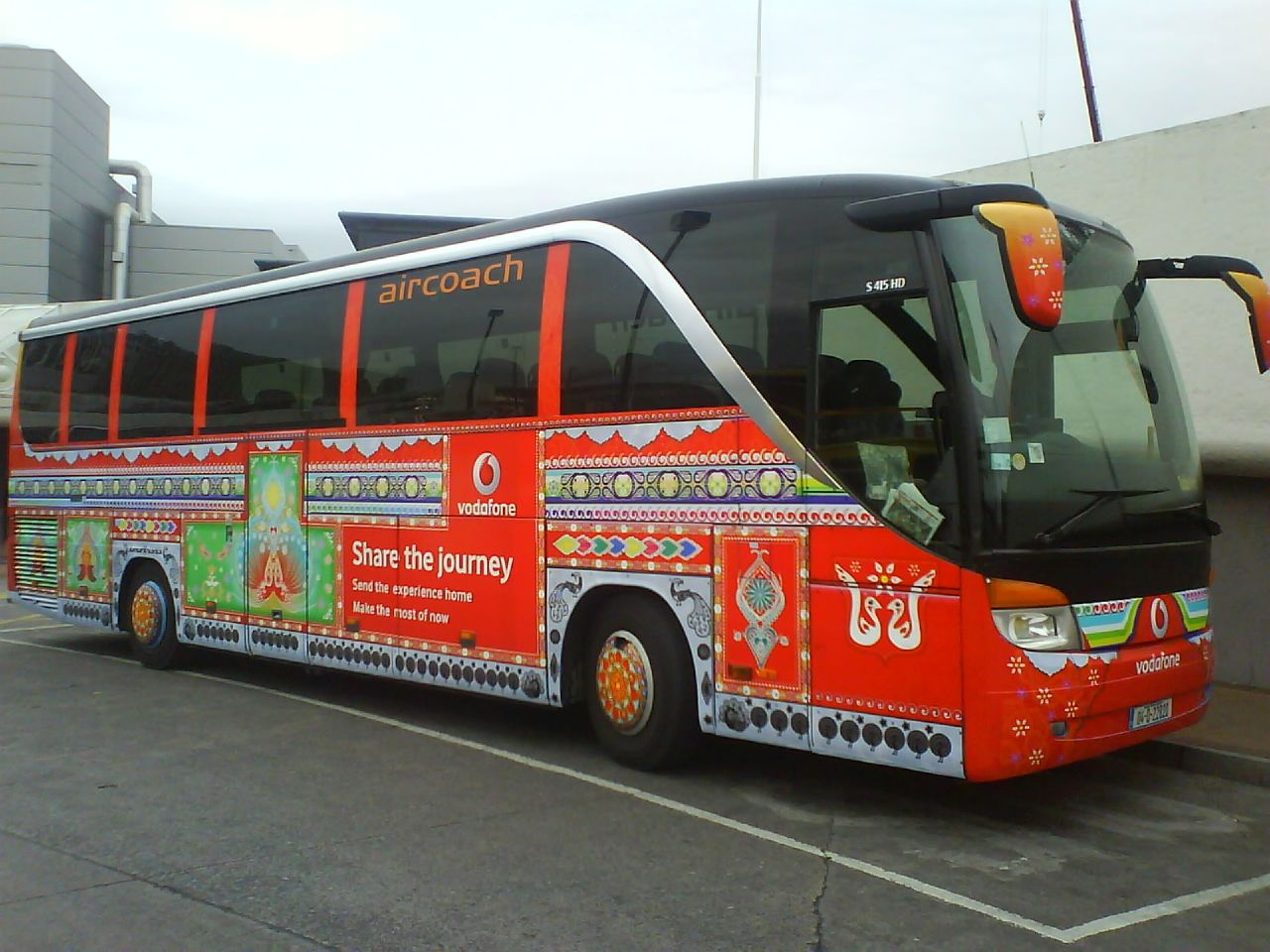
Setra S 415 HD

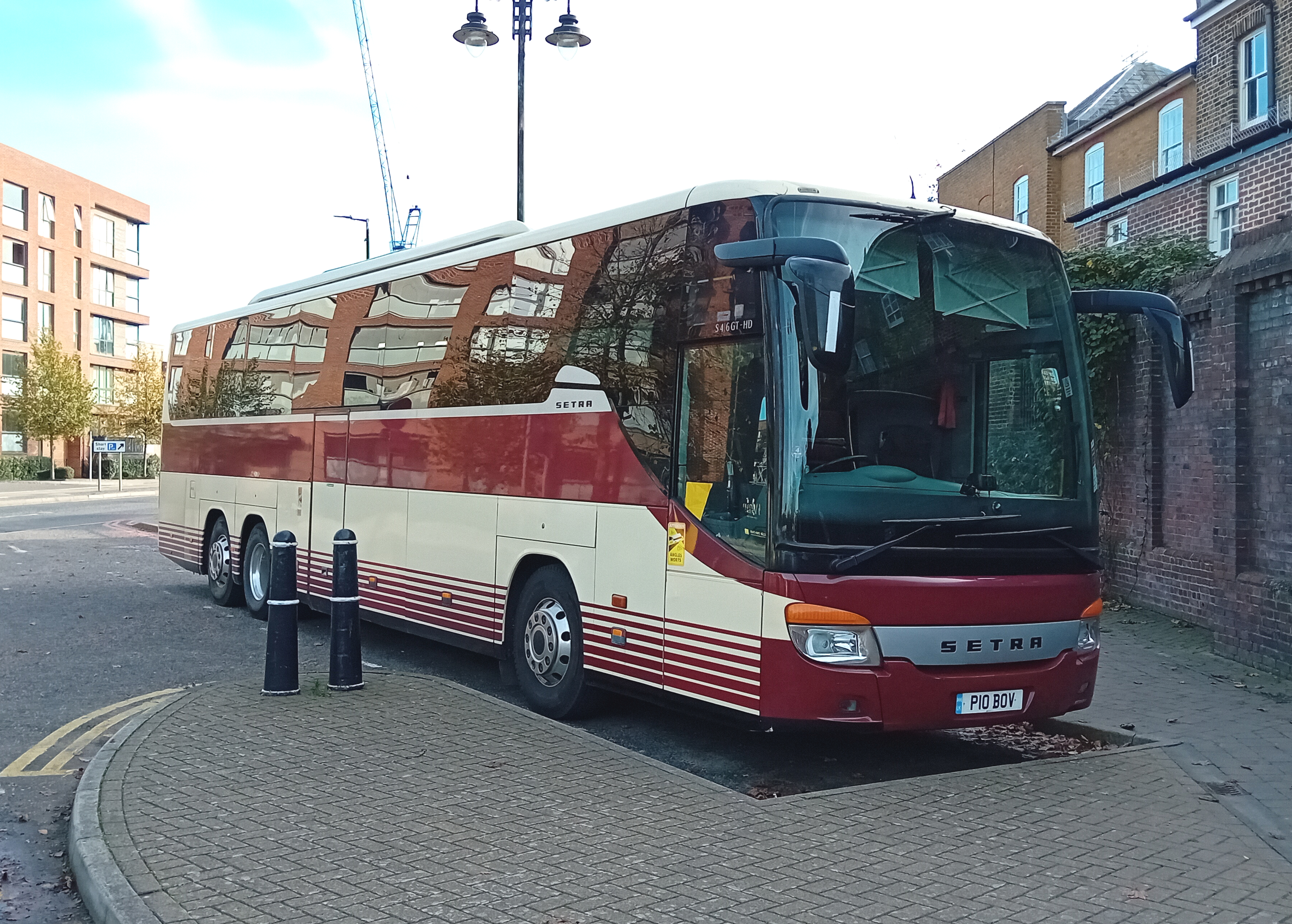
Setra S 416 GT, Rochester, Kent, England

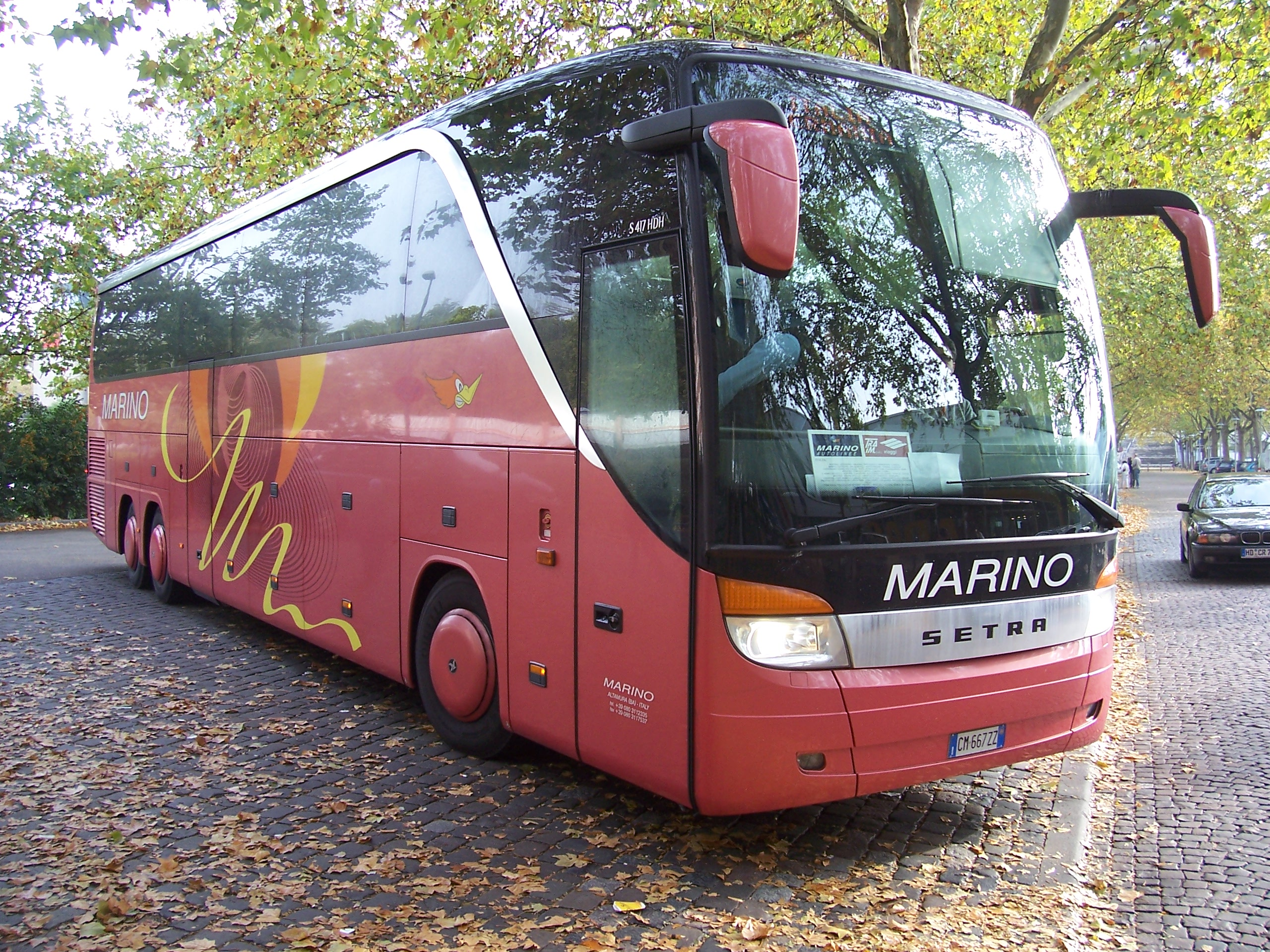
Setra S 417 HDH

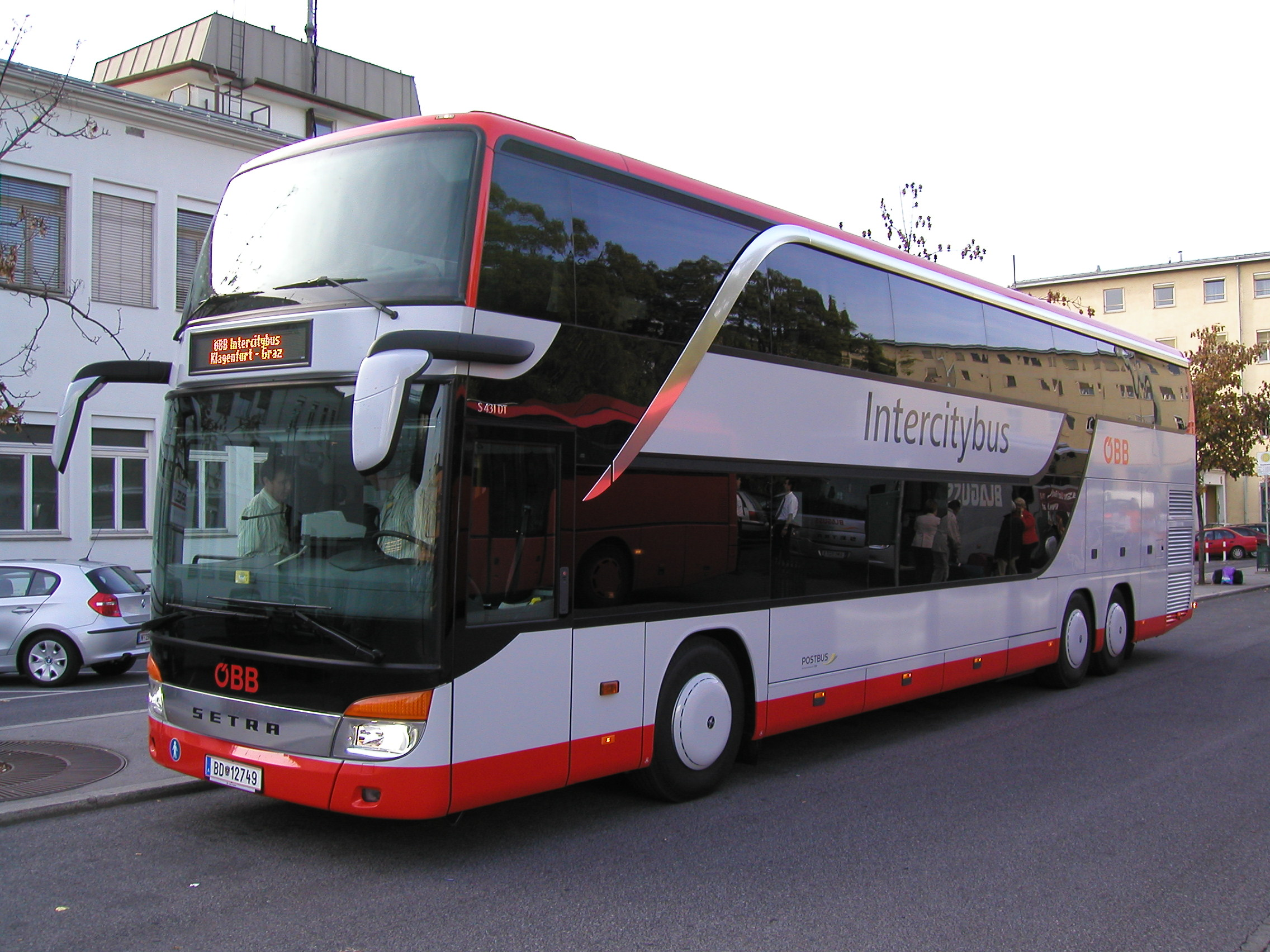
Setra S 431 DT

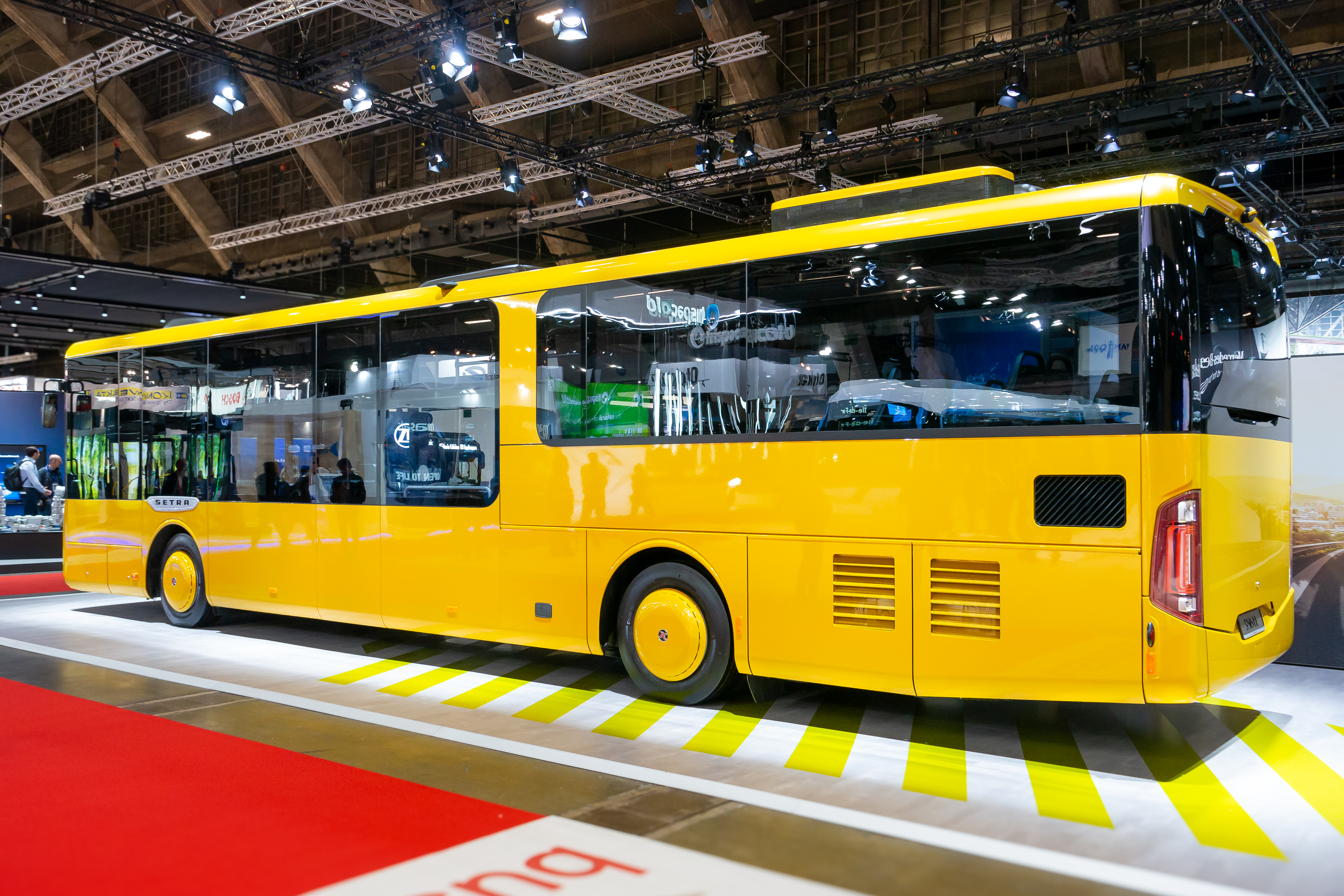
Setra S 515 LE

== See also ==
- Seida
- Chavdar
- Eagle Bus

== Sources ==
- Bollinger, Franz; Pflüger, Hellmut (1968). 75 Jahre Kässbohrer - 1893 bis 1968 - Festschrift - Erzeugnisse im Wandel der Zeit und aus der Chronik der Familie Kässbohrer [75 years of Kässbohrer - 1893 to 1968 - Festschrift - products in the course of time and from the chronicle of the Kässbohrer family] (in German). Ulm, Germany: Karl Kässbohrer Fahrzeugwerke. OCLC 74176766.
- Hanke, Dieter (1986). 75 Jahre Omnibusbau bei Kässbohrer 1911 - 1986: Vom Holzaufbau zum modernen Setra [75 Years of Bus Manufacturing at Kässbohrer 1911 - 1986: From wooden body to the modern Setra] (in German). Bonn: Omnisbusspiegel - Sonderdruck. ISBN 3925301690.
- Losemann, Jörg (1998). Aus dem Setra-Familienalbum: Die Vorfahren des Fortschritts [From the Setra Family Album: The Ancestors of Progress] (in German). Ulm, Germany: EvoBus GmbH Setra-Omnibusse. ISBN 3882942614.
- Mutard, Dieter (1995). Setra-Technologie Tradition und Innovation aus Ulm [Setra Technology Tradition and Innovation from Ulm] (in German). Ulm, Germany: DWM Pressebüro und Verlag / EvoBus GmbH Setra-Omnibusse. OCLC 312757012.
- ——————; Loeffler, Stefan (2001). Setra Omnibusse seit 1951 [Setra Omnibuses since 1951] (in German). Stuttgart: Motorbuch Verlag. ISBN 3613021919.
- ——————; Forberger, Petra (2003). Großes aus kleinen Anfängen: 100 Jahre Otto Kässbohrer [Big Things from Small Beginnings: 100 Years of Otto Kässbohrer] (in German). Ulm, Germany: DWM Verlag.
- Schindler, Manfred (1984). Otto Kässbohrer: His views and achievements in an era of change (2nd, expanded ed.). Ulm, Germany: Karl Kässbohrer Fahrzeugwerke. OCLC 499892642.
- Weber, Alexander (2014). Kässbohrer & Setra-Omnibusse [Kässbohrer & Setra Omnibuses] (in German). Vol. Band 1. [Volume 1.] Brilon, Germany: Podszun Verlag. ISBN 9783861337300.
- ———————— (2014). Kässbohrer & Setra-Omnibusse [Kässbohrer & Setra Omnibuses] (in German). Vol. Band 2. [Volume 2.] Brilon, Germany: Podszun Verlag. ISBN 9783861337317.
