= List of Mercedes-Benz trucks =

Trucks produced by Mercedes-Benz

Mercedes-Benz Truck textlogo black

Mercedes-Benz is a German automotive brand that was formed with the merger of Benz & Cie., the world's oldest car company, and Daimler Motoren Gesellschaft in 1926. It is part of the Mercedes-Benz Group AG, a German car manufacturing company. The following is a list of trucks produced by Mercedes-Benz.

== 1926–1944 ==
The first Mercedes-Benz truck range, presented at the 1926 Berlin Motor Show (October) and at the 1927 International Motor Show for Trucks and Special Vehicles in Cologne (May) included three basic models with the payloads of 1.5, 2.5 and 5 tons. Each model was available with a standard and a low-frame chassis. Low chassis made sense especially that time to make easier loading and unloading of the vehicle. Also the low chassis has been used to build the buses. The models with the standard chassis were L1, L2 and L5 (L stood for Lastwagen, German word for a truck, and the digit stood for the rated payload in tons). The models with the low chassis were N1, N2 and NJ5/N5 (N stood for Niederwagen, meaning low car). The trucks were equipped with the four-cylinder petrol engines (M14, M2 and M5), developing 45HP, 55HP and 70 HP. Mercedes-Benz L1 and L2 were the new models, but Mercedes-Benz L5 truck was basically a continuation of famous Benz 5CN truck, which was developed before the merge of Benz & Cie and Daimler-Motoren-Gesellschaft companies.

In 1927 Mercedes-Benz presented its first diesel engine (OM5), which immediately became a sensation. It was the world's first six-cylinder diesel engine, installed on the commercial vehicle. Also from 1927 Mercedes-Benz offered the more powerful six-cylinder petrol engines (M16, M26 and M36) developing 50HP, 70HP and 100 HP. Four-cylinder engines were discontinued only one year later. Therefore, in 1927–1928 most of the trucks from the series L1, L2, L5 were available with four- or six-cylinder engines. To distinguish that, six-cylinder versions of the trucks were referred sometimes as, for example, L1/6 or N2/6.

In 1927–1928 Mercedes-Benz also expanded the range of the truck models, adding the small model L3/4 with the payload of 750 kg (3/4 ton), which was developed from the passenger car Typ W02, and a heavy three-axis model N56 with a payload of 7–9 tons. The payloads of L1 and L2 models was increased with the new 6 cylinder engines from 1.5 to 1.75 tons (model L1/N1) and from 2.5 to 3.0–4.0 tons (model L2/N2). To fill the newly formed gap between L1 and L2 models, Mercedes-Benz offered new 2.5 tons model L45/N46 and (a bit later) 2.75/3.0 tons model L57/N58.

Resulting diversity of the trucks made an impressive lineup of Mercedes-Benz commercial vehicles, but also required a new, better system for their designations. In fact, by the year of 1930, only the model L5 still referred to its payload (5 tons). L1 model's payload has been gradually increased up to 2 tons, L2 model's payload – up to 4 tons, and L45/N46 and L57/N58 model names were not saying about their payload at all from the beginning, but were rather the company's internal model designations. So in October 1930 a new system for the commercial vehicle designation has been introduced. Basically, instead of the one digit, standing for the rated payload in tons, a four digits number, standing for the rated payload in kg, has now been used. This number followed the same letter L for the trucks (as before), or the letters Lo (LO) for the low chassis, or the letter O for the buses (O stood for the German word Omnibus, what is translated as a bus). According to that, the model L1 was renamed to L2000, model L45 was renamed to L2500, model L57 was renamed to L3000, model L2 was renamed to L4000, model L5 was renamed to L5000 and the model N56 was renamed to L8500. This nomenclature has been used for more than 20 years, until 1954.

=== L1, L2, and L5 (1926–1932) ===
==== 1st generation, 4-cylinder engines (1926–1929) ====
Years	Internal designations (BM)	Sales designations	Engine	Displacement	Max power	Truck weight	Payload
1926–1928	Typ 31; Typ 41	L1 (Lastwagen 1½ Tonnen); N1 (Niederwagen 1½ Tonnen)	M 14, 4-cyl	3680 cc	45 PS (33 kW)	2.0 t	1.5 t
1926–1927	Typ 33; Typ 43	L2 (Lastwagen 2½ Tonnen); N2 (Niederwagen 2½ Tonnen)	M 2, 4-cyl	5750 cc	55 PS (40 kW)	3.6–3.9 t	2.5 t
1926–1929	Typ 34	L5 (Lastwagen 5 Tonnen); NJ5 (Niederwagen 5 Tonnen)	M 5, 4-cyl	8143 cc	70 PS (51 kW)	5.4 t	5 t

==== 2nd generation, 6-cylinder engines (1927–1931) ====
Years	Internal designations (BM)	Sales designations	Engine	Displacement	Max power	Truck weight	Payload
1927–1930	Typ 32; Typ 42	L1 (Lastwagen 1½ Tonnen); N1 (Niederwagen 1½ Tonnen)	M 16, 6-cyl	3921 cc	50 PS (37 kW)	2.2–2.3 t	1.5–1.75 t
1928–1930	Typ 45; Typ 46	L45 (Lastwagen 2½ Tonnen); N46 (Niederwagen 2½ Tonnen)	M 16, 6-cyl	3921 cc	55 PS (40 kW)	2.7 t	2.5 t
1927–1929	Typ 33; Typ 43	L2 (Lastwagen 3½ Tonnen); N2 (Niederwagen 3 Tonnen)	M 26, 6-cyl	7069 cc	70 PS (51 kW)	4.0 t	3.0–4.0 t
1928–1931	Typ 36	L5 (Lastwagen 5 Tonnen); N5 (Niederwagen 5 Tonnen)	M 36, 6-cyl; M 26, 6-cyl; OM 5, 6-cyl	7793 cc 7069 cc 8573 cc	100 PS (74 kW); 70 PS (51 kW); 70 PS (51 kW)	5.9 t	5 t
1928–1930	Typ 39	N56 (Niederwagen 7 Tonnen)	M 36, 6-cyl; OM 5, 6-cyl	7793 cc 8573 cc	100 PS (74 kW); 70 PS (51 kW)	7.0 t; 7.2 t	7.0 t
1928–1930	Typ 39	N56 (Niederwagen 8½ Tonnen)	M 36, 6-cyl; OM 5, 6-cyl	7793 cc 8573 cc	100 PS (74 kW); 70 PS (51 kW)	7.0 t; 7.2 t	8.5 t

==== 3rd generation (1930–1932) ====
Years	Internal designations (BM)	Sales designations	Engine	Displacement	Max power	Truck weight	Payload
1930–1932	Typ L 32	L 2000	M 32, 6-cyl	3921 cc	55 PS (40 kW)	2.4 t	2.0 t
1930–1932	Typ L 45; Typ N 46; Typ N 55	L 2500 (1930–1931); Lo 2500 (1930–1931); Lo 2500 (1931–1932)	M 16, 6-cyl	3921 cc	60 PS (44 kW)	2.7 t	2.5 t
1930–1932	Typ L 57; Typ N 58	L 2750, L 3000, LZ 7000; Lo 3000	M 56, 6-cyl	4170 cc	70 PS (51 kW)	3.0 t	2.75 t; 3.0 t; 7.0 t; 3.0 t
1930–1932	Typ 53; Typ 50	L 4000 (L2); O 4000 (L2)	M 36, 6-cyl	7793 cc	100 PS (74 kW)	4.1 t	3.5–4.0 t
1930–1932	Typ L 35	L 5000	M 36, 6-cyl; OM 5S, 6-cyl	7793 cc; 8573 cc	110 PS (81 kW); 85 PS (63 kW)	5.9 t; 6.1 t	5 t
1930–1933		L 8500 (6×4)	M 36, 6-cyl; OM 5S, 6-cyl	7793 cc; 8573 cc	110 PS (81 kW); 85 PS (63 kW)	7.5 t; 7.7 t	8.5–9 t

=== L3/4 and L1000 Express (1927–1936) ===
Years	Internal designations (BM)	Sales designations	Engine	Displacement	Max power	Truck weight	Payload
1927–1928; 1928–1929; 1929–1930	W02; W11; W11	L 3/4; L 3/4; L 750	M 02, 6-cyl; M 11, 6-cyl; M 11, 6-cyl	1988 cc 2581 cc 2581 cc	38 PS (28 kW); 50 PS (37 kW); 50 PS (37 kW)		0.75 t; 0.75 t; 0.75 t
1929–1936	Typ 37	L 1000	M 11, 6-cyl	2581 cc	50 PS (37 kW)		1.0 t

=== Light trucks (1932–1941) ===
==== 1st generation (1932–1935) ====
Years	Internal designations (BM)	Sales designations	Engine	Number of cylinders	Displacement (cc)	Horsepower	Truck weight	Payload
1932–1935	Typ L 60	Lo 2000; Lo 2500	M 60; OM 59	4; 4	3770; 3770	55 HP; 55 HP	2.4 t; 2.6 t; 2.6 t; 2.7 t	2.0 t; 2.5 t
1932–1935	Typ L 59	Lo 2750; Lo 3000	M 66; OM 65	4; 4	4942; 4849	65 HP; 65 HP	3.0 t; 3.2 t	2.75 t; 3.0 t
1932–1935	Typ L 64	Lo 3500	M 68; OM 67	6; 6	7440; 7274	95 HP; 95 HP	3.7 t; 3.9 t	3.5 t; 3.75 t

==== 2nd generation (1935–1937) ====
Years	Internal designations (BM)	Sales designations	Engine	Displacement	Max power	Truck weight	Payload
1935–1937	Typ L 60	Lo 2000; Lo 2500	M 60, 4-cyl; OM 59, 4-cyl	3770 cc 3770 cc	55 PS (40 kW); 55 PS (40 kW)	2.4 t; 2.6 t; 2.6 t; 2.7 t	2.0 t; 2.5 t
1935–1937	Typ L 59	Lo 2750; Lo 3000; Lo 3100; Lo 3200	M 66/3, 4-cyl; OM 65/3, 4-cyl	4942 cc 4849 cc	70 PS (51 kW); 70 PS (51 kW)	3.0 t; 3.2 t	2.75 t; 3.0 t
1935–1937	Typ L 64	Lo 3750	M 68, 6-cyl; OM 67/3, 6-cyl	7413 cc 7274 cc	95 PS (70 kW); 100 PS (74 kW)	4.0 t; 4.2 t	3.75 t

==== 3rd generation (1937–1941) ====
Years	Internal designations (BM)	Sales designations	Engine	Displacement	Max power	Truck weight	Payload
1937–1940	Typ L 60	L 2000; L 2500	M 60/1, 4-cyl; OM 59/1, 4-cyl	4562 cc 4562 cc	60 PS (44 kW); 60 PS (44 kW)	2.5 t; 2.7 t; 2.5 t; 2.7 t	2.0 t; 2.5 t
1937–1940	Typ L 59	L 2750; L 3000	M 66/3, 4-cyl; OM 65/3, 4-cyl	4942 cc 4849 cc	70 PS (51 kW); 70 PS (51 kW)	2.8 t; 3.0 t	3.0 t
1937–1941	Typ L 64	L 3750; L 4000	M 68, 6-cyl; OM 67/3, 6-cyl	7413 cc 7274 cc	95 PS (70 kW); 100 PS (74 kW)	4.0 t; 4.2 t	3.75 t

=== Semitrailer tractors (1932–1938) ===
Mercedes-Benz semitrailer tractor family was developed from Mercedes-Benz Lo2000-Lo3750 trucks.

Years	Internal designations (BM)	Sales designations	Engine	Displacement	Max power	Truck weight	Payload
1934–1937	Typ L 60	LZ 4000	M 60, 4-cyl; OM 59, 4-cyl	3770 cc 3770 cc	55 PS (40 kW); 55 PS (40 kW)	2.4 t; 2.6 t	4 t
1932–1938	Typ L 59	LZ 6000	M 66, 4-cyl; OM 65, 4-cyl	4942 cc 4849 cc	65 PS (48 kW); 65 PS (48 kW)	2.8 t; 3.0 t	6 t
1932–1935; 1935–1938	Typ L 64	LZ 8000; LZ10000	OM 67, 6-cyl; OM 67/3, 6-cyl	7413 cc 7274 cc	95 PS (70 kW); 100 PS (74 kW)	3.4 t; 3.8 t	8 t; 10 t

=== L5000 (1932–1936) ===
Years	Internal designations (BM)	Sales designations	Engine	Number of cylinders	Displacement (cc)	Horsepower	Truck weight	Payload	Production figures
1932–1933	Typ L 35	L 5000	M 76; OM 77	6; 6	9450; 9450	110 HP; 110 HP	5.8 t	5 t	149
1934–1937	Typ L 35	L 5000	M 78; OM 79	6; 6	10280; 10280	120 HP; 120 HP	5.9 t	5 t	1095

=== Heavy-duty trucks (1934–1939) ===
Years	Internal designations (BM)	Sales designations	Engine	Number of cylinders	Displacement (cc)	Horsepower	Truck weight	Payload	Production figures
1935–1938; 1935–1939; 1938–1940	Typ L 54	L 6500 (4×2)	OM 79; OM 54; OM 57	6; 6; 6	10280; 12517; 11200	120 PS (88 kW); 150 PS (110 kW); 150 PS (110 kW)	6.5 t; 6.9 t; 7.0 t	5.2 t	2137
1932–1934	Typ N 56	L 8500 (6×4)	M 78; OM 79	6; 6	10280; 10280	120 PS (88 kW); 120 PS (88 kW)	7.5 t; 7.7 t	8.5 t	
1934–1936	Typ N 56	L 8500 (6×4)	OM 54	6	12517	150 PS (110 kW)	8.0 t	8.5 t	85
1935–1938 1938–1939	Typ N 56	L 10000 (6×4)	OM 54; OM 57	6; 6	12517; 11200	150 PS (110 kW); 150 PS (110 kW)	8.5 t; 8.6 t	10 t	

=== LG and LR (1934–1944) ===
LG means Lastwagen Geländewagen (off-road truck). LR means Lastwagen Raupenfahrzeug (caterpillar truck). The Mercedes-Benz LG65/2 and LG65/4 were experimental models.

Years	Internal designations (BM)	Sales designations	Engine	Displacement	Max power	Truck weight	Payload
1934–1935	Typ LG 65/2	LG 2000	OM 67, 6-cyl	7274 cc	95 PS (70 kW)		2.0–2.6 t
1936–1939	Typ LG 65/3	LG 2500 (6×6)	OM 67, 6-cyl	7274 cc	95 PS (70 kW)		2.3–2.5 t
1934–1935	Typ LG 65/4	LG 3000 (8×8)	OM 65, 4-cyl	4849 cc	65 PS (48 kW)		3.3–4.3 t
1935–1938	Typ LG 63	L 3000 (6×4)	OM 67, 6-cyl	7274 cc	95 PS (70 kW)	5.7 t	2.0–3.0 t
1937–1939	Typ LG 68	LG 4000	OM 67, 6-cyl	7274 cc	95 PS (70 kW)	6.6 t	2.7–3.7 t
1936–1939	Typ LR 75	LR 75	M 142, 6-cyl	3208 cc	65 PS (48 kW)	2.1 t	0.8 t
1943–1944	Typ LR 303	L 4500 R Maultier	OM 67/4, 6-cyl	7274 cc	112 PS (82 kW)	7.7 t	4.5 t

=== L1100, L1500, and L2000 (1936–1941) ===
The lighter L1100 family was first presented in 1936, but because of the Nazi government's Schell Plan Mercedes-Benz were forced to focus on heavier trucks; the lighter trucks were mainly built with petrol engines for the armed forces as civilians could no longer buy trucks.

Years	Internal designations (BM)	Sales designations	Engine	Displacement	Max power	Truck weight	Payload
1936–1941	Typ L 70	L 1100	OM 138, 4-cyl; M 143, 6-cyl	2545 cc; 2230 cc	45 PS (33 kW); 45 PS (33 kW)	1.6 t; 1.5 t	1.1 t
1937–1941	Typ L 70	L 1500	OM 138, 4-cyl; M 143, 6-cyl; M 159, 6-cyl	2545 cc; 2230 cc; 2594 cc	45 PS (33 kW); 45 PS (33 kW); 60 PS (44 kW)	1.6 t; 1.5 t; 1.5 t	1.5 t
1937–1940	Typ L 81	L 2000 L (light)	M 142, 4-cyl	3210 cc	65 PS (48 kW)	2.0 t	2.0 t

=== L1500, L3000, and L4500 (1939–1944) ===
Years	Internal designations (BM)	Sales designations	Engine	Displacement	Max power	Truck weight	Payload
1941–1944	Typ L 301	L 1500 A/S	M 159, 6-cyl	2594 cc	60 PS (44 kW)	2.2–2.5 t	1.4–1.7 t
1938–1939; 1939–1944	Typ L 66	LGF 3000; L 3000 A/S	OM 65/3, 4-cyl; OM 65/4, 4-cyl	4849 cc; 4849 cc	70 PS (51 kW); 70 PS (51 kW)	3.6 t; 4.0 t	2.6–3.1 t
1939–1944	Typ L 303	L 4500 A/S	OM 67/4, 6-cyl	7274 cc	112 PS (82 kW)	5.3 t	4.5 t

== 1945–1960 ==
The immediate post-war era was marked by rebuilding the trucking industry. In the mid-fifties, however, Germany's first federal transport minister Hans-Christoph Seebohm enacted a number of laws promoting the Bundesbahn at the expense of the trucking industry. Severe weight and dimension restrictions were particularly harmful to export-dependent Mercedes-Benz, as they had to develop duplicate truck lineups – one for export, and one for the restricted German market. These restrictions were eased beginning in 1960, leaving Mercedes-Benz free to focus their efforts on a unified lineup once again.

=== L4500 (1945–1961) ===
Years	Internal designations (BM)	Sales designations	Engine	Number of cylinders	Displacement (cc)	Horsepower	GVW	Payload
1945–1948	303	L 4500	OM 67/4	6	7270	112 HP	10.5 t	4.5 t
1948–1952	303	L 5000	OM 67/4	6	7270	112 HP	10.5 t	5.0 t
1952–1953	303	L 5500	OM 67/8	6	7270	120 HP	11 t	5.5 t
1953–1957	325	L 5500/ L 325	OM 325	6	7270	125 HP	11.3–12 t	5.9–6.6 t
1957–1961	330	L 330 (export)	OM 315	6	8280	125 HP	12–13 t	6.6–7.6 t

=== L3500/L4500 (1949–1961) ===
Years	Internal designations (BM)	Sales designations	Engine	Number of cylinders	Displacement (cc)	Horsepower	GVW	Payload
1949–1950	311	L 3250	OM 312	6	4580	90 HP	6.5 t	3.25 t
1950–1961	311	L/LP 3500 / L/LP 311	OM 312	6	4580	90–100 HP	6.7 t	3.5 t
1953–1961	312	L/LP 4500 / L/LP 312	OM 312	6	4580	90–100 HP	8.5 t	4.5 t
1957–1959	321	L/LP 321	OM 321	6	5100	110 HP	9.3 t	5.2–5.4 t

=== L6600 (1950–1962) ===
Years	Internal designations (BM)	Sales designations	Engine	Number of cylinders	Displacement (cc)	Horsepower	GVW	Payload
1950–1958	304	L 6600 / L/LP 315	OM 315	6	8280	145 HP	12.6 t	6.6 t
1957–1958	326	L/LP 326	OM 326	6	10810	192–200 HP	16 t	8.6 t
1956–1957; 1957–1962	329	L/LP 329	OM 315; OM 326	6; 6	8280; 10810	145 HP; 172 HP	12 t	6.5 t
1957–1959	331	L/LP 331 (export)	OM 326	6	10810	150–172 HP	15 t	8 t
1958–1962	332	L/LP 332 (export)	OM 326	6	10810	172 HP	17.5 t	11 t
1958–1962	334	L/LP 334 (export)	OM 326	6	10810	192–200 HP	19 t	12 t

The nomenclature: In 1954 the old four-digit model series designation (indicated the payload in kilograms), was replaced by a three-digit model series designation, which basically corresponded to Mercedes-Benz internal model designations (in-house design codes). This nomenclature have been used for almost 10 years, from 1954 till 1963.

A cab-over-engine versions of most of the trucks were also available from 1954. For example, LP4500 (1954) and LP315 (1955). However, there was only a single model which existed only as a cab-over-engine version, "the Millipede" (LP 333).

Years	Internal designations (BM)	Sales designations	Engine	Number of cylinders	Displacement (cc)	Horsepower	GVW	Payload
1958–1961	333	LP 333	OM 326	6	10810	200 HP	16 t; 20 t; 22.5 t	9.2 t; 12.5 t; 14.7 t

== 1960s ==
=== Kurzhauber (1959–1988) ===
Cab-over-engine versions (LP) of most of the trucks were also available; the cabins were built by Wackenhut until the introduction of the "cubic" cab LP-series.

==== 1st generation (OM312, OM321, OM322 engines), 1959–1963 ====
Years	Internal designations (BM)	Sales designations	Engine	Number of cylinders	Displacement (cc)	Horsepower	GVW	Payload
1961–1963	323	L/LP 323	OM 312	6	4580	100 HP	7.5 t	4 t
1961–1962; 1962–1963	328	L/LP 328	OM 312; OM 321	6; 6	4580; 5104	100 HP; 110 HP	9 t	5 t
1959–1962; 1962–1963	322	L/LP 322	OM 321; OM 322	6; 6	5104; 5675	110 HP; 126 HP	10.5t	6.5 t
1959–1962; 1962–1963	327	L/LP 327	OM 321; OM 322	6; 6	5104; 5675	110 HP; 126 HP	12 t; 14 t	7.5 t; 9 t

==== 2nd generation (OM352 engine), 1963–1970 ====
Years	Internal designations (BM)	Sales designations	Engine	Number of cylinders	Displacement (cc)	Horsepower	GVW	Payload
1963–1970	323	L/LP 710	OM 352	6	5675	100 HP	7.5 t	4 t
1963–1969	328	L/LP 911	OM 352	6	5675	110 HP	9 t	5 t
1963–1969	322	L/LP 1113	OM 352	6	5675	126 HP	10.5t	6.5 t
1963–1969	327	L/LP 1413	OM 352	6	5675	126 HP	14 t	9 t

The nomenclature: In 1963 a new designation system was introduced: a three- or four-digit number where the first one or two digits indicate the rounded GVW in tones, and the last two figures indicate the engine power to tens of horsepower. This index system remains in use until now.

==== 3rd generation (OM352 and OM 360 engines), 1967–1988 ====
LP versions – see below.

Years	Internal designations (BM)	Sales designations	Engine	Number of cylinders	Displacement (cc)	Horsepower	GVW	Payload
1968–1988	353	L 911 B	OM 352	6	5675	110 HP	9 t	5 t
1968–1988	358	L 1113 B	OM 352	6	5675	130 HP	11 t	7 t
1967–1984; 1969–1977	352	L 1313; L 1813 (6×4)	OM 352	6	5675	130 HP	13 t; 18 t	8.5 t; ?
1971–1976	360	L 1513; L 1517; L 1519; L 1817 (6×4); L 1819 (6×4)	OM 352; OM 360; OM 360; OM 360; OM 360	6; 6; 6; 6; 6	5675; 8720; 8720; 8720; 8720	130 HP; 170 HP; 192 HP; 170 HP; 170 HP	14.8 t; 14.8 t; 14.8 t; 18 t; 18 t	9.5 t; 9.5 t; 9.5 t; ?; ?

=== Kurzhauber with longer hood (1959–1988) ===
The cab-over-engine versions (LP) of most of the trucks were also available.

==== 1st generation (OM326 engine), 1959–1963 ====
Years	Internal designations (BM)	Sales designations	Engine	Number of cylinders	Displacement (cc)	Horsepower	GVW	Payload
1959–1960	337	L/LP 337	OM 326	6	10810	172 HP	12 t	7 t
1960–1963	338	L/LP 338	OM 326	6	10810	180 HP	13.5 t	8 t
1962–1963	339	LA 329 B	OM 326	6	10810	180 HP	14.8t	
1962–1962	348	L 332 B	OM 326	6	10810	180 HP	19 t	11.5 t
1963–1963	349	L 332 C	OM 326	6	10810	180 HP	19 t	11.5 t
1963–1963	349	L 331 B	OM 326	6	10810	180 HP	16.5 t	9 t
1960–1963	335	L/LP 334 B	OM 326	6	10810	192–200 HP	16 t	9 t
1962–1963	336	L/LP 334 C	OM 326	6	10810	192–200 HP	19 t	12 t

==== 2nd generation (OM346 engine), 1963–1970 ====
Years	Internal designations (BM)	Sales designations	Engine	Number of cylinders	Displacement (cc)	Horsepower	GVW	Payload
1963–1968	338	L/LP 1418	OM 346	6	10810	180 HP	14 t	8 t
1963–1968	339	LA 1518 (LA 329 B)	OM 346	6	10810	180 HP	14.8 t	
1963–1970	349	L 1618 (L 331 B)	OM 346	6	10810	180 HP	16.5 t	9 t
1963–1969	349	L 1918 (L 332 C)	OM 346	6	10810	180 HP	19 t	11.5 t
1963–1967	335	L/LP 1620 (L/LP 334 B)	OM 346	6	10810	210 HP	16 t	9 t
1963–1970	336	L/LP 1920 (L/LP 334 C)	OM 346	6	10810	210 HP	19 t	12 t
1964–1968	343	L 2220 (6×4); L 2620 (6×4)	OM 346; OM 346	6; 6	10810; 10810	210 HP; 210 HP	22 t; 26 t	11 t; 15 t

==== 3rd generation (OM355 engine), 1967–1988 ====
LP versions – see below.

Years	Internal designations (BM)	Sales designations	Engine	Number of cylinders	Displacement (cc)	Horsepower	GVW	Payload
1967–1970	335	L 1623	OM 355	6	11580	230 HP	16 t	8.5 t
1967–1970	336	L 1923	OM 355	6	11580	230 HP	19 t	11.5 t
1969–1975; 1969–1982; 1981–1988; 1978–1988	346	L 1624; L 1924; LS1924 (export); LS1928(export); LS1929/LS1932/LS1933/LS1934(Brazil)	OM 355	6	11580	240 HP; 240 HP; 240 HP; 280 HP; 320 HP; 330 HP; 340 HP	16 t; 19 t; 19 t; 19 t	8.5 t; 11.5 t; 11 t; 11 t
1967–1969; 1969–1983	343	L 2623; L 2624	OM 355	6	11580	230 HP; 240 HP	26 t	15 t
1969–1979; 1969–1979	349	L 1621; L 1921	OM 355	6	11580	210 HP; 210 HP	16.5 t; 19 t	9 t; 11.5 t

- Mercedes-Benz LP-series (cubic)

=== Light range trucks (1965–1984) ===
Years	Internal designations (BM)	Sales designations	Engine	Number of cylinders	Displacement (cc)	Horsepower	GVW	Payload
1965–1977; 1977–1983	314	LP 608; LP 709	OM 314	4	3780	80–85 PS; 80–85 PS	5.99 t; 6.5 t	3 t; 3.5 t
1967–1977; 1977–1983	316	LP 808; LP 809	OM 314	4	3780	80–85 PS; 80–85 PS	7.5 t; 8 t	4.5 t; 5 t
1970–1973; 1973–1984; 1975–1984; 1976–1984; 1979–1984	318	LP 811; LP 813; LP 913; LP 1013; LP 1113	OM 352	6	5375	110 HP; 130 HP; 130 HP; 130 HP; 130 HP	8 t; 8 t; 9 t; 10 t; 11 t	4–4.5 t; 4–4.5 t; 5–5.5 t; 6.5 t; 7.5 t

=== Medium range trucks (1965–1976) ===
Years	Internal designations (BM)	Sales designations	Engine	Number of cylinders	Displacement (cc)	Horsepower	GVW	Payload	Production figures
1965–1968; 1968–1976	353	LP 810; LP 911 B	OM 352; OM 352	6; 6	5675; 5675	100 HP; 110 HP	8 t; 9 t	4 t; 5 t	
1965–1968; 1968–1976	358	LP 1013; LP 1113 B	OM 352; OM 352	6; 6	5675; 5675	126 HP; 130 HP	10.5 t; 11 t	6 t; 7 t	
1965–1967; 1966–1967; 1967–1976; 1967–1971; 1970–1976	352	LP 1213; LP 1216; LP 1313; LP 1317; LP 1319	OM 352; OM 327; OM 352; OM 327; OM 360	6; 6; 6; 6; 6	5675; 7980; 5675; 7980; 8720	126 HP; 160 HP; 130 HP; 170 HP; 192 HP	12 t; 12.5 t; 13 t; 13 t; 13 t	7.5 t; 8 t; 8 t; 8 t; 8 t	
1965–1976; 1972–1976	354	LP 1418; LP 1424	OM 346; OM 355	6; 6	10810; 11580	185 HP; 240 HP	14.5 t; 14.8 t	8 t; 8 t	6445; 1557
1967–1976; 1967–1971; 1970–1976	360	LP 1513; LP 1517; LP 1519	OM 352; OM 327; OM 360	6; 6; 6	5675; 7980; 8720	130 HP; 170 HP; 192 HP	14.8 t; 14.8 t; 14.8 t	9.5 t; 9.5 t; 9.5 t	

=== Heavy range trucks (1963–1977) ===
Years	Internal designations (BM)	Sales designations	Engine	Number of cylinders	Displacement (cc)	Horsepower	GVW	Payload	Production figures
1963–1967; 1967–1969; 1969–1974	335	LP 1620; LP 1623; LP 1624	OM 346; OM 355; OM 355	6; 6; 6	10810; 11580; 11580	210 HP; 230 HP; 240 HP	16 t; 16 t; 16 t	9 t; 9 t; 9 t	
1963–1967; 1967–1969; 1969–1974	336	LP 1920; LP 1923; LP 1924	OM 346; OM 355; OM 355	6; 6; 6	10810; 11580; 11580	210 HP; 230 HP; 240 HP	19 t; 19 t; 19 t	12 t; 12 t; 12 t	
1970–1971; 1971–1976; 1972–1977	355	LP 1617; LP 1619 B; LP 2219 (6×4)	OM 360; OM 360; OM 360	6; 6; 6	8720; 8720; 8720	170 HP; 192 HP; 192 HP	16 t; 16 t; 22 t	10 t; 10 t; ?	29; .; .
1970–1974; 1970–1974; 1972–1974; 1971–1974; 1971–1975	363	LP 1626; LP 1632; LP 1926; LP 1932; LPS 2032 (6×2)	OM 402; OM 403; OM 403; OM 403; OM 403	8; 10; 10; 10; 10	12760; 15950; 15950; 15950; 15950	256 HP; 320 HP; 320 HP; 320 HP; 320 HP	16 t; 16 t; 19 t; 20 t; 20 t	8 t; 8 t; ?; ?; ?	
1966–1967; 1967–1969; 1969–1974	366	LPS 2020 (6×2); LPS 2023 (6×2); LPS 2024 (6×2)	OM 346; OM 355; OM 355	6; 6; 6	10810; 11850; 11850	210 HP; 230 HP; 240 HP	20 t; 20 t; 20 t		
1968–1970	370	LP 1619	OM 360	6	10810	192 HP	16 t	9 t	241
1967–1970; 1969–1974	355; 355	LP 2223 (6×2); LP 2224 (6×2)	OM 355; OM 355	6; 6	11850; 11850	230 HP; 240 HP	22 t; 22 t	13 t; 13 t	
1967–1970; 1969–1974	361; 361	LP 2223 (6×4); LP 2224 (6×4)	OM 355; OM 355	6; 6	11850; 11850	230 HP; 240 HP	22 t; 22 t	13 t; 13 t	
1972–1974; 1971–1974	363; 363	LP 2226 (6×2, 6×4); LP 2232 (6×2, 6×4)	OM 402; OM 403	8; 10	12760; 15950	256 HP; 320 HP	22 t; 22 t	12.5 t; 12.5 t	

== 1970–1980s ==
=== New Generation (1974–1988) ===
==== 1st generation (NG74) ====
Years	Internal designations (BM)	Sales designations	Engine	Horsepower	GVW	Production figures
1974–1984	380	1013; 1013A; 1017; 1017L; 1017A; 1019; 1019A	OM 352, OM 401	130–190 HP	10 t	5977; 258; 8176; 209; 11179; 75; 792
1974–1984	381	1213; 1213A; 1216; 1217; 1217L; 1217A; 1219; 1219A	OM 352, OM 401	130–190 HP	12 t	17496; 545; 4; 15697; 2142; 983; 2292; 280
1974–1984	383	1413; 1413A; 1417; 1417A; 917; 1419; 1419L; 1419A; 1424; 1424A	OM 352, OM 401, OM 402	130–240 HP	14 t	5501; 191; 6230; 564; 1708; 9859; 1572; 268; 1332; 243
1974–1984	385	1613; 1613L; 1617; 1617L; 1617A; 1619; 1619L; 1619A; 1624; 1624L	OM 352, OM 401, OM 402	130–240 HP	16 t, 22 t	2883; 186; 14642; 723; 1777; 16832; 1206; 3235; 4709; 921
1974–1984	387	1626; 1626L; 1626A; 1632; 1632L; 1632A; 1719; 1719A	OM 401, OM 402	260–320 HP	16 t, 17 t	11507; 1180; 1693; 19882; 1833; 1838; 1253; 1584
1974–1984	389	1919; 1919A; 1926; 1926L; 1926A; 1932; 1932L; 1932A	OM 401, OM 402	190–320 HP	19 t	6435; 240; 16216; 95; 892; 8650; 95; 682
1974–1984	391	2024 6x4; 2026 6x2-4; 2032 6x2-4; 2032L 6x2-4	OM 402, OM 403	260–320 HP	20 t	1; 482; 1397; 495
1974–1984	393	2226 6x2; 2226L 6x2; 2226 6x4; 2226L 6x4; 2232 6x2; 2232L 6x2; 2232 6x4; 2232L 6x4	OM 402, OM 403	260–320 HP	22 t	2363; 758; 998; 14; 3770; 1313; 4684; 70
1974–1984	395	2626 6x4; 2626 6x6; 2632 6x4; 2632A 6x6	OM 402, OM 403	260–320 HP	26 t	19776; 7254; 14463; 8100

==== 2nd and 3rd generations (NG80, 1980–1985 and NG85, 1985–1988) ====
Years	Internal designations (BM)	Sales designations	Engine	Horsepower	GVW
1980–1988	615	1214, 1217, 1220, 1222, 1225	OM 362, OM 366, OM 421; OM 442	140–250 HP	12 t
1980–1988	616	1414, 1417, 1419, 1420, 1422, 1425	OM 362, OM 366 OM 421; OM 442	140–250 HP	14 t
1980–1988	617	1614, 1617, 1619, 1620, 1622, 1625	OM 362, OM 366, OM 421; OM 442	140–250 HP	16 t
1980–1988	619	2219, 2220, 2222, 2225	OM 362, OM 366, OM 421; OM 442	190–250 HP	22 t
1980–1988	620	1628, 1633, 1635, 1636, 1638, 1644	OM 421, OM 422, OM 423; OM 441, OM 442, OM 443	280–440 HP	16 t
1980–1988	621	1922, 1928, 1933, 1936, 1938	OM 421, OM 422, OM 423; OM 441, OM 442, OM 443	220–380 HP	19 t
1980–1988	622	2028 LS, 2033 LS, 2036 LS	OM 422	280–360 HP	20 t
1980–1988	623	2228, 2233, 2236, 2238, 2628, 2636; 2638, 3028, 3033, 3036, 3038, 3333	OM 422	280–330 HP	22 t, 26 t, 30 t, 33 t
1980–1988	624	2628, 2633, 2636, 2638, 3328, 3333; 3336	OM 422	280–360 HP	26 t, 33 t
1980–1988	625	3850	OM 423	500 HP	38 t

== 1990s ==
- Mercedes-Benz SK (Schwere Klasse)
- Mercedes-Benz MB700 (coe)
- Mercedes-Benz MB800 (Built by Mercedes-Benz Türk since 1996, this five-ton cab-over truck uses an Indonesian cabin, a Brazilian engine, and a Spanish transmission)

== 2000s ==
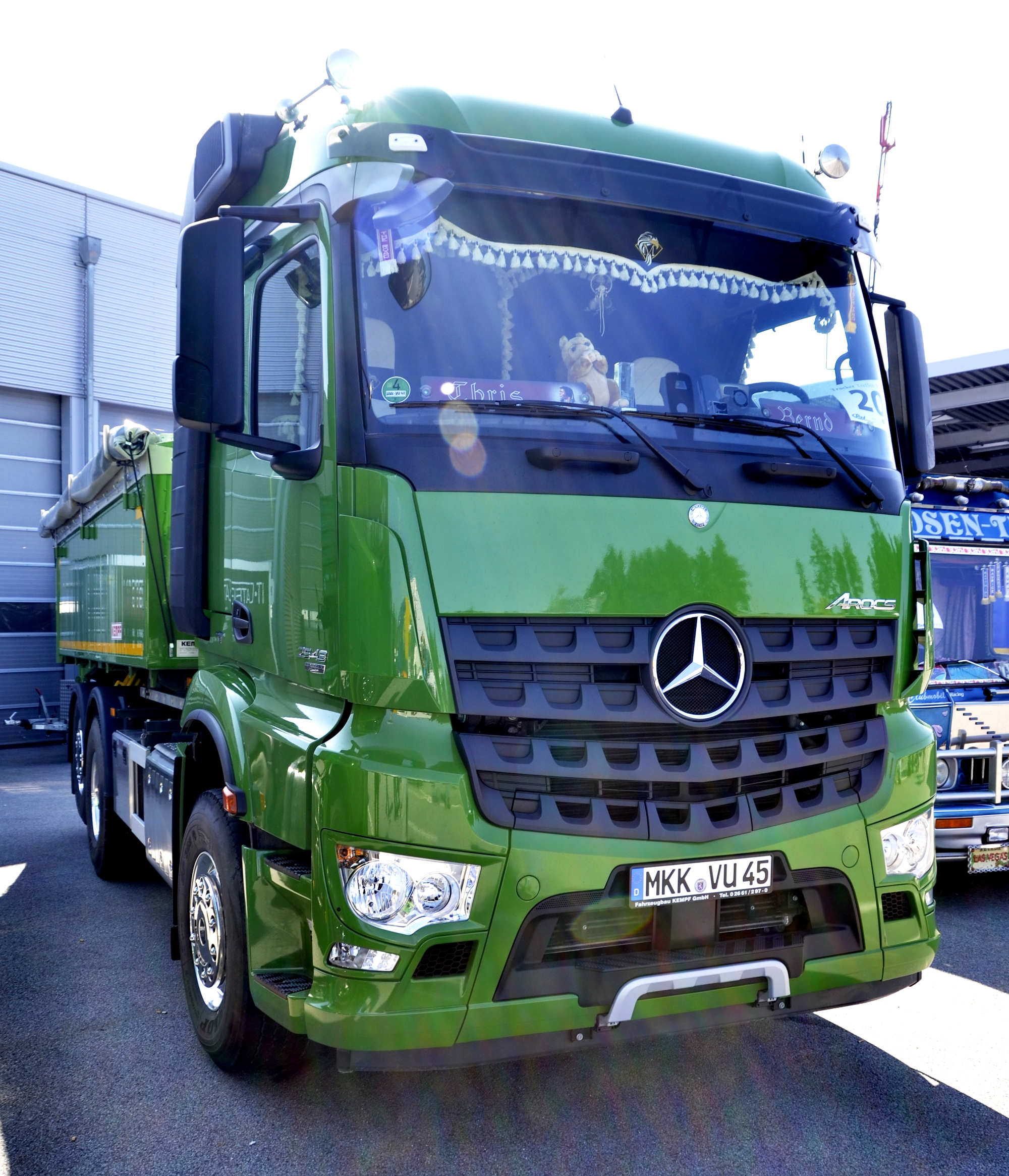
Mercedes-Benz Arocs 6×6

- Mercedes-Benz Atego – light truck from 7 to 16 tonnes
- Mercedes-Benz Axor – mid-sized truck from 18 to 26 tonnes in rigid and articulated
- Mercedes-Benz Actros – heavy duty rigid and premium articulated — 18 to 25 tonnes
- Mercedes-Benz Atron
- Mercedes-Benz Econic – low floor version of the Axor for refuse and specialist applications
- Mercedes-Benz Unimog – for special purpose applications and transport across extreme terrain
- Mercedes-Benz Zetros – off-road truck for extreme operations
- 1828L (F581) Mobile Casualty Treatment Centre
- 1517L Mobile Casualty Treatment Centre
- Mercedes-Benz Arocs
- Mercedes-Benz Antos

2013

Years	Internal designations (BM)	Internal series code	Sales designations	Engine
	900		310 CDI, 510 CDI	M651 D22
1995–2006	901	T1N	Sprinter 2...	M 111, OM 601, OM 602, OM 611
1995–2006	902	T1N	Sprinter 2...	M 111, OM 601, OM 602, OM 611, OM 612
1995–2006	903	T1N	Sprinter 3...	M 111, OM 601, OM 602, OM 611, OM 612
1995–2006	904	T1N	Sprinter 4...	M 111, OM 601, OM 602, OM 611, OM 612
1995–2006	905	T1N	Sprinter 6...	OM 612
2007–present	906	NCV3	Sprinter II	M 271, M 272, OM 642, OM 646, OM 651
2013–present	909	T1N	Sprinter (Russland)	OM 646
2002–2011	930	SKN	Actros "MP2, MP3", rigid	OM 501, OM 502
2002–2011	932	SKN	Actros "MP2, MP3", dumper (K)	OM 501, OM 502
2002–2011	933	SKN	Actros "MP2, MP3", concrete mixer (B)	OM 501, OM 502
2002–2011	934	SKN	Actros "MP2, MP3", tractor (S, LS)	OM 501, OM 502
2001–2013	940	SKN-C SKN-R	Axor, rigid	OM 457
2001–2013	942	SKN-C SKN-R	Axor, dumper (K)	OM 457
2001–2013	943	SKN-C SKN-R	Axor, concrete mixer (B)	OM 457
2001–2013	944	SKN-C SKN-R	Axor, tractor (S, LS)	OM 457
2009–present	949		Zetros	OM 926
1996–2002	950	SKN; SKN-R; SKN-C	Actros, rigid; Atego, rigid; Axor, rigid	OM 501, OM 502, OM 906, OM 926
1996–2002	952	SKN; SKN-R; SKN-C	Actros, dumper (K); Atego, dumper (K); Axor, dumper (K)	OM 501, OM 502, OM 906, OM 926
1996–2002	953	SKN; SKN-R; SKN-C	Actros, concrete mixer (B); Atego, concrete mixer (B); Axor, concrete mixer (B)	OM 501, OM 502, OM 906, OM 926
1996–2002	954	SKN; SKN-R; SKN-C	Actros, tractor (S, LS); Atego, tractor (S, LS); Axor, tractor (S, LS)	OM 501, OM 502, OM 906, OM 926
2013–present	956		Econic (II)	OM 936
1998–2013	957		Econic	OM 906, OM 926
	958		Atego, Axor (Brazil)	OM 457, OM 904, OM 924
2011–present	963	SFTP	Actros ("new"), Antos	OM 470, OM 471, OM 473, OM 936
2012–present	964		Arocs	OM 470, OM 471, OM 473, OM 936
2013–present	967		Atego	OM 934, OM 936
1998–2013	970	LKN	Atego, rigid	OM 904, OM 906, OM 924, OM 926
1998–2013	972	LKN	Atego, dumper (K)	OM 904, OM 906, OM 924, OM 926
1998–2013	974	LKN	Atego, tractor (S, LS)	OM 906, OM 924
1998–2013	975	LKN	Atego, for municipal purposes (KO)	OM 904, OM 906, OM 924, OM 926
1998–2013	976	LKN	Atego, fire truck (F, AF)	OM 904, OM 906, OM 924, OM 926
2003–present	979		Accelo (Brazil)	OM 364, OM 612, OM 924, OM 924

Mercedes-Benz internal model designations (in-house design codes) were always more or less just consecutively allocated design codes devoid of any deeper meaning. For the passenger cars they are so-called W-numbers, from German word Wagen (=car). For example, W202 is C-class, W220 is S-class etc. This system started in 1926 and the numbers are consecutive continued till now. From the 1970s letter W is used for saloons, while the other letters have been add for the different body types (f.e. W212 is E-class saloon, V212 is E-class limousine, S212 is E-class estate etc.). For the commercial vehicles for early decades letter L was used instead of letter W (German word Lastwagen means a truck). From the 1950s letter L was omitted, resulting in just 3 numbers code. Sometimes word Baumuster (model) or Baureihe (model line) was used, like Baumuster 352 (or in short BM352) or Baureihe 352 (in short BR.352). So, basically, with or without a letter(s) in front, there is unique 3-number code, which determine every Mercedes-Benz car. As for the trucks, 300-i.e. numbers were used till the 1980s to code Mercedes commercial vehicles, 600-i.e. numbers were used in the 1980s and 1990s, and 900-i.e. numbers have been used from the introduction of Sprinter (1995) and Actros (1996).

In 2011 the internal model designations system was a little bit reorganized:

1. Division.
  - 9: Commercial vehicle
2. Generation
  - 6: Actros/Antos/Arocs/Atego
  - 56: Econic
  - 11: Accelo
3. Project
  - 3: Actros/Antos On-road
  - 4: Arocs Off-road
  - 7: Atego
4. Kind of vehicle
  - 0: Rigid
  - 2: Dumper
  - 3: Concrete mixer
  - Tractor
5. Axle configuration/tonnage/rear suspension

For example: 963403 means Commercial Actros/Antos concrete mixer On-road vehicle, 4×2 18t

== Timeline ==
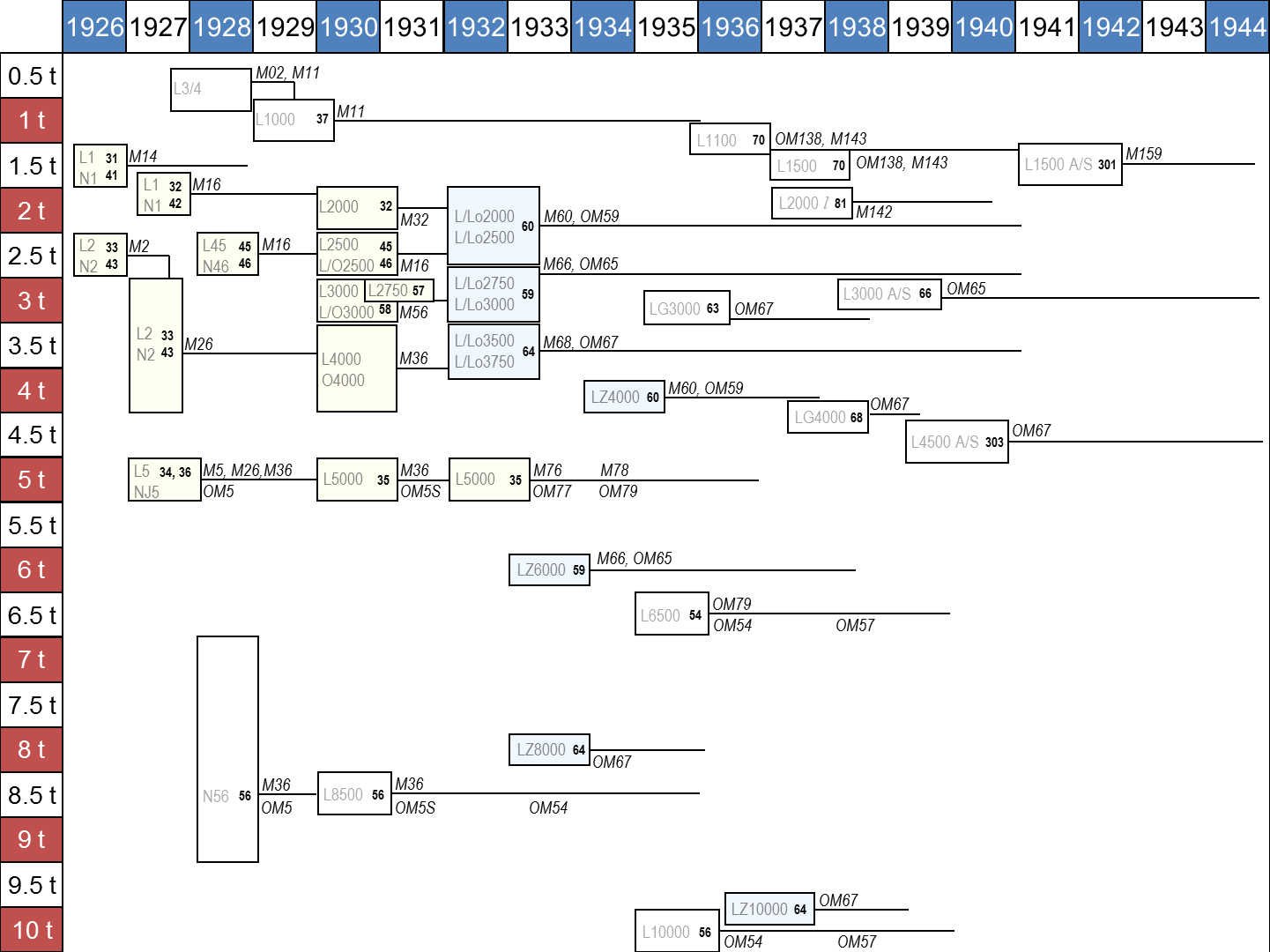
The chart of Mercedes-Benz truck models (including the internal designations), 1926–1944. Horizontally: years of production Vertically: payload in tons (approximately) Yellow boxes: L1/L2/L5 family, Light-blue boxes: Lo2000 family, White boxes: the rest.
