= Daimler Truck =

German commercial vehicle manufacturer

Daimler Truck Holding AG

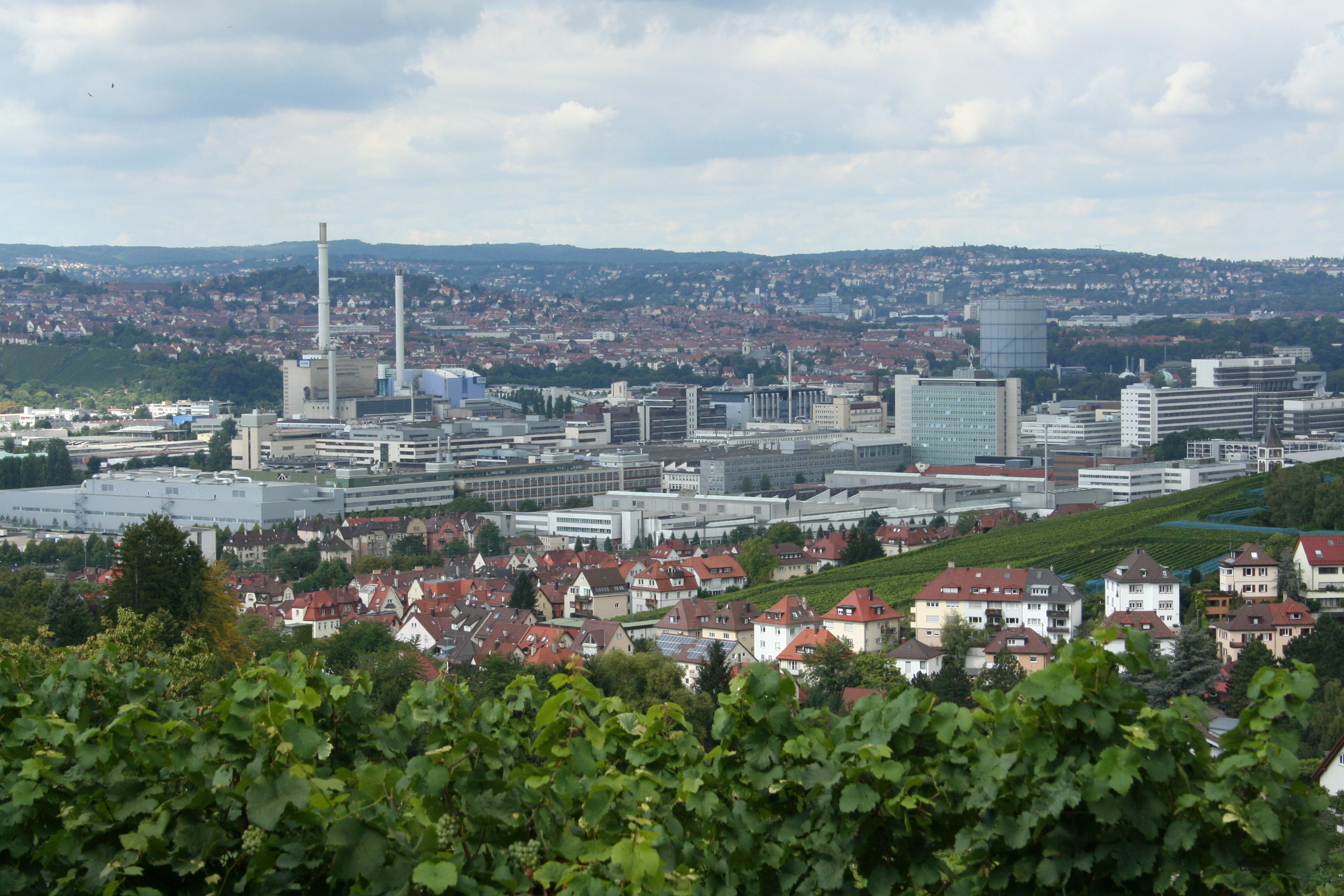
- Daimler Truck AG facilities
- Type: Public
- Traded as: FWB: DTG; DAX component
- ISIN: DE000DTR0CK8
- Industry: Automotive
- Predecessor: Daimler AG's heavy commercial vehicle operations
- Founded: 1 November 2019; 7 years ago Stuttgart, Germany
- Headquarters: Leinfelden-Echterdingen, Germany
- Area served: Worldwide
- Key people: Joe Kaeser (Chairman); Karin Rådström (CEO)
- Products: Trucks; Buses
- Services: Financial
- Revenue: 55,890,000,000 euro (2023)
- Operating income: 5,184,000,000 euro (2023)
- Net income: 3,775,000,000 euro (2023)
- Total assets: 71,212,000,000 euro (2023)
- Owners: Mercedes-Benz Group (30.01%); BAIC (6.49%); Kuwait Investment Authority (5.01%); Mercedes-Benz Pension Trust (4.99%)
- Number of employees: 104,416 (2023)
- Subsidiaries: Daimler Truck North America; Daimler India
- Website: daimlertruck.com

Daimler Truck AG (holding company legal name Daimler Truck Holding AG) is the world's largest commercial vehicle manufacturer, with over 35 main locations worldwide and approximately 100,000 employees. Daimler Truck AG is headquartered in Leinfelden-Echterdingen, Germany. It was a part of Daimler AG from November 2019 to December 2021.

== History ==
The history of Daimler Truck and Mercedes-Benz Trucks (List of Mercedes-Benz trucks) and Mercedes-Benz buses began in the 1890s when the gasoline engines of Carl Benz & Cie and Daimler Motoren Gesellschaft were also used in commercial vehicles. In 1896, Daimler sold the world’s very first motor truck (Order No. 81) to the British Motor Syndicate in London, and a Benz delivery truck (Lieferungswagen) was sold to Paris. DMG soon used Mercedes as its brand as it had sold Daimler licences and Naming rights to France (Panhard & Levassor), Britain (Daimler Company), Austria-Hungary (Austro-Daimler) and other countries. Benz and Daimler merged in 1926 to Daimler-Benz, selling Mercedes-Benz trucks, also with Diesel engines. While the Germany-based factories (Mannheim, Gaggenau, etc.) produced for Europe, Africa and Middle East, while Mercedes-Benz Argentina started in 1951 with a plant in Virrey del Pino.

The Daimler Truck and Daimler Buses divisions include the eight vehicle brands BharatBenz, Freightliner, FUSO, Mercedes-Benz, RIZON, Setra, Thomas Built Buses and Western Star. Daimler Truck is the global market leader in the medium and heavy-duty truck segment with a gross vehicle weight of over 6 tons. In 2019, around 489,000 vehicles were delivered in this segment. Financial and mobility services are offered via the Daimler Truck Financial Services division.

Daimler Truck was established in 2019 as a subsidiary of Daimler AG. In February 2021, Daimler announced its planned to spin off Daimler Truck into a separate listed company. The spin-off was approved by its shareholders on 1 October 2021. Following this, Daimler Truck Holding AG was incorporated to manage assets owned by Daimler Truck AG, and Daimler AG retained 35% of shares in the new company, with 5% being transferred to its pension trust. A separate website for the Daimler Truck company was launched on December 1, and the company went public on 10 December.

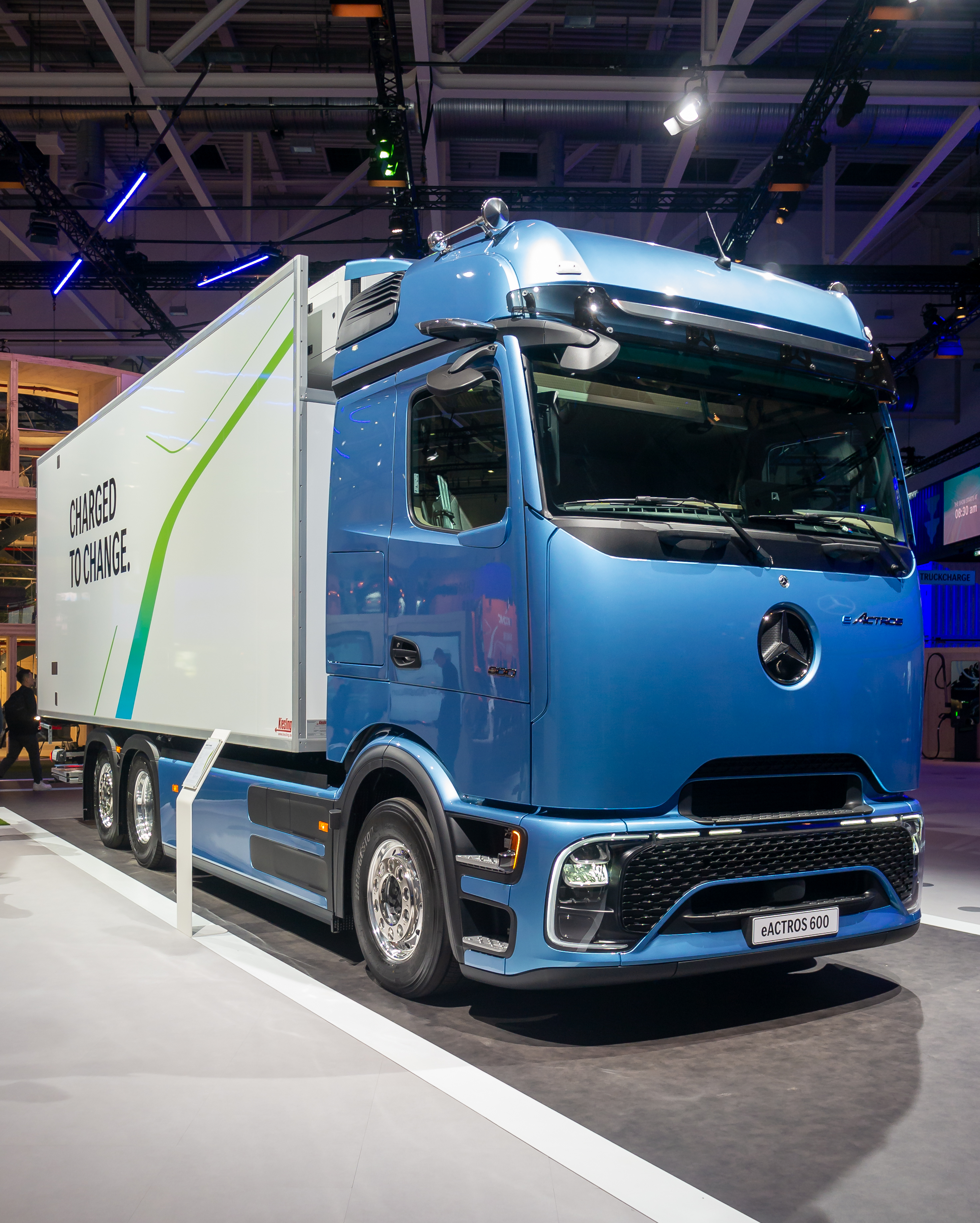
Mercedes-Benz eActros 600, Daimler's current flagship BEV truck for the European market

On June 2 2025, Archion was established in Japan, and became operational on April 1 2026 to align with the Japanese fiscal year. Daimler Truck and Toyota, respectively the parent companies of Fuso and Hino, each own 25% of Archion.

On July 1, 2025, it became known that Daimler Truck was placed on Russia's sanctions list due to alleged deliveries to Ukraine.

== Brands ==
- Mercedes-Benz - light, medium and heavy trucks, buses (brand in Germany)
- Freightliner - medium and heavy trucks, vans
- Western Star - heavy trucks
- Thomas Built Buses - school buses
- Setra - buses
- BharatBenz - medium and heavy trucks, buses (brand in India)
- Detroit Diesel - medium and heavy-duty powertrain (brand in United States)
- TruckStore - used vehicles, financing, leasing, rental, warranty and service contracts, and buyback
- Fleetboard - telematics and connectivity

== Finances ==
Of the Daimler Group's total workforce of 298,683 at the end of 2018 (2017: 289,321), 82,953 (2016: 79,483) worked at the Daimler Trucks division, of which 30,447 (2017: 30,424) were employed in Germany and 16,647 in the U.S. (2017: 15,002). In 2019, revenue amounted to €40.2 billion at Daimler Trucks and €4.7 billion at Daimler Buses. Daimler Buses is a leading brand in its core markets of Europe, Mexico, Brazil, and Argentina, selling 30,888 vehicles worldwide in 2019.

In 2018, the most important sales market was the NAFTA countries with 37% followed by Asia with 32%, Western Europe (EU plus Norway and Switzerland) with 17%, and Latin America (excluding the NAFTA country of Mexico) with 7%.

== Lobbying on Climate Regulations ==
Daimler Truck's subsidiary, Daimler Truck North America (DTNA), has actively lobbied the US government and to weaken climate regulations governing heavy-duty trucks. In the US, DTNA supported the second Trump administration's repeal of the 2009 Endangerment Finding in 2025, resulting in the repeal of all greenhouse gas emissions regulation for heavy-duty trucks, in addition to the regulation of greenhouse gas emissions across the entire American economy. Earlier in 2025, DTNA Vice President of Product Integrity Sean Waters testified before the EPA and supported the EPA's proposed decision to cease regulation of greenhouse gases, stating that "We support EPA efforts in these proceedings to restore the best reading of the Clean Air Act." In August 2025, DTNA filed a lawsuit against California regulators to overturn the Clean Trucks Partnership, an agreement the company had voluntarily reached with regulators approximately two years prior, in which the DTNA agreed to increase its sales of zero-emission trucks in the state even if California's regulatory authority was repealed by the federal government.

== Locations ==
Daimler Truck has a worldwide network of production plants and research centres. The following list is a description of all locations worldwide that include a Daimler Truck plant, including plants for the subsidiaries EvoBus, Daimler Trucks North America, Detroit Diesel, Freightliner Trucks, and Mitsubishi Fuso Truck and Bus Corporation.

| City | Country | Purpose | Employees (Note: As of December 2013) | Plant area |
|---|---|---|---|---|
| Aikawa | Japan | Production of transmission parts | 267 | —N/a |
| Aksaray | Turkey | Atego, Axor, Actros & Unimog; Research and development | 1,737 | 560,000 m^{2} (6,000,000 sq ft) |
| Atlantis | South Africa | Foundry | 842 | 940,000 m^{2} (10,100,000 sq ft) |
| Beijing | China | Auman trucks (assembly); Four-cylinder engines (production & assembly), six-cylinder engines (assembly) | 8,878 | 229,862 m^{2} (2,474,210 sq ft) |
| Bangalore | India | Daimler Truck Innovation Center India | 1400 | N/A |
| Berlin | Germany | Various engines, components, transmission parts and fuel systems | 2,538 | 501,502 m^{2} (5,398,120 sq ft) |
| Chennai | India | Trucks (LDT, MDT, HDT) under BharatBenz, Mercedes-Benz and Fuso brands Buses under BharatBenz | 2,540 | 1,600,000 m^{2} (17,000,000 sq ft) |
| Cikarang, Bekasi | Indonesia | Axor, Buses | —N/a | 146,000 m^{2} (1,570,000 sq ft) |
| Cleveland, North Carolina | USA | Class 8 truck models (Freightliner Cascadia / Western Star 47X, 49X and 57X) | 1,837 | —N/a |
| Detroit, Michigan | USA | Detroit Diesel Engines, transmissions, axle, electric axle, and battery assembly | 2,164 | —N/a |
| Dortmund | Germany | Transit-, interurban-, and mobility buses and coaches | 268 | —N/a |
| East London | South Africa | Mercedes trucks & buses, Fuso trucks | 2,743 | 603,600 m^{2} (6,497,000 sq ft) |
| Ebina | Japan | Fuso trucks, various bodies Chassis development | 430 | 83,000 m^{2} (890,000 sq ft) |
| Funza | Colombia | Chassis for buses | 542 | 11,000 m^{2} (120,000 sq ft) |
| Gaffney, South Carolina | USA | Chassis for school buses, shuttle buses, step vans and motor homes | 542 | —N/a |
| Gaggenau | Germany | Manual and automatic transmissions, axles, torque converters & pressed parts | 6,280 | 460,000 m^{2} (5,000,000 sq ft) |
| García | Mexico | Bus chassis assembly | 4000 | 42,709 m^{2} (459,720 sq ft) |
| Gastonia, North Carolina | USA | Parts production | 1,262 | —N/a |
| Hamburg | Germany | Axles and axle components, steering columns, components for exhaust emission technology and lightweight structural parts | 2,752 | 331,000 m^{2} (3,560,000 sq ft) |
| High Point, North Carolina | USA | School buses (assembly); Research and development | 1,316 | —N/a |
| Holýšov | Czech Republic | Motorcoach bodyworks and bus segments | 1,300 | —N/a |
| Istanbul-Hoşdere | Turkey | Body shop, cathodic dip painting, paint shop Transit- and interurban buses and coaches (assembly) | 4,421 | —N/a |
| Juiz de Fora | Brazil | Accelo & Actros (assembly) | 926 | —N/a |
| Kassel | Germany | Axles, drive shafts & other components | 2,820 | 435,873 m^{2} (4,691,700 sq ft) |
| Kawasaki | Japan | Fuso head office functions (Research and development, production of engines, axles & transmissions; LDT, MDT, HDT) | 4,670 | —N/a |
| Kirchheim unter Teck | Germany | EvoBus corporate headquarters Sales | 120 | —N/a |
| Kölleda | Germany | Three- and four-cylinder engines | 914 | 417,434 m^{2} (4,493,220 sq ft) |
| Ligny-en-Barrois | France | Transit buses & coaches (Assembly) | 375 | —N/a |
| Logan Township, New Jersey | USA | Fuso | —N/a | —N/a |
| Mannheim | Germany | Transit-, intercity buses and coaches (Body shop, cathodic dip painting, assembly) | 3,301 | —N/a |
| Mannheim | Germany | Foundry, engines (production & remanufacturing) and green technology engines) | 5,113 | 898,654 m^{2} (9,673,030 sq ft) |
| Molsheim | France | Customization of special purpose trucks | 527 | —N/a |
| Mount Holly, North Carolina | USA | Freightliner Business Class M2, 108SD, and 114SD assembly | 1,460 | —N/a |
| Neu-Ulm | Germany | Transit- and interurban buses & coaches (Paint shop and assembly) | 3,578 | —N/a |
| Portland, Oregon | USA | Truck assembly: Freightliner eCascadia / Western Star 47X, 49X; Research and development | 4,590 | —N/a |
| Sakura | Japan | Fuso proving ground & test track | 384 | —N/a |
| Saltillo | Mexico | Freightliner Cascadia | 2,972 | —N/a |
| Sámano-Castro Urdiales | Spain | Chassis | 246 | —N/a |
| Santiago Tianguistenco | Mexico | Freightliner M2 106, M2 112 and Cascadia / Western Star 57X | 1,610 | —N/a |
| São Bernardo do Campo | Brazil | Entire Latin American truck product range Engines, axles, transmissions, bus chassis Research and development | 12,788 | —N/a |
| Stuttgart | Germany | Company Headquarters; Engines, axles, transmissions & other components Pre-commissioning foundry and forge Research and development | 17,973 | 2,060,045 m^{2} (22,174,140 sq ft) |
| Toluca | Mexico | Refurbishing of engines, transmissions and other components | —N/a | —N/a |
| Toyama | Japan | Small, medium and large buses Product development | 646 | —N/a |
| Tramagal | Portugal | Fuso Canter | 307 | 39,900 m^{2} (429,000 sq ft) |
| Virrey del Pino, Buenos Aires Province | Argentina | Accelo, Atego, OF and OH bus chassis | 407 | |
| Wörth am Rhein | Germany | Actros, Antos, Arocs, Axor, Atego, Econic, Unimog, Zetros | 11,741 | —N/a |
