= Mercedes-Benz Arocs =

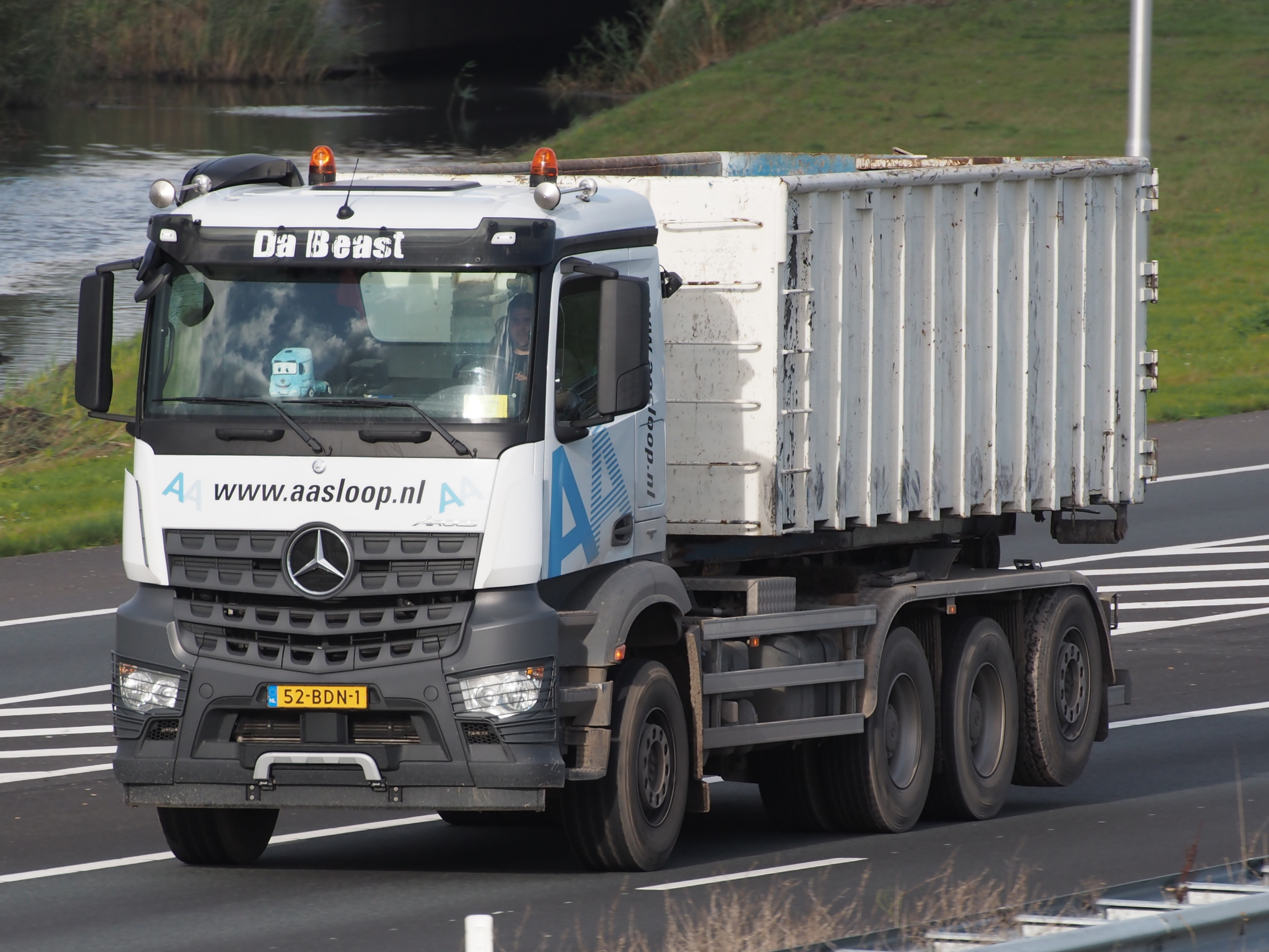

Overview
- Manufacturer: Daimler AG (2013–2019); Daimler Truck Holding AG (2019–present)
- Model years: 2013–present
- Assembly: Germany: Wörth

Powertrain
- Transmission: PowerShift 3
- Hybrid drivetrain: 4x2, 4x4, 6x2 DNA, 6x2 ENA, 6×2/2 VLA, 6×2/4 VLA, 6x4, 6x6, 8×2/4 ENA, 8×4 ENA, 8×4/4, 8×4/4 VLA, 8×6/4, 8×8/4

Chronology
- Predecessor: Mercedes-Benz Axor

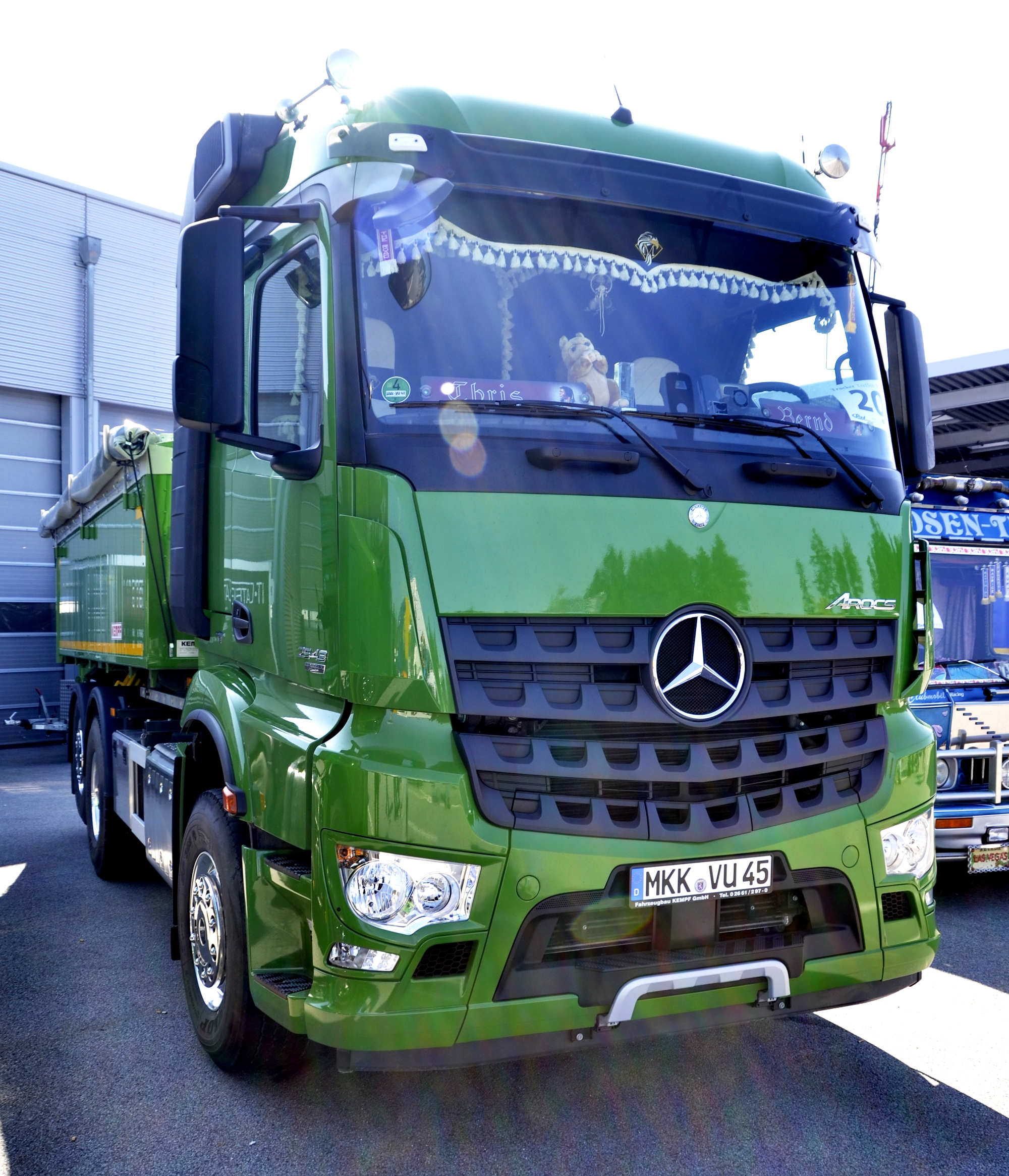
Mercedes-Benz Arocs 6×2

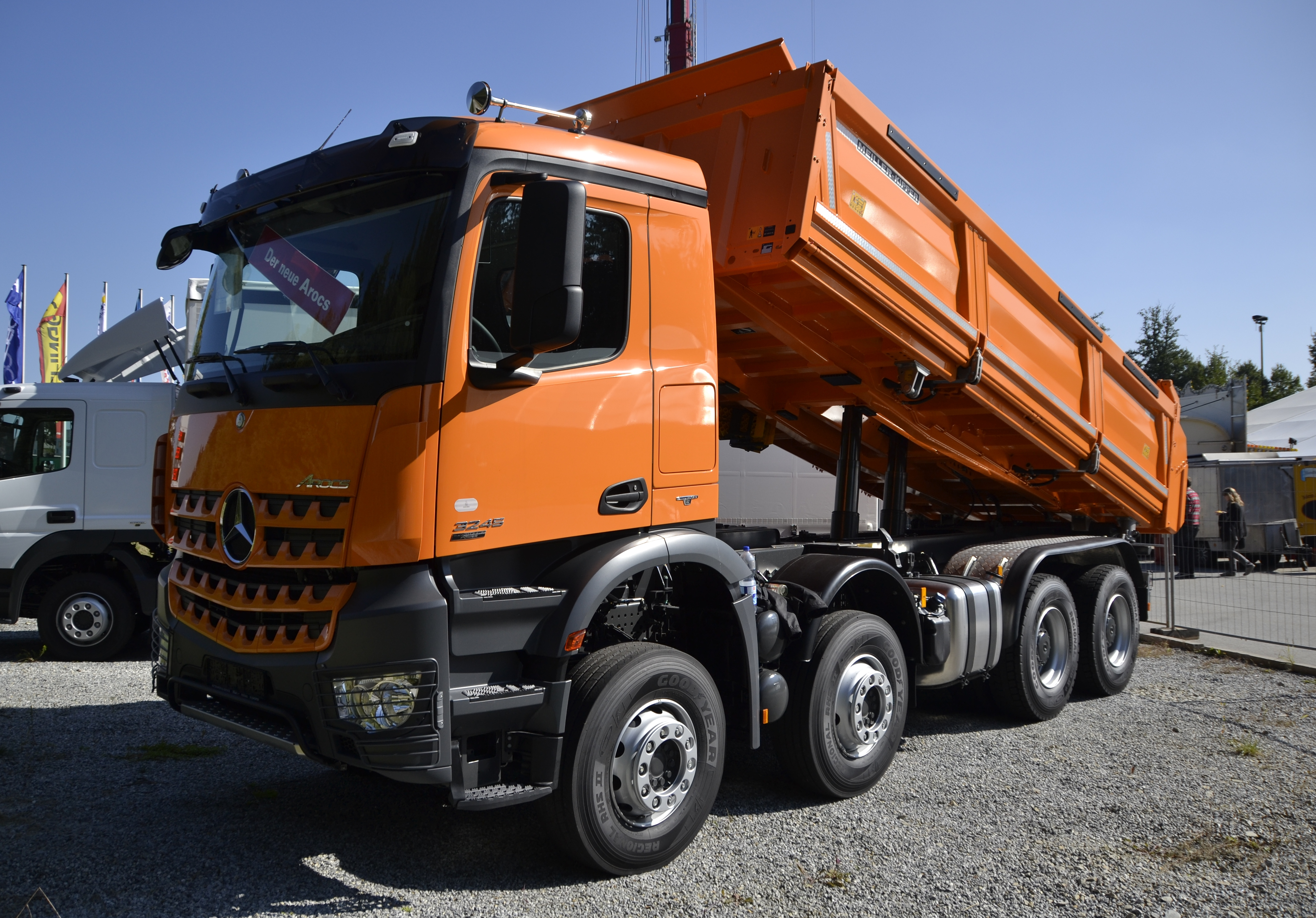
Mercedes-Benz Arocs 8×4 dump truck

The Mercedes-Benz Arocs is a heavy-duty truck, introduced by Mercedes-Benz in 2013.

== Construction ==
The Mercedes-Benz Arocs is aimed at the construction sector; available bodies include dump-trucks, concrete mixers, and tractors, with two, three, or four axles. Weights range from 18 to 41 tonnes (20 to 45 short tons). The Arocs has two main variants – the "Loader" and the "Grounder". The latter is a heavy-duty variant, with thicker 9-millimetre (0.35 in) frame rails.

== Engines NO position ==
All engines are Euro VI compliant:

- OM473, a new 15.6 litre engine with 386–466 kW (517–625 hp; 524–634 PS) and 3,000 N⋅m (2,200 lbf⋅ft) of torque.
- OM471
- OM470
- OM936

== Lego Technic model ==
Lego released the Mercedes-Benz Arocs 3245 as a Lego Technic model with power functions in 2015. The set included working outriggers, dump bed and pneumatic crane. The set had 2793 parts and was the flagship Lego Technic set of 2015.

== See also ==
- Media related to Mercedes-Benz Arocs at Wikimedia Commons
- List of Mercedes-Benz trucks
- List of Mercedes-Benz vehicles
