= Daimler Buses =

German bus and coach manufacturer

Daimler Buses GmbH
- Formerly: EvoBus GmbH
- Type: GmbH
- Industry: Automotive
- Founded: 23 February 1995
- Headquarters: Leinfelden-Echterdingen, Germany
- Key people: Till Oberwörder
- Products: Buses and Coaches
- Brands: Mercedes-Benz, Setra
- Number of employees: 17,899 (2016)
- Parent: Daimler Truck
- Website: www.daimlertruck.com

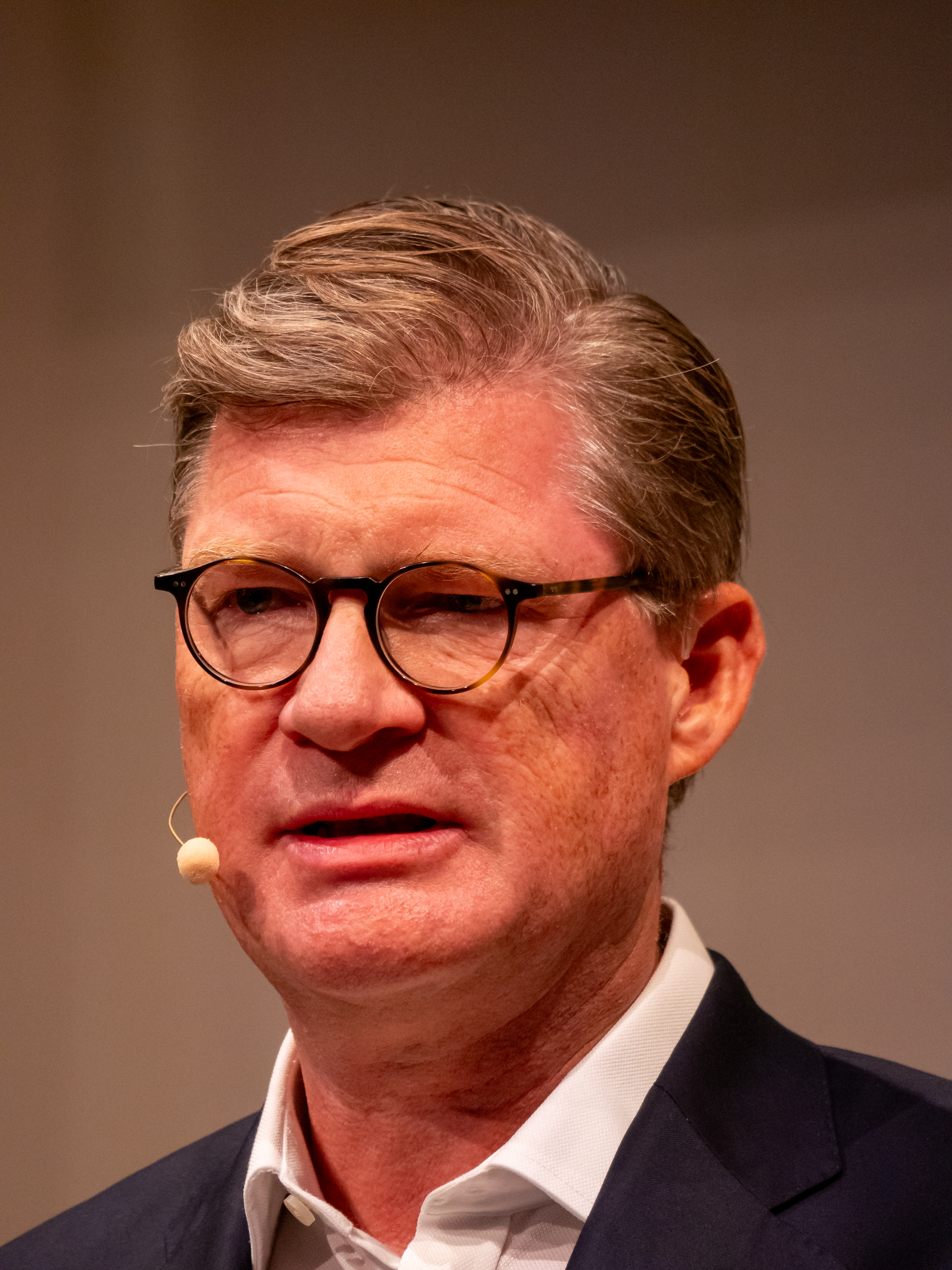
Till Oberwörder, CEO of Daimler Buses

Daimler Buses GmbH, formerly EvoBus GmbH, is a German bus and coach manufacturer headquartered in Leinfelden-Echterdingen, Germany and a wholly owned subsidiary of Daimler Truck. Its products go to market under the brands Mercedes-Benz and Setra.

== History ==
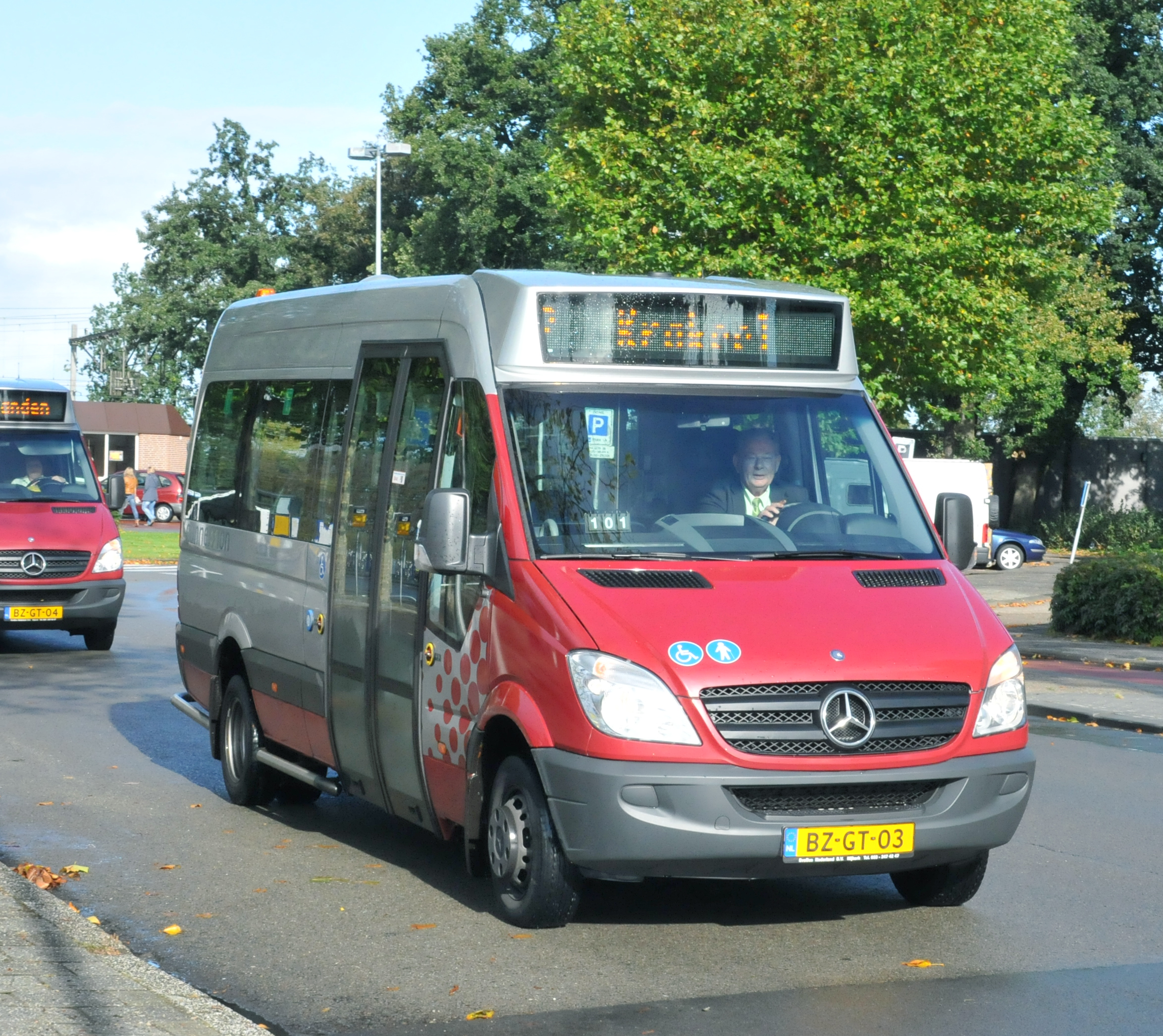
Mercedes-Benz Sprinter City 35 minibus built by then subsidiary Mercedes-Benz Minibus in 2011

In 1995, the bus division of Mercedes-Benz and bus manufacturer Setra amalgamated under the umbrella of EvoBus. Mercedes-Benz brought in more than 100 years of experience in the bus and coach industry, starting with the invention of the omnibus by Karl Benz in 1895 in Mannheim.

EvoBus is headquartered in Stuttgart in Germany, with its largest bus factory in Mannheim in Germany. Licensed buses are also manufactured in Turkey. The city buses, for instance the Citaro, are manufactured in Mannheim, as are the chassis (meaning the frame plus the "running gear" like engine, transmission, driveshaft, differential, and suspension). A body (sometimes referred to as "coachwork"), is built on the chassis to complete the coaches in Neu-Ulm, where the final assembly takes place. Other factories of EvoBus are in Ligny-en-Barrois in France, Holýšov in Czechia (Daimler Buses Česká republika s.r.o.) and in Sámano in Spain. In July 2023 EvoBus was rebranded Daimler Buses.

Its product portfolio include:

- Bus-specific service ranging from insurance and consulting to concepts for financing and the procurement of original parts and accessories.
- Sales network for new and used vehicles in Europe,
- Service network

In 2016, EvoBus had a workforce of 17,899 employees.

== Innovations ==
In April 1951, Setra introduced a coach with self-supporting structure.

By 1955 the company demonstrated a coach with the first independent air suspension at the German Motor Show in Frankfurt.

Since the 1990s, EvoBus has been experimenting with hydrogen fuel cells to use hydrogen as a primary source of power for the locomotion of buses.
