= Mercedes-Benz OM906 engine =

Diesel engine

The Mercedes-Benz OM906 or Mitsubishi 6S20 is a 6.4 liter (6,374cc) Straight-6 (I6) OHV Diesel engine with 3 valves per cylinder. It is related to the Straight-4 OM904 engine which has two cylinders chopped off, while the bore and stroke remain unchanged.

It launched in 1996 and had a Unit injector system to deliver fuel to every cylinder. It used a twin-scroll Turbocharger that was giving ~1-1.6atm of boost.

This engine is also used by Mitsubishi Fuso as 6S20, installed on Mitsubishi Fuso FJ series which is in turn a rebadged version of Mercedes Benz Axor produced by Bharatbenz in India.

Engine Details
Power:	170-210kW (228-282hp) @ 2,200 rpm	Height:	930mm (36.6in)
Torque:	810-1150Nm (597-848lb.ft) @ 1,200-1,600 rpm	Weight:	540kg (1,190lbs)
Aspiration:	Twin-scroll turbocharger, intercooler	Injection:	Direct injection
Compression Ratio:	18:1	Boost:	1-1.6atm
Bore:	102mm (4in)	Launch Year:	1996
Stroke:	130mm (5.1in)		
Displacement:	6,374cc (389CI)		
Redline:	2,300 rpm		
Length:	1,228mm (48.3in)		
Width:	640mm (25.2in)		

== Torque Curve ==
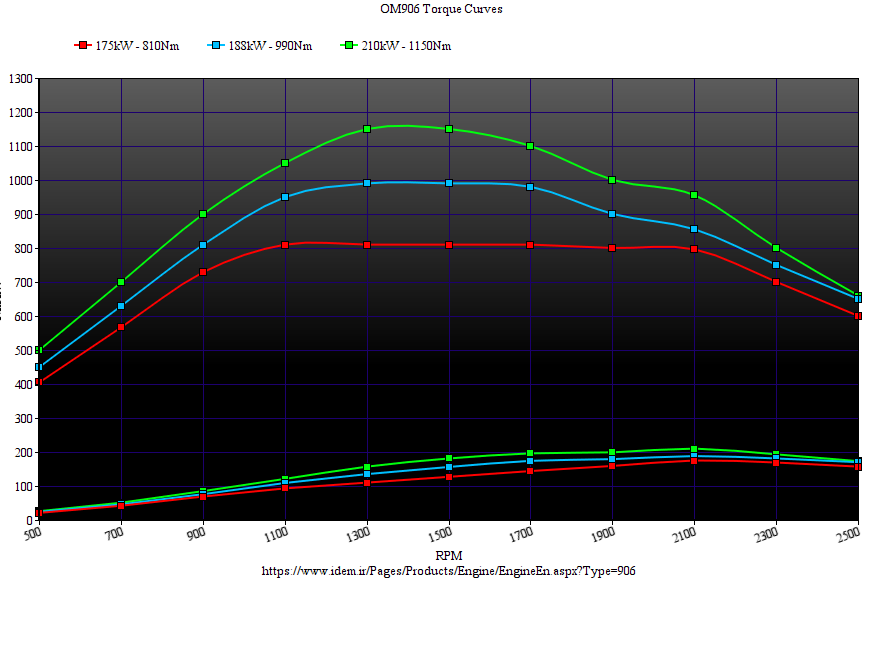

== See also ==
- List of Mercedes-Benz engines
