= Mercedes-Benz Antos =

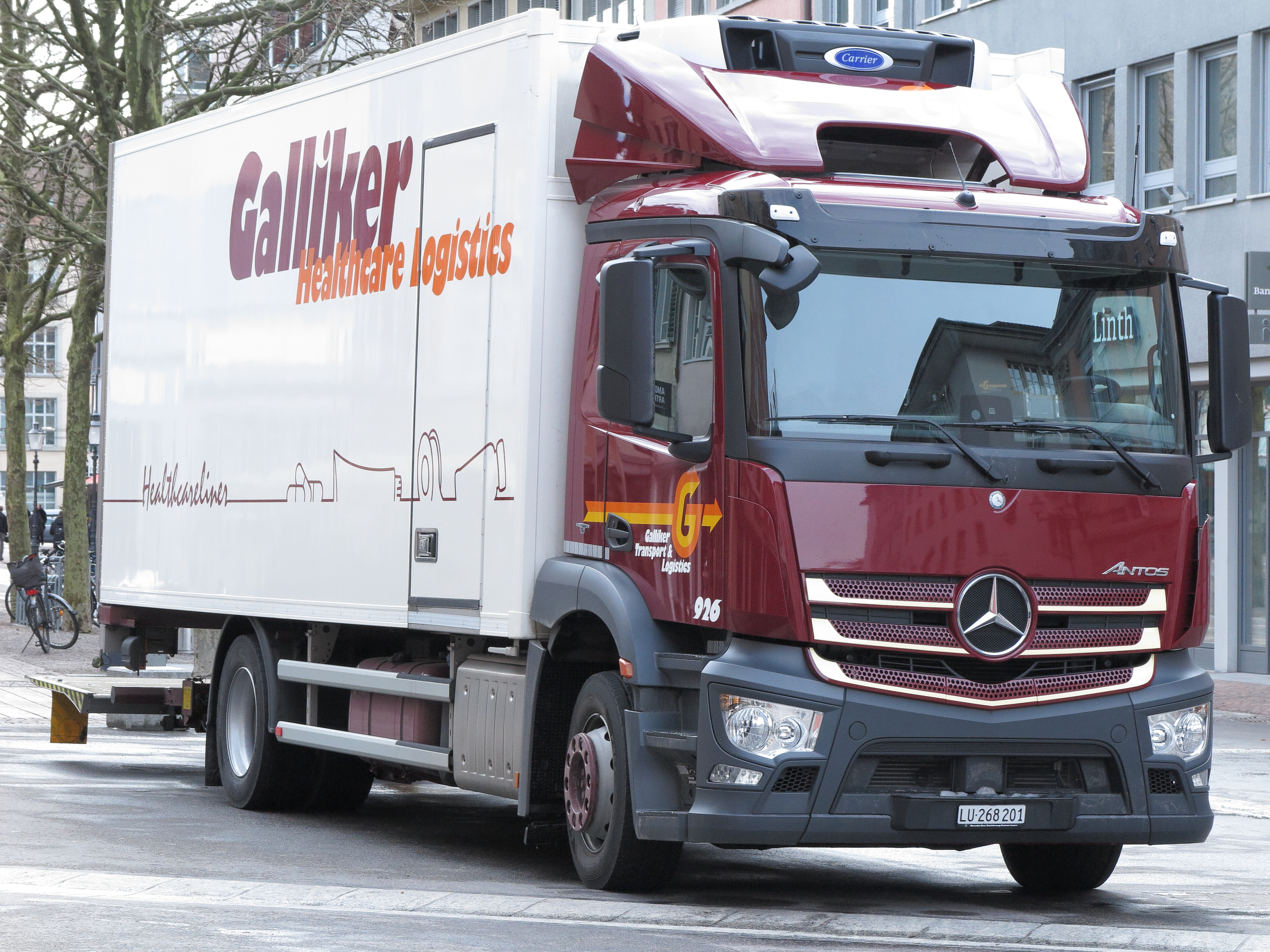

Overview
- Manufacturer: Daimler AG (2012–2019); Daimler Truck (2019–2021)
- Also called: Mercedes-Benz Antos
- Production: 2012–2021
- Model years: 2013–2021
- Assembly: Germany: Wörth

Powertrain
- Transmission: PowerShift 3 8, 12 or 16-speed

Chronology
- Predecessor: Mercedes-Benz Axor
- Successor: Mercedes-Benz Actros

The Mercedes-Benz Antos is a truck manufactured by Daimler Truck. The Antos together with Arocs succeeded Axor. It was announced in May 2012 with a formal launch scheduled for September 2012. The Antos was in turn succeeded by Mercedes Benz Actros in 2021.

The Antos is available as either a platform trucks or tractor units with the axle spacing ranging from 2,650 mm (104.3 in) up to 6,700 mm (263.8 in) with weights from 18t.

The Antos is available with a range of 13 power options from 175 kW (238 PS; 235 bhp) to 375 kW (510 PS; 503 bhp), all with Euro VI compliant 6-cylinder engines in three sizes: the OM 936 with 7.7 L, the OM 470 with 10.7 L, and the OM 471 with 12.8 L.
