= Mercedes-Benz Axor =

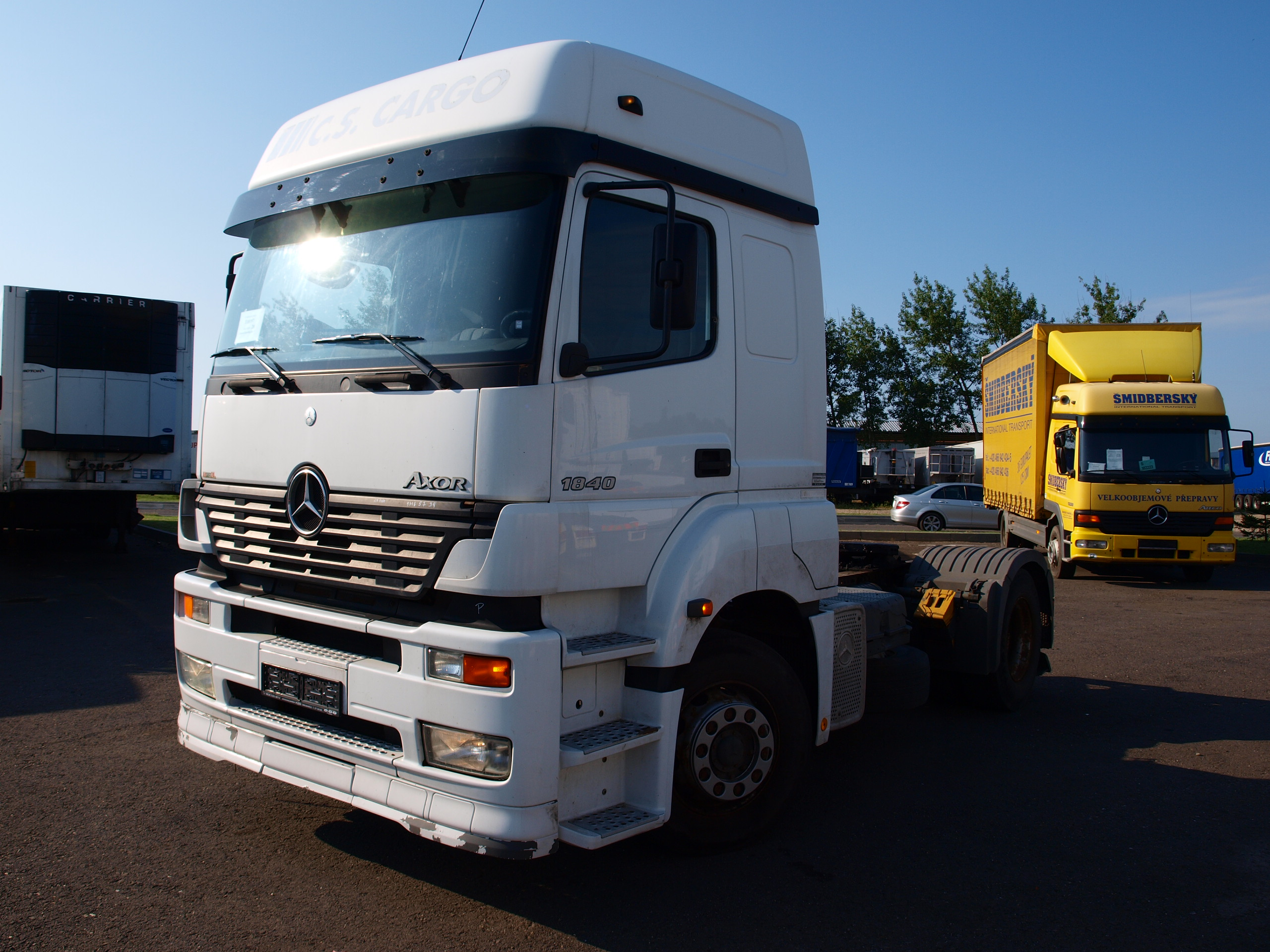

Overview
- Manufacturer: Daimler Truck
- Also called: BharatBenz HDT (India); Fuso FJ/FO Series
- Production: 2001–2013; 2025–present
- Assembly: Germany: Wörth am Rhein; Brazil: São Bernardo do Campo; Turkey: Aksaray (Mercedes-Benz Türk); India: Chennai (BharatBenz); Indonesia: Cikarang (DCVMI)

Body and chassis
- Class: Heavy truck
- Layout: 4x2 (18xx, 20xx); 6x2 (25xx); 6x4 (26xx); 8x2S (32xx); 8x4 (40xx)

Powertrain
- Engine: Turbodiesel with unit injectors: OM906 inline 6, 6,374 cc (389.0 cu in); OM926 inline 6, 7,201 cc (439.4 cu in); OM457 inline 6, 11,967 cc (730.3 cu in)

Chronology
- Predecessor: Mercedes-Benz Atego heavy lineup Mercedes-Benz SK rigid
- Successor: Mercedes-Benz Arocs (construction line); Mercedes-Benz Antos (rigid, Europe only); Mercedes-Benz Actros (rigid and tractor)

The Mercedes-Benz Axor is a heavy truck manufactured by Daimler Truck from 2001 to 2013 and returned since 2025, designed to fill the gap between the premium Actros tractors and the mostly rigid Atego trucks and was targeted at fleet customers. The model was succeeded by the Mercedes-Benz Antos and Mercedes-Benz Arocs in 2013 but it remained until now.

== Initial version ==
The truck has a relatively simple manual gear-shift, or alternatively, the Electronic Power Shift (EPS), is available, as well as a fully automatic box. The truck is powered by a 12-litre straight 6 engine (OM457LA), or 6.4-litre straight 6 engine (OM906)

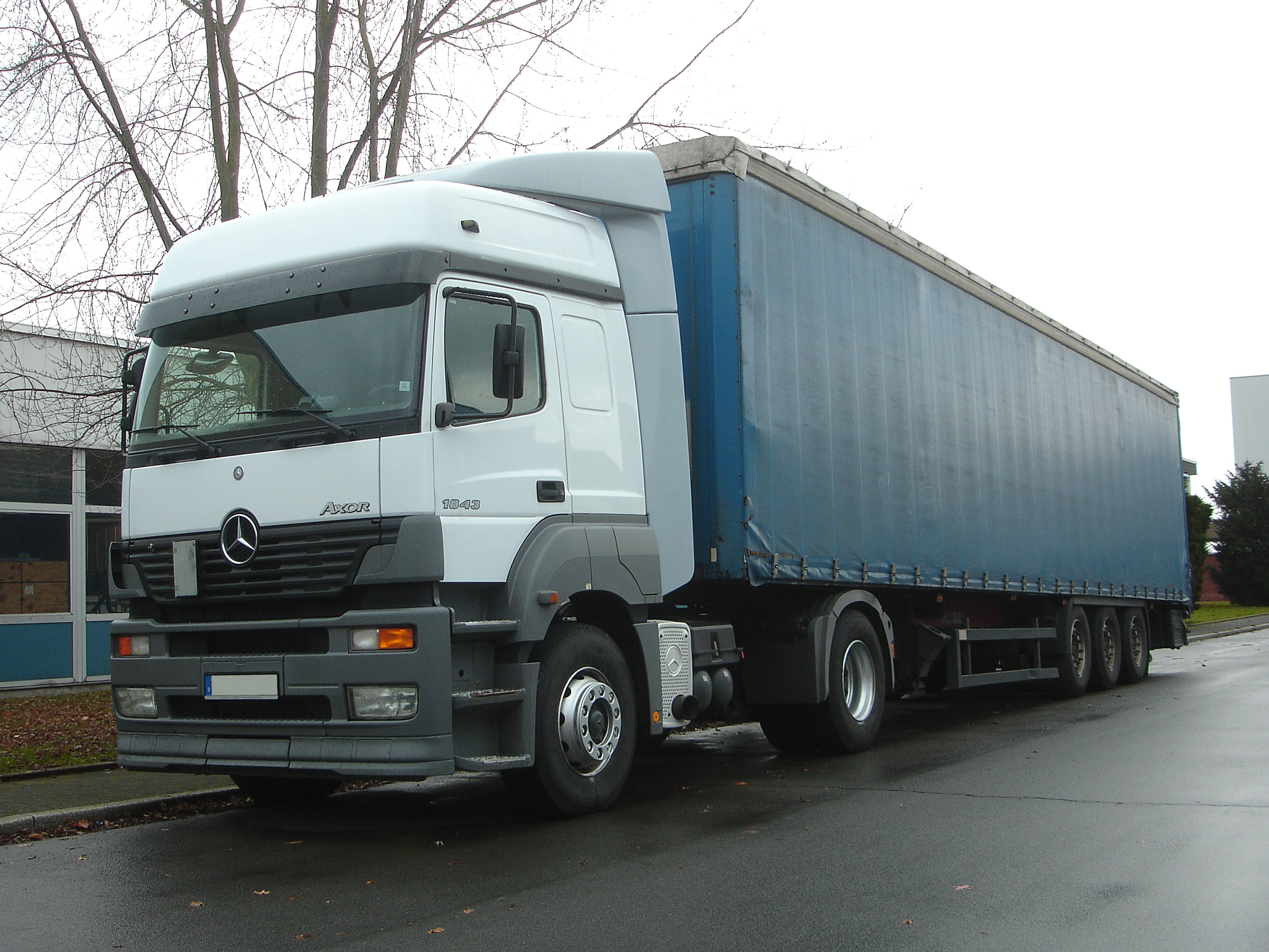
A pre-facelift Axor

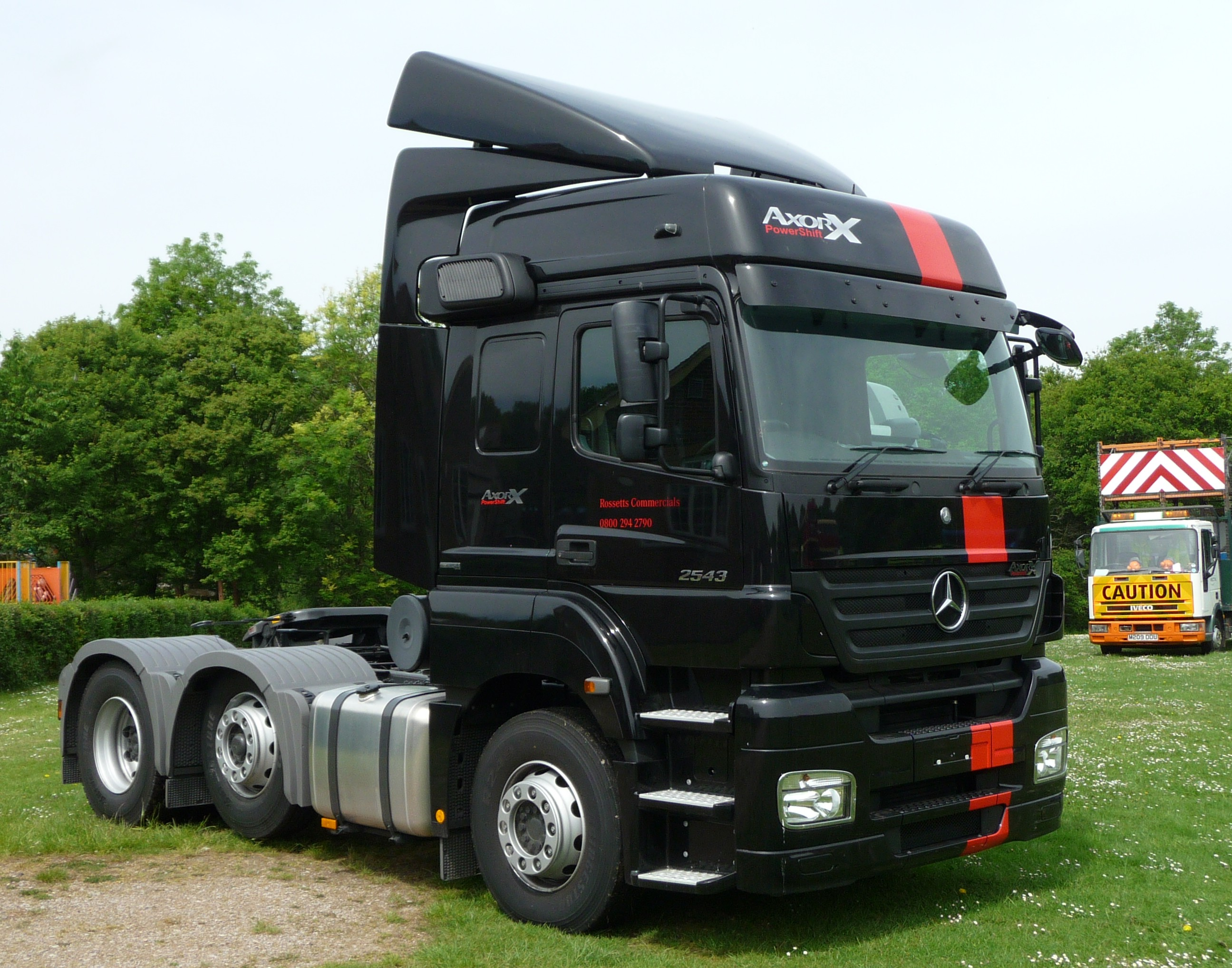
A Mercedes-Benz Axor 2543

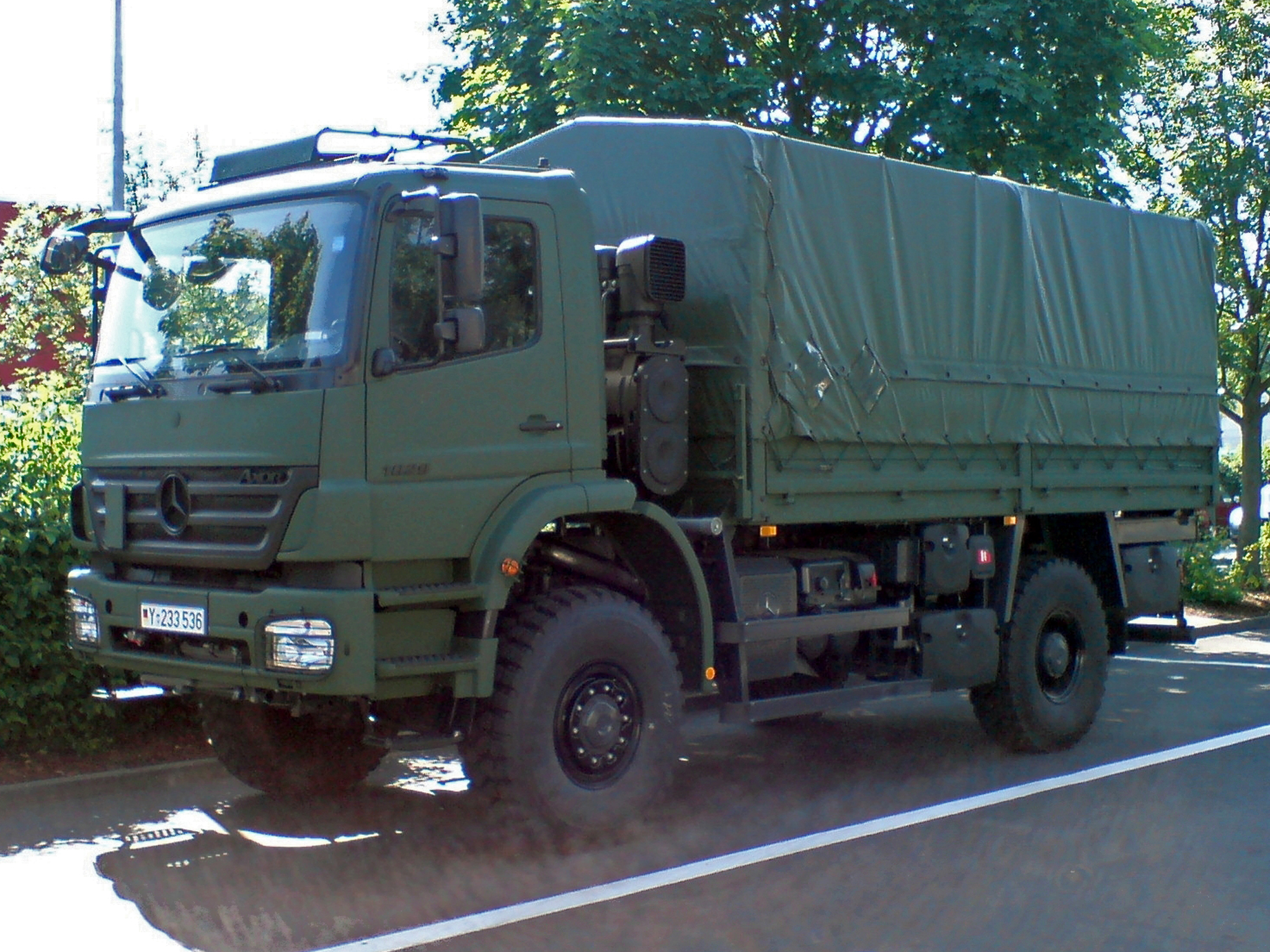
Mercedes Benz Axor 1829 A 4x4 of the Bundeswehr

== 2005 facelift ==
Originally the Axor was only available as a tractor but with the 2005 facelift, former Atego models over 18t were made part of the Axor Range.

== Rebadges ==
=== Fuso FJ/FO/FZ ===
In 2013, the Mitsubishi Fuso announced that the Indian-built, BharatBenz version of the Axor would be sold as the Fuso FJ, FO, and FZ series in some African and Asian markets. The FJ is the six-wheeled, 25-ton version, the eight-wheeled FO is rated for 31 tons, and the FZ is the tractor version, available with two or three axles. The Fuso FJ series uses the Mercedes-Benz OM906 engine, albeit under the name Mitsubishi 6S20.

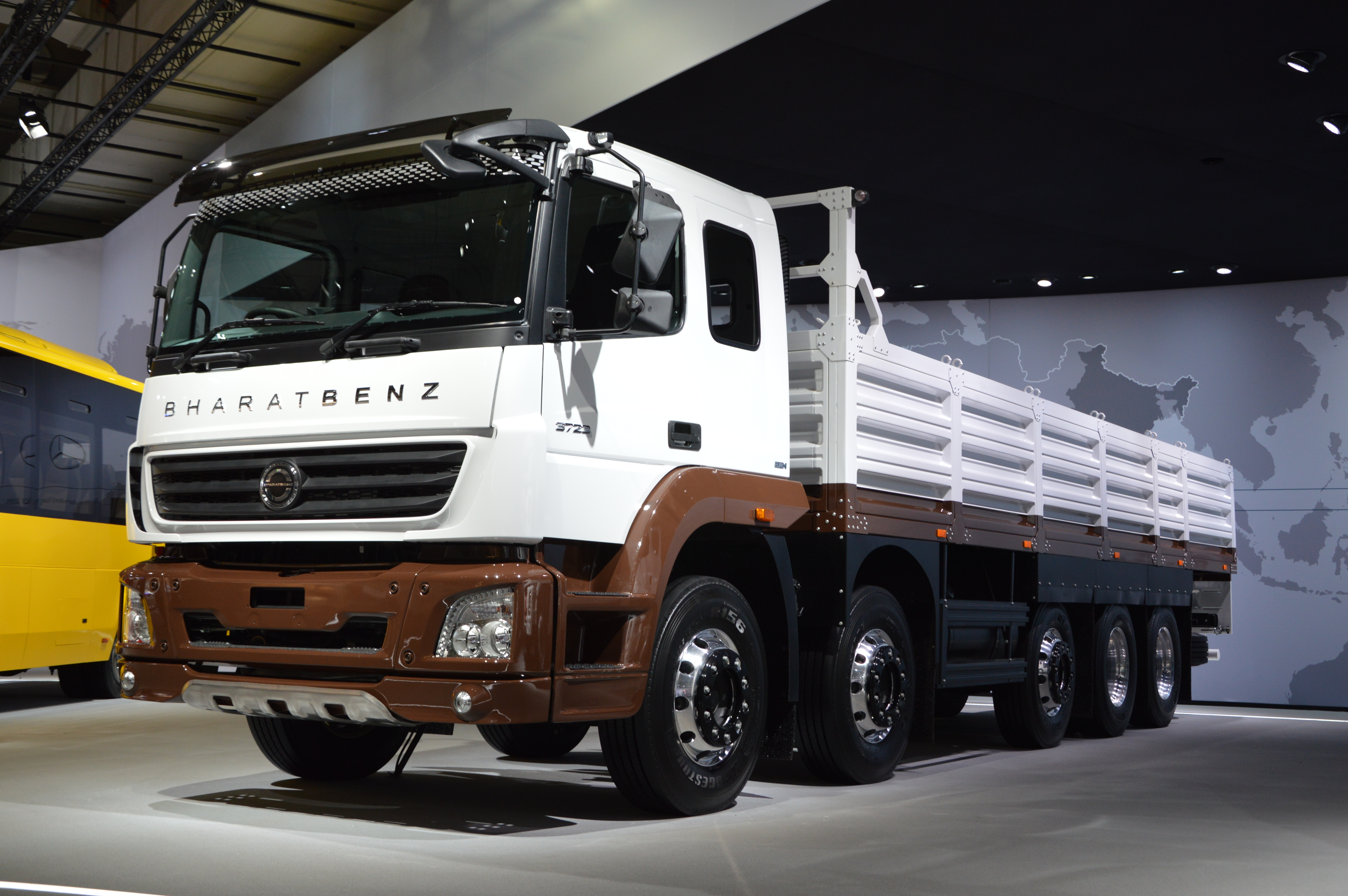
BharatBenz HDT 3723

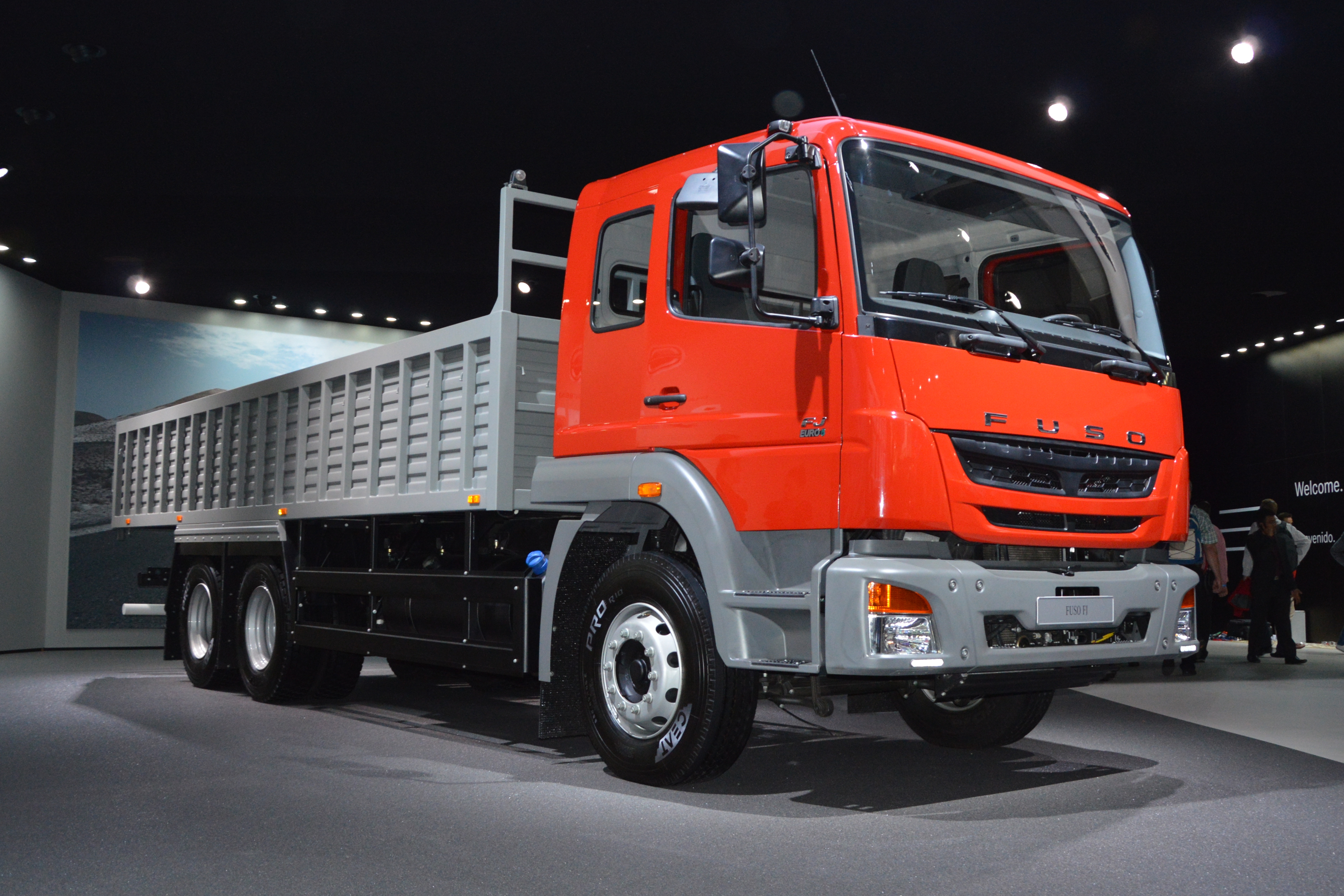
Mitsubishi Fuso FJ (built by BharatBenz)

== Models ==
Tractor

- Axor 4028 T (GVW 16T, 210 kW (280 hp))
- Axor 3340 S (GVW 33T, 299 kW (401 hp))

Rigid

- Axor 2528 R (GVW 25T, 210 kW (280 hp))
- Axor 2523 R/ 45 (GVW 25T, 170 kW (230 hp))
- Axor 2523 R/ 57 (GVW 25T, 170 kW (230 hp))
- Axor 1623 R/ 51 (GVW 16T, 170 kW (230 hp))
- Axor 1623 R/ 60 (GVW 16T, 170 kW (230 hp))

== See also ==
- BharatBenz
- Daimler Truck
- Mercedes-Benz Actros
