= Mercedes-Benz Atego =

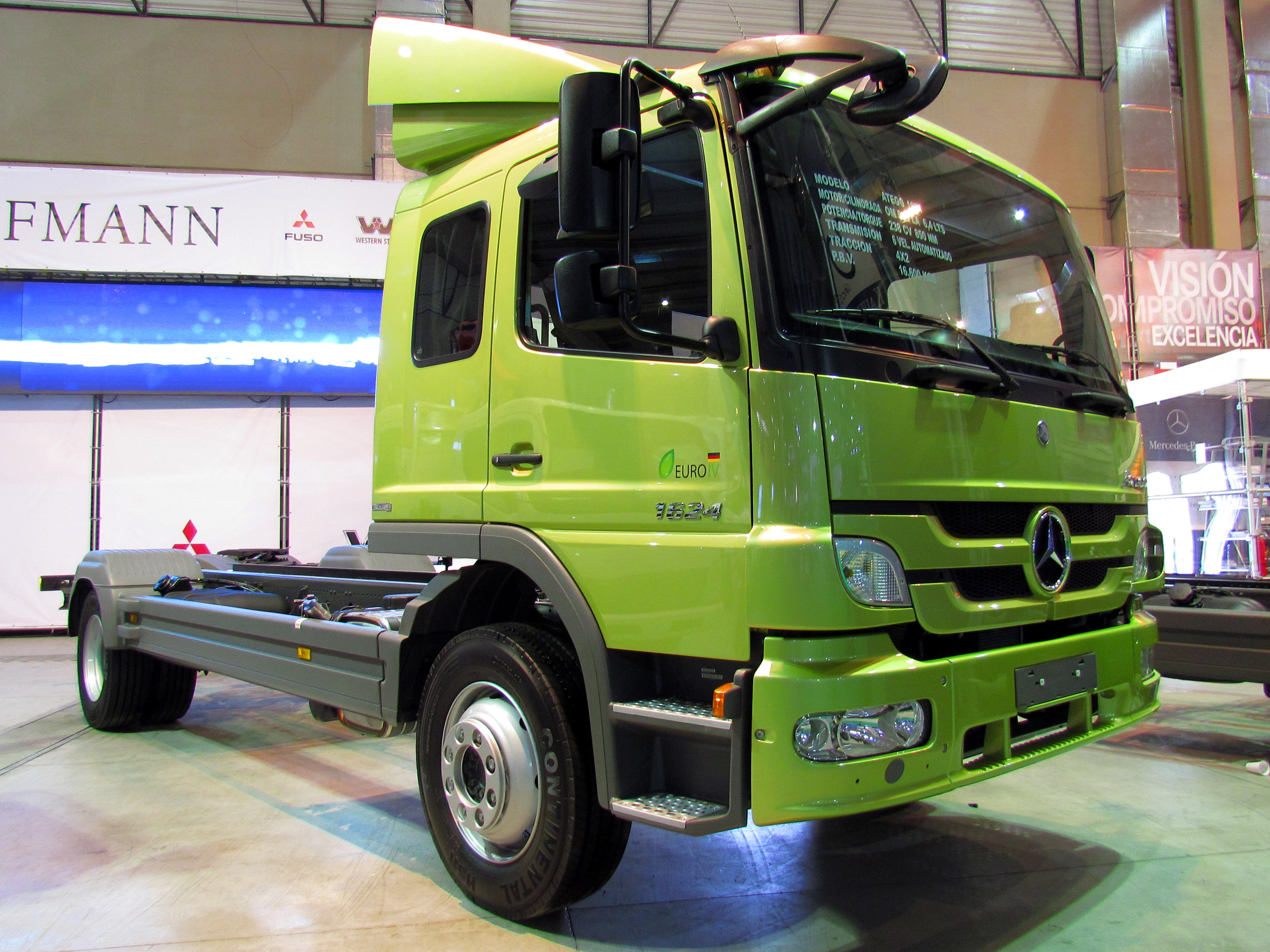

Overview
- Manufacturer: DaimlerChrysler AG (1998–2007); Daimler AG (2007–2019); Daimler Truck (2019–present)
- Production: 1998–present

Body and chassis
- Class: Large goods vehicle (N2, N3)
- Body style: Cab over engine (L/S)
- Related: Mercedes-Benz Axor

Chronology
- Predecessor: Mercedes-Benz LK

The Mercedes-Benz Atego is a range of general-purpose rigid trucks introduced by Daimler Truck in 1998. A new model was introduced in 2004, followed by a facelift in 2010 and another new model in 2013. The latest version is available in gross vehicle weights of 6.5 to 16 tonnes (t) and is powered by a straight 4- or 6-cylinder engine.

== First generation (1998) ==
First generation
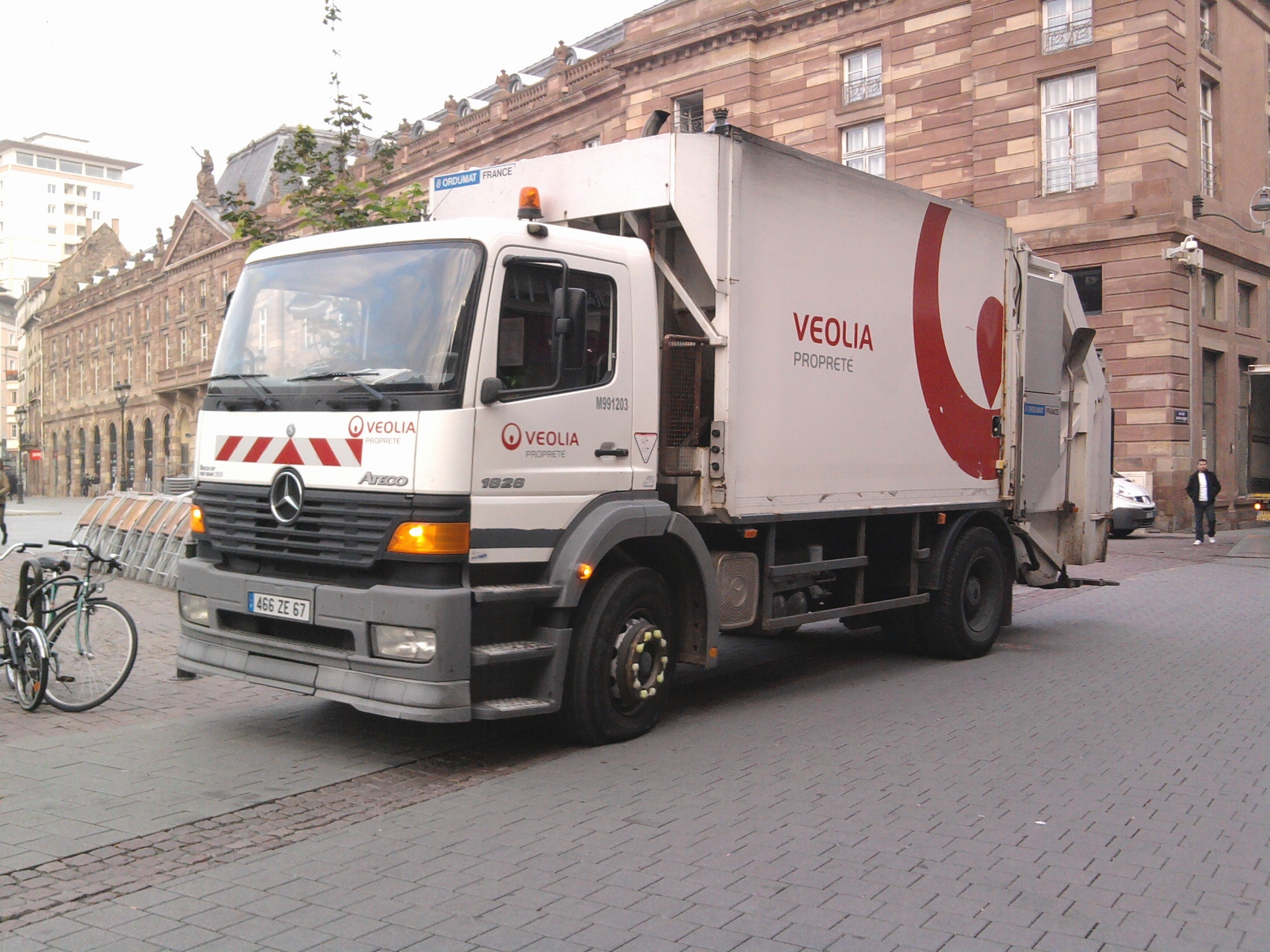

Overview
- Production: 1998–2004
- Assembly: Turkey: Aksaray; Germany: Wörth; Brazil: São Bernardo do Campo

The first generation Atego debuted in 1998. It was intended as a successor to the LK model range. At the time of its launch, the Atego offered a total of 25 different basic types and 240 model variants. Around 170,000 units were produced until 2004.

The truck won the International Truck of the Year award in 1999 which would later be supplemented with another win by the second generation Atego in 2011.

In 2000, a new 240 kW (326 hp) top-of-the-range version of the heavy Atego chassis was brought onto the market. In 2001, the new Axor model series emerged from the heavy-duty Atego weight class with gross vehicle weights of 18 to 40 tonnes. The Axor combined the heavy chassis of the Actros with the long Atego cab.

== Second generation (2004) ==
Second generation
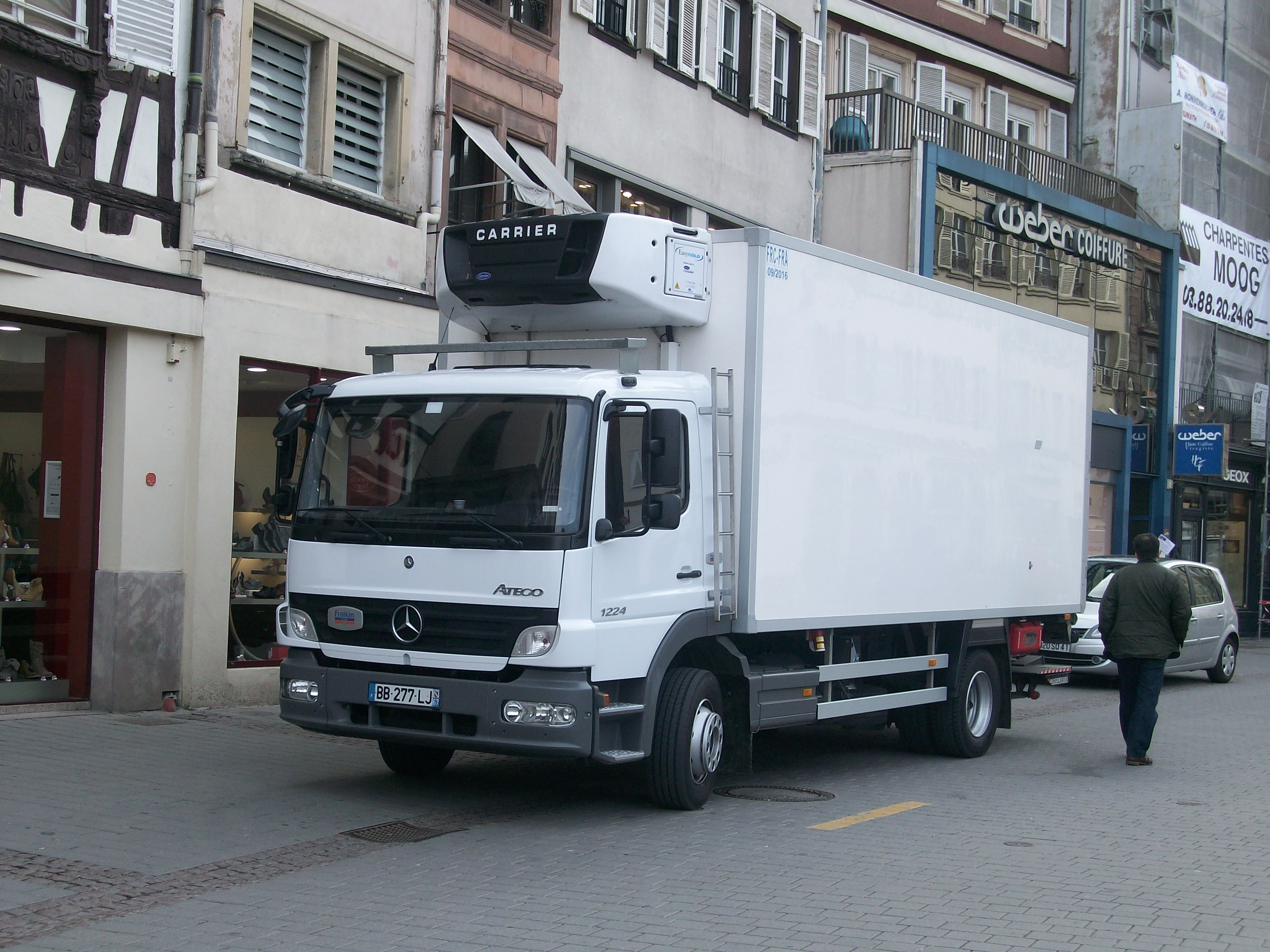

Overview
- Production: 2004–2013
- Assembly: Turkey: Aksaray; Germany: Wörth; Brazil: São Bernardo do Campo

Powertrain
- Engine: 4.3 L OM 904 LA diesel I4; 6.4 L OM 906 LA diesel I6
- Transmission: G56-6; G60-6; G85-6; G131-9; Allison 3000P

Dimensions
- Wheelbase: 3260–5360 mm
- Length: 6015–9665 mm
- Width: 2323–2441 mm
- Height: 2557–2949 mm
- Curb weight: 3652–5653 kg

The second generation Atego debuted in 2004 at the International Commercial Vehicle Show. The front section was redesigned, with new H7 clear-glass headlamps, high-set white-glass indicators, wind deflectors and new exterior mirrors. The interior of the four different cab variants was also completely redesigned, with the cockpit more grouped around the driver and a new climate control system which was more similar to the heavy-duty Actros models. A new nine-speed transmission replaced the previous twelve-speed transmission. The new Telligent automated gearshift was also introduced as an optional extra up to 175 kW (238 hp) along with a roll-back lock built into the Telligent brake system. Soon after launch, the Atego was linked to the Fleetboard telematics system.

In 2005, a 12-ton payload-optimised model was introduced, which had a low chassis, 17.5-inch tyres and a new 160 kW (218 hp) four-cylinder engine. Also in the same year, Atego models over 18 tonnes were renamed Mercedes-Benz Axor. In 2006, dump truck versions of the Atego were fitted with high-performance disc brake technology on all axles. The 250,000th Atego was delivered in June 2008. From March 2010 the entire Mercedes-Benz Atego series was made available with EEV (Enhanced Environmentally Friendly Vehicle) compliant engine versions.

The second generation Atego was initially available with three basic engine variants. The 4,250 cc inline-four OM 904 LA with 130 kW (177 hp) power, 675 N⋅m (498 lb⋅ft) torque, 17.75 to 1 compression ratio, and Unit-Pump System (UPS) technology single-nozzle fuel-injection pumps. The 6,374 cc inline-six OM 906 LA with 170 kW (231 hp) power and 810 N⋅m (597 lb⋅ft) torque or 205 kW (279 hp) power and 1,100 N⋅m (811 lb⋅ft) torque. Both variants with Unit-Pump System technology with single-plunger fuel-injection pumps and centrally arranged 6-hole injection nozzles.

There were five different gearboxes available for the Atego. Firstly, the G56, G60 and G85 all-synchromesh manual gearboxes with six forward gears and one reverse gear. They were available with engine-mounted linkage gearshift (G56 and G60), hydraulic gearshift (G85) or Telligent automated gearshift. The G131-9 was a direct-drive gearbox with eight synchronised forward gears, one constant-mesh crawler gear and one reverse gear. It consisted of a 4-speed basic gearbox with pneumatic rear-mounted range unit. Gears were shifted hydropneumatically. Last but not least was the Allison 3000P electronically controlled automatic gearbox. It featured five forward gears and one reverse gear. The chassis was available in wheelbase lengths between 3,260 mm and 5,360 mm at standard spacing of 300 mm. The frame rails featured a continuous hole spacing of 50 mm. Frame components were made of cold-formed E 380 TM and E 500 TM high-strength steel. It consisted of a two-piece modular frame with two symmetrical Z-profile members on front end and straight, untapered, U-shaped longitudinal flange at the rear which were interconnected by means of riveted gusset plates. The front suspension had parabolic leaf springs and for the rear there was a choice of leaf springs or air-suspension with Telligent level control. Steering was power assisted, recirculating ball with variable steering gear ratio.

=== Facelift (2010) ===
The new facelifted Atego appeared in 2010. The design of the front section was given more resemblance to the current Actros. With regards to the interior, a multifunction steering wheel was made standard on all versions of the Atego, the instrument cluster was redesigned and seats received new fabrics. There were three BlueTec Euro V standards compliant engines to choose from, with power output ranging from 95 kW (129 hp) to 210 kW (286 hp). The new model could also be fitted with a new permanent magnet retarder with up to 180 kW braking power (maximum torque 650 Nm) to help reduce brake and tyre wear on demanding roads.

=== Atego BlueTec Hybrid ===
The Atego BlueTec Hybrid was premiered in November 2007 at the opening event of the "Shaping Future Transportation" initiative in Stuttgart. Daimler developed it together with Eaton, who supplied the hybrid system which included the lithium-ion battery pack and electric motor and helped develop the power management logic and controls. The first five prototype vehicles were deployed by DHL to conduct tests and the first 50 vehicles were sold at the end of 2009. Series production was scheduled to start in 2010.

The initial hybrid truck was based on the 12-ton Atego 1222 L EEV and featured a 160 kW (218 hp) OM 924 LA turbodiesel engine and a 44-kW water-cooled AC permanent magnet electric motor. The engine also featured a start/stop system. It used a G85-6 automatic transmission. The electric motor was located behind the internal combustion engine and clutch, but in front of the transmission. Electrical energy was stored in lithium-ion batteries, which was fed via the electric motor when braking and allowed moving off under electric power, but also helped optimise the diesel engine's characteristic map. Additional components included a converter, hybrid control system and cooling system. The additional weight compared to a regular Atego was around 350 kg. According to Daimler the Atego hybrid could achieve fuel savings of around 10 - 15 percent compared with an equivalent conventional diesel-powered vehicle.

=== Coaches ===
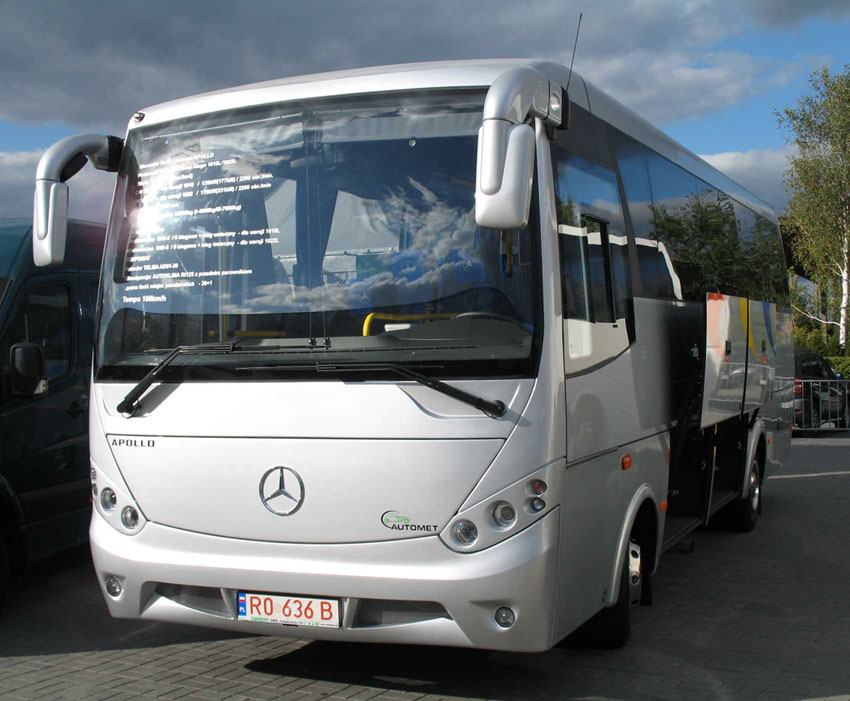
2007 Automet Apollo

The chassis of the Atego is also used by Unvi to produce 27-41 seat coaches, designated Cimo, Voyger GT and Touring GT, which are custom built in Spain. Polish coach company Automet produced a 30-36 seat coach, the Apollo, based on this chassis. Also, Chilean coachbuilder LR bodied some midibuses on the Atego 1016 chassis. The cab area and dashboard on the coach conversions are identical to those used in the Atego goods vehicles.

== Third generation (2013) ==
Third generation
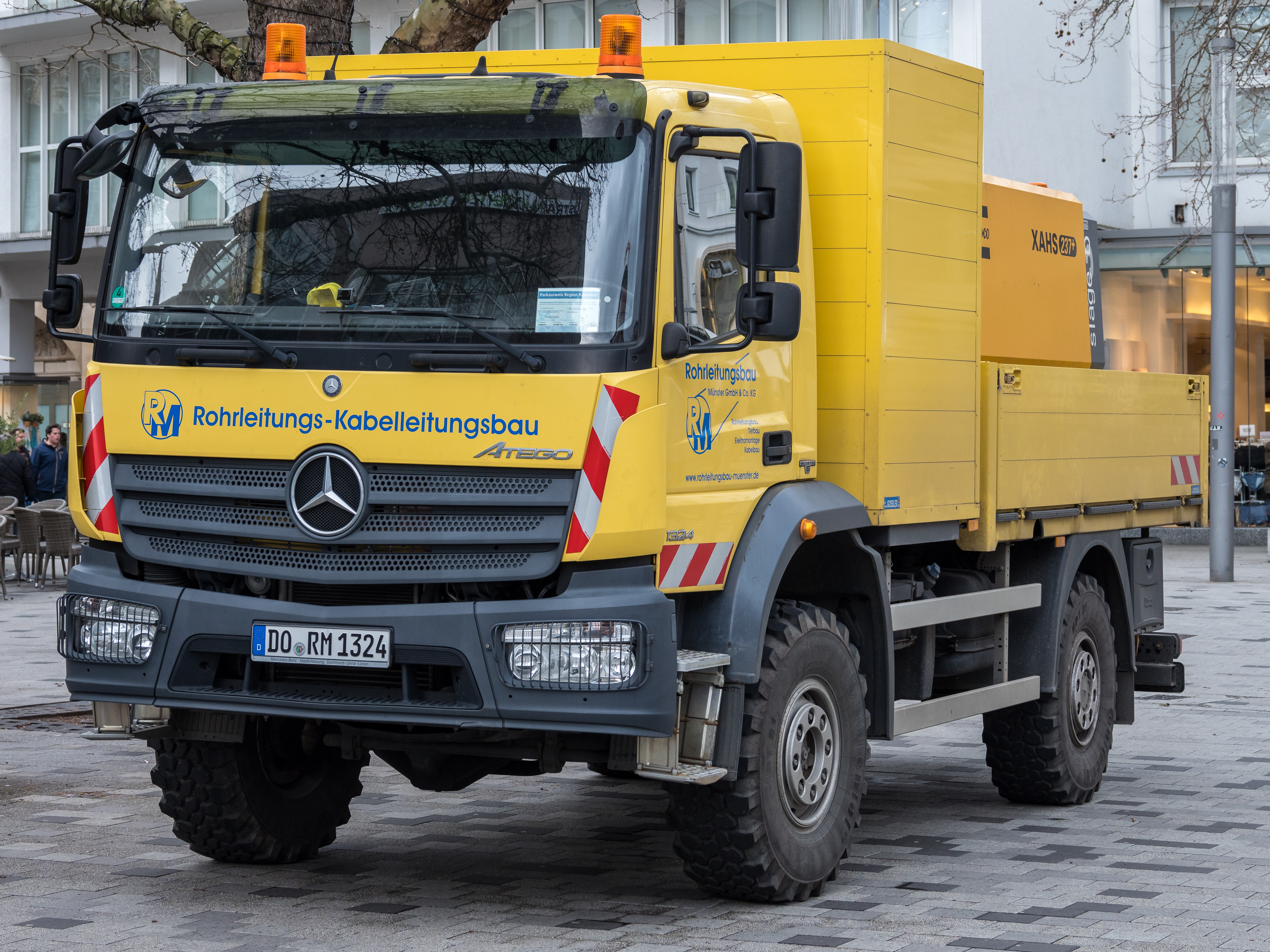

Overview
- Production: 2013–present
- Assembly: Turkey: Aksaray; Germany: Wörth; Brazil: São Bernardo do Campo; Algeria: Rouiba; Argentina: Virrey del Pino (since 2016)

Powertrain
- Engine: Mercedes-Benz OM 934; Mercedes-Benz OM 936
- Transmission: Mercedes PowerShift 3

Dimensions
- Wheelbase: 3020–6260 mm

The third generation Atego was introduced in 2013 with gross vehicle weight ranging from 6.5 t to 16 t. It was made available with seven new engines based on the inline four-cylinder OM 934 model with 5.1 L displacement and inline six-cylinder OM 936 model with 7.7 L displacement. Performance for the four new OM 934 engines range from 115 kW (156 hp) to 170 kW (231 hp) and for the three new OM 936 engines from 175 kW (238 hp) to 220 kW (299 hp). The engines conform to the Euro VI emissions standard and feature common rail injection, cooled exhaust gas recirculation, an exhaust box with an integrated selective catalytic reduction system and closed particulate filter. The trucks are available with six or eight speed Mercedes PowerShift 3 automatic transmission and six- or nine-speed power-assisted manual transmissions. Electronic stability control is also available along with a permanent magnet retarder. Furthermore, it features a newly designed bumper with integrated daytime running lamps.

=== Safety ===
Euro NCAP test results Mercedes-Benz Atego 4x2 Rigid (2026)
Test	Score
Overall:	4 /5 stars
Safe driving	77%
Crash avoidance	56%
Post crash	80%

== Motorsport ==
=== Race truck ===
Race truck versions of the trucks are called Mercedes-Benz Race Truck. Built by LARAG in the Eastern Switzerland canton of St. Gallen. The race trucks have competed in the ADAC Truck Grand Prix and the NRW Truck Cup.

Ludovic Faure won the FIA European Truck Racing Championship in 1998 using an Atego Renntruck. FIA ETRC vehicles develop 1200 hp and 5,600 Nm of torque. Minimum weight is 5400 kg, and the trucks have 6-speed ZF transmissions, with water-cooled disc brakes. This gives a similar power-to-weight ratio as a World Rally Car.

=== Rally Raid ===
In 2008, a Mercedes-Benz Atego 1725 race truck took a part in the Brazilian rally raid Rally dos Sertões. The vehicle won this rally in its class (T4.2, for trucks with full weight from 4801 to 5800 kg). This truck develops more than 400 hp and torque of 1800 Nm.
