= Bex (disambiguation) =

Bex is a municipality in Switzerland.

Bex or BEX may also refer to:

== People ==
- Bex, a form of the given name Rebecca
- Christophe Bex (born 1961), French politician
- Shannon Bex (born 1980), American singer and dancer
- Bex Marshall, British musician
- Bex Taylor-Klaus (born 1994), American actress
- Bex Wilson (born 1991), British bobsleigh brakewoman
- Ray "Bex" Callister (born 1976), child actor who starred in TV series Jossy's Giants
- Bex Atwell, character in the 2005 British sitcom According to Bex
- Bex Mack, character in the 2017 American series Andi Mack
- Bex, a fictional character from the animated series Super Duper Bunny League

== Other uses ==
- Bex (compound analgesic)
- FC Bex, a football team from Switzerland
- RAF Benson (IATA code: BEX), a Royal Air Force station in England
- Business Express Airlines, a former American airline
- Jur Modo language (ISO 639 code: bex), a language of Sudan
- Bexhill railway station, a railway station in Sussex, England

== See also ==
- Becks (disambiguation)
- Becs (disambiguation)
- Protein BEX1 and Protein BEX2
