= Stege =

Strege may refer to:

- Stege, Denmark, a town on the island of Møn in south-eastern Denmark
  - Stege Church
- Stege, California, a former town in western Contra Costa County, California
- Stege Creek, an alternate name for Baxter Creek, used especially in the Booker T. Washington Park and Stege Marsh areas
- Stege Marsh, a wetlands area in Richmond, California
- Stege and Waidbach, two small rivers in Mecklenburg-Vorpommern, Germany

People with the surname, Stege, include:

- Richard Stege, founder of Stege, California
- Tina Stege, climate envoy for the Marshall Islands
