= Becq =

Becq may refer to:

- Becque (river)
- Sonja Becq (born 1957), Belgian politician
- Maria Strick (née Becq; 1577–after 1631), Dutch schoolmistress and calligrapher
- Louis Becq de Fouquières (1831–1887), French man of letters

== See also ==
- Germanic toponymy
- Becque (disambiguation)
- Bec (disambiguation)
- Beek (disambiguation)
