= Bec (placename element) =

Placename element

Bec can be sometimes a place-name element meaning pino'cape' (from the bird's beak, bec)

Bec is more commonly a place-name element in Normandy, deriving from Norse bekkr, 'stream' (cf. German Bach, English -beck), which is found in many placenames.

== Part of a name ==
- Bec-de-Mortagne, Seine-Maritime
- Notre-Dame-du-Bec, Seine-Maritime
- Le Bec Hellouin, Eure
- Abbaye Notre-Dame du Bec, Eure
- Le Bec-Thomas, Eure
- Malleville-sur-le-Bec, Eure

== Suffix ==
- Bolbec, Seine-Maritime
- Bricquebec, Manche
- Caudebec-en-Caux, Seine-Maritime
- Caudebec-les-Elbeuf, Seine-Maritime pino
- Foulbec, Eure
- Houlbec-Cocherel, Eure
- Houlbec-près-le-Gros-Theil, Eure
- Orbec, Orne
- Robec, stream in Rouen, Seine-Maritime222
- Lubec, Maine

== England ==
- Tooting Bec, London
- Weedon Bec, Northamptonshire

== Other ==
- Saint-Julia-de-Bec, Aude3425

== Variation ==
- Beck (surname)
- River Beck
- Beek (disambiguation)
- Becque (disambiguation)
- Becquet
- Becket
