= Beeks =

Beeks is an English surname. Notable people with this name include:

- Clarence Beeks (1922–1982), American jazz musician
- Jalen Beeks (born 1993), American baseball player
- Ricky Beeks (died 1990), victim of Jeffrey Daumer
- Scott Beeks (born 1999), English footballer
- Steve Beeks (born 1971), English footballer and coach
- William T. Beeks (1906–1988), American judge from Washington
- William T. Beeks (Maryland politician) (1829–1898), American politician from Maryland

== Other ==
- Beeks Place

== See also ==
- Beek (disambiguation)
