= Becque (river) =

River in France

Becque (French pronunciation: [bɛk]) is a French spelling of the Old West Flemish word beke, Dutch Beek, meaning 'beck': small water stream, smaller than a river. A number of small rivers flowing in Nord département (northern France) and Belgium are called Becque(s) or Becq.

Rivers called Becque include:

- Becque d'Hardelot
- Becque de Méteren
- Becque de Steenwerck, a tributary of the Scheldt
- Becque du Biez, a tributary of the Lys
- Becque du Doulieu
- Ey Becque, a tributary of the Yser
- Peene Becque, a tributary of the Yser
- Sale Becque, a tributary of the Yser
- Zwyne Becque, a tributary of the Yser

Becq, a word with the same meaning for a stream, may be found in:

- Esquelbecq, a village in Nord département, France
- Robecq, a village in Nord département, France

== See also ==
- Germanic toponymy
- Becq (disambiguation)
- Becque (disambiguation)
- Bec (disambiguation)
- Beek (disambiguation)
