= Beke =

Beke may refer to:

- Beke (surname), a surname
- Beke language, an Eastern Sudanic language of Darfur
- Beke people, the descendants of the early European settlers in the French Antilles
- Beke, Amasya, a village in the Amasya Province, Turkey
- Beke (Lippe), a river of North Rhine-Westphalia, Germany
- Beke (Warnow), a river of Mecklenburg-Vorpommern, Germany
- Béke, Hungarian name of Mierovo, a village and municipality in south-west Slovakia
- BEKE, Bantu Educational Kinema Experimentin the mid-1930s

== See also ==
- Beek (disambiguation)
- Beki
