= Steep Holm =

Island in the Bristol Channel, United Kingdom

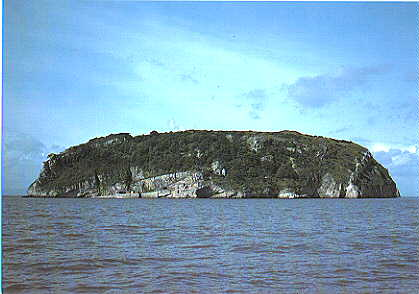

Geography
- Location: Bristol Channel
- Coordinates: 51°20′23″N 3°06′35″W
- Length: 1 km (0.6 mi)
- Width: 400 m (1300 ft)
- Highest point: 78 m (256 ft)

Administration
- England
- Unitary Authority: North Somerset
- Ceremonial County: Somerset

Additional information
- Official website: www.steepholm.online

Steep Holm (Old English: Ronech and later Steopanreolice) is an English island lying in the Bristol Channel. The island covers 48.87 acres (19.78 ha) at high tide, expanding to 63.26 acres (25.60 ha) at mean low water. At its highest point it is 78 metres (256 ft) above mean sea level.

Administratively it forms part of the unitary authority of North Somerset within the ceremonial county of Somerset. Between 1 April 1974 and 1 April 1996 it was administered as part of Avon. Nearby is Flat Holm island, part of Wales.

The Carboniferous Limestone island rises to about 200 feet (61 m) and serves as a wind and wave break, sheltering the upper reaches of the Bristol Channel. The island is now uninhabited, with the exception of the wardens. It is protected as a nature reserve and Site of Special Scientific Interest (SSSI) with a large bird population and plants including wild peonies. There was a signal station or watchtower on the island in Roman times, but there may have been human habitation as early as the Iron Age. In the 6th century it was home to St Gildas and to a small Augustinian priory in the 12th and 13th centuries. An inn was built in 1832 and used for holidays in the 19th century. A bird sanctuary was established in 1931 and since 1951 has been leased to charitable trusts. It is now owned by the Kenneth Allsop Memorial Trust.

In the 1860s the island was fortified with ten 7-inch rifled muzzle loaders as one of the Palmerston Forts for the coastal defence of the Bristol Channel until it was abandoned in 1898. The infrastructure was reused in World War I and II when Mark VII 6-inch breech-loading guns and searchlights were installed. To enable the movement of materials, soldiers from the Indian Army Service Corps initially used mules and then installed a cable-operated winched switchback railway.

== Geology and ecology ==
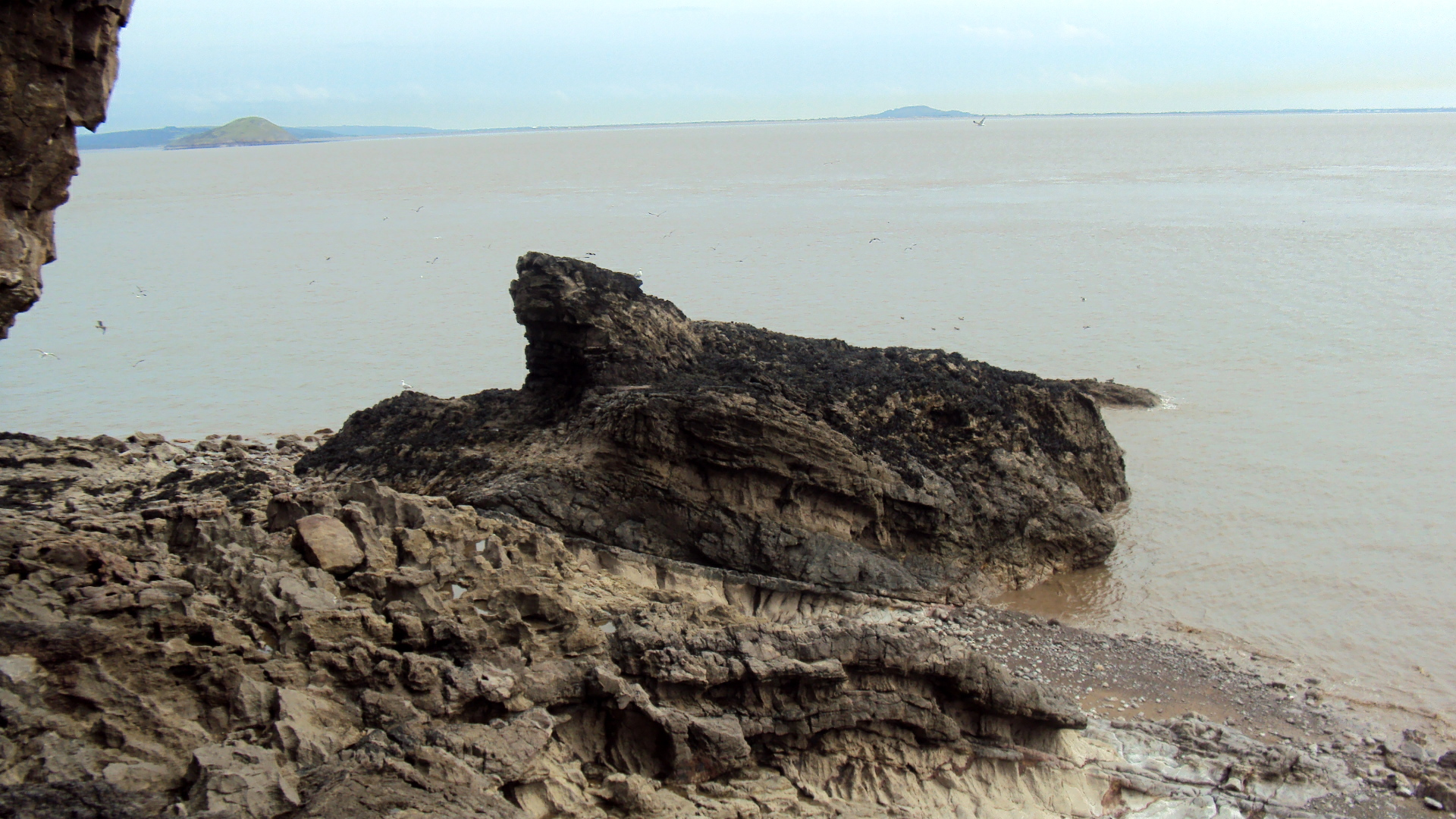
Calf Rock, the south-east extent of the island

The island is formed of Carboniferous Limestone and is often described as geologically a continuation of the Mendip Hills at Brean Down; however, the dip is at a different angle to that on Brean Down. On Steep Holm the dip is about 30 degrees to the north whereas at Brean Down it is 30 degrees to the south. There are some folds and fractures with dip angles up to 75 degrees created during the final phases of the Variscan orogeny near the end of the Carboniferous Period, 300 million years ago.

The island rises to about 200 feet (61 m) from the surrounding sea and covers 49 acres (20 ha) at high tide, whereas at low tide it expands to 63 acres (25 ha) due to the tidal range of 43 feet (13 m), second only to the Bay of Fundy in Eastern Canada. There are many caves on the island, and pot holes up to 60 metres (200 ft) deep in the surrounding sea bed that are believed to be the remnants of collapsed cave systems. The caves on the islands cliffs are at two different levels: the caves in the current inter-tidal zone which are below the water table and are producing stalactites, and many others high up on the cliffs that were on the water line many thousands of years ago.

Steep Holm is protected as a nature reserve and Site of Special Scientific Interest (SSSI), notification having taken place in 1952. There is a large bird population, particularly European herring gulls (Larus argentatus) and lesser black-backed gulls (Larus fuscus). There has also been a small population of muntjac deer. The plateau at the top of the island has a layer of soil between 6 inches (150 mm) and 12 inches (300 mm) deep. It has a red colour from veins of iron in the rock and has arrived as sand particles less than 0.0039 inches (0.099 mm) in diameter. The island is the only site in the UK on which wild peonies (Paeonia mascula) grow, although these have been damaged by the fungus botrytis. The wild peony was introduced to the island of Steep Holm, possibly by monks, or brought from the Mediterranean by the Romans. Alexanders (Smyrnium olusatrum) is also common along with golden samphire, buck's-horn plantain (Plantago coronopus) and wild leeks (Allium ampeloprasum). The only reptiles on the island are slowworms (Anguis fragilis).

== History ==
=== Prehistoric to Roman ===
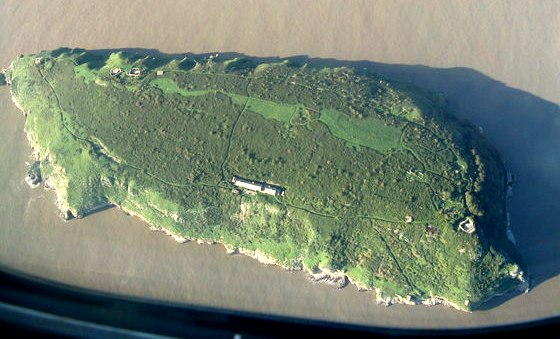
Aerial view of the island

The earliest sign of human activity on the island are prehistoric vertebrae of red deer discovered in Five Johns' Cave during an exploration in 1975. Worked flints from the Mesolithic and scrapers from the Neolithic were uncovered as part of the Priory excavations carried out between 1977 and 1992.

Roman remains, possibly a signal station or watchtower, have been identified on the island by an electrical resistance survey. Accurate exploration and interpretation of the site is difficult as it was reused by builders in both the Victorian era and during World War II. A carved stone head found on the island in 1991 is likely to be a Celtic head from the Romano-British era, but may be from the Iron Age. In addition to shards of cooking pots from the Roman era, some luxury items have been identified including Arretine ware, La Tène style brooches, and an amphora dating from between 90 and 140 AD which was made in southern Spain. There have also been shards of Castor ware. Fragments of pottery roofing and box flue tiles have been identified signifying the presence of a heating system and possibly a bath house. Roman coins from the reigns of Claudius Gothicus (268–270) and Tetricus I (271–273) have also been found.

=== Religious foundations ===
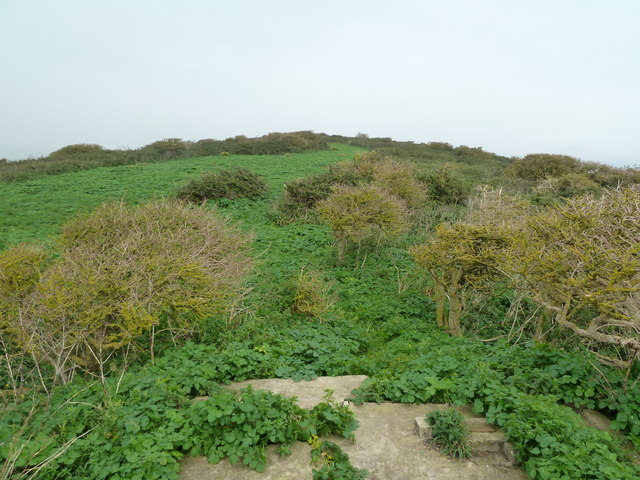
The western plateau

According to legend, first recorded by John Leland in the 16th century, Saint Gildas, the author of De Excidio et Conquestu Britanniae, lived on Steep Holm during the 6th century. He arrived on the island after visiting his friend Saint Cadoc, who lived on Flat Holm as a hermit. Gildas supposedly left the island, after pirates from Orkney carried off his servant and furniture, to become Abbot of Glastonbury. Other semi-legendary saints are also associated with the island; in John Rous's Historia Regum Angliae (c. 1480), Rous claims that Saint Dubricius, the saint said to have crowned Arthur, retired to an hermitage on the island of 'Stepeholm' in the River Severn. The Vikings took refuge on Steep Holm during the summer of 914 and then carried out raids on the coast of Somerset at Watchet and Porlock, according to the Anglo-Saxon Chronicle.

At the end of the 12th century, there was a small priory of Canons Regular of St Michael on the island. The only priory building fully excavated measured 73 feet (22 m) long and 15 feet (4.6 m) wide, with the cloisters and other structures still to be identified. The date of the original foundation of the priory is unclear; however, in the early 13th century the patron was William I de Cantilupe. His family were also patrons of Studley Priory in Warwickshire. His granddaughter married Lord Robert de Tregoz who acquired the freehold of the whole island; however, endowments for the upkeep of the priory were declining, which led to it being abandoned between 1260 and 1265, the monks returning to Studley Priory. A Blue Lias memorial stone from the abbey, which has a Cross of Lorraine, was found in 1867 during the fortification of the island. It was incorporated into an armoury leading to the naming of the "tombstone battery".

=== Manorial ownership ===
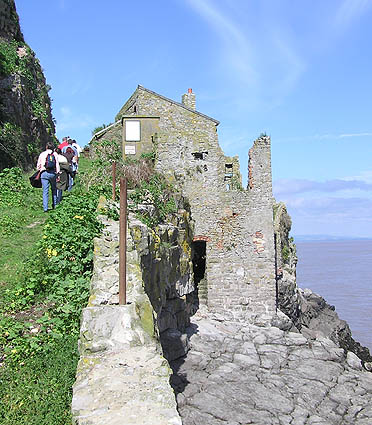
The ruins of the old inn

The island seems to have been held, in association with the local manors of Uphill and Christon, by the Bek family, who granted it to Henry de Lacy, 3rd Earl of Lincoln. Although the mechanism is unclear, it next passed to the Berkeley family with Maurice de Berkeley, the second Baron Berkeley, holding it in 1315. The site was used again by warreners in the 14th and 15th centuries. They lived in one of the ruined priory buildings which was rebuilt.

By 1453 the overlordship of the island was held by James Butler, 5th Earl of Ormond, and in 1460 the advowson was exercised by Margaret Talbot, Countess of Shrewsbury. Margaret Talbot (née de Beauchamp) was a distant cousin of James Butler as both were descended from different sons of Thomas de Beauchamp, 11th Earl of Warwick. In other words, James Butler (via his mother Joan Butler, Countess of Ormond (née Beauchamp) and his grandfather William Beauchamp, 1st Baron Bergavenny, whilst Margaret Talbot was daughter of Elizabeth de Beauchamp (née Berkeley) and the granddaughter of Thomas de Beauchamp, 12th Earl of Warwick. In short, James Butler's and Margaret Talbot's de Beauchamp grandparents were brothers. Of note is that Margaret Talbot was the daughter of Elizabeth Berkeley, Countess of Warwick (and her husband Richard de Beauchamp, 13th Earl of Warwick) from which discord in the Berkeley family was to emerge (see below). Furthermore, Elizabeth Berkeley was the only daughter of Thomas de Berkeley, 5th Baron Berkeley, showing that ownership still resided to some extent in the Berkeley family since Maurice de Berkeley took over the island in 1315 – Margaret Talbot was the great, great, great-granddaughter of Maurice de Berkeley.

However, in the years following, the ownership of a variety of estates, including Norton Beauchamp, to which Steep Holm was attached, was disputed. At the heart of this was the dispute from how the Barony was passed on from Thomas Berkeley, the 5th Baron. These disputes had on one side James Berkeley, 1st Baron Berkeley, also known as 'James the Just' (not to be confused with the other 1st Baron Berkeley Thomas de Berkeley, 1st Baron Berkeley who pre-dated him by 150 years). Yet it was to James whom the Barony transferred to under a new creation by writ since his uncle, the aforementioned Thomas de Berkeley (5th Baron) had no male heirs even though he had named his only daughter (Elizabeth Berkeley) as his heir. This was to be the start of a longstanding legal dispute.

On one side of the dispute originating through the line of James, the new 1st Baron, continued through his son (Sir) William de Berkeley, 1st Marquess of Berkeley in 1463, who was the first male issue from his 3rd marriage to Lady Isabel de Mowbray. This was after two previous marriages that yielded no children. On the opposing side of dispute were the descendants of the aforementioned Elizabeth Berkeley (James' the 1st Baron's, 1st cousin) and in particular through her daughter Margaret (de Beauchamp) that shows some curious tangled sub-plots.

One such sub-plot lies with John Talbot, 1st Earl of Shrewsbury who took Margaret de Beauchamp as his 2nd wife. His first marriage, to a Maud Neville (the daughter of his stepfather Thomas Neville, a Baron Furnivall) and which produced Lady Joan Talbot, amongst 6 children is however notable. The same John Talbot seemingly kidnapped and imprisoned until their death in 1452, the 3rd wife of James Berkeley (the 1st Baron) and mother of the aforementioned 2nd Baron Berkeley (Sir William de Berkeley). Yet, this James Berkeley, took a 4th wife, Lady Joan Talbot (i.e. the daughter of John Talbot who kidnapped his 3rd wife!).

A further sub-plot, or extension of the previous one, centres again around John Talbot but this time as a result of his marriage to Margaret de Beauchamp. Their eldest son, John Talbot, 1st Baron of Lisle and 1st Viscount Lisle, was the father of Thomas Talbot, 2nd Baron of Lisle and 2nd Viscount Lisle. This Thomas Talbot sought to exert his claim on the lands of Baron Berkeley on the death of his grandmother Margaret de Beauchamp (daughter of the disenfranchised Elizabeth Berkeley), who in the interim had continued to press her claim to Baron Berkeley lands against James Berkeley the 1st Baron. It brought him into direct opposition with Sir William de Berkeley (2nd Baron and son of James Berkeley and came to a full head at the Battle of Nibley Green (1470), following what is described as Thomas Talbot's impetuous challenge to Sir William, which had concluded by the end of the following day with the death of Thomas Talbot and the subsequent sacking of his Manor at Wotton-under-Edge.

In the 16th century Edward Seymour, 1st Duke of Somerset and brother of Jane Seymour (3rd wife Henry VIII) took over, and then lost, large estates including Brean, to which Steep Holm was allied. The marriage of his sister Jane and Henry VIII in 1536 coincided with him being made Viscount Beauchamp, potentially linking back to ancestral marriage between Sir Roger Seymour (c.1308 – Before 1366), who married Cicely, the eldest sister and heir of John de Beauchamp, 3rd Baron Beauchamp. This may be related to the feudal Barony of Hatch Beauchamp, Somerset, previously held by his father Sir John Seymour.

The Seymour descendants recovered the estates, owning them into the 17th century, although the only activity on Steep Holm seems to have been the employment of gull watchers and fishermen. In 1684 the Norton Beauchamp estate (possibly in Kewstoke, Somerset, near Sand Bay, north of Weston-Super-Mare) was sold to Edward Ryder. It appears to have been auctioned by decree of the Court of Chancery 11 years later in 1695, possibly because of difficulties in maintaining sea defenses along the Somerset coast; however, this seems to have been disputed in the light of outstanding mortgages. In 1699 the estates, including Steep Holm, were sold to Philip Freke of Bristol, whose descendants held it for the next 130 years. Freke's granddaughter married into the family of John Willes, who was Chief Justice of the Court of Common Pleas and Member of Parliament. During their ownership, probably around 1776, a new cottage was built on Steep Holm for fishermen. It was built using stones from the ruined priory. In 1830 the island was sold again, according to some sources this was to a cousin of John Freke Willes named William Willes; however, other sources suggest it was to a solicitor in Weston-super-Mare named John Baker.

In 1832 the island was leased to Colonel Tynte of Halswell House, who established an inn for sailors. The inn was run by the Harris family, using rum and tobacco bought from ships. They claimed that the island was outside the jurisdiction of the excise men until a court case in 1884. After the Harris family, the inn was run by Mr W. L. Davies, who offered fishing, shooting and boating holidays. To make landing on the island easier, a new pier was built close to the inn. In 1835 clergyman John Ashley from Clevedon voluntarily ministered to the population of the island and the neighbouring Flat Holm. Ashley created the Bristol Channel Mission in order to serve seafarers on the 400 sailing vessels which used the Bristol Channel. The mission would later become the Mission to Seafarers, which still provides ministerial services to sailors in over 300 ports.

=== Palmerston Fort ===
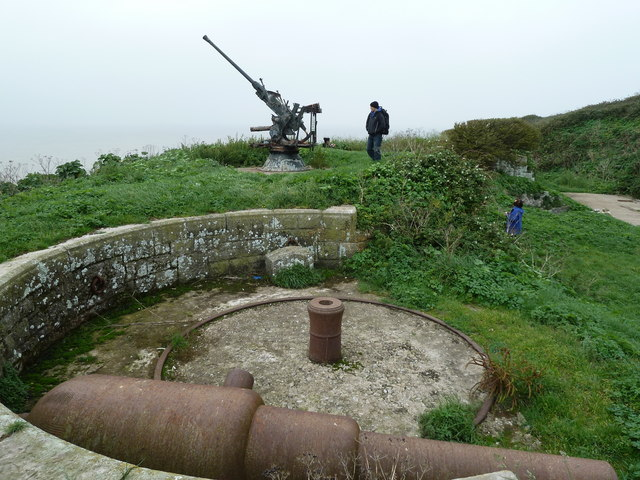
Split Rock Battery

Both Steep Holm and Flat Holm were fortified in the 1860s as a defence against invasion. They form part of a line of defences, known as Palmerston Forts, built across the channel to protect the approaches to Bristol and Cardiff. The island was fortified following a visit by Queen Victoria and Prince Albert to France, where they had been concerned at the strength of the French Navy. The Royal Commission on the Defence of the United Kingdom, under the direction of Lord Palmerston, recommended fortification of the coast, and the island formed part of this strategic coastal defence system. Construction began in 1865 and was completed in 1869 by John Perry of Weston-super-Mare. The work involved the creation of a perimeter road around the summit plateau and a lime kiln for the manufacture of lime mortar to build the barracks and gun emplacements with their ammunition stores.

The concrete gun emplacements were called Summit Battery, Laboratory Battery, Garden Battery and Tombstone Battery. Along with the barracks they have been designated as Grade II listed buildings. The facilities installed included a master-gunners house, a small inn, and a water tank holding 49,000 imperial gallons (220,000 L; 59,000 US gal) of rainwater. The water tank is beneath the barracks and collects rainwater from its roof. The brick tank is 16.7 metres (55 ft) long, 4.8 metres (16 ft) wide and 4.5 metres (15 ft) high with a vaulted roof. Armaments included ten 7-inch rifled muzzle loaders Mk III spread between six batteries. These were later replaced with Armstrong 6-inch RML guns.

Some of the gun batteries are scheduled monuments, and there are the remains of a centralised group of brick-built barrack blocks. In 1898 test firing by HMS Arrogant, an Arrogant-class cruiser, on Rudder Rock battery showed that the fixed gun emplacements used on Steep Holm and other sites were susceptible to attack by modern warships, and the site was no longer active. The military control on the island was maintained until 1908 when it was leased to James Sleeman and his family. In 1927 the first test of the RAE Larynx (from "Long Range Gun with Lynx engine") an early pilotless aircraft, to be used as a guided anti-ship weapon, took place just off Steep Holm.

=== World wars ===
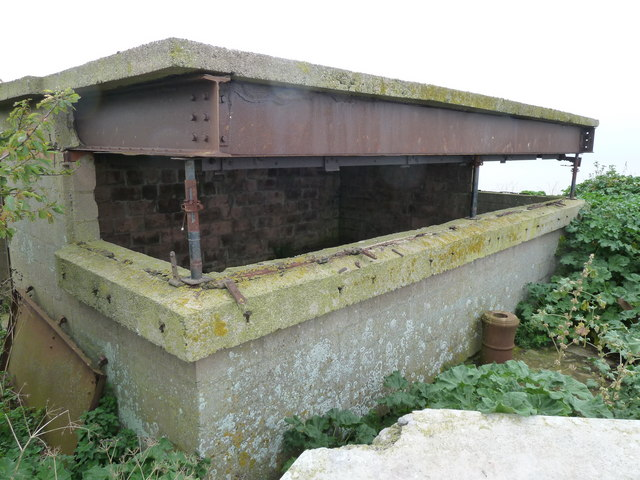
World War II observation post at Rudder Rock

These facilities were updated in both World War I and World War II. From 1915 to 1919 the island was requisitioned by the Admiralty as a coastguard station. After the war the Sleemans returned to carry out farming and fishing and played host to occasional tourists. In World War II, searchlight batteries were built on Steep Holm. In 1940 the island's warden, Harry Cox, who had developed the island into a bird sanctuary since 1931, was appointed as a coastguard and was supported by Local Defence Volunteers from Weston-super-Mare.

In 1940 and 1941 the battery was refortified by soldiers from the Indian Army Service Corps using mules to transport guns and equipment up the steep cliffs. The armament included Mark VII 6-inch breech-loading guns taken from World War I naval vessels which had been scrapped, and also included Lewis automatic machine guns against air attack. The Garden Battery was built over two Victorian stone gun emplacements. Engineers from the Royal Pioneer Corps improved the infrastructure including importing sheep to feed the soldiers and, after a case of typhoid fever, shipping drinking water from south Wales.

To enable the movement of equipment, the engineers built a new jetty. This was linked to the plateau with a cable-operated winched switchback railway using prefabricated 60 centimetres (24 in) gauge lines which had been captured from the Germans in World War I. The Steep Holm batteries were also connected, by underwater telegraph cable, to the Brean Down Fort batteries, but parts of the cable were stolen for scrap after the end of World War II.

=== Post war ===
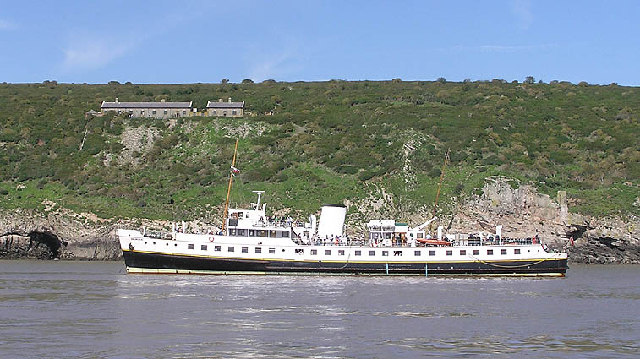
MV Balmoral in front of the old barracks

In 1953 the island was leased by the Steep Holm Trust supported by four local organisations: the Somerset Archaeological and Natural History Society, Bristol Naturalists Society, Mid-Somerset Naturalists and the Bristol Folk House Archaeological Club. They repaired some of the buildings and established a bird ringing programme. In 1974 their lease expired and was taken over by the Kenneth Allsop Memorial Trust, a registered charity formed in memory of the broadcaster and naturalist Kenneth Allsop. The Trust purchased the island in 1976. The mission statement of the Trust is: "To protect, preserve and enhance for the benefit of the public the landscape, antiquities, flora, fauna, natural beauty and scientific interest of the island of Steep Holm in the County of North Somerset and to advance the education of the public in the natural sciences."

Visits can be made to the island. The trust runs day-long boat trips from Weston-super-Mare. One barrack block is in use to provide visitor facilities.

Steep Holm is prominent in the 1978 television film version of L. P. Hartley's story 'The Island' with John Hurt and Charles Gray (an episode of Classics Dark and Dangerous).

In 1980 the Bollywood film Shaan was set and partially filmed on the island.

The island is the focal point of the 2018 crime thriller Arcam, by Jason Minick.

== Bibliography ==
- Atthill, Robin (1976). Mendip: A new study. David & Charles. ISBN 978-0715372975.
- Brown, Donald (1999). Somerset v Hitler: Secret Operations in the Mendips, 1939–45. Countryside Books. ISBN 978-1853065903.
- Clay, Rotha Mary (1914). "The Hermits and Anchorites of England" (PDF). Methuen & Co. London. p. 9.
- Chan, Marjorie A.; Archer, Allen William (2003). Extreme Depositional Environments: Mega End Members in Geologic Time. Boulder, Colorado: Geological Society of America. ISBN 978-0813723709.
- Coysh, A. W.; Mason, E. J.; Waite, V. (1977). The Mendips (4 ed.). Robert Hale. ASIN B00AXGVL1I.
- Farr, Grahame (1954). Somerset Harbours. London: Christopher Johnson.
- Holland, Julian (2010). Amazing & Extraordinary Railway Facts. David & Charles. ISBN 9780715334294.
- Payne, John (2011). The West Country: A Cultural History. Andrews UK Limited. ISBN 9781908493514.
- Phillips, Alan (2013). Castles and Fortifications of Wales. Amberley Publishing Limited. ISBN 9781445624846.
- Legg, Rodney (1989). Steep Holm Wild Life. Dorset Publishing Company. ISBN 978-0948699115.
- Legg, Rodney (1991). Steep Holm at War. Dorset Publishing Company. ISBN 978-0948699603.
- Legg, Rodney (1992). Steep holm Allsop Island. Wincanton Press. ISBN 978-0948699610.
- Legg, Rodney (1993). Steep Holm Legends and History. Dorset Publishing Company. ISBN 978-0948699597.
- Legg, Rodney (1995). Steep Holm Guide (2 ed.). Dorset Publishing Company. ISBN 978-0948699498.
- Murphy, Peter (2009). The English Coast: A History and a Prospect. A&C Black. ISBN 9781847251435.
- Rendell, Stan; Rendell, Joan (1993). Steep Holm: The Story of A Small Island. Sutton Publishing Ltd. ISBN 978-0750903233.
- Rutter, John (1829). Delineations of the north western division of the county of Somerset. G. Olms. p. 95. "flat holm saint cadoc."
- Saunders, A. (2000). Guns Across the Severn. Royal Commission on the Ancient and Historical Monuments of Wales. ISBN 9781871184259.
- Smith, Howard (2006). Steep Holm Diary. Garret Press Somerset. ISBN 978-0954154660.
- Toulson, Shirley (1984). The Mendip Hills: A Threatened Landscape. Victor Gollancz Ltd. ISBN 978-0-575-03453-2.
- van der Bijl, Nicholas (2000). Brean Down Fort: Its History and the Defences of the Bristol Channel. Cossington: Hawk Editions. ISBN 978-0-9529081-7-3.
- Minick, Jason (2018). Arcam. J.Minick Books. ISBN 978-1999662004.
