= Bek =

Bek or BEK may refer to:

== People ==
- Khagan Bek, the title of the king of the Khazars
- Beck (Bek David Campbell; born 1970), Beck Hansen, American singer, songwriter, and musician
- Bek (sculptor) or Bak, an ancient Egyptian sculptor
- Bruce Eric Kaplan (born 1964), The New Yorker cartoonist known as BEK

== Others ==
- Bek (family)
- Bek (crater), on Mercury
- Bek Air, airline in Kazakhstan
- Bekasi Barat LRT station, a light rail station in Jakarta, Indonesia
- Bek, an alternative spelling of Bey, a title of Turko-Mongol origin meaning chief or commander
- BEK, one of the identifying symbols for Fibroblast growth factor receptor 2

== See also ==
- Bec (disambiguation)
- Beck (disambiguation)
