= Becc =

Becc or BECC may refer to:

- Becc., botanical author abbreviation for Odoardo Beccari
- Border Environment Cooperation Commission of Mexico
- British Estonian Chamber of Commerce

== People named Becc ==
- Bécc Bairrche mac Blathmaic (died 718), king of Ulaid in Ireland
- Bécc mac Airemóin (died 893), king of Ulaid in Ireland
- Crónán Becc, an 8th-century Abbot of Clonmacnoise

== See also ==
- BECCS, acronym for Bio-energy with carbon capture and storage
- Bec (disambiguation)
