= Becks =

Becks may refer to:

== People ==
- Becks (surname), a European surname
- David Beckham, English footballer

== Other uses ==
- Becks (film), a 2017 American film
- Becks, New Zealand
- Beck's Brewery, a brewery in Bremen, Germany

== See also ==
- Beck (disambiguation)
- Becs (disambiguation)
- Bex (disambiguation)
