= Beck (disambiguation) =

Beck (born 1970) is an American singer and record producer.

Beck may also refer to:

== Arts and entertainment ==
- Beck (film), a 1997 film
- Beck (Swedish TV series)
- Beck (British TV series)
- Beck (album), a 1975 album by Joe Beck
- Beck (EP), a 2001 EP by Beck
- Beck (manga), a Japanese manga series, or its anime adaptation Beck: Mongolian Chop Squad

== People ==
- Beck (surname), including a list of people with the name
- Beck baronets, an extinct title in the Baronetage of Great Britain
- Beck (Mongolian singer)
- Beck Bennett (born 1984), American actor, writer, and comedian
- Beck Cole, Australian filmmaker
- Beck A. Taylor (fl. 2000s), American university president
- Beck Weathers (born 1946), American pathologist and survivor of the 1996 Mount Everest disaster
- Günther Beck von Mannagetta und Lerchenau, botanist with the standard author abbreviation Beck

== Fictional characters ==
- Beck Oliver, a character from Nickelodeon's Victorious, portrayed by Canadian actor Avan Jogia
- Beck (Tron), the main protagonist of Tron: Uprising, voiced by Elijah Wood

== Places ==
- Beck, Alabama, U.S.
- River Beck, in south London, England

== Other uses ==
- Beck (bus maker), an American bus manufacturer
- Beck (stream), a small stream
- Beck Book Company (Beck's), forerunner of Wakefield Press, Adelaide, South Australia
- Beck Motorsports, an American auto racing team
- Beck Theatre, a theatre in London, England

== See also ==
- Bec (disambiguation)
- Becks (disambiguation)
- Beck's American Translation, a 1976 abbreviated Bible translation
- Beek (disambiguation), Dutch related word
- Bek (disambiguation)
