= Becs =

Becs, Bécs, BeCS, BECS, or BECCS may refer to:

- Bécs, the Hungarian name for Vienna, Austria
- Bio-energy with carbon capture and storage or bio-energy with carbon storage, a future greenhouse-gas mitigation technology
- Bécs (album), a 2014 album by Austrian guitarist and composer Fennesz
- Becs, title character in Dan & Becs, a 2007 Irish comedy television series
- Becs de Bosson, a multi-summited mountain of the Pennine Alps
- Electoral Bloc of Communists and Socialists (Romanian: Blocul electoral al Comuniștilor și Socialiștilor), a political alliance in Moldova

== See also ==
- Becks (disambiguation)
- Bec (disambiguation)
- BEC (disambiguation)
- Bex (disambiguation)
