= BEC =

BEC may refer to:

== Education ==
- Bapatla Engineering College, India
- Basaveshvara Engineering College, India
- Business Environment and Concepts, in the Uniform Certified Public Accountant Examination
- Business and Enterprise College (United Kingdom specialist schools programme), in secondary education
- Breton Education Centre, Nova Scotia, Canada

== Companies and commerce ==
- Bilbao Exhibition Centre, Spain
- Bahamas Electricity Corporation, a government corporation
- BEC (company) (Bandai Entertainment Company), a Japanese video game development company
- Bolinao Electronics Corporation, former name of ABS-CBN Corporation
- British Employers' Confederation, a former employers' association
- Brookville Equipment Corporation, US
- Botswana Examination Council, a provider of national qualifications
- Business Environment Council, Hong Kong
- BEC Recordings
- BEC World, Thai broadcaster and entertainment company

== Science and technology ==
- Battery eliminator circuit, in battery-powered equipment
- Business Email Compromise, in cyber crime
- Bose–Einstein condensate, a state of matter
- Binary erasure channel, in coding theory

== Other uses ==
- Bacon, egg and cheese sandwich
- Basic ecclesial community, a Christian movement
- Bibliothèque de l'École des Chartes, a history journal
- Broad Economic Categories, a three-digit classification
- Business English Certificate, a Cambridge English Language Assessment qualification
- Beech Factory Airport (IATA code), Wichita, Kansas, US
- Bachelor of Economics (BEc)
- Beckenham Hill railway station (station code), London, England

== See also ==
- Bec (disambiguation)
- Bio-energy with carbon capture and storage (BECCS)
