= Lézarde (Seine) =

River in France

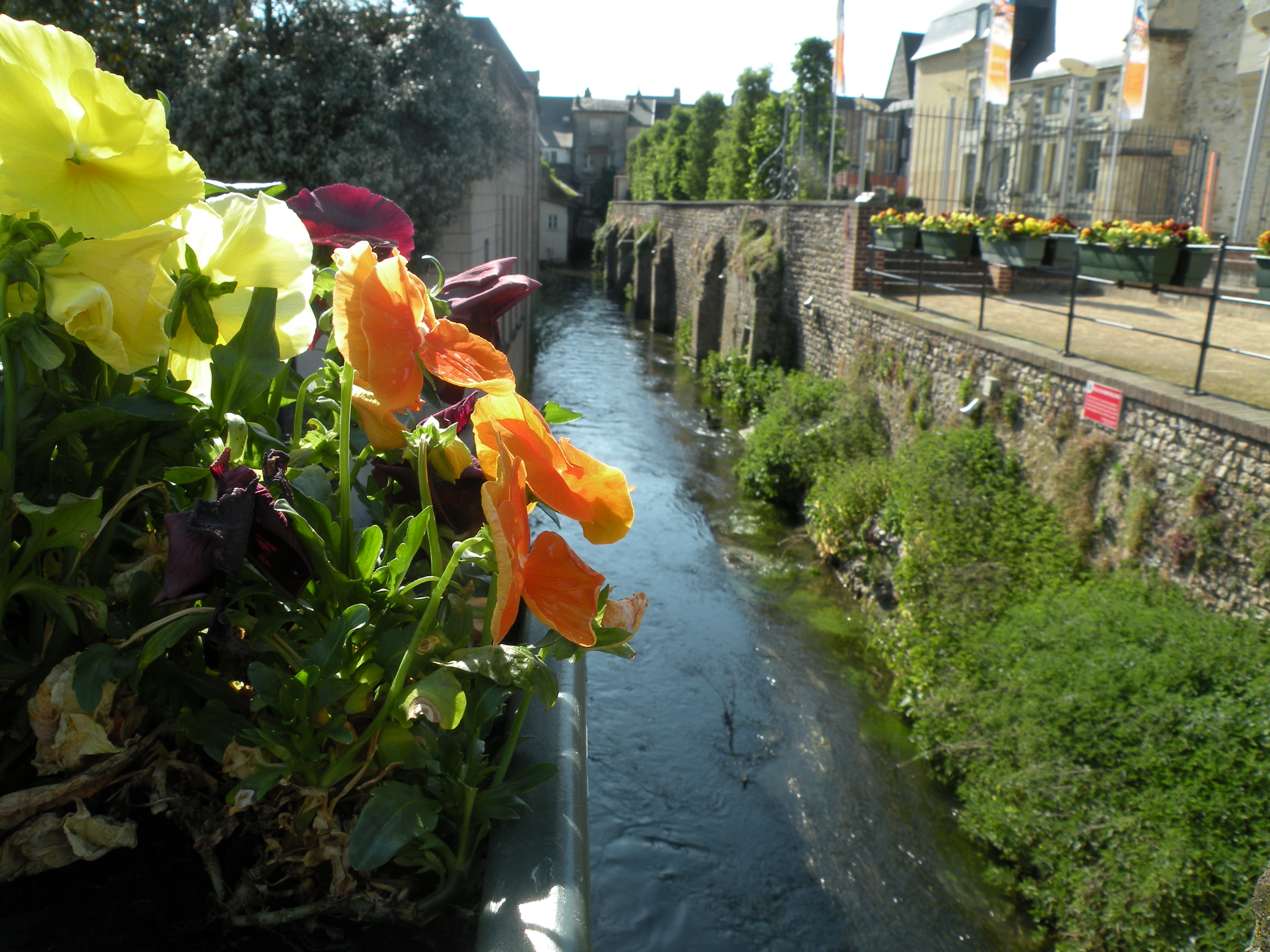
- The Lézarde in Montivilliers

- Location within France Location within Normandy

Location
- Country: France

Physical characteristics
- Source
  - location: Pays de Caux
  - elevation: 106 m (348 ft)
- Mouth: Seine
  - coordinates: 49.4982°N 0.1995°E
- Length: 14.2 km (8.8 mi)
- Basin size: 116 km^{2} (45 sq mi)
- Discharge
  - average: 1.2 m^{3}/s (42 cu ft/s)

Basin features
- Progression: Seine→ English Channel

The river Lézarde is one of the rivers that flow from the plateau of the southern Pays de Caux in the Seine-Maritime département of Normandy into the Seine.
The river rises at Saint-Martin-du-Bec and passes Notre-Dame-du-Bec, Rolleville, Épouville, Montivilliers and joins the Seine at Harfleur. It is 14.2 km (8.8 mi) long.

== Economy ==
In the past, the river was host to many watermills that powered machinery to process both wheat and oil.

== See also ==
- French water management scheme
