= Bec =

Bec may refer to:

== People ==
=== Ancient times ===
- Ailill Flann Bec, medieval Irish dynast
- Anselm of Bec, another name for St Anselm of Canterbury
- Bernard du Bec (died 1149), Benedictine monk and abbot
- Colmán Bec (died c. 587), an Irish king
- Dúnchad Bec, 8th century king of Kintyre, Scotland)
- Óengus mac Colmáin (died 621), Bec, an Irish king
- Theobald of Bec (died 1161), Archbishop of Canterbury

=== Modern times ===
- Bec Goddard (born 1978), former Australian rules football coach
- Bec Hewitt (born 1983), Australian actress and singer
- Bec Rawlings (born 1998), mixed martial artist
- Bec Summerton, Australian film producer
- Pierre Bec (1921–2014), Occitan poet and linguist

== Places and buildings ==
- Bec (placename element), a place-name element common in Normandy, also found in England
- Bec Abbey, a medieval monastery in Normandy, France
- Bec School, a school in London
- Le Bec-Hellouin, a town in Normandy, France

== Other uses ==
- Beag or Bec, a creature in Irish mythology
- Bachelor of Economics (BEc)
- Bec (novel), by Darren Shan; also Bec MacConn, protagonist of the novel

== See also ==
- BEC (disambiguation)
- Beč (disambiguation)
- Becc (disambiguation)
- Beck (disambiguation)
- Becque (disambiguation)
- Becs (disambiguation)
- Bek (disambiguation)
- Rebecca (given name)
