= Scott Beeks =

English footballer (born 1999)

Personal information
- Date of birth: 12 August 1999 (age 27)
- Place of birth: England
- Positions: Midfielder; striker

Youth career
- Chertsey Town
- A.F.C. Aldermaston
- IFK Mariehamn

Senior career*
Years	Team	Apps	(Gls)
	FC Åland	0	(0)
-2019	IFK Mariehamn	5	(0)
- * Club domestic league appearances and goals

Scott Beeks (born 12 August 1999) is an English footballer who is last known to have played as a midfielder or striker for IFK Mariehamn. His father, Steve Beeks, also played professional football. He also plays roundnet for Great Britain.

== Career ==
Beeks started his career with Finnish third division side FC Åland before joining IFK Mariehamn in the Finnish top flight.

He has played college soccer for La Salle University. In the 2020–2021 season, Beeks was named to the Atlantic 10 All Rookie team.
