= Stege and Waidbach =

River in Germany

Stege / Waidbach

Location
- Country: Germany
- State: Mecklenburg-Vorpommern

Physical characteristics
- Mouth
  - location: Mühlenfließ / Beke
  - coordinates: 54.1160°N 11.9167°E / 53.9768°N 12.0129°E

Basin features
- Progression: Mühlenfließ→ Baltic Sea; Beke→ Warnow→ Baltic Sea

Stege and Waidbach are two small rivers in Mecklenburg-Vorpommern, Germany, forming a pseudobifurcation. This means, they are linked by a waterbody that is drained in both directions. The common top section is fed by sources in small valleys at the eastern slope of Kühlung hills. The northern part, Stege, flows into the Mühlenfließ in Bad Doberan. The southern part, Waidbach, flows into the Beke near Ziesendorf.

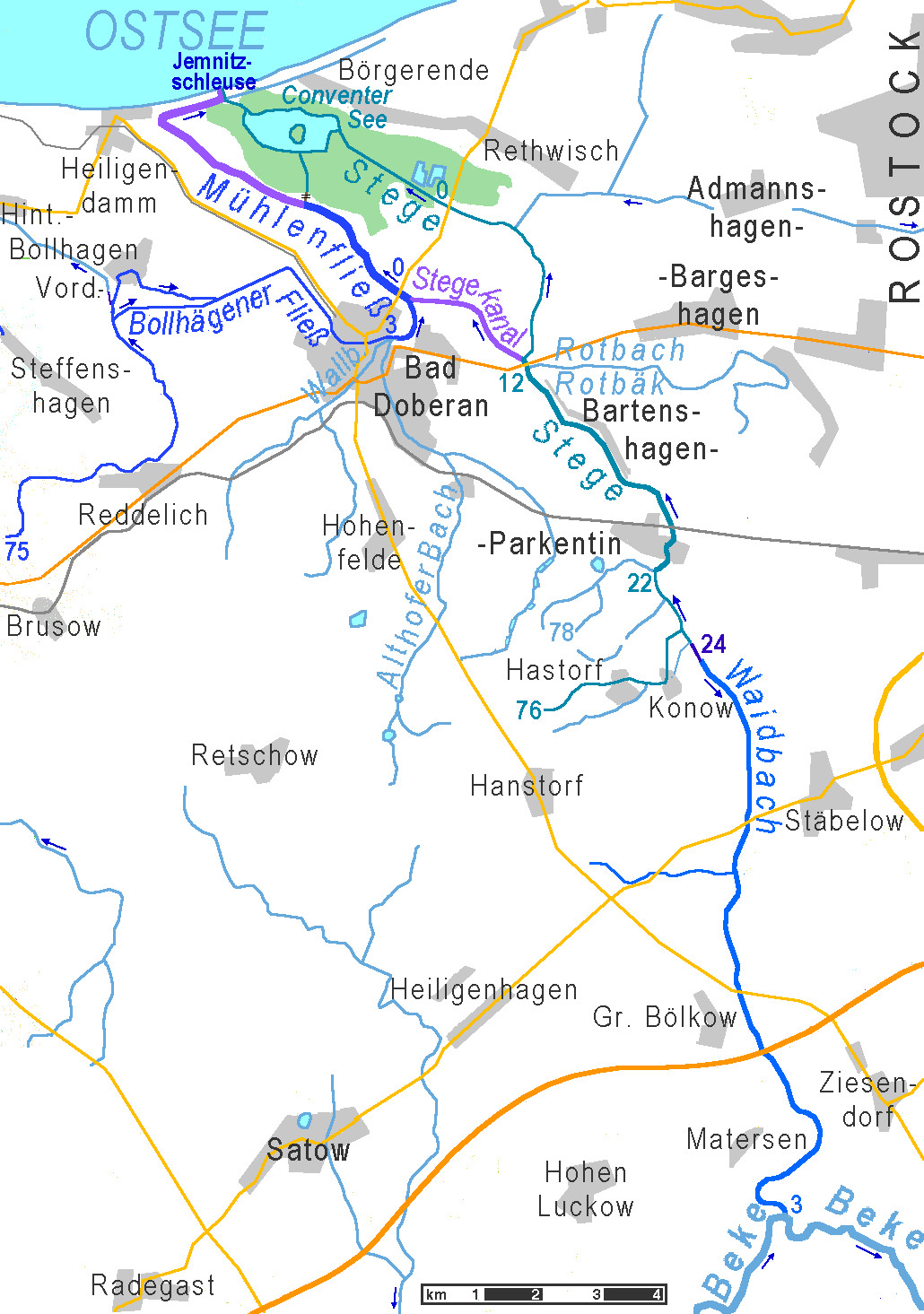
Mühlenfließ, Stege and Waidbach dark lilac: pseudobifurkation lilac: canal built in 1968 green area: below sea level

== See also ==
- List of rivers of Mecklenburg-Vorpommern
