= Beč =

Beč may refer to:

- Beč, Cerknica, a settlement in Slovenia
- Beč, Croatia, a village near Bosiljevo
- Vienna, the capital of Austria, in Serbo-Croatian (Croatian, Bosnian, Serbian, Montenegrin)

== See also ==
- Bec (disambiguation)
