= Épouville =

- Commune
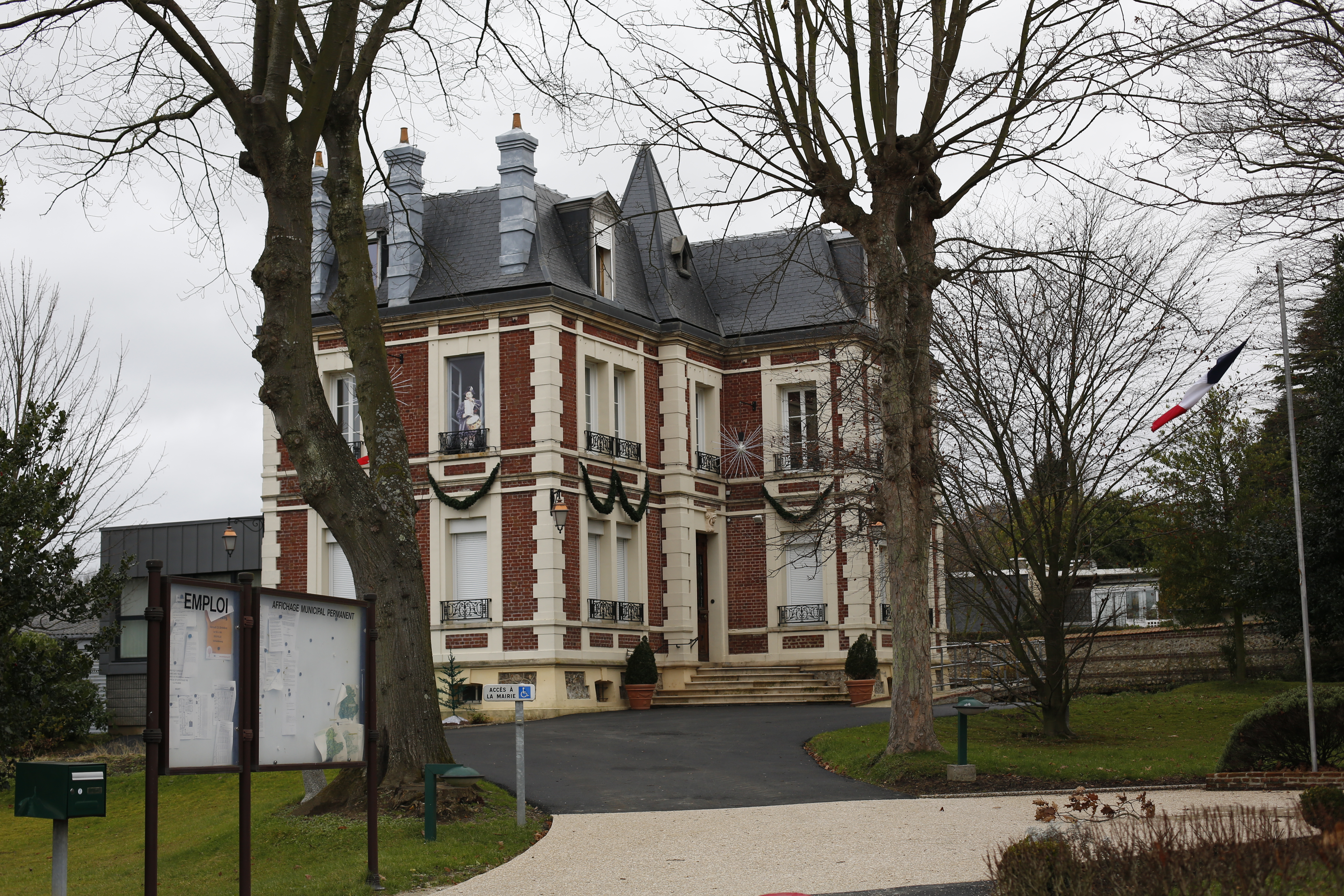
- The town hall in Épouville

- Coat of arms
- Location of Épouville
- Location within France Location within Normandy
- Coordinates: 49°33′47″N 0°13′25″E
- Country: France
- Region: Normandy
- Department: Seine-Maritime
- Arrondissement: Le Havre
- Canton: Octeville-sur-Mer
- Intercommunality: Le Havre Seine Métropole

Government
  - Mayor (2020–2026): Christine Domain
- Area^{1}: 5.59 km^{2} (2.16 sq mi)
- Elevation: 27 m (89 ft)
- Highest elevation: 98 m (322 ft)
- Lowest elevation: 17 m (56 ft)
- Population (2023): 2,601
  - Density: 465/km^{2} (1,210/sq mi)
- Time zone: UTC+01:00 (CET)
  - Summer (DST): UTC+02:00 (CEST)
- INSEE/Postal code: 76238 /76133
- ^{1} French Land Register data, which excludes lakes, ponds, glaciers > 1 km^{2} (0.386 sq mi or 247 acres) and river estuaries.

Épouville (French pronunciation: [epuvil]) is a commune in the Seine-Maritime department in the Normandy region in northern France.

== Geography ==
A light industrial and farming village in the Pays de Caux, situated some 32 miles (51 km) northeast of Le Havre, at the junction of the D925, D52 and D32 roads and by the banks of the river Lézarde.

== Heraldry ==
Arms of Épouville	The arms of Épouville are blazoned : Or, on a chevron gules between 2 mullets of 6 pierced azure and a millwheel argent, a fleur de lys Or, and on a chief azure a lizard argent.

== Population ==
Historical population
Year	Pop.	±% p.a.
1968	1,112	—
1975	1,092	−0.26%
1982	2,644	+13.47%
1990	2,921	+1.25%
1999	2,960	+0.15%
2007	2,823	−0.59%
2012	2,824	+0.01%
2017	2,686	−1.00%
2023	2,601	−0.53%
Source: INSEE

== Places of interest ==
- The church of St. Denis, dating from the twelfth century.
- The sixteenth-century chateau Gray.
- The Coupeauville manorhouse.
- The watermills.
- The town hall.

== See also ==
- Communes of the Seine-Maritime department
