= Saint-Martin-du-Bec =

- Commune
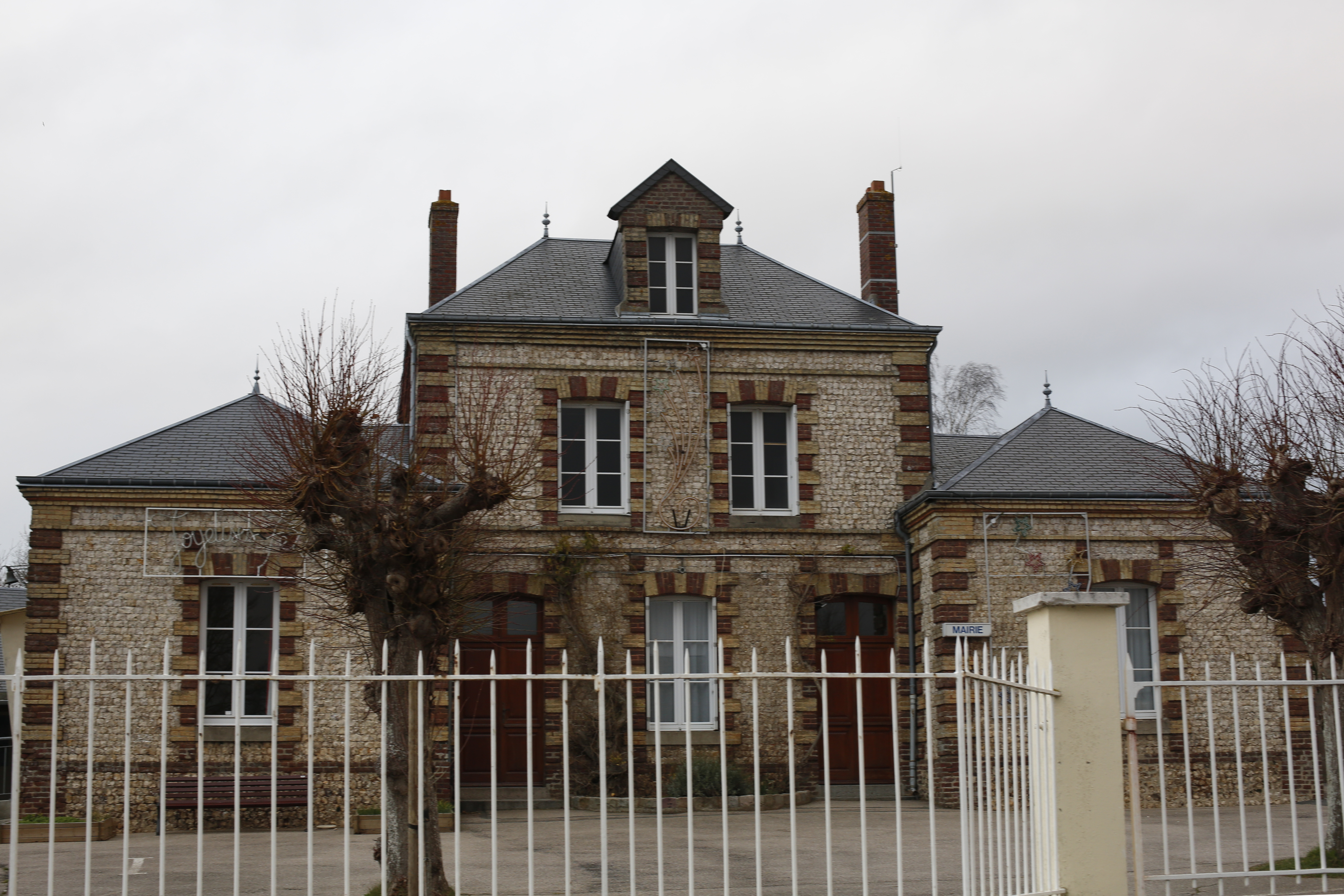
- The town hall in Saint-Martin-du-Bec

- Coat of arms
- Location of Saint-Martin-du-Bec
- Location within France Location within Normandy
- Coordinates: 49°36′11″N 0°12′39″E
- Country: France
- Region: Normandy
- Department: Seine-Maritime
- Arrondissement: Le Havre
- Canton: Octeville-sur-Mer
- Intercommunality: Le Havre Seine Métropole

Government
  - Mayor (2020–2026): Nicolas Simon
- Area^{1}: 4.12 km^{2} (1.59 sq mi)
- Elevation: 80 m (260 ft)
- Highest elevation: 106 m (348 ft)
- Lowest elevation: 44 m (144 ft)
- Population (2023): 650
  - Density: 160/km^{2} (410/sq mi)
- Time zone: UTC+01:00 (CET)
  - Summer (DST): UTC+02:00 (CEST)
- INSEE/Postal code: 76615 /76133
- ^{1} French Land Register data, which excludes lakes, ponds, glaciers > 1 km^{2} (0.386 sq mi or 247 acres) and river estuaries.

Saint-Martin-du-Bec (French pronunciation: [sɛ̃ maʁtɛ̃ dy bɛk]) is a commune in the Seine-Maritime department in the Normandy region in northern France.

== Geography ==
A farming village in the Pays de Caux, situated some 9 miles (14 km) northeast of Le Havre, at the junction of the D32 and D79 roads, by the banks of the river Lézarde.

== Heraldry ==
Arms of Saint-Martin-du-Bec	The arms of Saint-Martin-du-Bec are blazoned : Azure, a leopard in chief 2 crosslets Or, a chief fusilly argent and gules.

== Population ==
Historical population
Year	Pop.	±% p.a.
1968	282	—
1975	313	+1.50%
1982	532	+7.87%
1990	580	+1.09%
1999	619	+0.73%
2007	601	−0.37%
2012	555	−1.58%
2017	609	+1.87%
2023	650	+1.09%
Source: INSEE

== Places of interest ==
- The church of St. Martin, dating from the twelfth century.
- The castle of Bec-Crespin, with a thirteenth-century gate and portcullis.
- Old buildings, parkland and lakes of the castle grounds.

== See also ==
- Communes of the Seine-Maritime department
