= Beag =

One of the Tuatha Dé Danann in Irish mythology

In Irish mythology, Bec (modern Irish Beag, meaning "small") was one of the Tuatha Dé Danann. She was known for having a magic well, that would grant wisdom with one drink and foretelling for a second. The well was guarded by her three daughters. When Fionn mac Cumhaill approached the well to ask for a drink, her daughters tried to prevent him from getting the water; "one of them threw water over him to scare him away and some of it went into his mouth. From the water he gained wisdom."
