= Protein BEX2 =

Protein-coding gene in the species Homo sapiens

BEX2

Identifiers
- Aliases: BEX2, BEX1, DJ79P11.1, brain expressed X-linked 2
- External IDs: OMIM: 300691; MGI: 1338017; GeneCards: BEX2

Gene location (Human)
Chr.	X chromosome (human)
Band	Xq22.2	Start	103,309,346 bp
Band	Xq22.2	End	103,311,007 bp

Gene location (Mouse)
Chr.	X chromosome (mouse)
Band	X F1|X 57.37 cM	Start	134,967,313 bp
Band	X F1|X 57.37 cM	End	134,968,985 bp
RNA expression pattern
Bgee	Human / Mouse (ortholog); Top expressed in: endothelial cell; Brodmann area 23; pons; anterior pituitary; prefrontal cortex; superior vestibular nucleus; nucleus accumbens; middle temporal gyrus; cerebellar vermis; Brodmann area 9 / Top expressed in: arcuate nucleus; ventromedial nucleus; paraventricular nucleus of hypothalamus; temporal lobe; amygdala; dorsomedial hypothalamic nucleus; lateral septal nucleus; anterior amygdaloid area; lateral hypothalamus; median eminence; More reference expression data
BioGPS	n/a
Gene ontology
Molecular function	protein binding
Cellular component	cytoplasm; nucleus
Biological process	regulation of apoptotic process; cell cycle; regulation of cell cycle; apoptotic process
Sources:Amigo / QuickGO
Orthologs
Databases	NCBI: entry; OMA: entry
Species	Human	Mouse
Entrez	84707	12069
Ensembl	ENSG00000133134	ENSMUSG00000042750
UniProt	Q9BXY8	Q9WTZ8
RefSeq (mRNA)	NM_032621; NM_001168399; NM_001168400; NM_001168401	NM_009749
RefSeq (protein)	NP_001161871; NP_001161872; NP_001161873; NP_116010	NP_033879
Location (UCSC)	Chr X: 103.31 – 103.31 Mb	Chr X: 134.97 – 134.97 Mb
PubMed search
- Wikidata
View/Edit Human	View/Edit Mouse

Protein BEX2 also known as brain-expressed X-linked protein 2 is a protein that in humans is encoded by the BEX2 gene. It is exclusively expressed in the pancreas, kidney, liver, adrenal gland and testis. In accordance with cancer stem cell theory, there is a link between BEX2 and dormant cancer stem cells of many different types of cancer.

The exact role of the protein is controversial however there is research that narrows down its effects. In cholangiocarcinoma stem cells, BEX2 suppresses mitochondrial functions through the TUMF protein and BEX2 is degraded by FEM1B-CUL2 E3 ubiquitin ligase complex. A link was found between BEX2 and MMP2 in regard to cancer invasion. Increase of BEX2 expression caused an increase in stem cell development in the liver but loss of BEX2 caused no noticeable abnormalities. BEX2 expression has also protected cells from apoptosis which can contribute to cancerous growth.
