= Protein BEX1 =

Protein-coding gene in the species Homo sapiens

BEX1

Identifiers
- Aliases: BEX1, BEX2, HBEX2, HGR74-h, brain expressed X-linked 1
- External IDs: OMIM: 300690; MGI: 1338017; GeneCards: BEX1

Gene location (Human)
Chr.	X chromosome (human)
Band	Xq22.1|Xq22	Start	103,062,651 bp
Band	Xq22.1|Xq22	End	103,064,171 bp

Gene location (Mouse)
Chr.	X chromosome (mouse)
Band	X F1|X 57.37 cM	Start	134,967,313 bp
Band	X F1|X 57.37 cM	End	134,968,985 bp
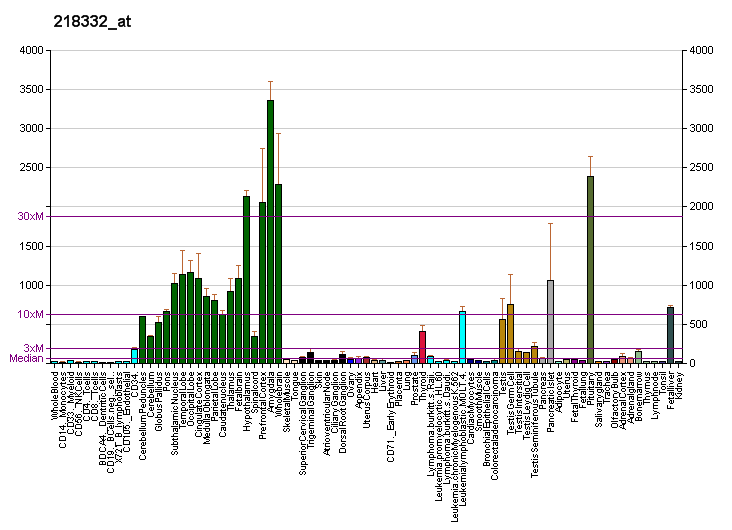
RNA expression pattern
Bgee	Human / Mouse (ortholog); Top expressed in: endothelial cell; Brodmann area 23; middle temporal gyrus; orbitofrontal cortex; primary visual cortex; dorsolateral prefrontal cortex; superior frontal gyrus; Brodmann area 9; prefrontal cortex; pituitary gland / Top expressed in: arcuate nucleus; ventromedial nucleus; paraventricular nucleus of hypothalamus; temporal lobe; amygdala; dorsomedial hypothalamic nucleus; lateral septal nucleus; anterior amygdaloid area; lateral hypothalamus; median eminence; More reference expression data
BioGPS	More reference expression data
Gene ontology
Molecular function	protein binding
Cellular component	cytoplasm; nucleus; transcription regulator complex
Biological process	multicellular organism development; cell differentiation; positive regulation of DNA-binding transcription factor activity; nervous system development; positive regulation of transcription by RNA polymerase II
Sources:Amigo / QuickGO
Orthologs
Databases	NCBI: entry; OMA: entry
Species	Human	Mouse
Entrez	55859	12069
Ensembl	ENSG00000133169	ENSMUSG00000042750
UniProt	Q9HBH7	Q9WTZ8
RefSeq (mRNA)	NM_018476	NM_009749
RefSeq (protein)	NP_060946	NP_033879
Location (UCSC)	Chr X: 103.06 – 103.06 Mb	Chr X: 134.97 – 134.97 Mb
PubMed search
- Wikidata
View/Edit Human	View/Edit Mouse

Protein BEX1 also known as brain-expressed X-linked protein 1 is a protein that in humans is encoded by the BEX1 gene. BEX1 is a part of the BEX gene family well conserved in mammals. It is expressed in a wide range of tissues. BEX proteins have connections to cancer and their direct functions are not fully understood. BEX1 is suggested to act as a tumor suppressant in certain situations.
