= Business Environment Council =

- Type: Non-profit organisation
- Founded: 1992
- Headquarters: 2/F, 77 Tat Chee Avenue, Kowloon Tong, Hong Kong
- Key people: Chairman – Kevin O'Brien; CEO – Simon Ng
- Website: Business Environment Council

Business Environment Council (BEC) (Chinese: 商界環保協會) is a charitable non-profit-making organization established by the Hong Kong business sector to promote environmental sustainability in Hong Kong. BEC has four types of membership, including Council Member, Corporate Member, General Member and Affiliate Member, and most of them are listed companies in Hong Kong. Its current chairman is Kevin O'Brien (Gammon Construction Limited). The Headquarters of BEC is located at 77 Tat Chee Ave, Kowloon Tong. The BEC Building attained the BEAM Plus Platinum Rating for Existing Buildings, the highest achievable green building rating in Hong Kong twice, in October 2017 and January 2023.

== Major programmes ==
EnviroSeries Conference

Staged twice a year, EnviroSeries Conference aims to provide a cross-sector forum to discuss and address key issues related to Hong Kong's environmental sustainability.

Net-zero Carbon Charter

To align with Hong Kong’s 2050 carbon neutrality goal, the rebranded Net-zero Carbon Charter, which was formerly launched as the BEC Low Carbon Charter in March 2019, aims to make a collective effort among businesses and organisations, urging them to set targets and actions for a net-zero future through a pledge. Under the framework of the Charter, BEC designs and hosts events and programmes to guide companies in formulating, executing, and achieving their objectives. As of June 2024, there is a total of 75 Charter Signatories, in which 20 are the Science-aligned Signatories, while the remaining 55 are Action Signatories.

== Major members ==
BEC has four types of membership: Council Member, Corporate Member, General Member and Affiliate Member, and which mainly come from leading listed, multinational or holding companies, large private or government-mandated corporations.

Council Member

- Airport Authority Hong Kong
- Allied Success Technology Development Limited
- Baguio Green Group Limited
- China State Construction Engineering (Hong Kong) Limited
- Chinachem Agencies Ltd
- CLP Power Hong Kong Limited
- Gammon Construction Limited
- Green Island Cement Company Limited
- Hang Lung Properties Limited
- Hang Seng Bank Limited
- Henderson Land Development Co., Ltd.
- Hongkong Land Limited
- Hysan Development Company Limited
- Jardine Engineering Corporation (Representing the Jardine Matheson Group)
- Kerry Properties Limited
- Kum Shing Group Limited
- Link Asset Management Limited
- MF Jebsen International Limited
- Modern Terminals Limited
- New World Development Company Limited
- Orient Overseas Container Line Limited
- PCCW Limited
- Schneider Electric (Hong Kong) Limited
- Shell Hong Kong Limited
- Siemens Energy Limited
- Siemens Limited
- Sino Land Company Limited
- Sun Hung Kai Properties Limited
- Swire Pacific Limited
- Swire Properties Limited
- The Hong Kong and China Gas Company Limited
- The Hong Kong Jockey Club
- The Hongkong & Shanghai Banking Corporation Limited
- The Hongkong Electric Company Limited
- The Kowloon Motor Bus Company (1933) Limited

== Organisational structure ==
=== Board of Directors for 2026 to 2028 ===
Chairman

- Kevin O'Brien (Gammon Construction Limited)

Board Directors

- Peter Lee (Airport Authority Hong Kong)
- Wong Hung Han (Chinachem Group)
- Lena Low (CLP Power Hong Kong Limited)
- Daniel Cheng (Dunwell Enviro-Tech (Holdings) Limited)
- John Chai (Fook Tin Technologies Limited)
- Randy Yu (Henderson Land Development Company Limited)
- Derek Chan (Hongkong Land Limited)
- Noky Wong (Jardine Matheson Group)
- Ivy Lee (Leigh & Orange Limited)
- Horace Lo (Modern Terminals Limited)
- Jonathan Chiu (Schneider Electric (Hong Kong) Limited)
- Anne Yu (Shell Hong Kong Limited)
- Ricky Liu (Siemens Limited)
- Luen Fai Lee (Sun Hung Kai Properties Limited)
- Aaron Sloan (Swire Pacific Limited)
- Patrick Ho (Swire Properties Limited)
- Bien Wong (The Hong Kong and China Gas Company Limited)
- Huifeng Zhang (The Hongkong and Shanghai Banking Corporation Limited)
- Bill Ho (The Hongkong Electric Company, Limited)

=== Management team ===
Chief Executive Officer

- Simon Ng

Director – Finance

- Ivan Chan

Director – Operations

- C.F. Leung

Assistant Director – Communications

- Maggie Lam

Head – Policy & Research

- Merlin Lao

Head – Human Resources & Administration

- Michelle Fung

Head – Membership

- Fanny Li

== See also ==
- 1992 in the environment
