= Beck (bus maker) =

C. D. Beck & Company, of Sidney, Ohio, was an American intercity motorcoach and transit bus manufacturing company that was founded in 1931.

In 1953, Beck acquired Ahrens-Fox Fire Engine Company, maker of fire apparatus and transferred its production from Cincinnati to Sidney. In 1956, Mack Trucks bought Beck and expanded its facility the following year. However, in 1960 the factory was closed and sold to Westinghouse Air Brake.

Total Beck bus and coach production was around 3150 units.
