= Bex Marshall =

British blues musician and songwriter

Bex Marshall is a British blues musician and songwriter based in Crouch End, North London.

== Career ==
Marshall grew up in Devon, and started playing guitar at 11. Aged 18, she began work on cruise liners and working in poker dens in the Netherlands, before moving to Australia. She later cited her extensive travelling as inspiration for songwriting. She began playing live in the 12 Bar Club in London in the early 2000s. She has cited Bonnie Raitt, Janis Joplin and Tina Turner as influences. In 2013, she won the Best British Blues Vocalist poll at the UK Blues Awards. In 2014, she began touring Russia for the first time.

== Musical style ==
Marshall plays a Fender acoustic steel-top resonator guitar. Her guitar playing has been critically praised, particularly the use of slide guitar which has been compared to Bonnie Raitt. She has been the only woman invited to play at the Cork International Guitar Festival. She is particularly keen on regular live performances, saying "If you have a good record then you should make sure you give it a good walk".

== Personal life ==
Marshall was married to Barry Marshall-Everitt, a regular promoter of roots music. He also acted as executive producer to her records. He died in 2017.

== Discography ==
- Kitchen Table (2008)
- The House of Mercy (2012)
- Fortuna (2024)
