= Prinsenbeek =

- Town
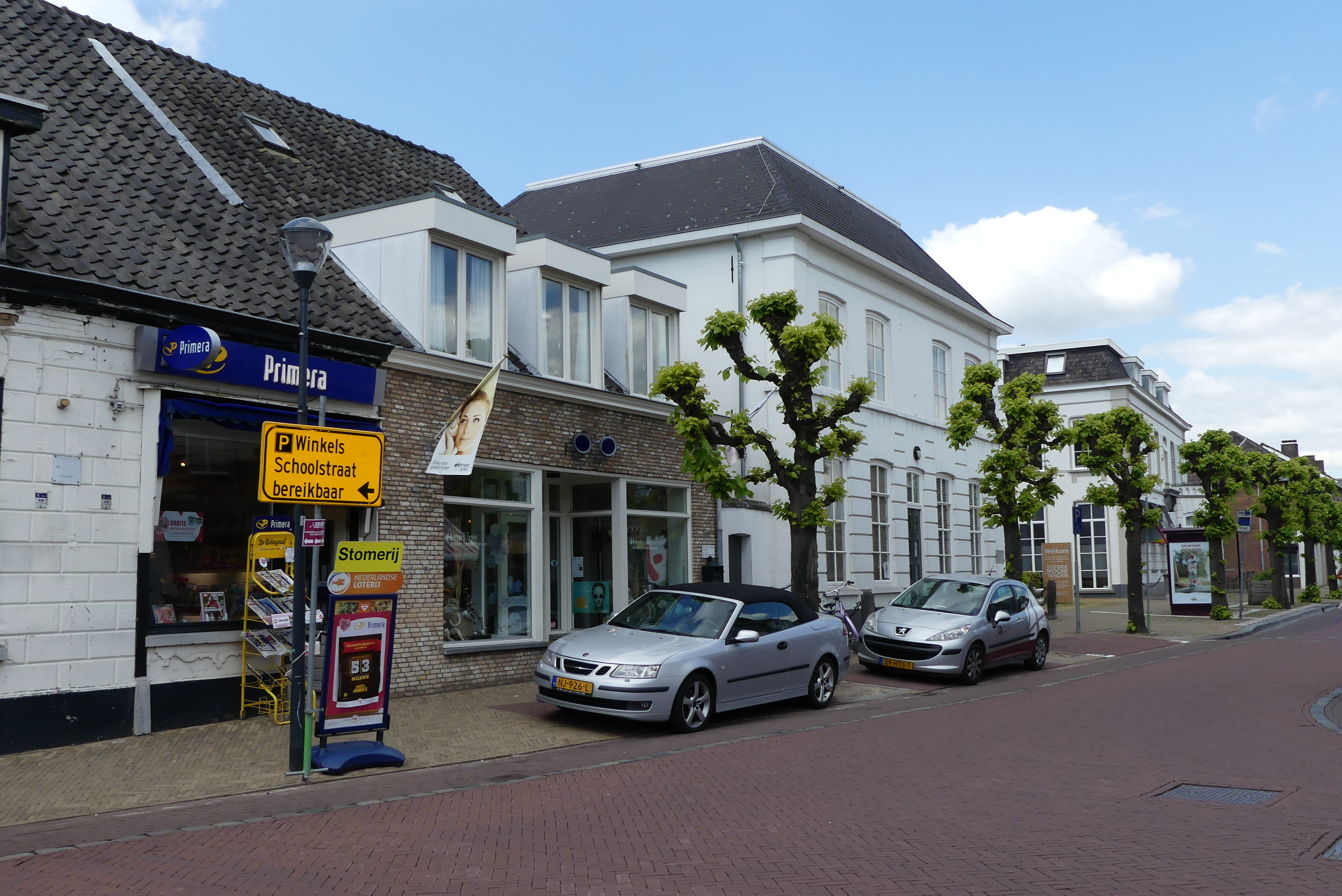
- Street of Prinsenbeek

- Flag Coat of arms

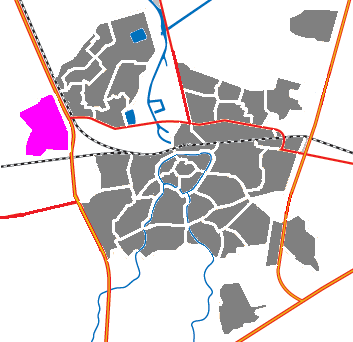

- Location in the province of North Brabant in the Netherlands Prinsenbeek (Netherlands)
- Coordinates: 51°36′N 4°43′E
- Country: Netherlands
- Province: North Brabant
- Municipality: Breda

Area
  - Total: 17.11 km^{2} (6.61 sq mi)
- Elevation: 4 m (13 ft)

Population (2025)
  - Total: 12,365
  - Density: 722.7/km^{2} (1,872/sq mi)
- Time zone: UTC+1 (CET)
  - Summer (DST): UTC+2 (CEST)
- Postal code: 4841
- Dialing code: 076

Prinsenbeek is a village and a former municipality in the Dutch province North Brabant. The village is situated west of the motorway A16 (Rotterdam–Antwerp) and the TGV line Amsterdam–Paris. Prinsenbeek is a part of the municipality Breda, and it has 12,365 inhabitants (2025). There is a train station on the line Rotterdam–Breda. During the carnival, Prinsenbeek is called Boemeldonck (slowtrainswamp).

== History ==
Initially, the village was called Beek. The Prinsenhoeve (princes' farm) at Beek was built in the 14th century, and that is the first mention of this village. Beek became a parish in 1796. On 1 July 1866 the train station Prinsenbeek was opened.

The municipality Beek was founded in 1942, during World War II, when the town Princenhage was added to the town Breda. The village, with a church, became a separate municipality. In 1951 the name was changed into Prinsenbeek, because there were several more towns called Beek, one in Limburg and one in Gelderland. By royal decree Prinsenbeek was given a town arms on 12 January 1951 and on 11 October 1963 the town council decided to have a town flag. On 1 July 1976 the area east of the railway was added to Breda to construct the district of Haagse Beemden. Finally at the municipal redivision on 1 January 1997 Prinsenbeek was added to Breda.

== Buildings ==
Prinsenbeek has some civil monuments. The pump at the Markt is a reconstruction from 1975 of the pump from 1874, which was destroyed in 1935.

The Mariachapel was built in 1953, and renamed in 1980 into 'Chapel of Peace', in remembrance of the people who died in the second World War.

The church, built on the Market square.

A sculpture of a slowtrain, which was used to drive on the railroad.

== Transportation ==
Bus 373 connects Prinsenbeek with Breda railway station and Zevenbergen. Bus 216 connects Prinsenbeek with Etten-Leur.

== Education and recreation ==
There are 3 schools in Prinsenbeek; De Griffioen, De Horizon and a Montessori school.

At the eastern part of Prinsenbeek near the A16, there is a park called Overbos, stretching for over a kilometer parallel with the highway.

There is a football club at the Heikantsestraat named Beek Vooruit.

== Gallery ==
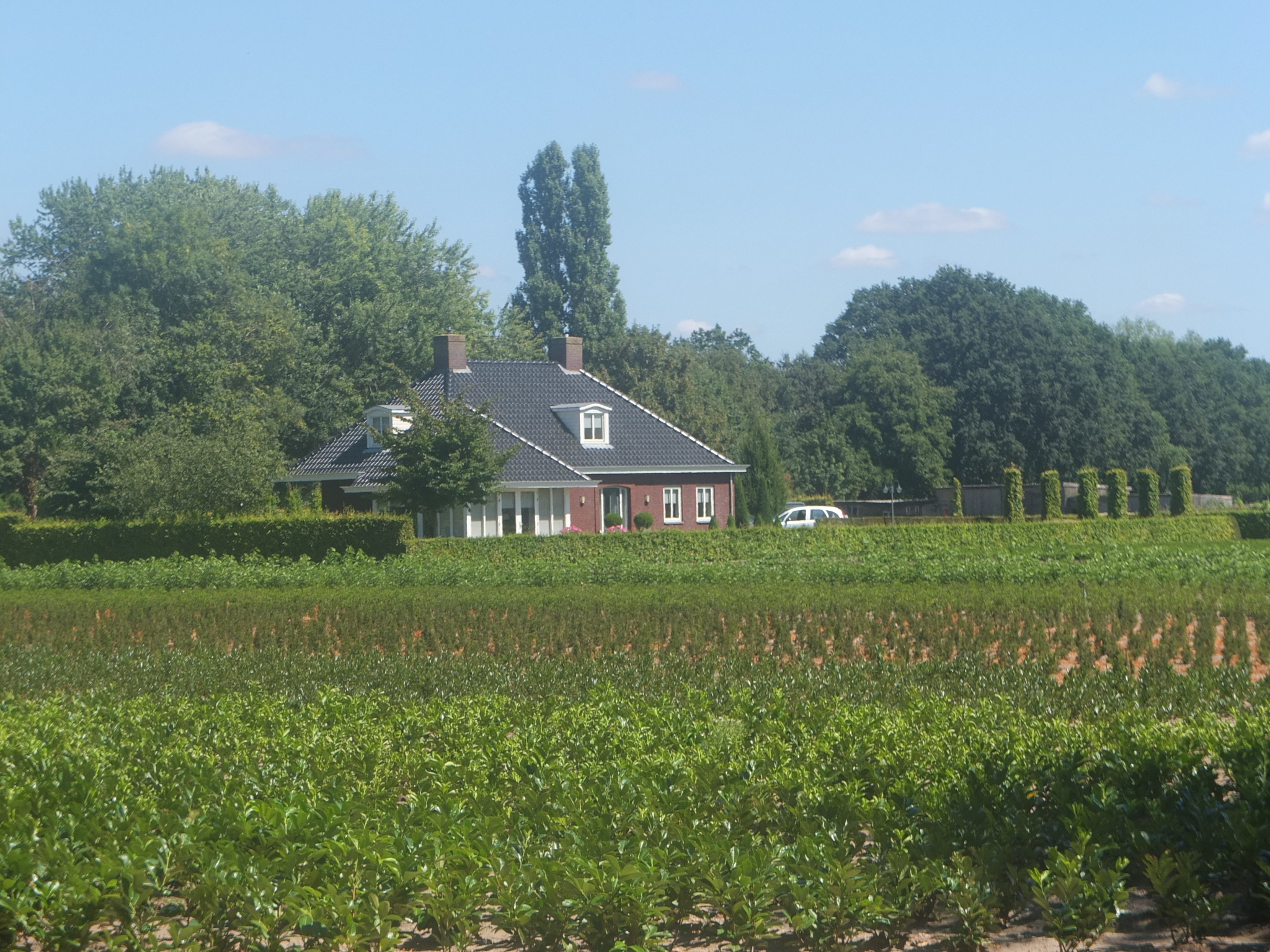
Farm in Prinsenbeek

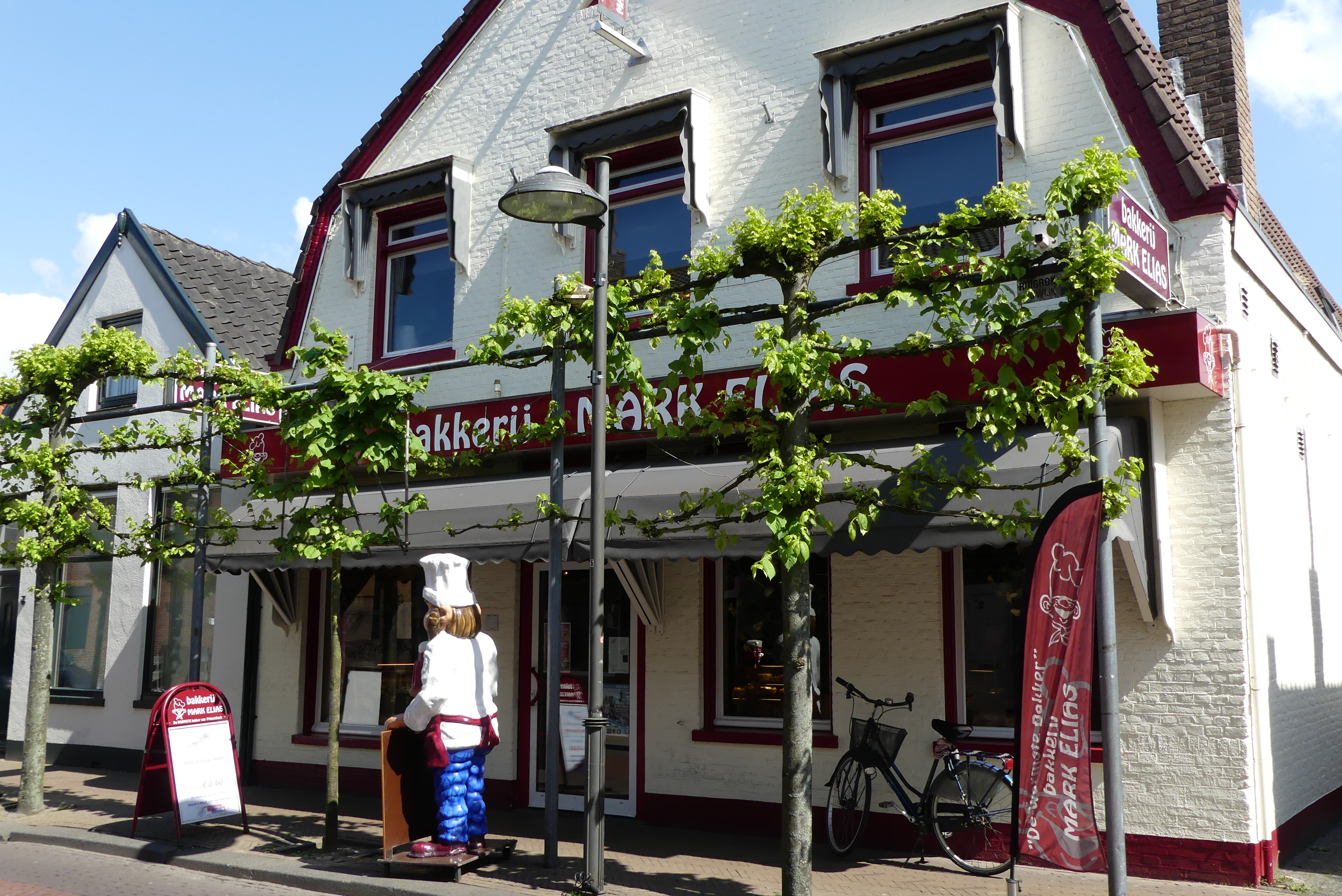
Bakery in Prinsenbeek

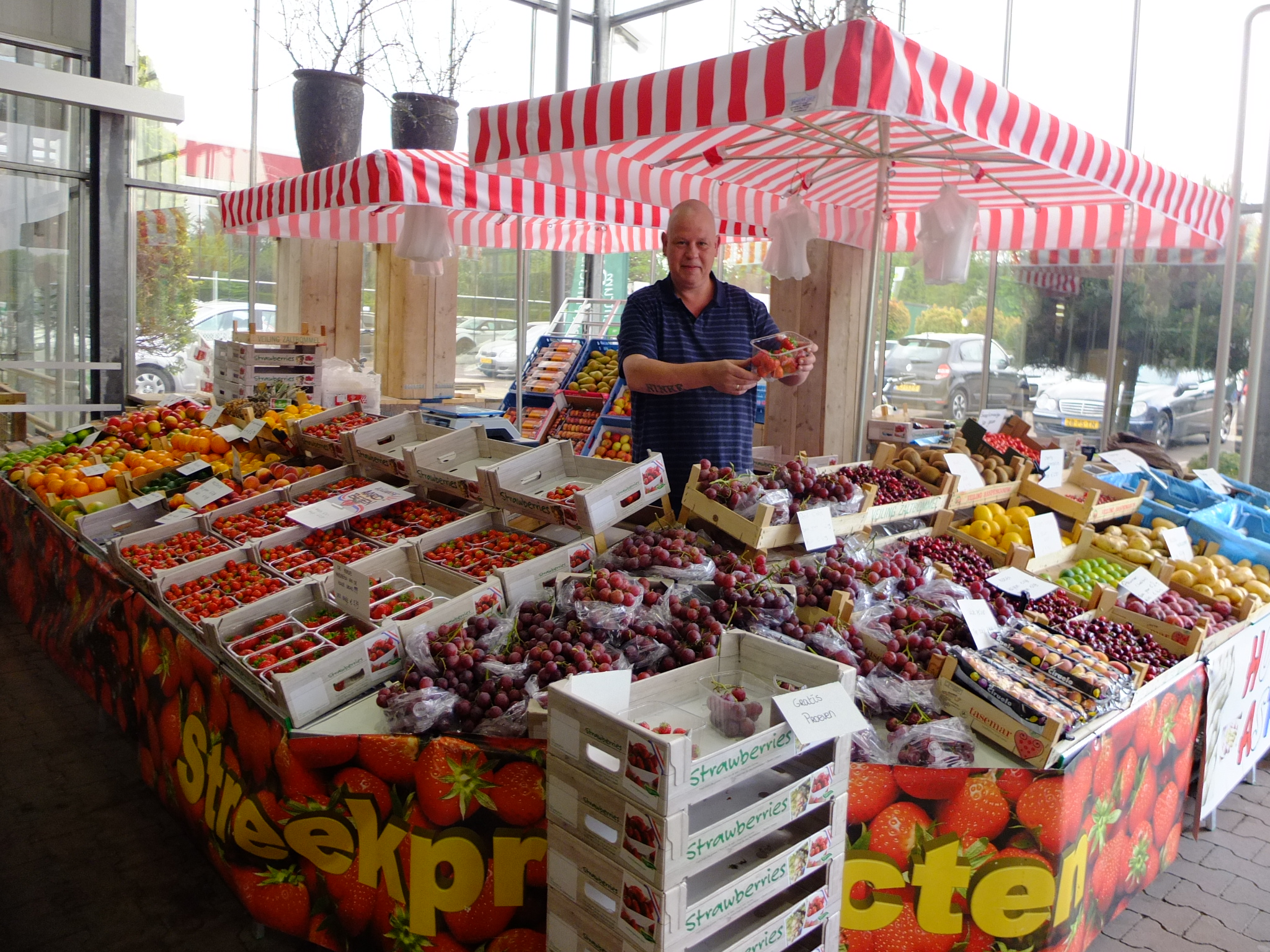
Market in Prinsenbeek

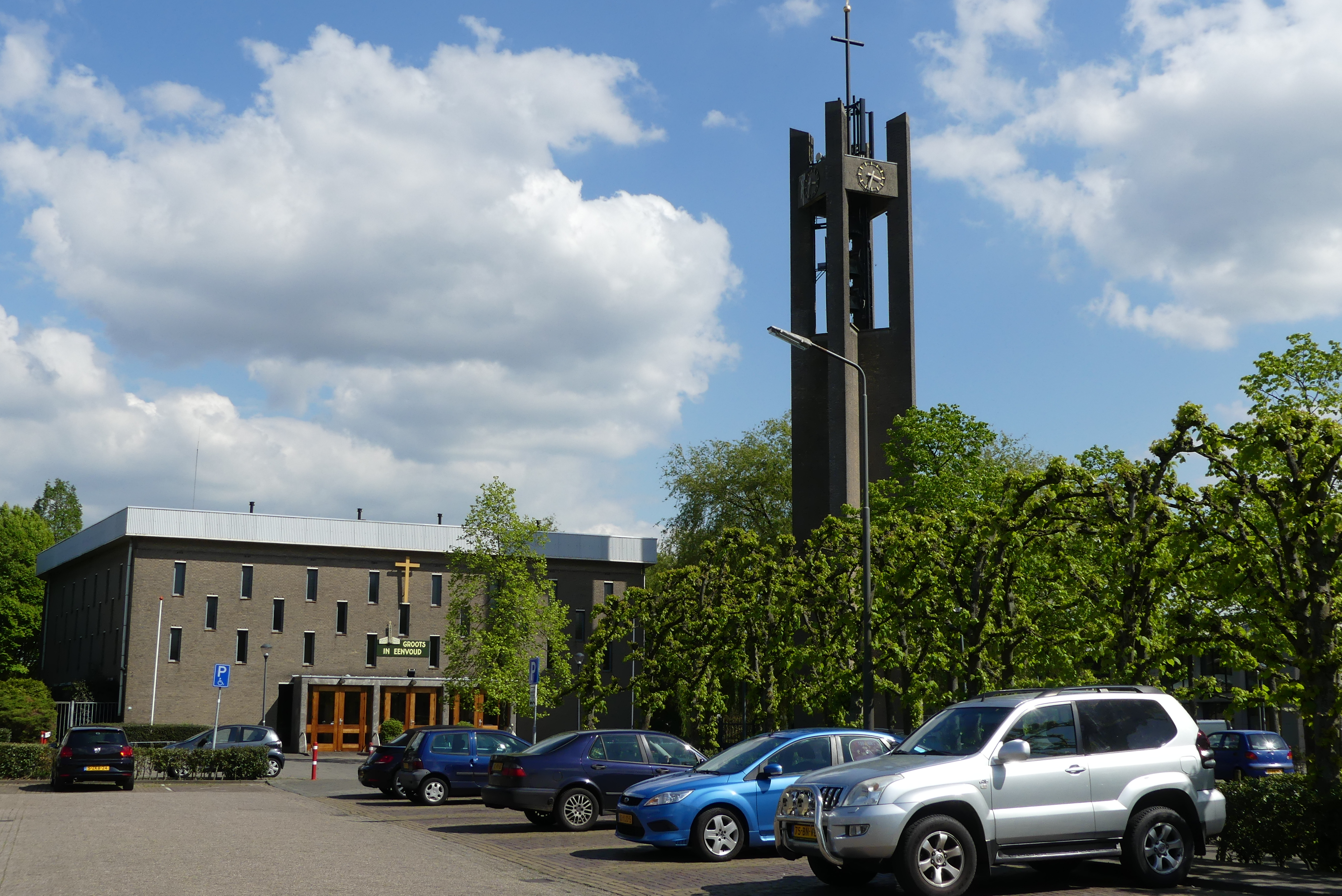
Church of Prinsenbeek
