= Notre-Dame-du-Bec =

- Commune
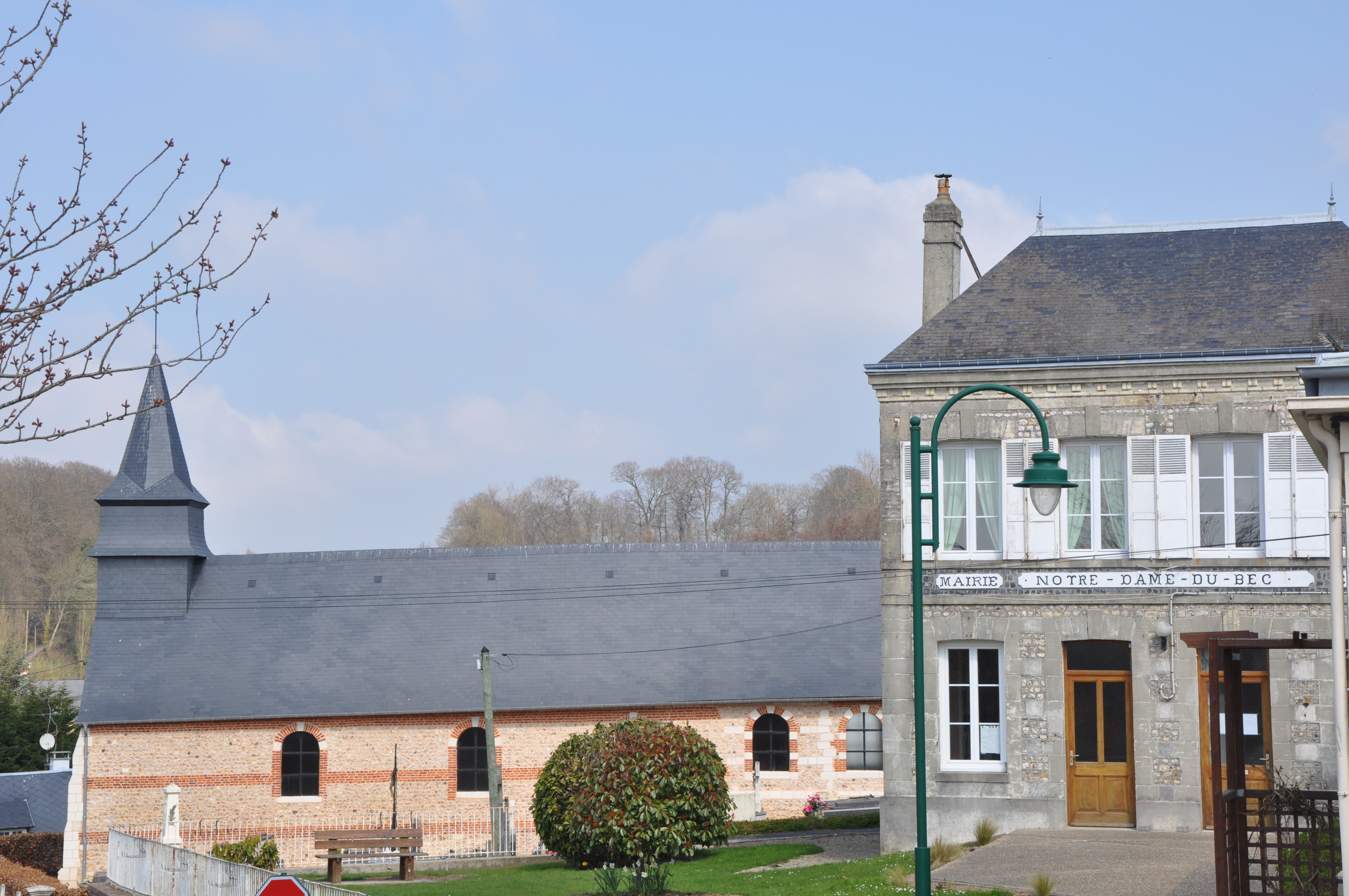
- Church and town hall
- Location of Notre-Dame-du-Bec
- Location within France Location within Normandy
- Coordinates: 49°35′39″N 0°12′46″E
- Country: France
- Region: Normandy
- Department: Seine-Maritime
- Arrondissement: Le Havre
- Canton: Octeville-sur-Mer
- Intercommunality: Le Havre Seine Métropole

Government
  - Mayor (2026–32): Pascal Cornu
- Area^{1}: 3.99 km^{2} (1.54 sq mi)
- Elevation: 58 m (190 ft)
- Highest elevation: 101 m (331 ft)
- Lowest elevation: 37 m (121 ft)
- Population (2023): 490
  - Density: 120/km^{2} (320/sq mi)
- Time zone: UTC+01:00 (CET)
  - Summer (DST): UTC+02:00 (CEST)
- INSEE/Postal code: 76477 /76133
- ^{1} French Land Register data, which excludes lakes, ponds, glaciers > 1 km^{2} (0.386 sq mi or 247 acres) and river estuaries.

Notre-Dame-du-Bec (French pronunciation: [nɔtʁə dam dy bɛk]) is a commune in the Seine-Maritime department in the Normandy region in northern France.

== Geography ==
A small farming and woodland village in the Pays de Caux, situated by the banks of the river Lézarde, some 10 miles (16 km) northeast of Le Havre, at the junction of the D79 and D32 roads.

== Population ==
Historical population
Year	Pop.	±% p.a.
1968	279	—
1975	292	+0.65%
1982	304	+0.58%
1990	324	+0.80%
1999	379	+1.76%
2007	425	+1.44%
2012	443	+0.83%
2017	452	+0.40%
2023	490	+1.35%
Source: INSEE

== Places of interest ==
- The church of Notre-Dame, dating from the sixteenth century.
- A feudal motte.

== See also ==
- Communes of the Seine-Maritime department
