= Stege, California =

Unincorporated community in United States

Stege
- Former unincorporated community
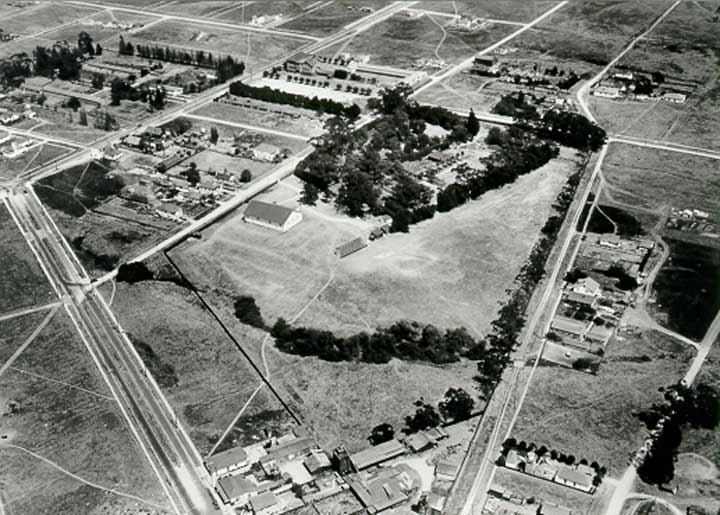
- Stege from a kite in 1930

- Location in California
- Coordinates: 37°55′00″N 122°19′38″W
- Country: United States
- State: California
- County: Contra Costa
- Cities: El Cerrito and Richmond
- Elevation: 23 ft (7 m)
- GNIS ID: 1659865
- FIPS code: 06-74046

Stege, founded in 1876, was an unincorporated community in western Contra Costa County, California, United States. The town has now been annexed and absorbed by the cities of Richmond and El Cerrito. It was located on the Southern Pacific Railroad 1.5 miles (2.4 km) south-southeast of downtown Richmond, at an elevation of 23 feet (7 m). The site is now located in the area known as the Richmond Annex, at coordinates: 37°55′00″N 122°19′38″W.

Stege was a farm town founded by Wilhelmina "Minna" Boehm Quilfelt and her fourth husband, Richard Stege. Quilfelt first bought land from Victor Castro in April 1853, and by 1879 had 1,000 acres. Stege moved there shortly after marrying Quilfelt on January 12, 1867. The town surrounded their ranch and featured a general store and railroad stop. The town had a largely agricultural economy, which included ranching, mining, chemical and explosives manufacturing, and frog farming for domestic consumption.

A post office operated at Stege from 1889 to 1935. The name of the community is still used for the Stege Sanitary District, a special district created in 1913, which continues to provide sewer service for El Cerrito, Kensington, and the Richmond Annex.
