= Becks (surname) =

Becks is an English and German surname. It is a variant to the more popular name Beck. This family name has been found in England since the 14th century and the Netherlands and Germany since the 16th century. Later, in the 19th century, this family name was also found in Ohio, United States, as well as in the Australian states of New South Wales and Queensland.

== List of people with surname Becks ==
- Antoine Becks (born 1981), Canadian-American musician
- Elvira Becks (born 1976), Dutch gymnast
- Ida M. Bowman Becks (1880–1953), married name of American elocutionist and suffragist Ida M. Bowman
