= British Estonian Chamber of Commerce =

British economic organization based in Tallinn, Estonia

British Estonian Chamber of Commerce (BECC) is a NGO founded in 1996 with the aim of bringing British and Estonian business communities together within Estonia. Its offices are based in Tallinn, Estonia.

The BECC is a member of the Council of British Chambers of Commerce in Europe (COBCOE) and the Foreign Investors Council in Estonia (FICE). The BECC organises monthly business seminars and conferences as well as business networking events.

== Trade missions and SmartEST ==
The BECC organises a trade mission for Estonian politicians and business persons to the UK each year. This includes a trade conference (under their SmartEst logo) to which UK counterparts are invited to attend and meet the Estonian delegation.

The 2010 SmartEST Trade Conference "New Nordic Estonia" was held in Edinburgh, Scotland, on 13 September at the Signet Library. The 2011 SmartEST Trade Conference "Estonia after joining the Euro-zone and OECD" was held in London on 16 September at the Mansion House.

== Charity work ==
The BECC regularly holds fundraising events for charitable causes in Estonia. They donated over €5000 to the Estonian Cystic Fibrosis Association in January 2012.
