= Becque =

Becque may refer to:

- Becque (river), the name of several rivers
- Henry Becque (1837–1899), French dramatist
- Réginald Becque (born 1972), French footballer
- Emile de Becque, a fictional character in South Pacific

== See also ==
- Bec (disambiguation)
- Becq (disambiguation)
- Beek (disambiguation)
- DeBeque Formation, a geologic formation
- De Beque, Colorado, a town in the U.S.
