= Steve Beeks =

English football player and manager (born 1971)

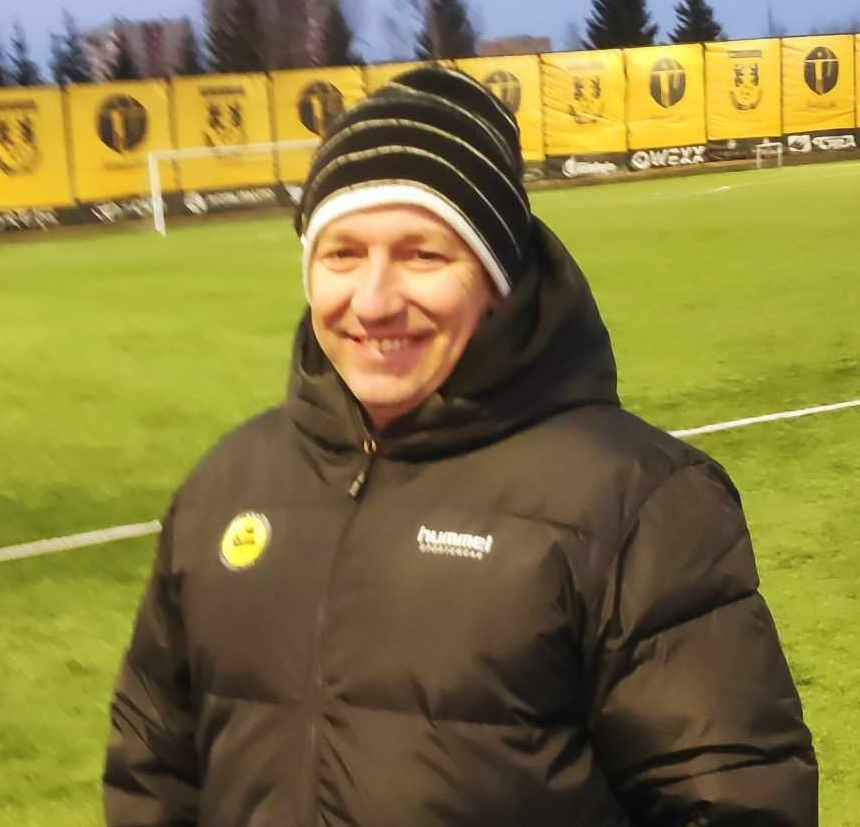

Personal information
- Full name: Stephen John Beeks
- Date of birth: 10 April 1971 (age 55)
- Place of birth: Ashford, Surrey, England
- Position: Midfielder

Senior career*
Years	Team	Apps	(Gls)
1989–1991	Aldershot	3	(0)
1992–1996	Staines Town		
1996–1998	Aldershot Town		
1998–1999	Basingstoke Town		

Managerial career
- 2001–2002: Fleet Town
- 2003–2007: Molesey
- 2009–2010: Margate (assistant)
- 2010–2011: Åland United
- 2012–2020: IFK Mariehamn (director)
- 2021–2024: Åland United
- 2025: FC Gintra
- * Club domestic league appearances and goals

Stephen John Beeks (born 10 April 1971) is an English former professional footballer and pro licensed coach.

== Early life ==
Stephen John Beeks, was born in Ashford, Surrey, England on 10 April 1971. Beeks was at Chelsea for a short period before he signed for Egham Town F.C.'s Youth team at 15 and made his senior debut just a year later. Beeks scored on his debut in a 2–0 win v local rivals Chertsey Town. He made a significant number of appearances in their Isthmian, Suburban and Allied Counties Leagues sides during the '87/8 campaign and received their Billy King Most Improved Player trophy.

== Playing career ==
In September '88, as a 17-year-old Beeks was signed by then English Football League 3rd Division (now EFL League One) side Aldershot, where he did a one-year apprenticeship; he was Youth Team player of the year and was given a professional contract. Beeks had an illness which kept him out of football for a long period of time but was able to recover to make his Football League debut (a home defeat by Hereford United) on 1 May 1989. At the end of season 88/89 Beeks signed another one-year contract: he only made two more Football League appearances but was a regular in the 1st team squad. A highlight of the season was scoring twice against Arsenal in a reserve team fixture, and being involved in Aldershot's FA Cup run which ended in a defeat by West Ham United in a 3rd Round replay, before his release in May '91.

Beeks next signed for Isthmian Premier Sutton United, where he played the first half of season 1991/2, scoring on his debut in a 1–0 win over Martin O'Neill's Wycombe Wanderers F.C. His 20-odd appearances, including one against Staines Town, prompted Neil Price into signing him. Beeks would remain at Staines until Dec '96, amassing 299 First Team appearances and scoring 80 goals, including netting 31 penalties for the Swans. He helped the Club win a Middlesex Senior and Charity Cup 'double' in '94 scoring in both finals, and the '95 Isthmian Full Members' (Carlsberg) Cup. During 1993/4, he was top scorer with 27 goals, and played in 71 of the club's 72 1st team games; he was voted Players' Player of the Year in 1996, and also gained a Middlesex 'cap' marking 5 games for the senior representative side.

Staines were promoted into the Isthmian Premier when finishing 3rd in 1995/6. However, 6 months later, Beeks opted to return to Aldershot by signing for the new Aldershot Town (1992), where he played from Dec '96 to Jan '98, becoming one of only eight players to have represented both the town's original and reformed clubs.

He then signed for Isthmian Premier side Basingstoke Town, before unexpectedly securing a deadline day March '99 move to Alan Devonshire's Maidenhead United, for whom his extra time goal helped to defeat Wycombe Wanderers and lift the Berks & Bucks Senior Cup.

== Coaching career ==
=== Steve Beeks Soccer School ===
Ever since his early days at Aldershot, Beeks had been interested in coaching and passed his Preliminary coaching badge with Dale Banton. Upon his release, he coached children as a career, firstly working with Colin Smith then working successfully with numerous local schools and clubs, achieving unprecedented success with the tiny Our Lady of the Rosary School (Staines). In 1994, he took a Staines Town under-10 1/2 team to Åland, a tour he continued to make annually, winning the Alandia Cup – which at that time was Europe's largest single age-group competition – in '95 and '96 as Staines Town, and six more times as Steve Beeks Soccer School (England) - SBSS. Remarkably, they were semi-finalists 15 out of 20 years, in a tournament which typically includes around 90 teams. His sides have also performed well in the Arsenal Invitational Tournament, and at events in Denmark. He was also co-founder of Colne Valley Girls FC.

=== Cove FC ===
Beeks' senior coaching career started in June 1999 when he was appointed Player-Manager of Cove, taking this perennially under-achieving club to a Combined Counties Football League and League Cup double, and the last 16 of the FA Vase. Another highlight of his two seasons there was knocking Bognor Regis Town out of the FA Cup, followed by a narrow loss in a replay to Lewes.

=== Fleet Town FC ===
Beeks left Cove in Sept '01, and a couple of months later accepted a similar post at Fleet Town, who had made a poor start in the Wessex League. However, only two defeats in 36 games saw them finish runners-up and gain promotion to the Southern League. Fleet were also League Cup finalists. He left Fleet in the wake of budget cuts early the next season, and signed as a player for Winchester City, who romped the Hampshire League (181 goals, 109 points), reached the FA Vase quarter-finals, and lifted the Southampton Senior Cup at St Mary's Stadium.

=== Molesey FC ===
Beeks started the 2003/4 season playing at Conference club Farnborough Town, but having regained fitness and reached the brink of a 1st Team call, he accepted the offer to manage Molesey. Despite The Moles' recurrent off-field problems, Beeks twice built up a side from scratch, discovering Sergio Torres, and guiding the side to their best ever FA Trophy run, whilst playing himself at the back. Three years of progression resulted in a higher league table position each year, culminating in Molesey's highest position in over a decade, including an unbeaten 19 match run, and an Isthmian League Manager of the Month award. Boardroom wranglings and a desire to concentrate on his coaching qualifications saw him step down in summer '07. He had then already become Academy Director for Wealdstone F.C. at Stanmore College.

=== AFC Wimbledon ===
In the 2008/9 season he took on the role of chief scout at AFC Wimbledon under Terry Brown and was instrumental in the Dons finding Steve Gregory, who was later sold to AFC Bournemouth. AFC Wimbledon were promoted as champions In 2009. Later in the same year he passed the UEFA 'A' Coaching Licence and in 2009/10 season he had a short spell as coach at Mark Butler's Margate F.C.

=== Åland United ===
In late 2010 Beeks was appointed head coach of Åland United, a professional team in the Naisten Liiga, the top division of women's football in Finland. Åland United finished fourth in 2011, 6 points from gold, and 2nd in 2012, 2 points off the title, and with a new league record for goals scored, which was quite an achievement as the club came through some big financial problems under the guidance of newly appointed Peter Lindbäck in 2012. During this time Åland United signed and developed international players like Pille Raadik (Estonia), Hayley Lauder (Scotland), and numerous Finnish internationals such as Adelina Engman (latterly at Chelsea).

=== IFK Mariehamn ===
In 2012 Beeks, was head-hunted by IFK Mariehamn to become their academy director. He has overseen the progress of numerous players to Finnish youth National teams and IFK's 1st team. IFK Mariehamn won the Finnish Cup in 2015, and played in the UEFA Europa League 2016. In 2016 IFK won the Finnish top league, and played in the UEFA Champions League in 2017. In February 2018 he completed the UEFA Pro Licence: his tutor was the Finnish national men's team Head Coach Markku Kanerva.

=== FC Gintra ===
On 3 January 2025 FC Gintra announced, that signed with new head coach. In 2025 with FC Gintra won Women`s A lyga. On 13 November 2025 was announced that Steve Beeks left Gintra Club.

== Playing statistics ==
First Team Career appearances / goals:

Egham Town 31 / 3 (+ non 1st XI 50 / 20).
Aldershot 3 / 0 (+ Reserves 50 / 16, Youth 35 / 20).
Sutton United 20 / 8 (+ Reserves 4 / 2).
Staines Town 299 / 80 (+ Reserves 3 / 1).
Aldershot Town 49 / 9.
Basingstoke Town 49 / 6 (+ Reserves 1 / 0).
Maidenhead United 12 / 2.
Cove 80 / 12.
Fleet Town 35 / 7.
Winchester City 30 / 6.
Molesey 111 / 2.
Representative games:
Middlesex FA 8 / 2.
Hampshire FA 7 / 0.
Surrey FA 5 / 2.

== Managerial statistics ==
Completed league season records:

Cove (Combined Counties League)
1999-2000 - played 40, won 17, drew 9, lost 14, goals for 68, against 61, points 60 (8th of 21)
2000-2001 - played 40, won 35, drew 2, lost 3, goals for 146, against 28, points 107 (1st of 21)

Fleet Town (Wessex League)
2001-2002 - played 44, won 29, drew 9, lost, 6 goals for 107, against 59, points 95 (2nd of 23)

Åland United (Naisten Liiga)
2011 - played 27, won 19, drew 2, lost 6, goals for 86, against 31, points 59 (4th of 10)
2012 - played 27, won 22, drew 2, lost 3, goals for 113, against 11, points 68 (2nd of 10)
