= Bek family =

Coat of arms of the Bek family

The Bek family is the name of a family in Lincolnshire, England, from which sprang several men of eminence in the thirteenth century. The Beks were descended from one Walter Bek, called in the 'Great Survey' Walter Flandrensis, who came over with William the Conqueror, and received from him the lordship of Firesby in Lincolnshire, et multa alia maneria. From his three sons, I. Henry, II. Walter, and III. John, sprang three great Lincolnshire families: I. Bek of Eresby, II. Bek of Luceby, III. Bek of Botheby. With the last of these, we have no concern.

I. From Henry Bek, lord of Eresby, was descended, about the middle of the thirteenth century, Walter Bek, who had three sons: (1) John, lord of Eresby, from whose daughter the Lords Willoughby de Eresby claimed their descent, as they obtained from her their barony; (2) Thomas (d. 1293 ), who became bishop of St. David's in 1280, (3) Antony, the third son (d. 1310), who became bishop of Durham in 1283.

II. From Bek of Luceby sprang another Walter, who was constable of Lincoln Castle at the time when his kinsmen Thomas I and Antony I were respectively bishops of St. David's and Durham, and died 25 August 1291. He had three sons: (1) John, born 18 August 1278; (2) Antony II, born 5 August 1279; (3) Thomas II, born 22 February 1282.

The three sons were all underage at the date of their father's death, and probably became wards of their kinsman Antony I, the great bishop of Durham. (1) Of John there is nothing that needs to be said. (2) Antony II was bishop of Norwich from 30 March 1337 till his death, 19 December 1343. (3) Thomas II was consecrated bishop 7 July 1342, and died on 2 February 1340-7. [The chief authority for the Beks is the MS. Harl, 3720, from the fourteenth century, and appears to have been drawn up as a family chronicle sometime in the reign of Edward III. There are notices of the various members of the family in the Rolls of Parliament, the Chronicles, and other publications issued by the Master of the Rolls. The identity of the name is likely to cause confusion.]
