= Beke (Warnow) =

River in Germany

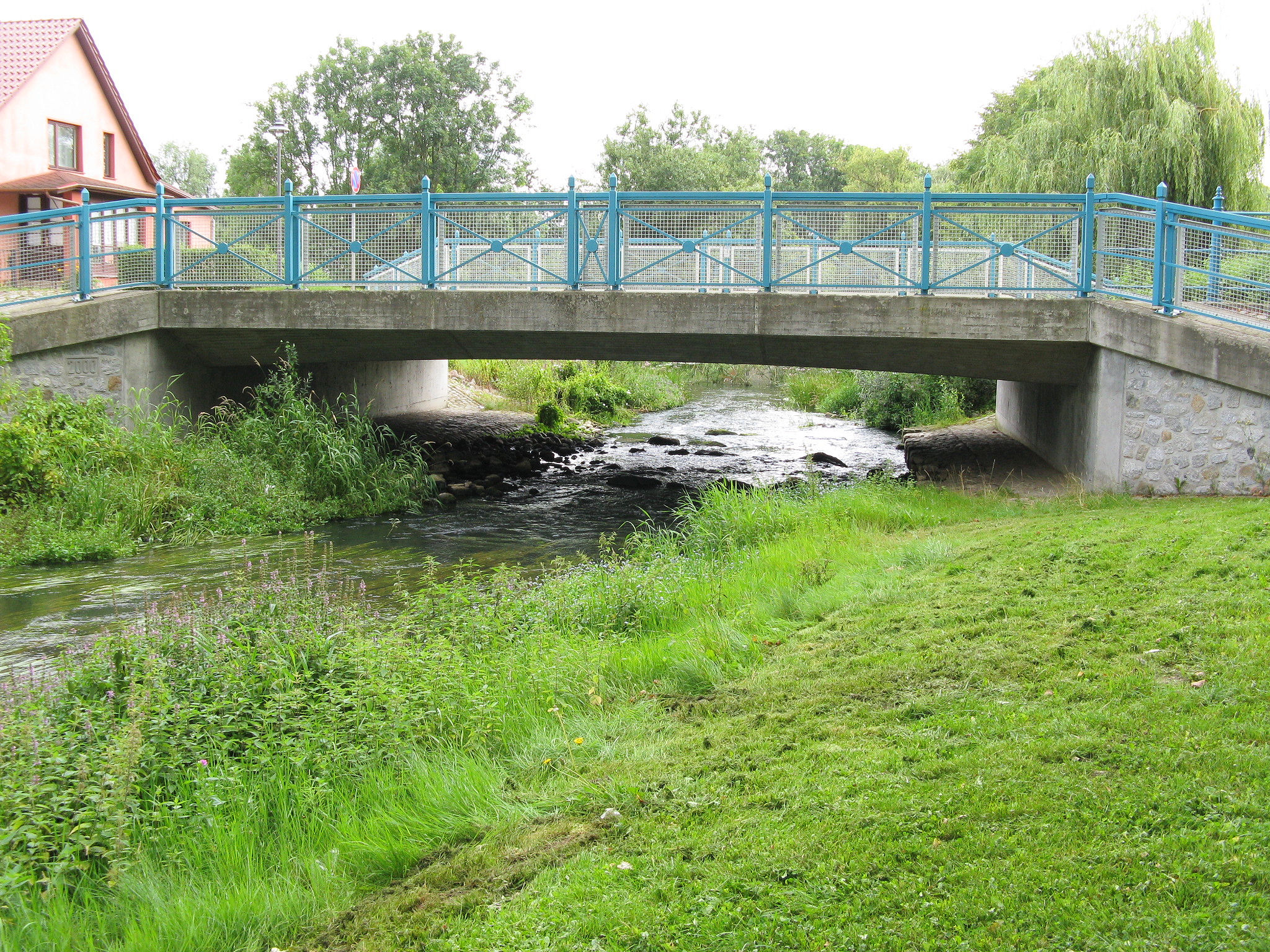

Location
- Country: Germany
- State: Mecklenburg-Vorpommern

Physical characteristics
- Mouth
  - location: Warnow
  - coordinates: 53.9423°N 12.1107°E

Basin features
- Progression: Warnow→ Baltic Sea

Beke is a river of Mecklenburg-Vorpommern, Germany. It flows into the Warnow in Schwaan.

== See also ==
- List of rivers of Mecklenburg-Vorpommern
