= Beek (disambiguation) =

Beek is a town and municipality in Limburg, Netherlands.

Beek (Dutch for "stream") may also refer to:

== Places ==
- Beek, Berg en Dal, a town in Gelderland, Netherlands
- Beek, Montferland, a town in Gelderland, Netherlands
- De Beek, Apeldoorn, a hamlet in Apeldoorn, Gelderland, Netherlands
- De Beek, Ermelo, a population center in Ermelo, Gelderland, Netherlands
- Beek, Venray, a hamlet in Limburg, Netherlands
- Beek en Donk, a town in Laarbeek, North Brabant, Netherlands
- Prinsenbeek or Beek, a town and former municipality in North Brabant, Netherlands
- De Beek, Asten, a town in Asten, North Brabant, Netherlands

== Waterways ==
- Beek (Hamme), a river of Lower Saxony, Germany
- Beek, a strait separating the German island of Koos from the mainland

== People with the surname ==
- Alice D. Engley Beek (1876-1951), American painter
- Anna van Westerstee Beek (1657–1717), Dutch publisher of maps
- David Beck (painter) (1621–1656), Dutch portrait painter
- Joop Beek (1917–1983), Dutch-Indonesian priest and political consultant
- Joseph Beek (1880–1968), American Secretary of the California State Senate
- Sascha van Beek (born 1983), German politician

== See also ==
- Beck (disambiguation)
- Becque (disambiguation), Northern France adaptation of the word
- Beke (disambiguation)
- Beeks
