= XC2200 =

The NORTHBENZ Tiema XC2200 is a 7.5 ton 6x6 heavy military vehicle. It is based on the Mercedes-Benz NG manufactured by North-Benz Truck Corporation, Chongqing.

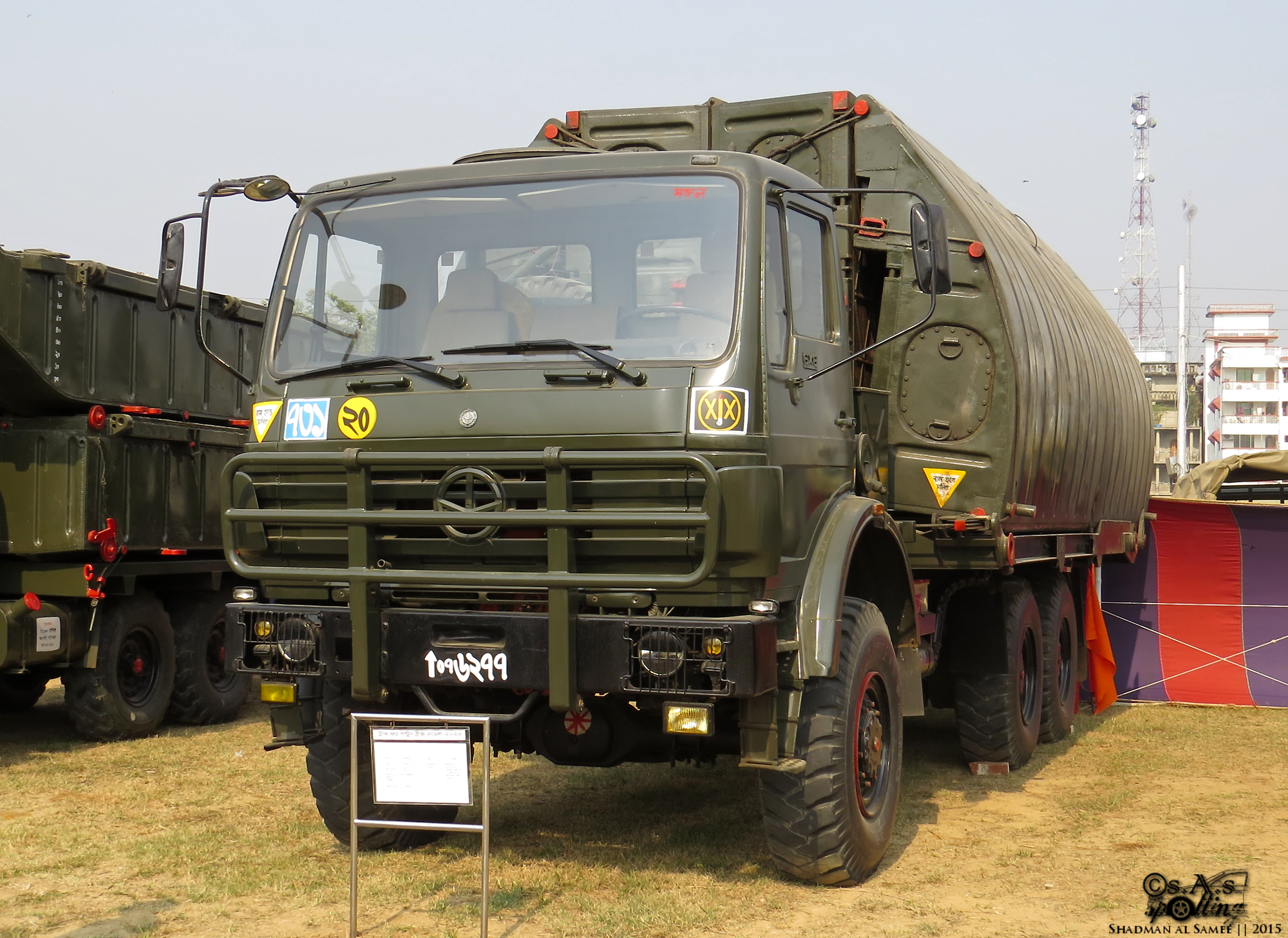
Bangladesh Army Type 79A ribbon bridge on Tiema XC2200 truck

The vehicle is used by the People's Liberation Army (PLA), as a heavy materials transport and as a chassis for special bodies.

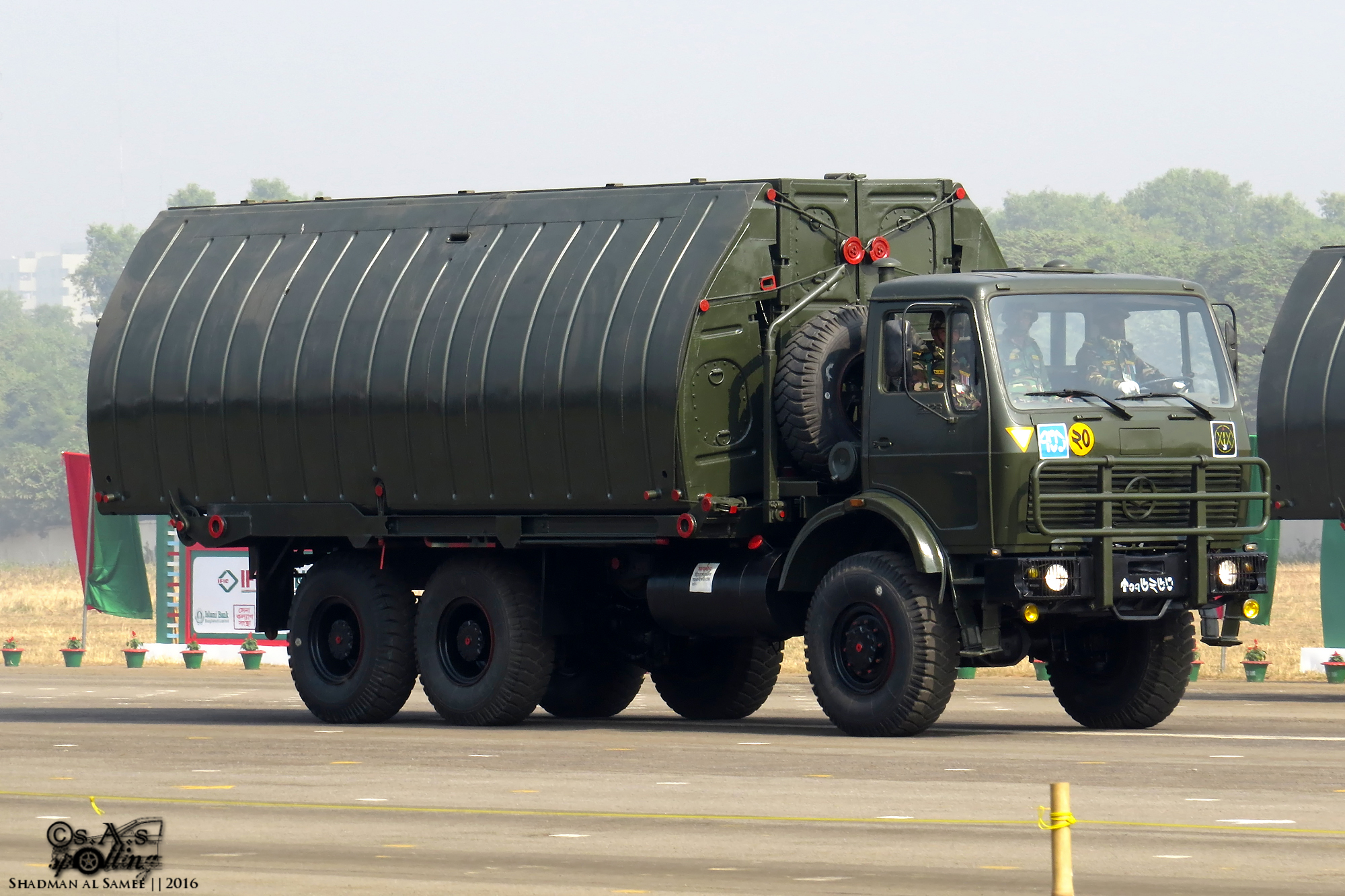

The vehicle was produced in the 1980s based on the Mercedes-Benz 2060 vehicle.

Development of the vehicle started in the 1970s, when China purchased a small quantity of heavy German Mercedes Benz 2060th Vehicles. These were used as artillery tractor for heavy guns. Vehicles are proved and it was decided to manufacture them in China. Prototype with the original name TM-SC2030 prototype was completed in 1982. After problems with the original Chinese designed engine and gearbox in 1985, it was decided to import the German air-cooled diesel engines and mechanical transmissions KHD413 ZF.

Serial production started in 1986 with the number of vehicles produced approximately 2000 pieces per year. Vehicles were able to work under different conditions across mainland China from warm areas in the south, across the hot sands of the Gobi Desert to the icy heights of Tibet.

In addition to service in the PLA and the civilian sector of the PRC, the vehicle was exported to Pakistan, Thailand, Indonesia and Sri Lanka.

The NORTHBENZ Tiema XC2200 has a two-door cab with the engine located under the cab, with four seats and roof hatch. The vehicle is fitted with lockable differentials on all axles.

In addition to the basic freight vehicle variants, it is also produced in several variants including special options 4x4, 8x8, truck crane, box body, bridge Transport, boats Transport, pavement fitter chassis and bodies for armaments.

On the chassis of the vehicle is also built armored vehicle WZ-551 .

== Specifications ==
- Seats: 1 +2
- Configuration: 6x6
- Weight (communication, max.): 20000 kg
- Weight (terrain, max.): 19000 kg
- Weight (unloaded): 11000 kg
- Max. cargo mass (communications): 9000 kg
- Max. weight of load (terrain): 8000 kg
- Length: 9422 cm
- Width: 2500 cm
- Height: 3200 cm
- Wheelbase: 4,100 cm + 1,450 cm
- Max speed: 85 km / h
- Engine: air-cooled diesel engine BF8L413FG, 188 kW, 1200 rpm
- Transmission: ZF5S-111GPA, 9 forward speeds, 1 reverse
- Tires: 14.00 x 20

== Variants ==
- Type 90 - People's Liberation Army Ground Forces
