= Mercedes-Benz SK =

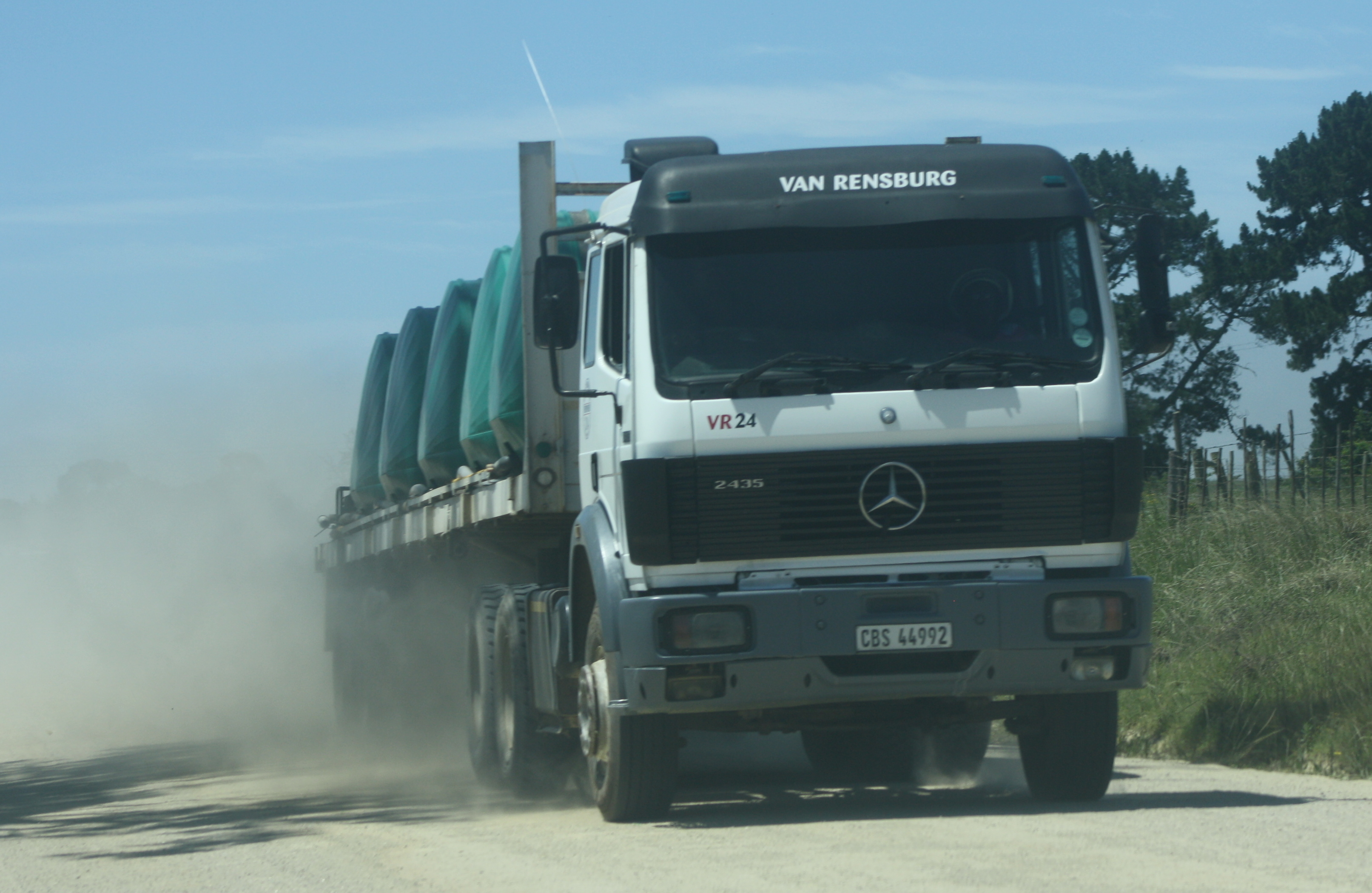

Overview
- Manufacturer: Mercedes-Benz
- Also called: BeiBen Powerstar (China)
- Production: 1988–1998

Body and chassis
- Layout: cabover truck

Powertrain
- Engine: 9.6 L OM401 LA V6; 11.0 L OM441 V6; 12.8 L OM402 LA V8; 14.6 L OM442 V8; 15.1 L OM442 V8; 18.3 L OM423 LA V10

Dimensions
- Curb weight: 10,000–26,000 kg (22,000–57,300 lb)

Chronology
- Predecessor: Mercedes-Benz NG
- Successor: Mercedes-Benz Actros

The trucks of the Mercedes-Benz series Schwere Klasse (SK, for "heavy class") were produced from 1988 through 1998, when they were succeeded by the Mercedes-Benz Actros. The Mercedes Benz SK, in essence is basically a revamped Mercedes-Benz NG chassis with a few added driver comforts and electronic assistance and diagnosis. Therefore, it is a much more comfortable ride than its predecessor. There are at least two versions of Mercedes Benz SK that got licensed manufacturing by other companies.

== 1988 ==
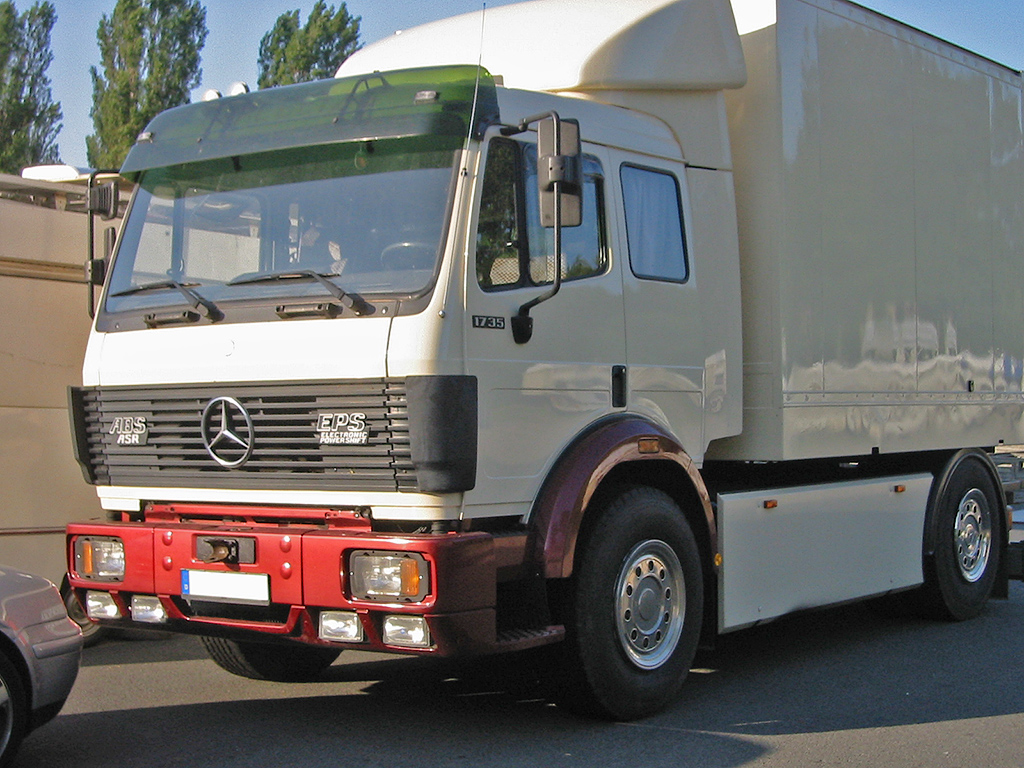
Pre-facelift (1988–1994)

The SK series is basically a mere evolution of the Neue Generation, which was built up to the year 1989. There were few changes to the cab: radiator grill and wind leading plates were combined optically, and the lower edges of the side windows were made with a progressive decline towards the front. This design feature had already been realized in 1977 with the Mercedes-Benz TN later renamed T1 in 1980, and in 1984 with the LK/LN model, until 1998.

== 1994 ==
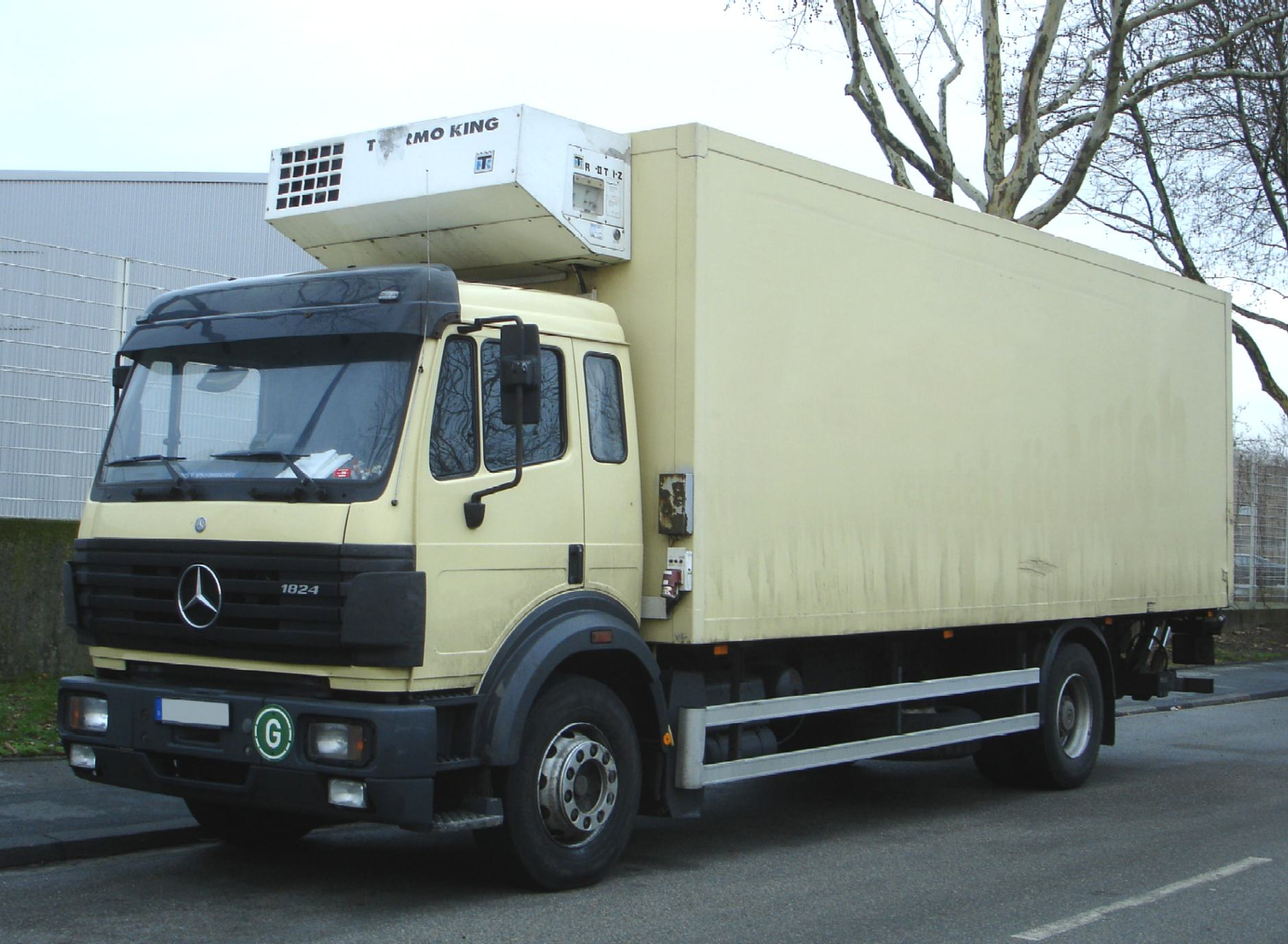
Post-facelift (1994–1998)

In 1994 the SK model, which apart from the upgraded engines was still based on the NG series from 1973, was facelifted for the last time with a new front design. The focus was on better aerodynamics which would yield better fuel economy in testing.

== Engines ==
The Mercedes Benz SK were available with the ever popular OM44X series engines, which were an evolution from the highly respected OM42X series used in the predecessor NG chassis. As a result, the OM4XX series share many similar (not to be confused with identical) components which date as far back to the very early Mercedes Benz OM401 and 402 diesel engines.

With the introduction of Euro 1 in 1992, designers and engineers had to find a way to reduce diesel motor emissions over its predecessor. One way this was achieved was by effectively 'de-tuning' the old motor by retarding the ignition timing by several degrees and thus reducing combustion temperatures and NOx emissions. Such de-tuning led to an 10% increase in fuel consumption over earlier model engines.

These new generation OM44X engines, with their robust cast iron blocks, much like their predecessor engines, were specifically very popular in harsh hot desert climates due to their large displacements and low operating temperatures.

The OM44X series engines had various upgrades from the OM42X and OM40X engines. The emphasis on upgrades were to improve cooling of engine components, engine pressure tolerances and tolerate higher engine loads.

Improvements such as:

- Further reinforced cast iron blocks with strengthening at the intermediate walls, housing top and outer walls. Overall an increase of approximately 6 kg of reinforcement material over the predecessor block.
- Further improved cylinder heads developed to meet increased operating pressures and temperatures. The cylinder heads have been strengthened at the top sections and have improved exhaust passages, valve seating and nozzle section to match higher pressures. Intake and exhaust valves as well as seat rings have also been redesigned for better gas flow, cooling properties and valve springs improved to deal with higher engine operating pressures.
- Finned air compressor to assist air flow around cylinder liner used in conjunction with coolant of the cylinder and piston.
- Motor oil cooler core with reinforcement to limit thermal expansion and movement.

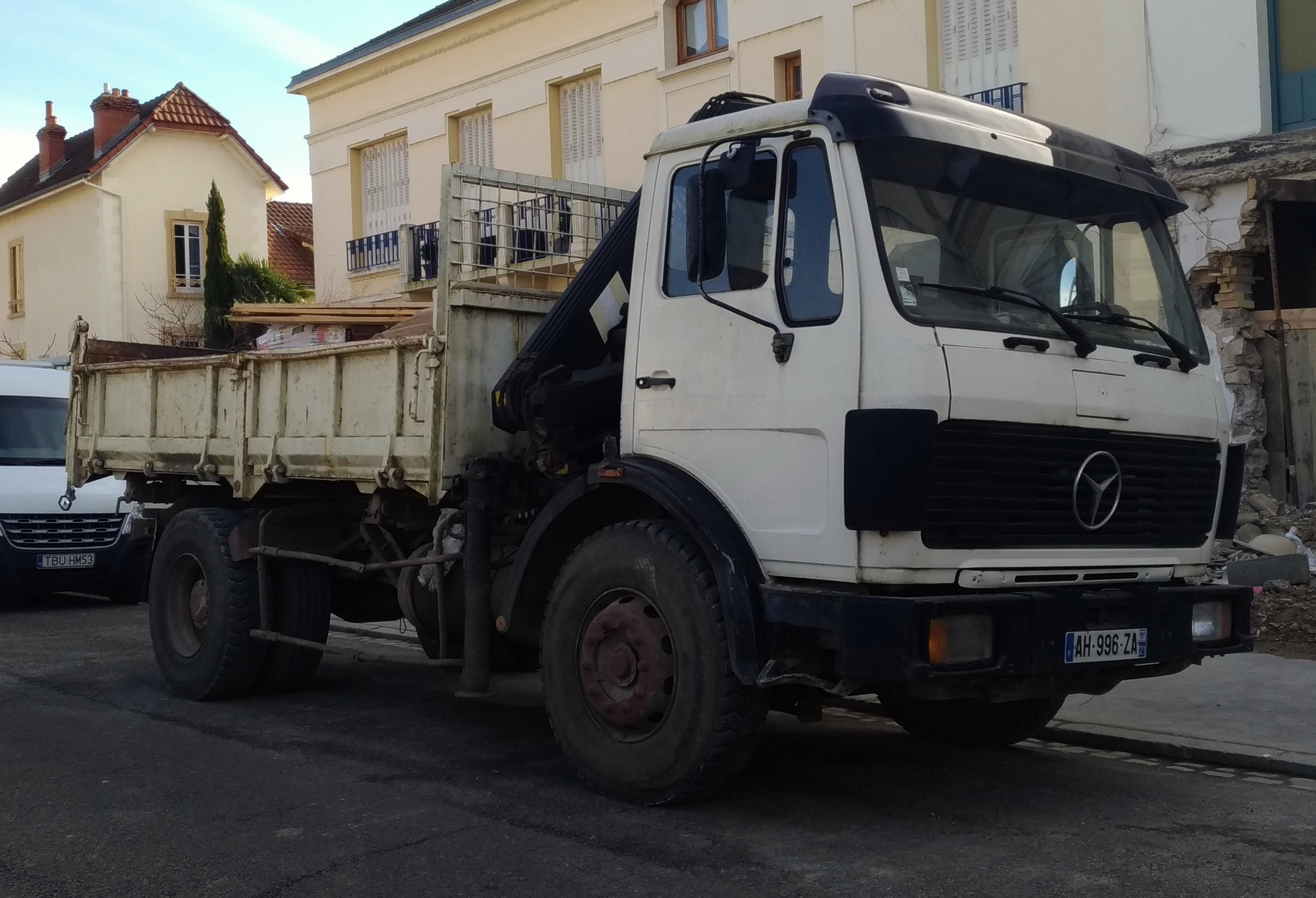
Mercedes-Benz SK 1922 tipper truck

These engines were initially released as two variants:

(Released from 1989 to 1992)

- OM441 Naturally aspirated V6 engine which yielded approximately 224 hp
- OM442 Naturally aspirated V8 engine which yielded 290 hp (approx. 1100 N m of torque)
- OM442LA twin turbo V8 which yielded between 350 hp (approx. 1650 N m of torque) (without intercooler) and 500 hp.

The later variants (Released from 1992 to 1998) were classed as EURO 1 Emission standard engines.

- OM441 LA Single Turbo V6 engine which yielded 220 hp and up to 340 hp when fitted with an intercooler.
- OM442 LA 14.6 Litre Twin Turbo V8 engine which yielded between 350 hp and up to 530 hp when fitted with an intercooler.

Fuel consumption of the OM442 LA twin turbo V8 is said to be tested at approximately 40 L/(100 km). On comparison, its successor the OM501La of the Mercedes Actros yields fuel economy of 37 L/(100 km).

== Transmissions ==
With the introduction of Euro 1 class emission control regulation, it is only understandable that the engines gained a mass disadvantage compared with the earlier models. As the engines were now getting heavier due to Euro 1 class emissions fitting turbos, intercoolers, piping etc. As a result, Mercedes Benz moved away from the ZF branded 16s series Ecosplit cast iron transmissions used in the late model NG chassis and towards a Getrag manufactured aluminium 16 speed synchromesh transmission of models G155 and G180.

The 155 and 180 in the transmission code, much like ZF's designation signifies maximum torque the transmission is rated in NM.

These transmissions were much lighter than the ZF 16s transmissions and could also tolerate a greater range of engine power up to 440 hp thanks mostly to their double clutch pressure plate capability and robust gear design. However a downside was that the Getrag synchronisers where not as robust as the synchronisers of the 16s ZF series.

The transmission was released with one of two versions of gear shift, either the conventional stick shift or the newly developed EPS (Electronic PowerShift) system. The semi automatic transmission was introduced as a means to make driving easier in that the driver required less thinking of rpm matching when approaching steep inclinations.

However, much like most electronic shift mechanisms of that mid to late 1990s era the system did have some mechanical gremlins and reliability issues at times. Although it may have been more comfortable from a drivers point of view, the EPS was not very popular between truck owners and operators, which even made some truck owners sceptical of the reliability of later released Actros Telligent transmissions.

== Ssangyong SY Truck ==
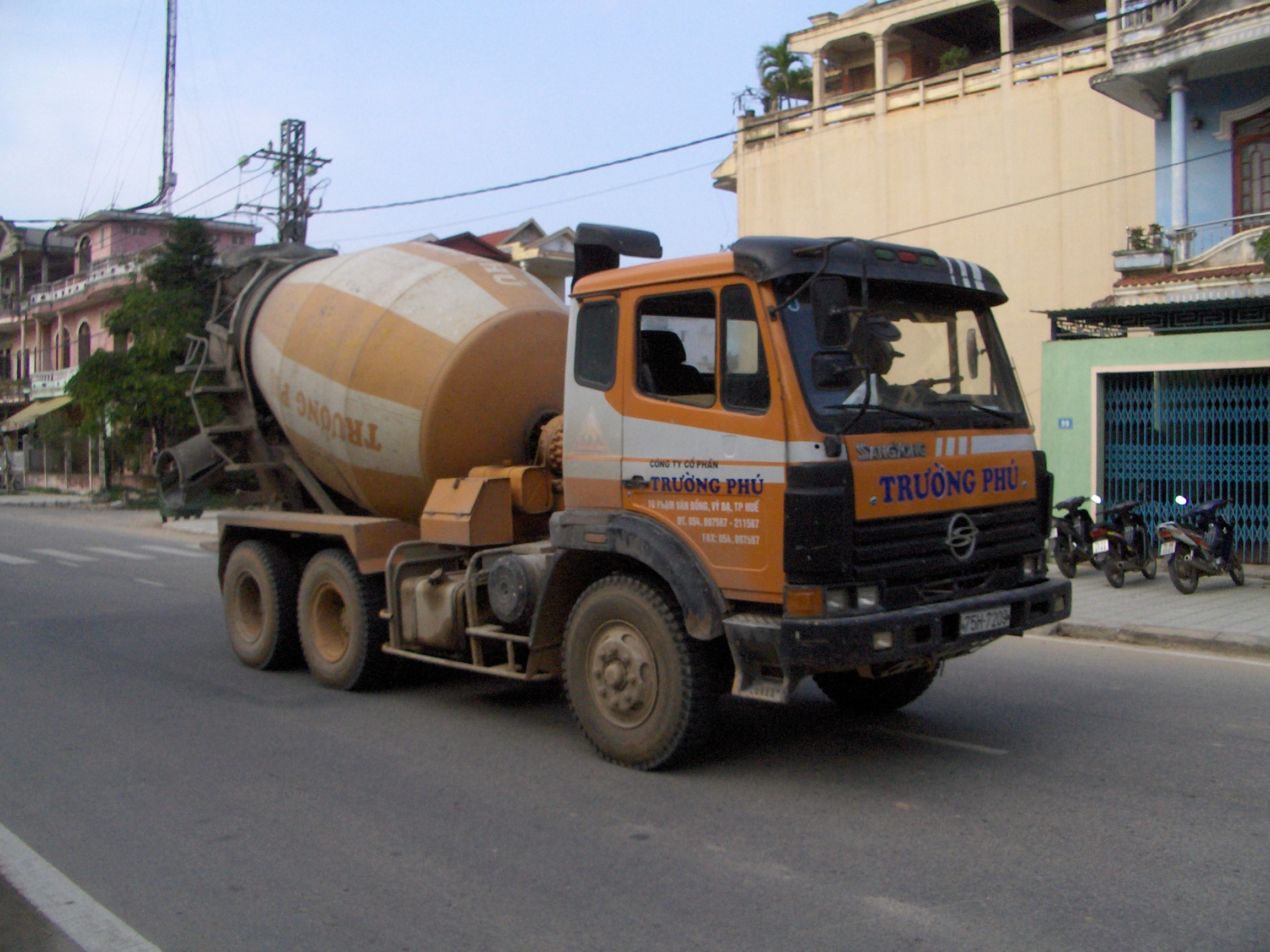
Ssangyong SY (license built by Mercedes Benz)

The Ssangyong SY Truck was a truck built by Ssangyong Motor in South Korea. This truck was produced from 1993 until 1998, production ended due to Ssangyong's bankruptcy. It uses OM442 V8 engine twin turbo but detuned from 400 hp into 340 hp. It is the only South Korean truck that uses European design cabin and technology, whereas rivals such as Hyundai 91A and Asia/KIA Granto uses Japanese design and technology.

== BeiBen PowerStar ==
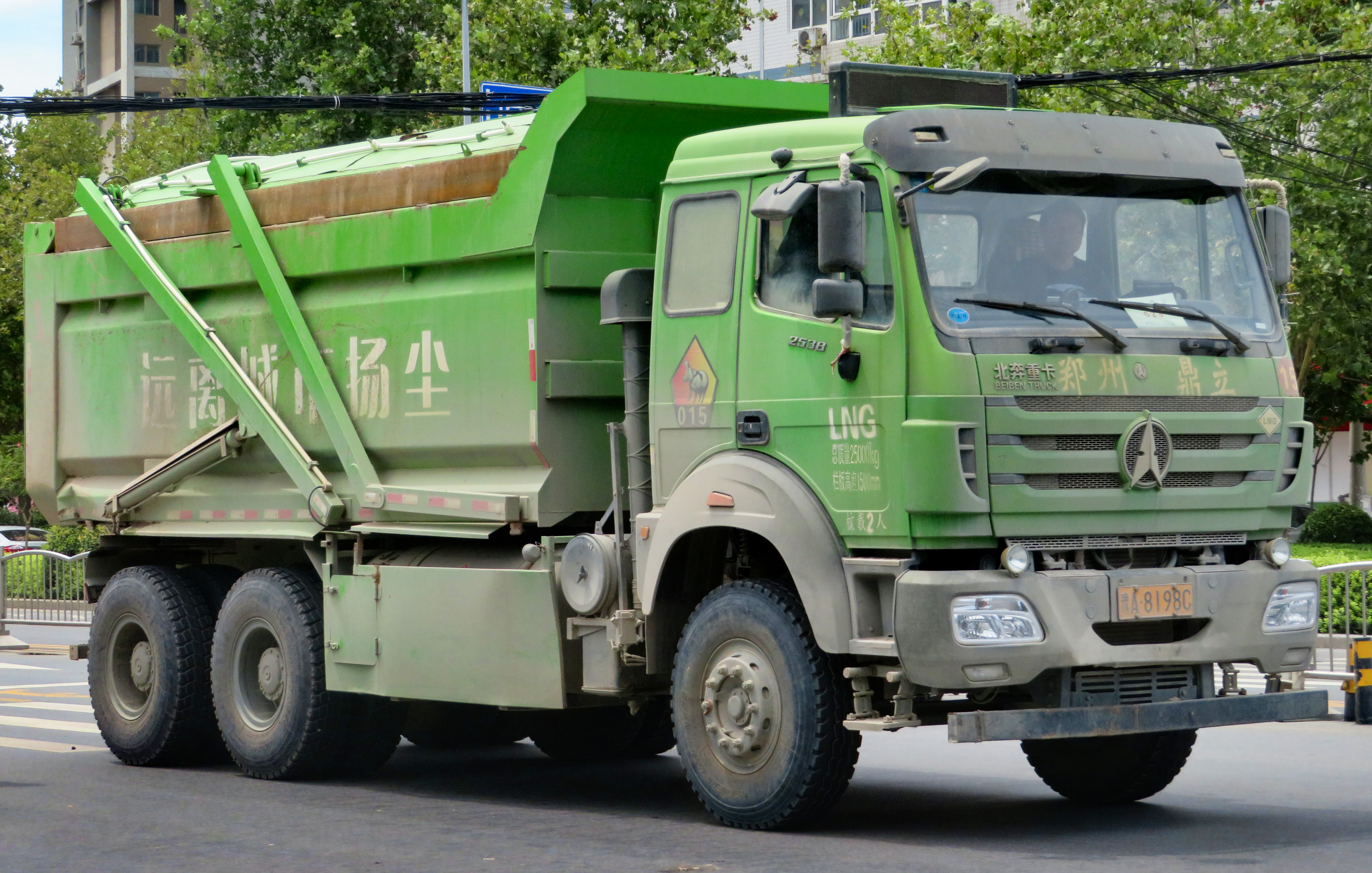
BeiBen Truck 2538 dump truck based on Mercedes-Benz SK in Zhengzhou, Henan Province, China

BeiBen PowerStar is a truck built by Beiben Truck, powered by Weichai WP10.380E32 engine.
