= Mercedes-Benz NG =

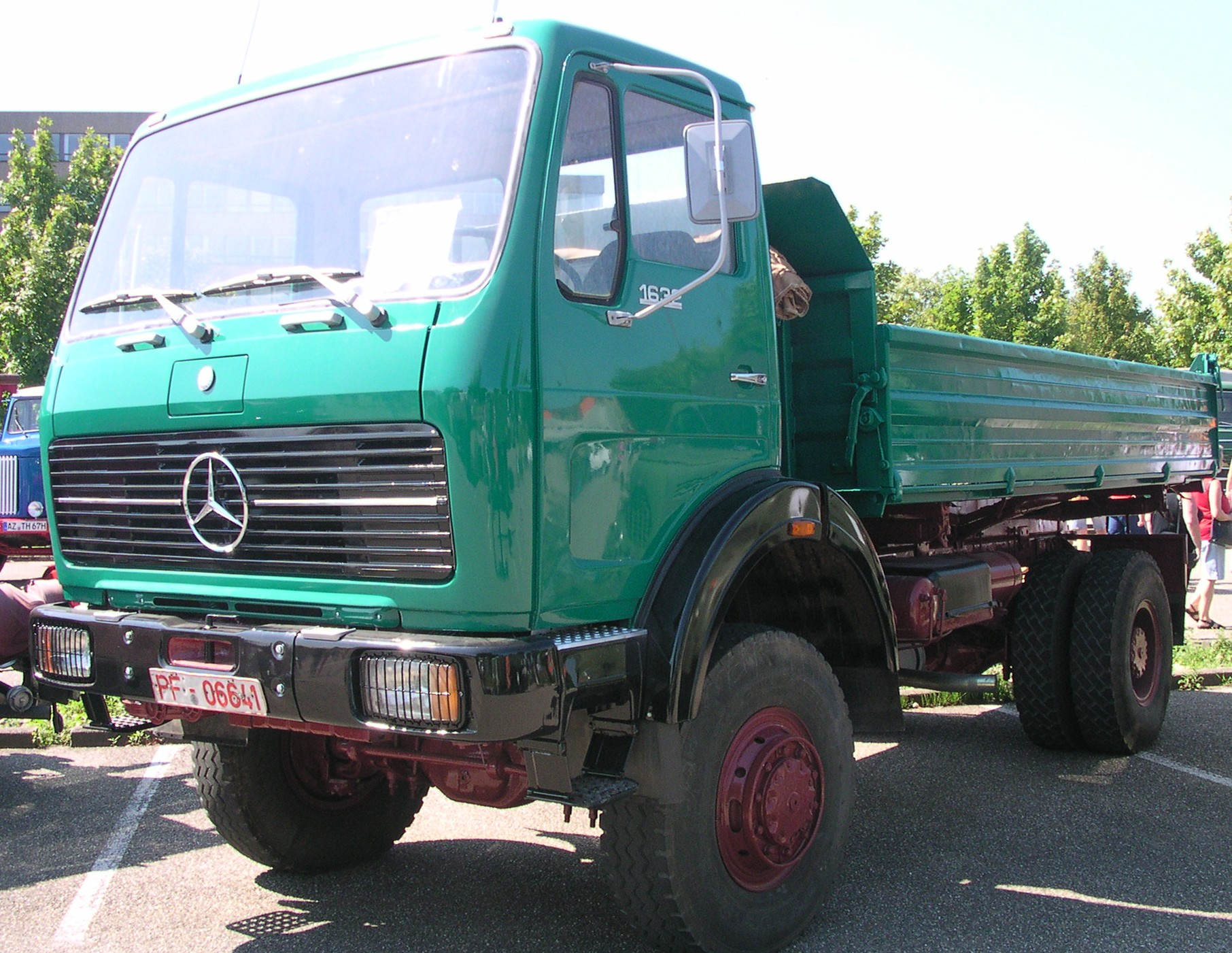

Overview
- Manufacturer: Mercedes-Benz
- Also called: BeiBen Powerstar (China)
- Production: 1973–1988; 1976–present (FAP); 1988–present (BeiBen Truck)

Body and chassis
- Class: cabover truck
- Related: Tata Signa (India)

Powertrain
- Engine: 95−320 kW (130−435 PS)

Dimensions
- Curb weight: 10,000–26,000 kg (22,000–57,300 lb)

Chronology
- Predecessor: Mercedes-Benz LP-series (cubic); Mercedes-Benz L-series (Kurzhauber); Hanomag-Henschel cabover truck Mercedes-Benz LAPK
- Successor: Mercedes-Benz SK

The "New Generation“ is a series of trucks by Daimler-Benz built from 1973 to 1988. It was then replaced by the Mercedes-Benz SK series (Schwere Klasse, "heavy series"). With the "New Generation", Daimler-Benz expanded its market position in the medium and heavy truck segments. Its cab was also used by Mercedes-Benz of North America, who offered it with inline-six or -five engines as the LP series beginning in 1985.

== NG 73 ==
The "New Generation" launched in 1973 was a completely new design with a completely new appearance. The first models to be released were construction site vehicles, followed in 1974 by a version with a 600 mm longer sleeper cabin. As of 1977, three cab variants were available: a short cab (S-Fahrerhaus), a medium cab (M-Fahrerhaus) with narrow rear side windows, and what then was called the Fernverkehrskabine or L-Fahrerhaus, a larger sleeper cabin with two cots. Until 1977, all cabs had narrow front wings, which were then widened on all models when the medium cab was introduced. Medium duty trucks were added to the NG series in 1975 and no longer used different cabs. All cabs now tilted forward for engine access. In 1979, Mercedes added the still somewhat larger Großraum-Fahrerhaus.

The engines were originally two units inherited from the earlier square cab LP-series, plus a new, smaller 192 PS (141 kW) V6 diesel unit for lighter versions. The medium-weight NGs were introduced in 1975, meaning that the entire range had now been switched to the New Generation body. The old heavy-duty LPs had been already taken out of production in 1974. Usually, ZF transmissions were fitted, but other units (such as the Roadranger) were also available.

== NG 80 ==
Starting in 1980, Mercedes offered the NG trucks with a new range of engines from 95 kW/130 hp to 276 kW/375 hp. This generation can be recognized by wind deflectors fitted to the lower front corners of the cabs. In addition, the horizontal chrome bar on the grille was dropped. Model badges and mirror casings were now black. The chassis on semi-trailer tractors was redesigned, lowering it by 120 mm (4.7 in). A fourth cab variant above the L-Fahrerhaus, the GR-Fahrerhaus now was a true long-distance cabin with a raised roof and wardrobe locker. This cab was also wider than the others, noticeable by the flush wheel arches, and no longer had a rear left side window nor rear windows.

There was also a new 18.3 L (18,275 cc; 1,115 cu in) V10 diesel engine; the available turbo version produced 500 PS (368 kW). For some markets (such as Great Britain), a four-axle (8x4) version was also made available in 1985. These began life as three-axle units, and were converted to four axles at the old Saurer plant in Switzerland.

== NG 85 ==
The third and last minor change was introduced in 1985. This was the first version available with the newly introduced electronic power shift (EPS), a computer-aided shift support offered as standard on the 1644 flagship model. EPS was initially offered as an option for the smaller engines and was not available for site vehicles. Mercedes expanded the range of engines by a new top option, the OM 442 LA, a 320 kW (435 PS; 429 hp) V8 with turbo charger and intercooler with 14.6 liters of displacement. The same block was available as the 257 kW (350 PS) OM 442 A without the intercooler. Otherwise the engines remained mostly unchanged. The NG 85 could be recognized by its smaller, square model badges with silver lettering. The dash board received more modern-looking rocker switches instead of the previous push buttons.

== Gallery ==
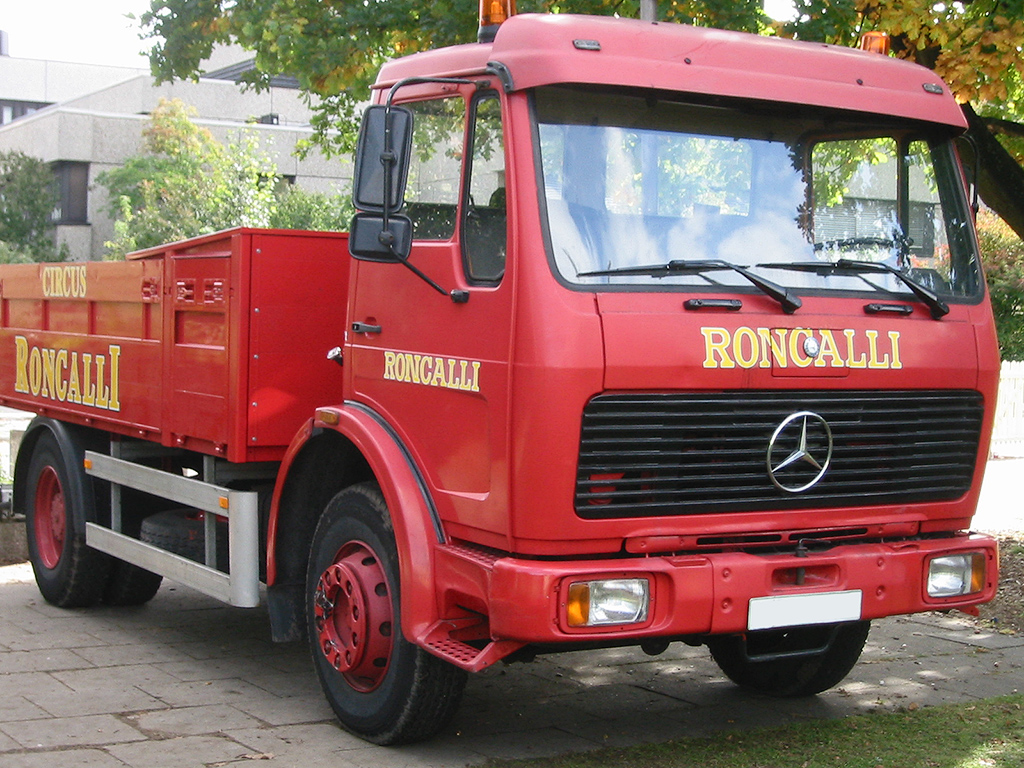
NG 73 (1973−1977)

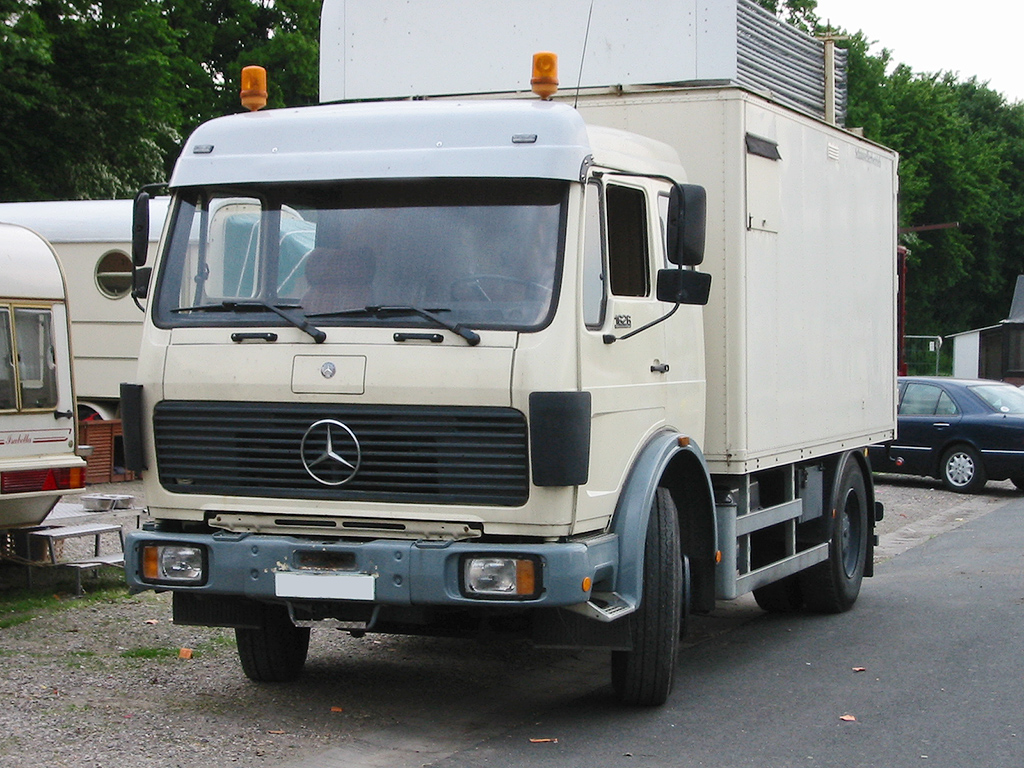
NG 73 (1973−1977), note the narrow front wings

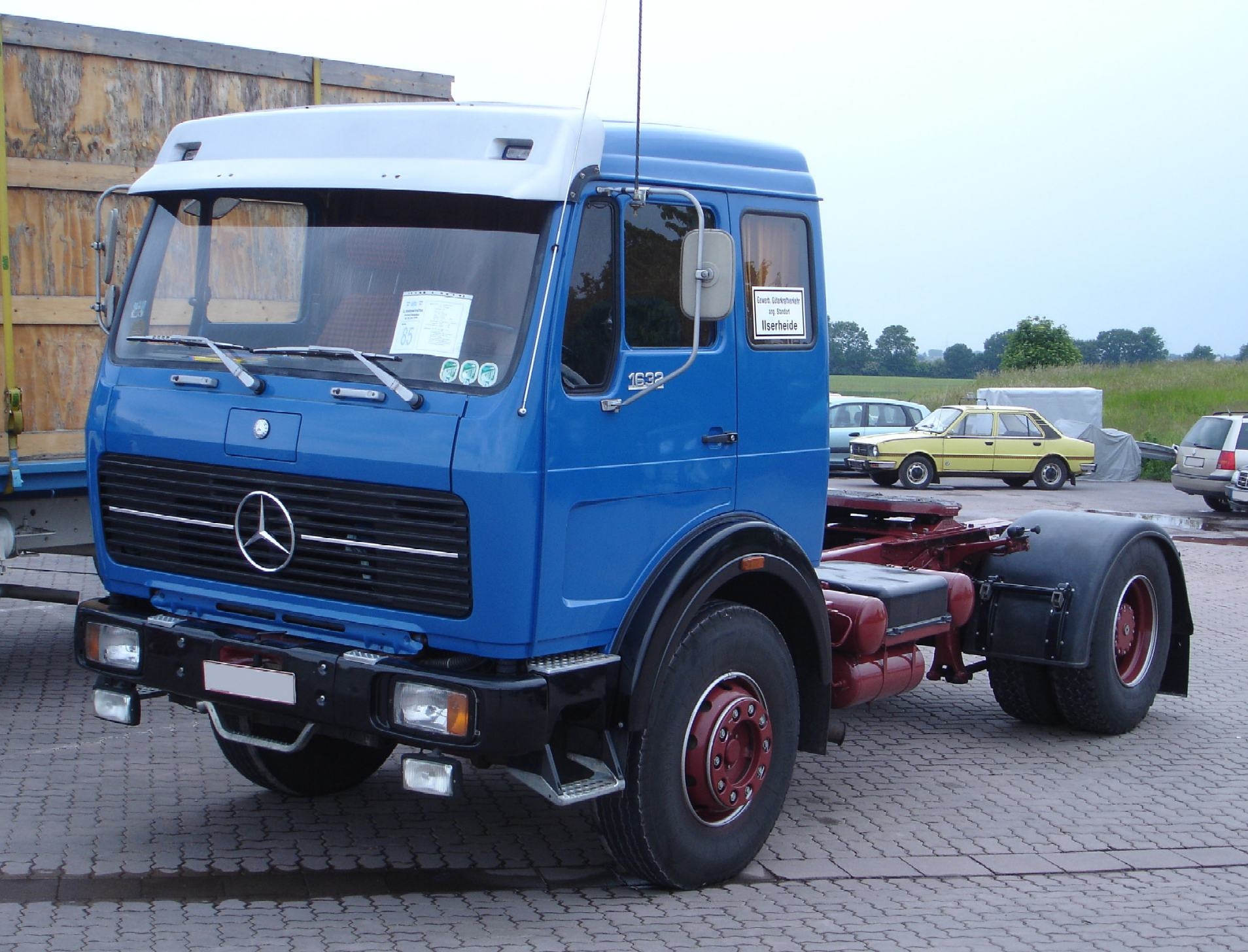
NG 73 (1977−1980), model change as of 1977 with wider front wings

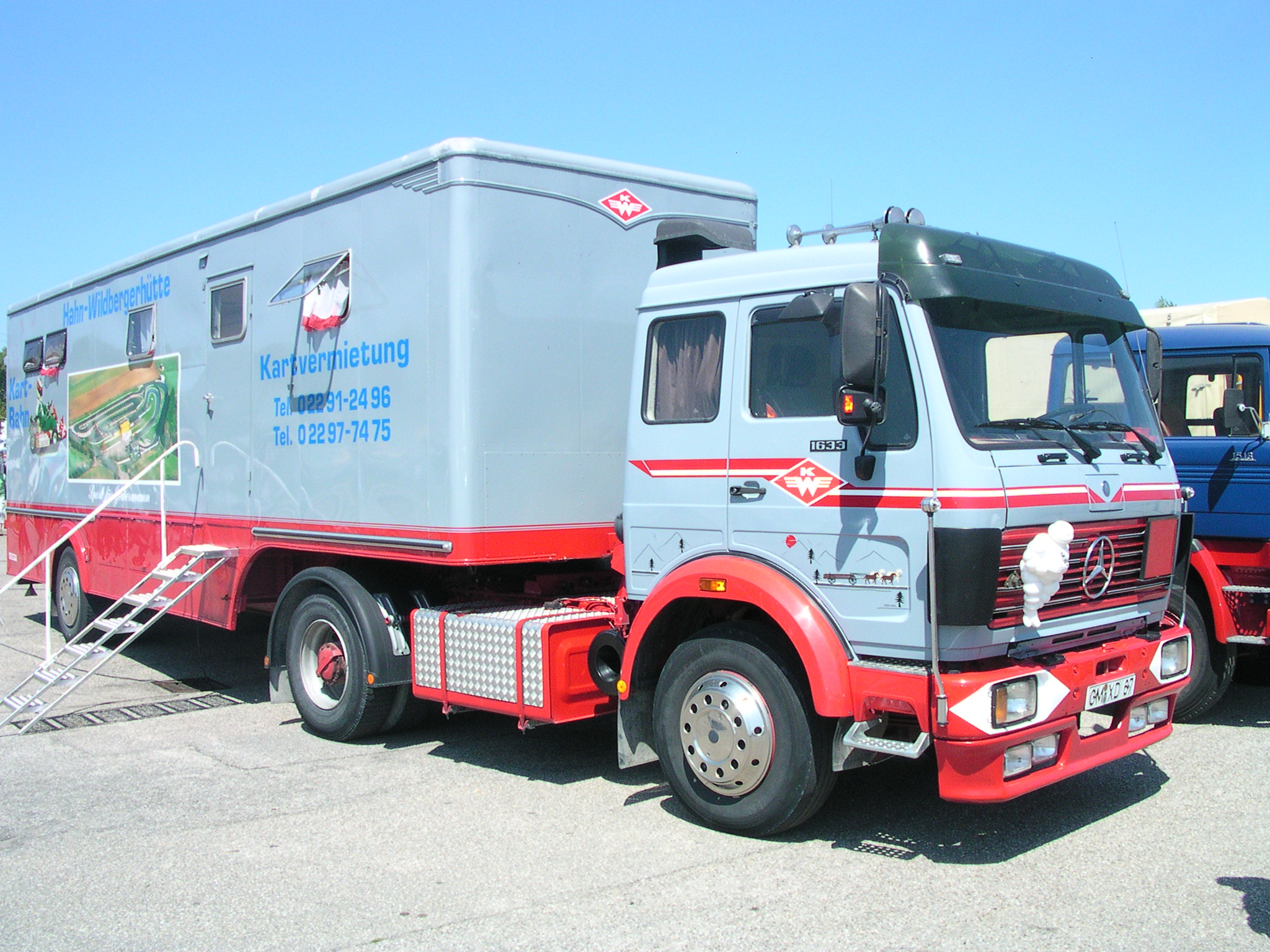
NG 85 (1985–1988)

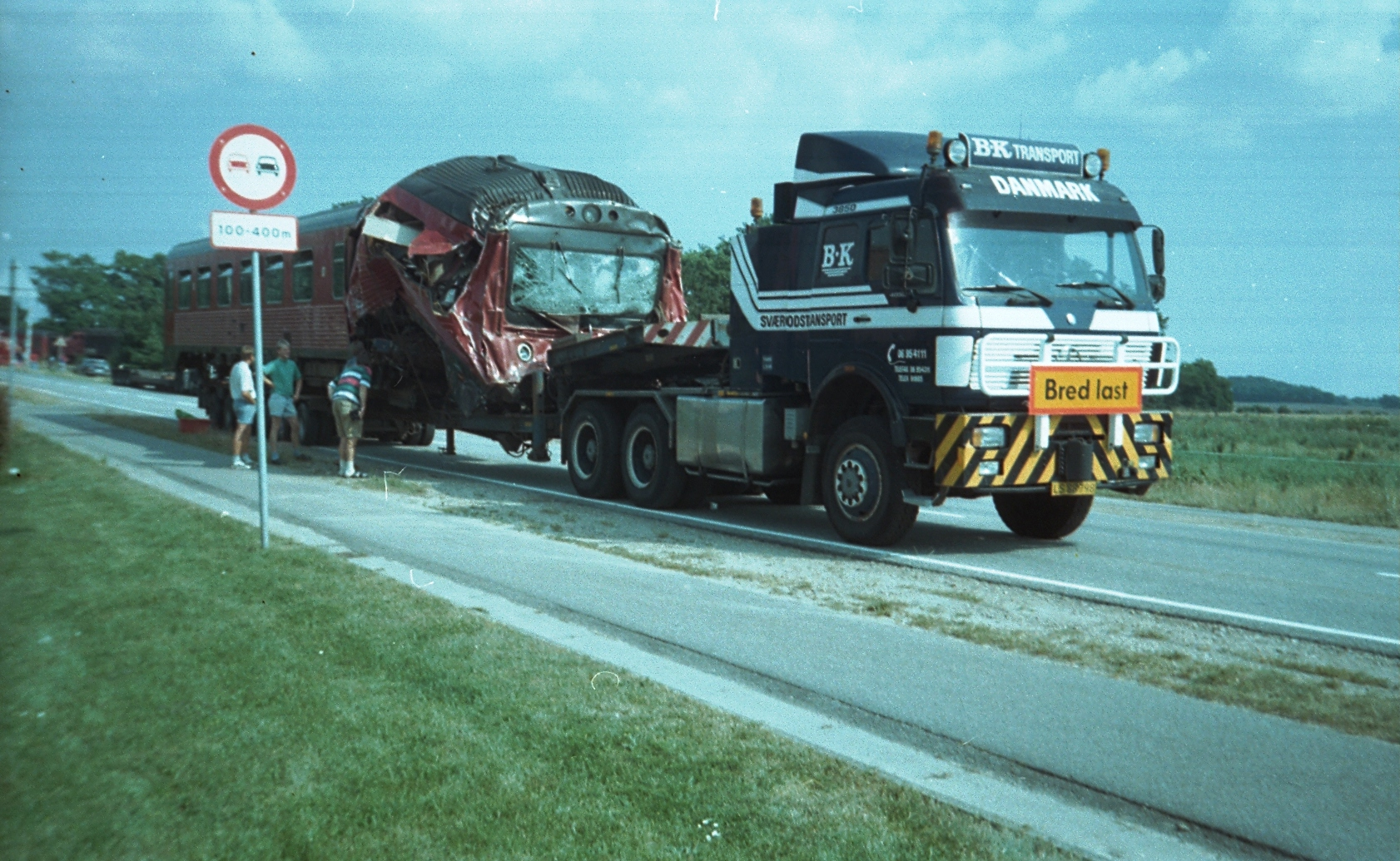
NG 85 6x6 heavy tractor with a damaged rail vehicle

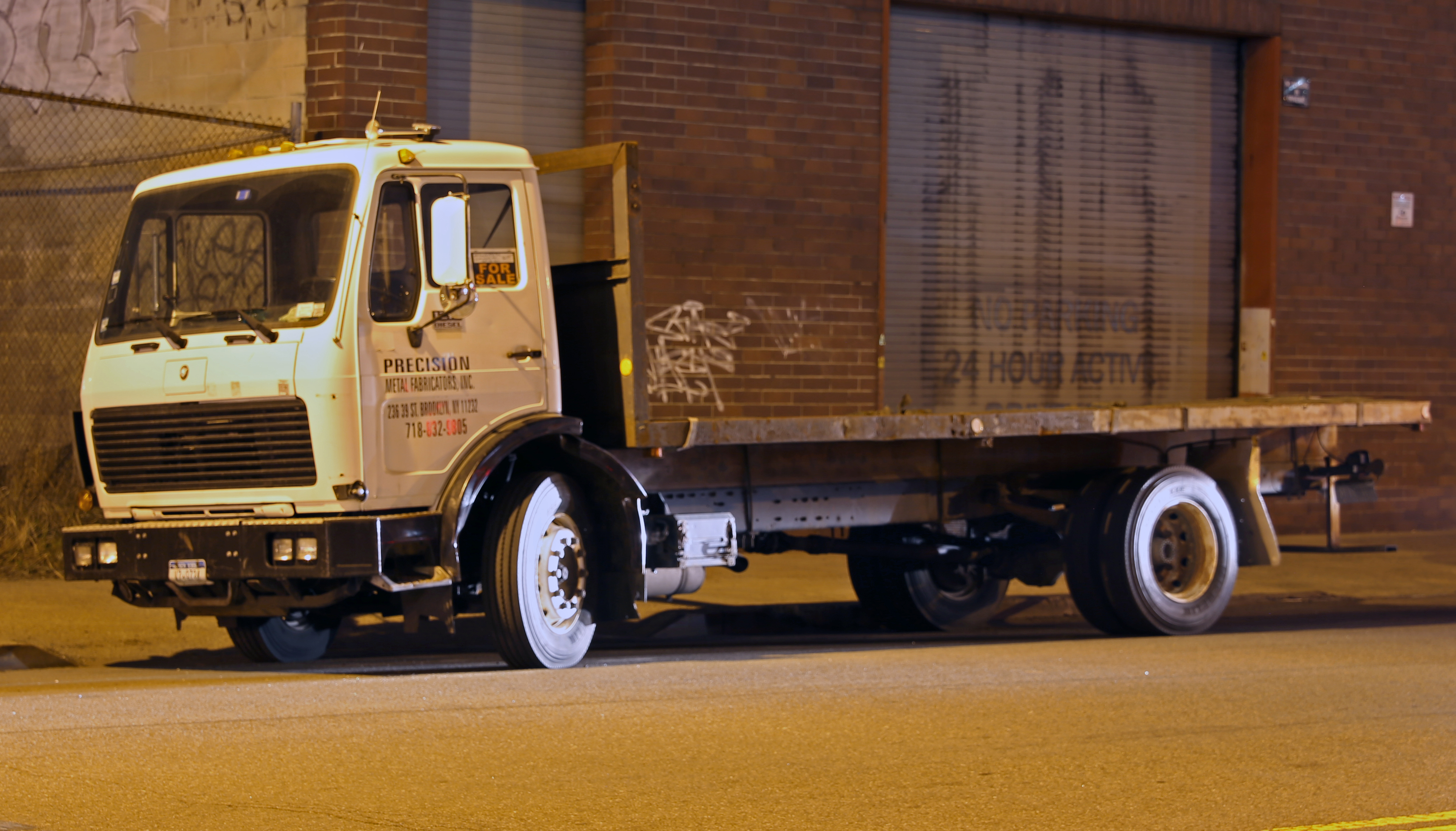
US-built Mercedes LP 1219 (1990) - note sealed beam headlights

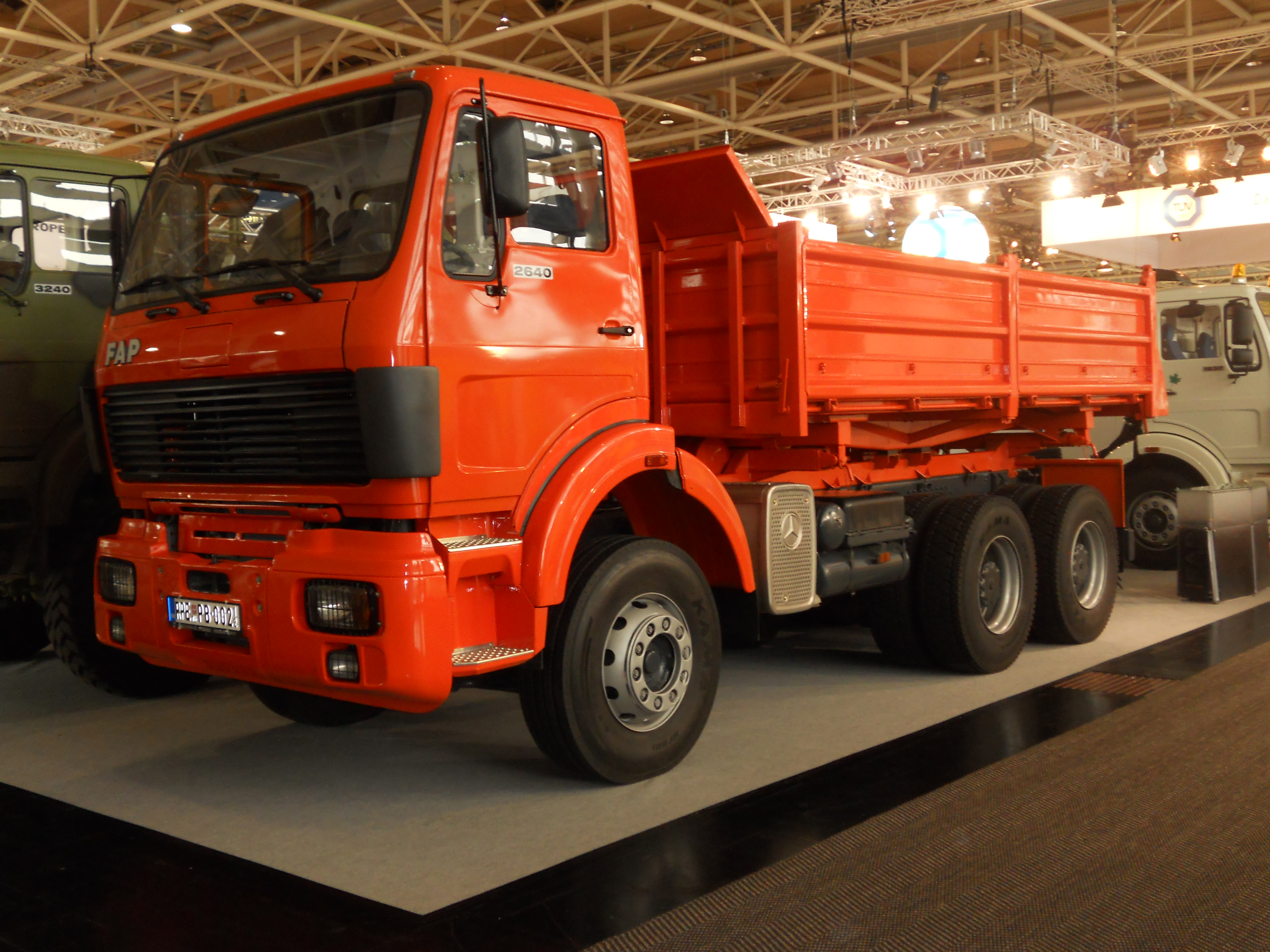
Serbian FAP NG 2640 dump rigid truck three-axle at exhibition IAA 2012 in Hanover, Germany.

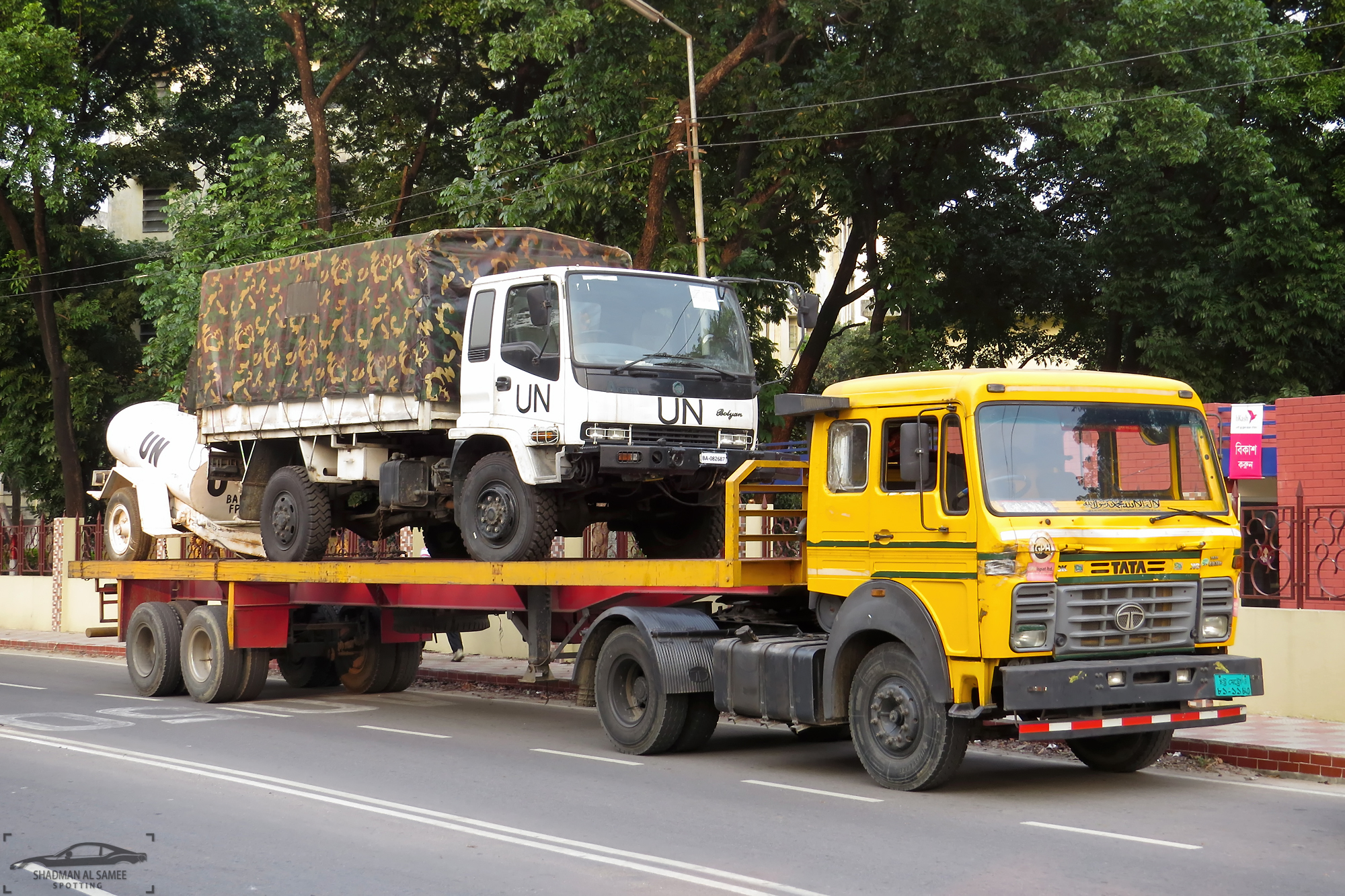
Indian Tata LPS 4018 based on the Mercedes-Benz NG in Bangladesh

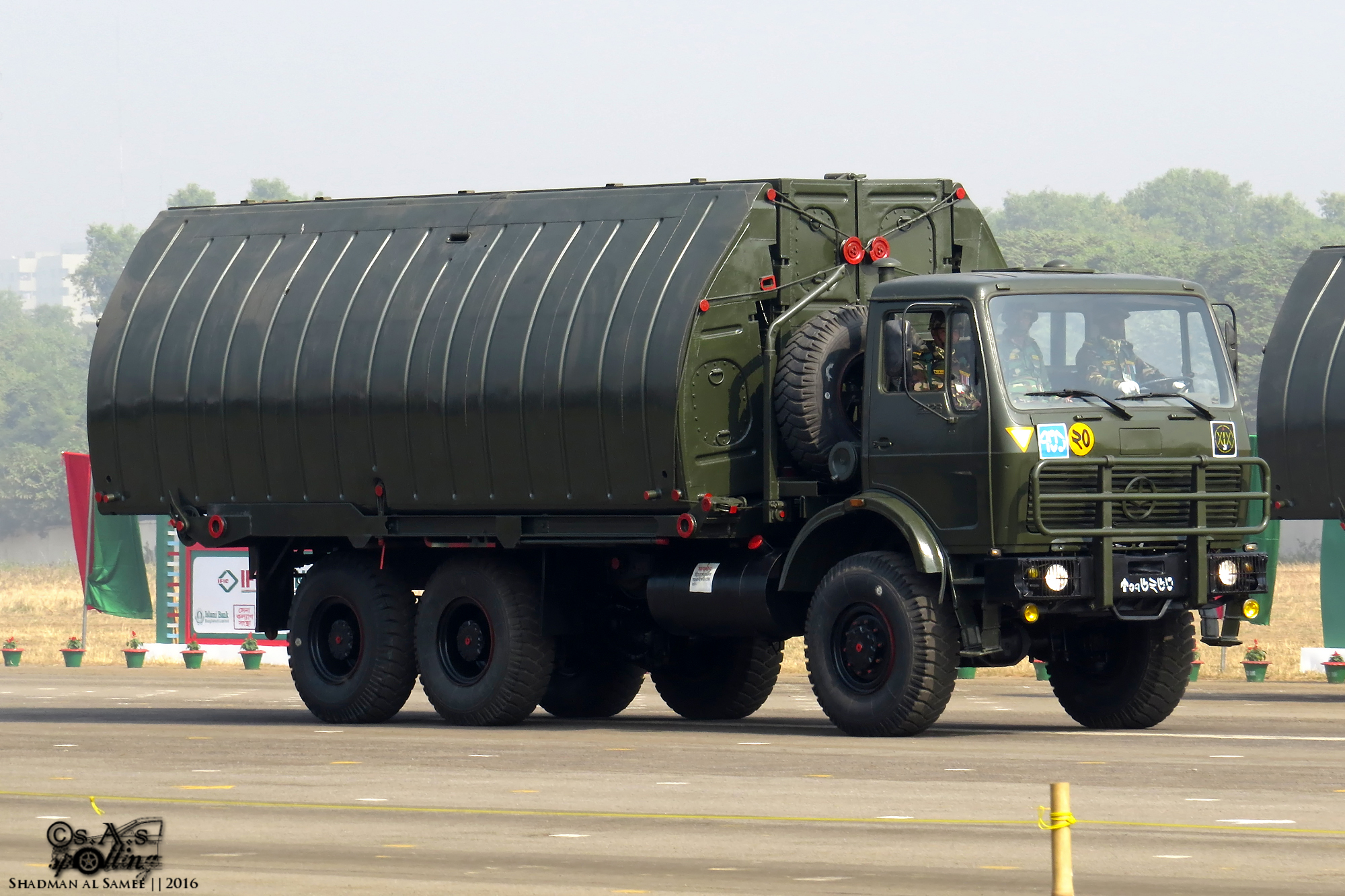
Bangladesh Army Tiema XC2200 based on the Mercedes-Benz NG

== Military vehicles ==
=== Overview ===
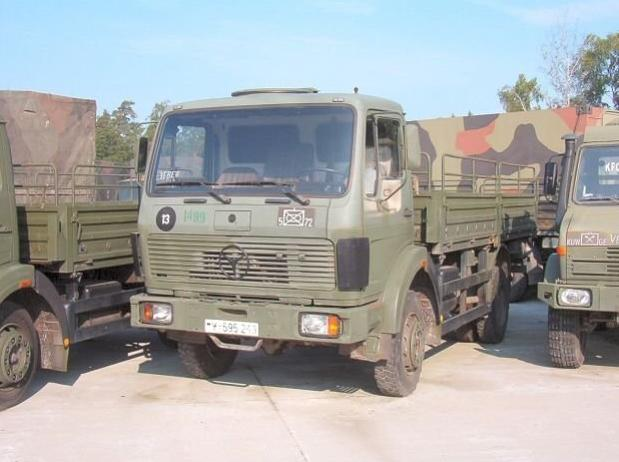
Mercedes-Benz 1017A, Y-595213, of 5 company of the now-disbanded Panzergrenadierbataillon 72 in Hamburg-Fischbek

The "New Generation" was supplied to a number of military organizations. As the Mercedes-Benz 1017, or 1017A, respectively, it was procured by the Bundeswehr as of 1977. The German Army originally intended to obtain up to 22,000 Mercedes-Benz 1017 and 1017A. However, at the same time, Daimler-Benz AG had received an order of about 18,000 U 1300 L (Unimog). This was protested, among others, by workers at Magirus-Deutz, leading to 7,000 Mercedes orders being replaced with units by that manufacturer (or its successor Iveco, respectively). The 1017 model designation stands for the maximum gross weight (10 tonnes) and the engine power (170 PS). Vehicles with selectable all-wheel drive are termed 1017A and carry the army designation "tmil gl" for "teilmilitarisiert geländegängig" (partially militarized, cross-country capable). The last vehicles were delivered in 1988 and many are currently still in service under the tactical designation of "LKW 5t tmil", or "5-Tonner" for short.

=== Technology ===
The military trucks are very similar to the regular Mercedes-Benz civilian version. Partial militarization includes a roof hatch. Also, the wiper, window washer and light switches are different. Early models were "yellow olive", later ones received a colour called "bronze green" or the three-shade camouflage pattern.

The vehicles have a short steel cab with three individual seats. The middle seat can be folded to make a platform, allowing a machine-gunner to man the roof hatch. For more efficient use of the available space, the rear windows have been replaced with additional bustles for the soldiers' personal equipment. The cabin flips for repairs and maintenance and has a manual-hydraulic flip mechanism. Oil and liquids are checked via a front service hatch.

The engine is the Mercedes-Benz OM352 A, a water-cooled six-cylinder in-line diesel with turbocharger and integrated compressor, producing 127 kW/172 hp at 2,800 rpm from a displacement of 5,675 cc. Max torque is 540 Nm at 1,600 rpm. Average fuel consumption is about 20 L per 100 km. At 135 L of tank volume, range comes to about 600−700 km. Power is transmitted to the rear wheels via a pneumatic, synchronized 5-speed gearbox and a hydraulic single-disc dry clutch. The rear axle has a locking differential and the all wheel drive Version has an additional, selectable front wheel drive. Top speed is 93 km/h and 87 km/h for the all wheel drive version.

The truck has drum brakes on all wheels. The air brake system is hydraulically actuated, allowing for soft braking even when cold. A proportioning load device adjusts rear brake force to different loads. In addition, the 1017 has a spring-loaded parking brake on the rear wheels and a wear-free pneumatic engine brake.

The frame is made of U-shaped sections with lateral members. The axles have semi-elliptical leaf springs and telescoping shock absorbers. Maximum wading depth is 500 mm. The vehicles have the usual NATO trailer hitch for offroad trailer pulling, together with two air pressure and one electrical connectors.

Onboard electrics are 24V as is the norm for utility vehicles of this class. They have two 12V batteries connected in series. Some all-wheel drive models also have blackout lights.
