= Mercedes-Benz LP-series (cubic) =

Series of cab-over-engine trucks first shown in 1963

Mercedes-Benz_LP-series
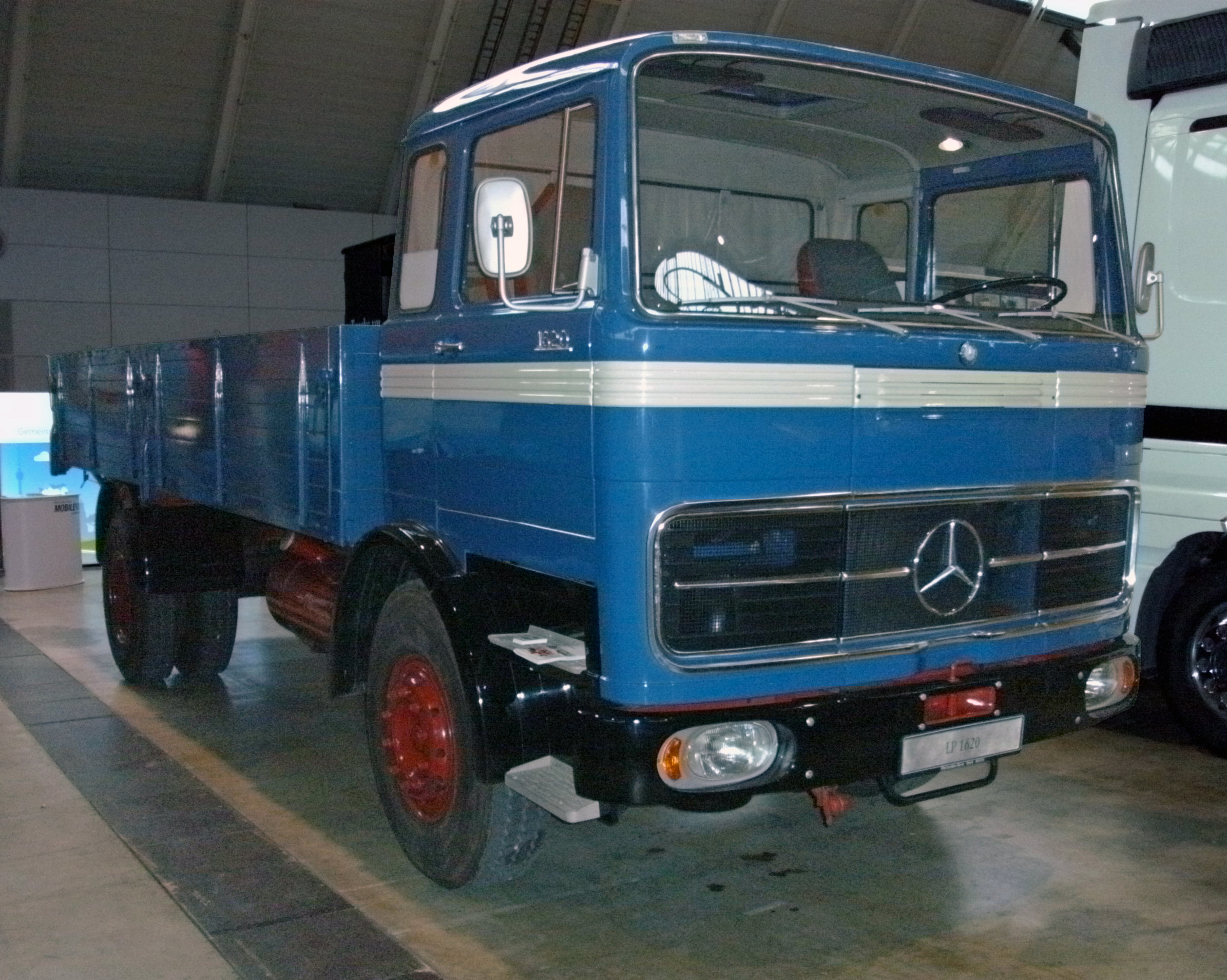

Overview
- Manufacturer: Mercedes-Benz
- Production: 1963–1975

Body and chassis
- Class: cabover truck

Powertrain
- Engine: 74−235 kW (100−320 PS)

Dimensions
- Curb weight: 6,000–26,000 kg (13,200–57,300 lb)

Chronology
- Successor: Mercedes-Benz NG

The Mercedes-Benz LP "cubic" cabin trucks were a series of cab-over-engine trucks first shown in 1963. They are most commonly referred to as the "Kubische Kabine" in German, referring to the squared-off appearance of the cabin. "LP" was also used on the cab-over versions of the preceding range of Mercedes-Benz trucks. The heavy- and medium-duty models had been discontinued by 1975 as the Mercedes-Benz NG range took over, while the lighter portion of the range was only replaced in 1984, by the new LK (Leichte Klasse, "light class"). Mercedes-Benz LP trucks also served as basis for Tata Motors cowl trucks.

== History ==
The new LP range first appeared in 1963, along with a new naming system for Mercedes-Benz trucks as well as a new engine generation. Common for all variants were strong mechanics but an unfortunate reputation for rusting quickly. Some of the early trucks equipped with the new engines also suffered mechanical problems, but these were soon rectified. The cabin was designed to maximize interior space, with a low engine hump, and with large windows all around.

The naming of the trucks followed Mercedes-Benz' new naming strategy: the leading one or two digits signified the gross vehicle weight rating, with the last two digits representing the maximum power in tens of horsepowers (rounded to suit and with a leading zero if necessary). Thus, an LP608 has a total max weight of 6 tonnes (13,000 lb) and an engine producing 80 PS (59 kW), while the LP 1632 is a 16-tonne (35,000 lb) truck with about 320 PS (235 kW). The LP range proved a strong seller, with an increase of German sales for Mercedes-Benz in the heavy truck segment of 153 per cent between 1965 and 1973.

== Light duty ==
The light duty cabin, first introduced in 1965, was used for trucks with GVWs ranging from 6 to 11 tonnes (13,000 to 24,000 lb). These LPs can most easily be distinguished by their low-line grilles, with headlights mounted inside. As with all of the Cubic cabs, they did not have a tilting cabin, both to save costs and to make it more safe in crashes. A series of hatches and doors were to provide access, but the trucks were complicated to service. Only a short daycab was on offer, although independent bodybuilders were at hand to provide any other layouts. The first version introduced was the LP 608, equipped with the 80 PS (59 kW) OM 314 diesel engine. There was also a 7.5-tonne (17,000 lb) version, as well as 8.0-and-8.5-tonne (17,600 and 18,700 lb) ones. In 1969 nine-tonners appeared, fitted with the six-cylinder OM 352 engine with either 110 or 130 PS (81 or 96 kW). The LP 608 was also the first truck to leave the production line in Daimler-Benz newly constructed plant in Wörth.

In 1977 the light range was thoroughly modernized, with a smoothed out cabin and a new grille. The headlights were now mounted below the body, in the front bumper. A version with an air-sprung rear axle was also added. The cabin remained fixed, in a segment where most competitors had moved on to tilting cabs. New ten and eleven tonne models were added, while the output of the smallest OM 314 engine crept up to 85 PS (63 kW). The light portion of the range outlived its heavier counterparts, remaining in production until 1984.

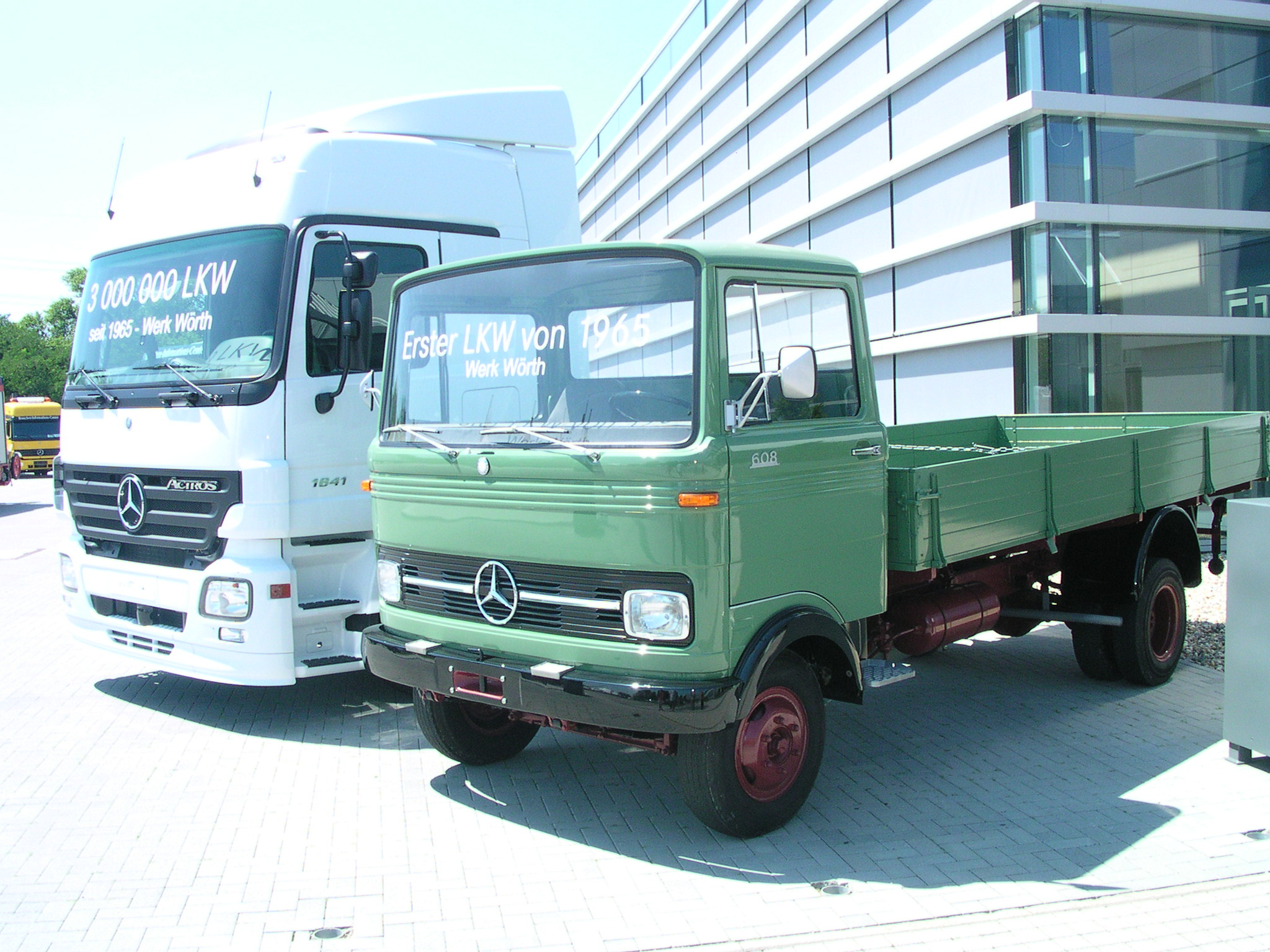
Pre-facelift Mercedes-Benz LP 608 (1965)

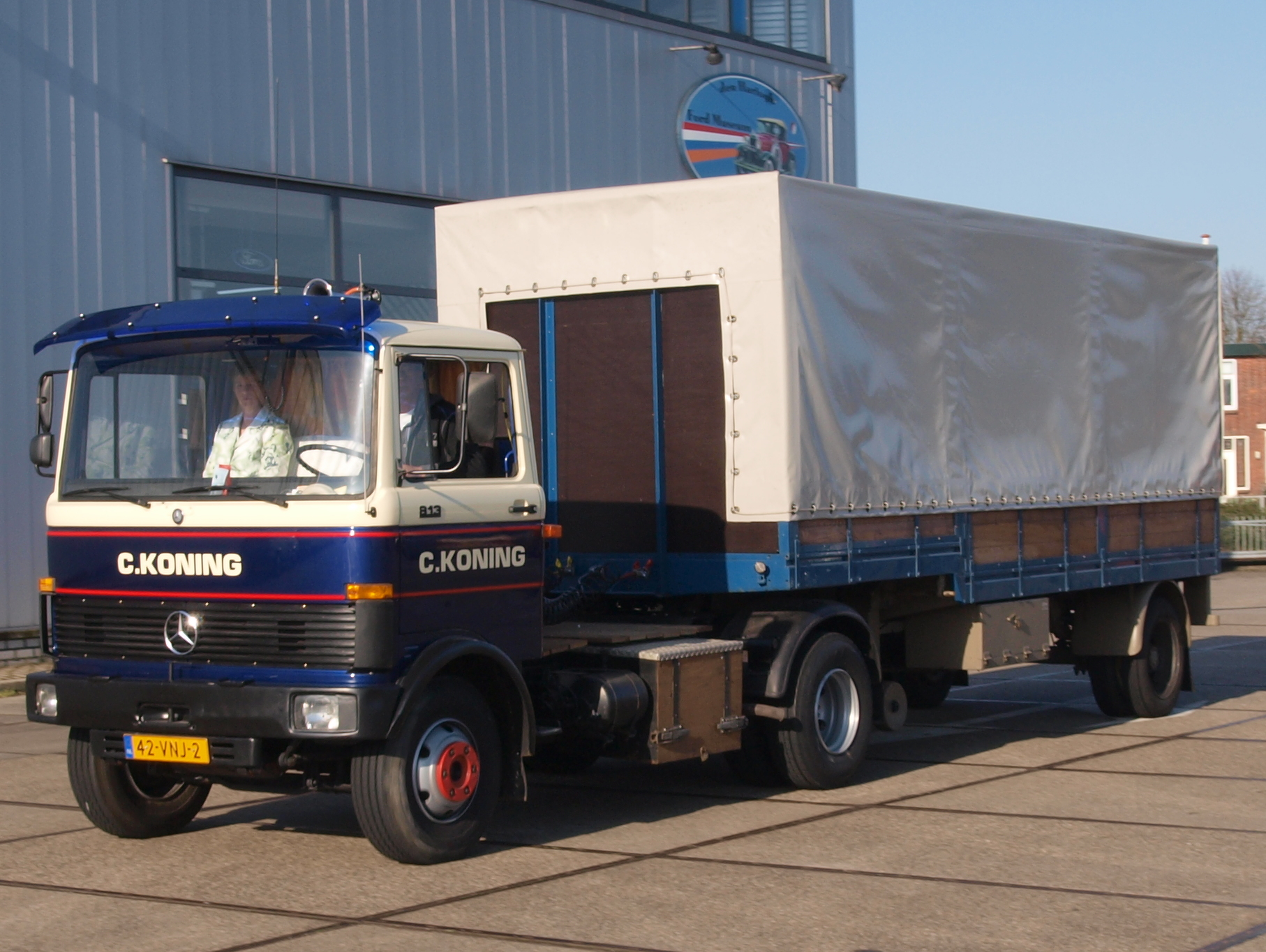
Facelift Mercedes-Benz LPS 813 (tractor)

== Medium duty ==
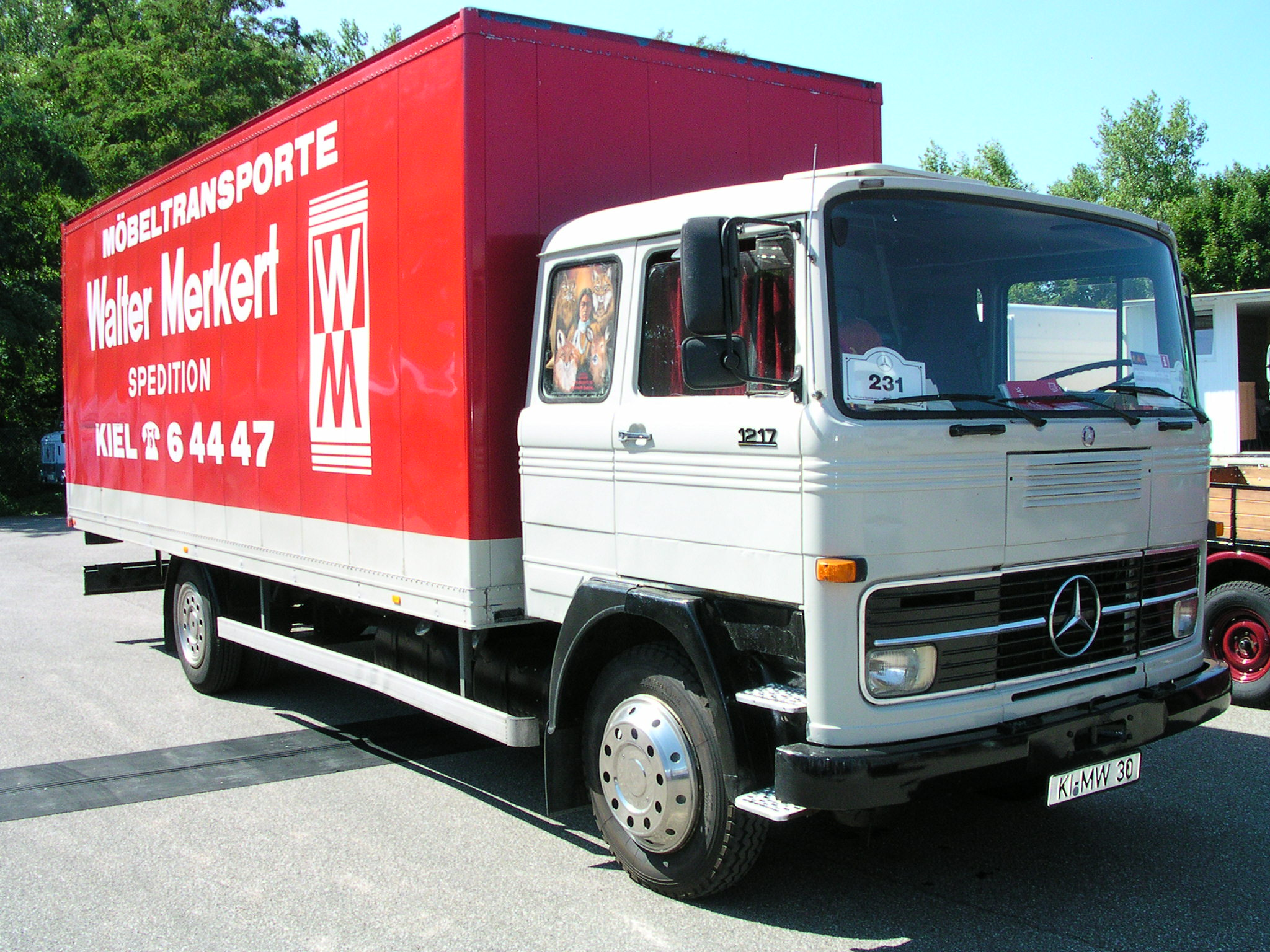
Mercedes-Benz LP 1217

The medium-duty models in the range had GVWs between 8 and 22 tonnes (18,000 and 49,000 lb). A different door arrangement was shared with the heaviest part of the range, while the grille was taller. The headlamps were mounted in the lower half of the grille. Introduced in 1965, it was fully replaced by the Mercedes-Benz NG in 1976. A 200 mm (7.9 in) longer cabin with room for two berths was also introduced in 1965. The non-tilting cabin required a large number of hatches and doors for access to the mechanical parts, which earned the model the less than flattering nickname "Advent Calendar." The underfloor engine installation did allow for a very spacious cabin, however, albeit requiring double height steps for access.

The lighter models received 5675 cc, six-cylinder OM 352 engines with either 100, 110 or 126 PS (74, 81 or 93 kW), while the heavier ones received the 7980 cc OM 327 with 160 PS (118 kW). The most powerful, direct injected OM 352 was later upgraded to 130 PS (96 kW).

Beginning on 1 January 1971, German authorities introduced a minimum power-to-weight ratio of 8 PS/t (5.9 kW/t) for trucks with a GVW of up to 28.5 t (62,800 lb); this was extended to apply to all trucks from 1 January 1972. Mercedes-Benz accordingly revised the middleweights' weight ratings and engines in 1970, to suit the new regulations. While the heavier range was facelifted, the medium duty models only received mechanical upgrades, while the appearance remained mostly the same. Some more powerful engines were also introduced, as in the 8720 cc OM 360 with 170 or 192 PS (125 or 141 kW), fitted to the LP 1517 and 1519. A particularly heavy-duty version using this engine, the LP 2219, was available from 1972 until 1977 in either 6x4 or 6x2 configurations.

== Heavy duty ==
The heavy-duty models were the first to be introduced, in late 1963. They have GVWs between 14 and 22 tonnes (31,000 and 49,000 lb). Their cabin is similar to that of the later middleweight trucks, although the oval headlamps were mounted in the bumper beneath the body. They were fairly spartanly equipped, in particular the absence of a suspended seat. Mercedes-Benz countered with a suspended cabin, but this was often not enough to provide driver comfort in practice. Much of the technology was adapted from the preceding L/LP series, including the 200 PS (147 kW) OM 326 diesel straight-six. In 1964 this was replaced with the all-new 210 PS (154 kW) OM 346 direct injection diesel, an engine that ran smoother and was more durable (after some early problems). Outputs soon crept up to 230 PS (169 kW) and then to 240 PS (177 kW) to meet new regulations which took effect on 1 May 1965. An overall weight of 38 tonnes (84,000 lb) for tractor-trailers coupled with the minimum 6 PS/tonne (max 373 lb/hp) made this necessary.

From 1 January 1972, the minimum power requirement increased to 8 PS/tonne (max 280 lb/hp). Mercedes-Benz responded with a new generation of diesel engines in a V-layout. These, however, required a tilting cabin and thus the heavy trucks were finally thus equipped. A 320 PS (235 kW) V10 OM 403 was enough for the heaviest loads, while a 256 PS (188 kW) V8 was perfect for the 32 tonnes (71,000 lb) category. The 1970 LP-series received new doors that went down deeper, eliminating the exposed steps and many of the various hatches. The roof was higher, and the front turn signals moved outwards so as to be visible from the sides of the truck. The smaller versions continued with the old cab. The heaviest models featured a lot of parts that were developed for the succeeding New Generation trucks, and are sometimes called the "Between Generation" (Zwischen-Generation). Towards the end of production of the V10 trucks, they received newly developed planetary axles as the earlier designs could not quite handle the V10's torque.

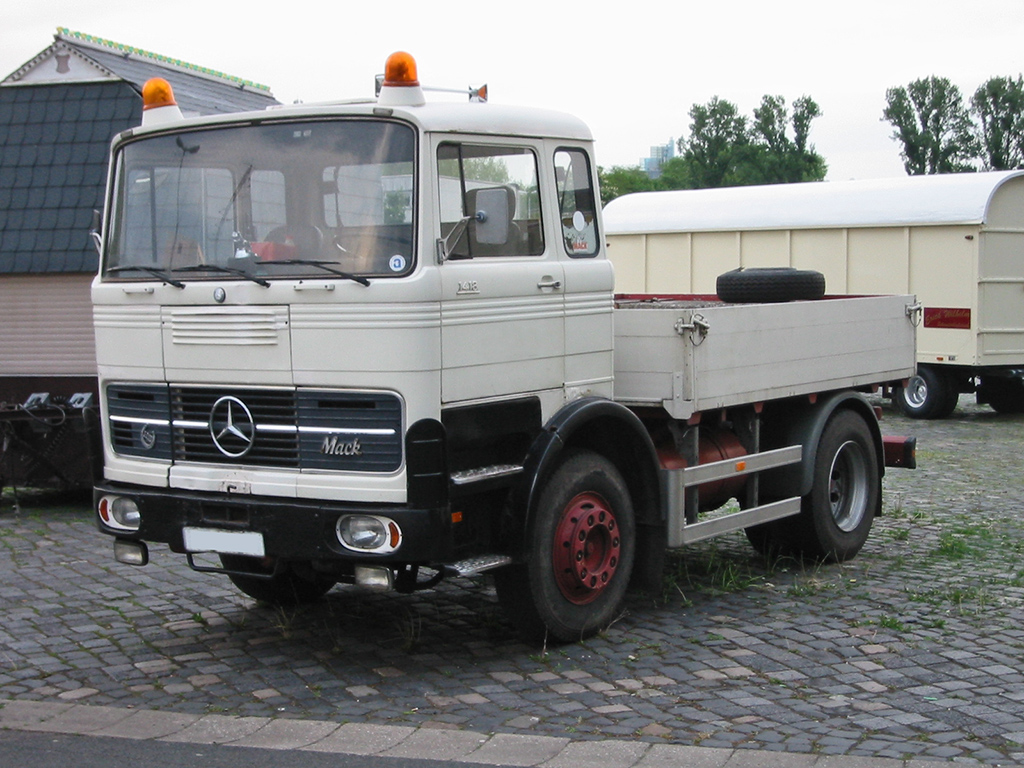
Mercedes-Benz LP 1418 (1963-1974)

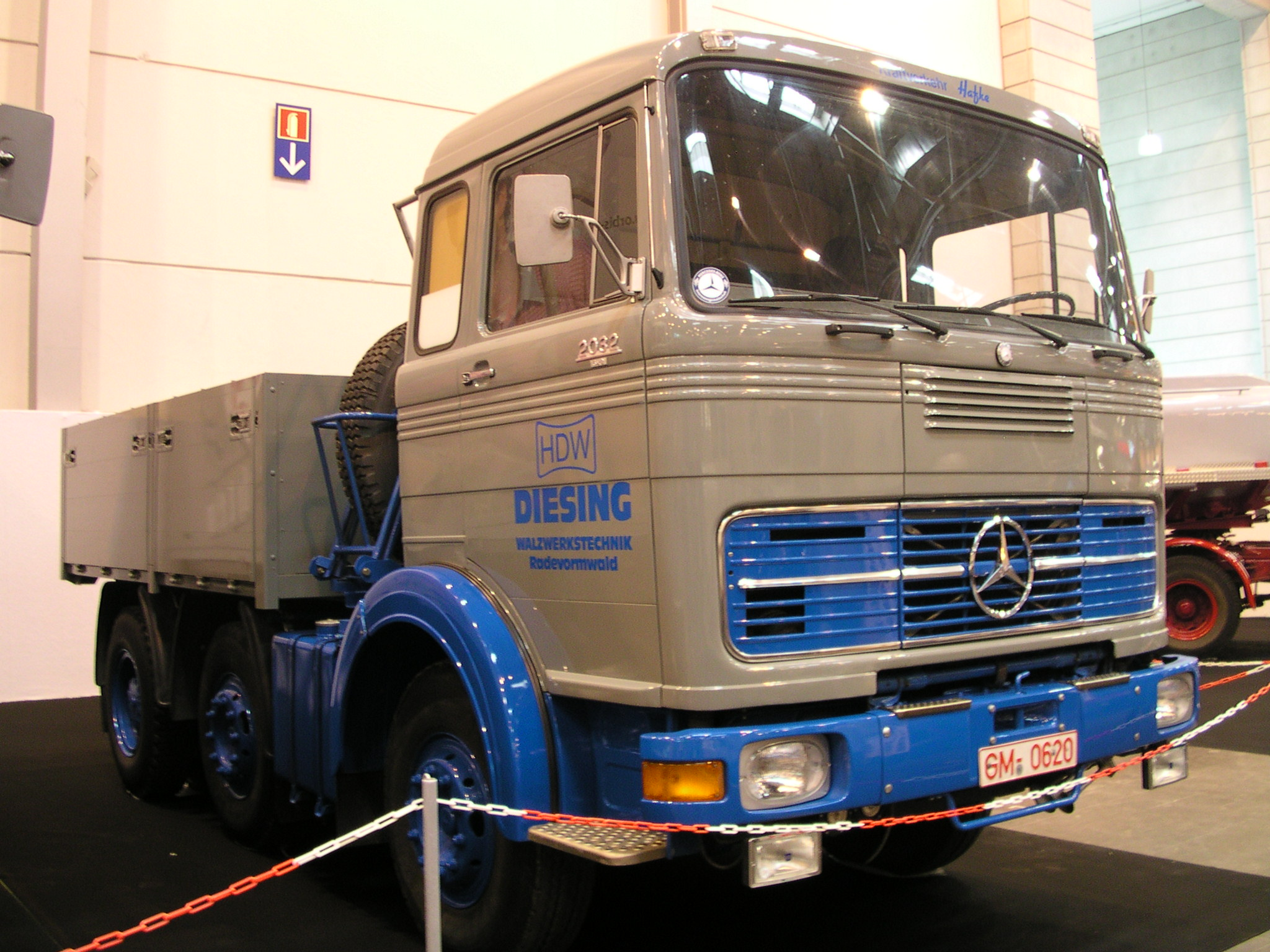
Mercedes-Benz LPS 2032 (1970-1974)
