= Mercedes-Benz LAPK =

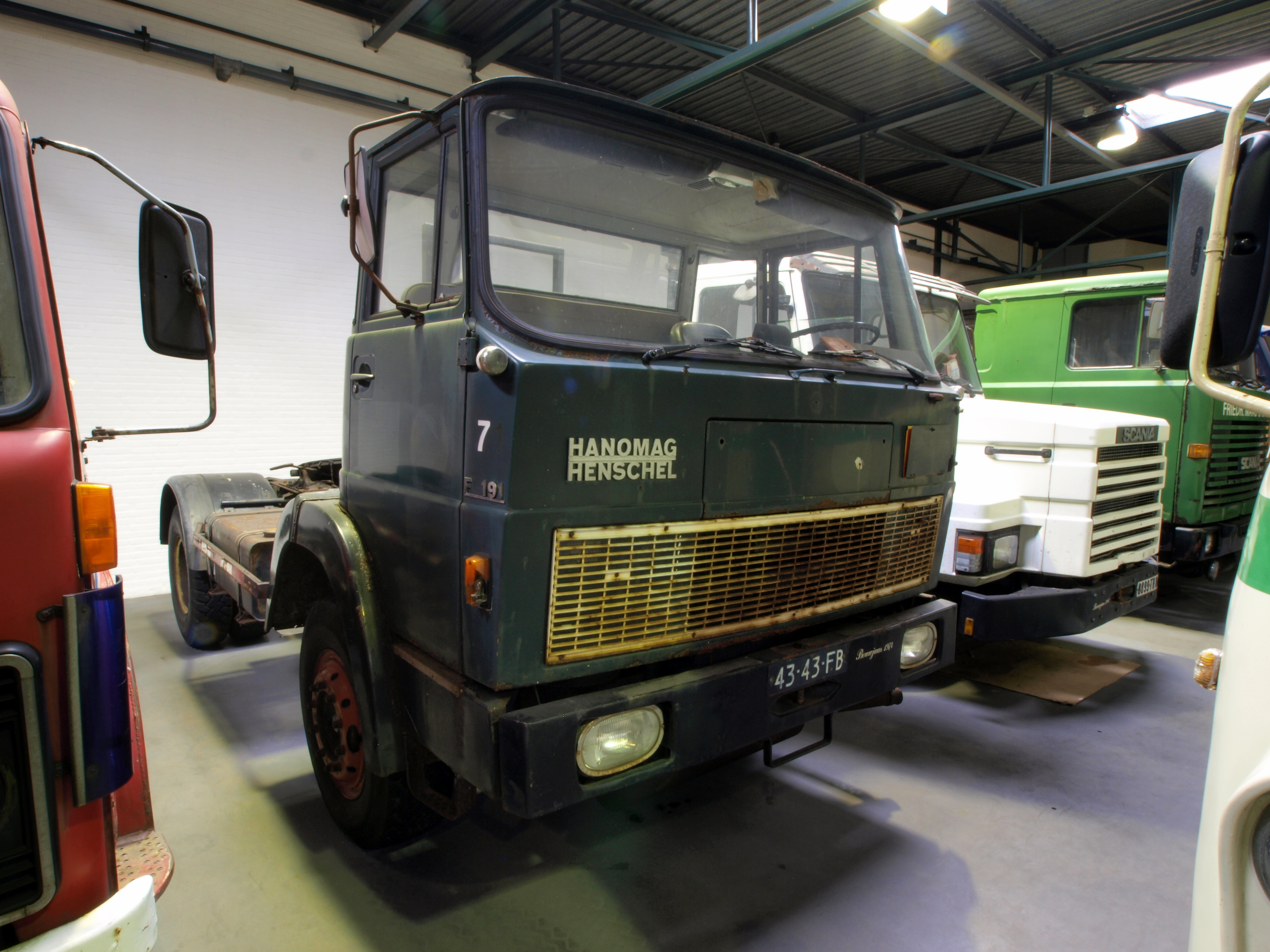

Overview
- Manufacturer: Mercedes-Benz
- Production: 1969–1974

Body and chassis
- Class: cabover truck
- Related: Hanomag-Henschel F261/F263

Powertrain
- Engine: 188−235 kW (256−320 PS)

Dimensions
- Curb weight: 16,000–26,000 kg (35,300–57,300 lb)

Chronology
- Predecessor: Hanomag-Henschel F261; Hanomag-Henschel F263
- Successor: Mercedes-Benz NG

The LAPK is a series of trucks by Daimler-Benz (Mercedes-Benz) built from 1969 to 1974. It was then replaced by the Mercedes-Benz NG series.

== History ==
In 1968, Hanomag (acquired in 1952 by Rheinstahl) and Henschel (acquired in 1964 by Rheinstahl) truck divisions were merged into Hanomag-Henschel. In 1968 Daimler-Benz bought 51% of the shares of Hanomag-Henschel and at the end of 1970 the rest 49% of the shares. Mercedes-Benz LAPK was basically re-branded Hanomag-Henschel F261 / F263 truck. It was replaced and integrated into the Mercedes-Benz NG product range.

== Name system ==
LAPK 2632
L = truck
A = all-wheel drive
P = cab-over-engine
K = tipper
26 = curb weight (16T or 26T)
32 = engine horsepower rating x10 (26 = 256HP / 32 = 320HP)

== Models ==
Model	Curb weight		Engine	Produced	Ref
Mercedes-Benz LAPK 1626	16T	4x4	OM402		
Mercedes-Benz LAPK 1632	16T	4x4	OM403	577	
Mercedes-Benz LAPK 2626	26T	6x6	OM402		
Mercedes-Benz LAPK 2632	26T	6x6	OM403	505	
