= BeiBen Truck =

Chinese truck manufacturer

BeiBen Truck (Baotou BeiBen Heavy-Duty Truck Co.)
- Native name: 北奔重型汽车集团有限公司
- Founded: 1988
- Headquarters: Baotou, Inner Mongolia, China
- Products: Trucks
- Parent: North Industries Group Corporation (NORINCO)
- Website: http://www.beiben.cn/

BeiBen Truck (Baotou BeiBen Heavy-Duty Truck Co.) is a heavy-duty truck manufacturer based in Baotou, Inner Mongolia, China. BeiBen (transl. North Benz) is part of the North Industries Group Corporation (NORINCO), and was founded in 1988 when BeiBen signed an agreement with Daimler-Benz to manufacture Mercedes-Benz Trucks. Mercedes was to deliver complete knock-down kits for assembly by BeiBen, and within a few years, the trucks would contain 90% domestic parts. By 2010, BeiBen was building 40,000 trucks a year.

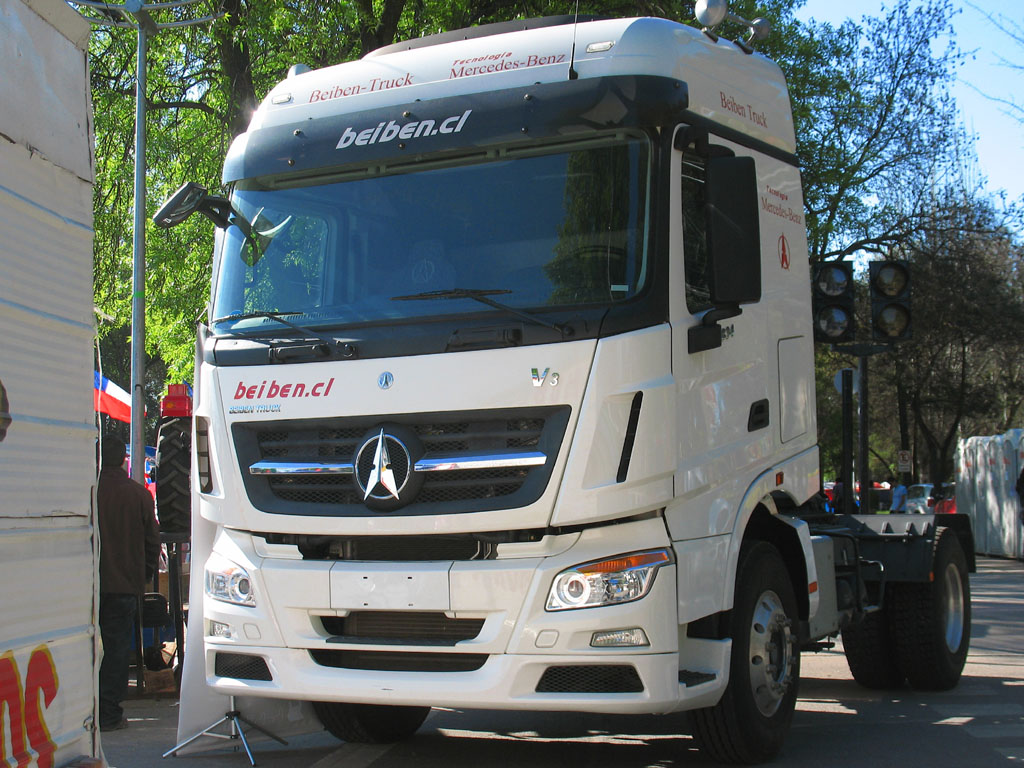
BeiBen V3 1834 2014

The company also manufactures Mercedes-Benz licensed truck axles for use by other manufacturers.

In 2012, BeiBen established production in South Africa and Ethiopia. In Pakistan, Heavy Industries Taxila have been producing the Prime Mover V3 in a joint venture.

In 2014, at the IAA Hannover, a BeiBen V3 prime-mover equipped with the ZF-Astronic gearbox was exhibited by ZF.

In April 2018, Beiben exhibited the first Euro-VI compliant trucks at the Beijing Autoshow Exhibition. Singapore became the 1st country to receive the new Euro-VI trucks.

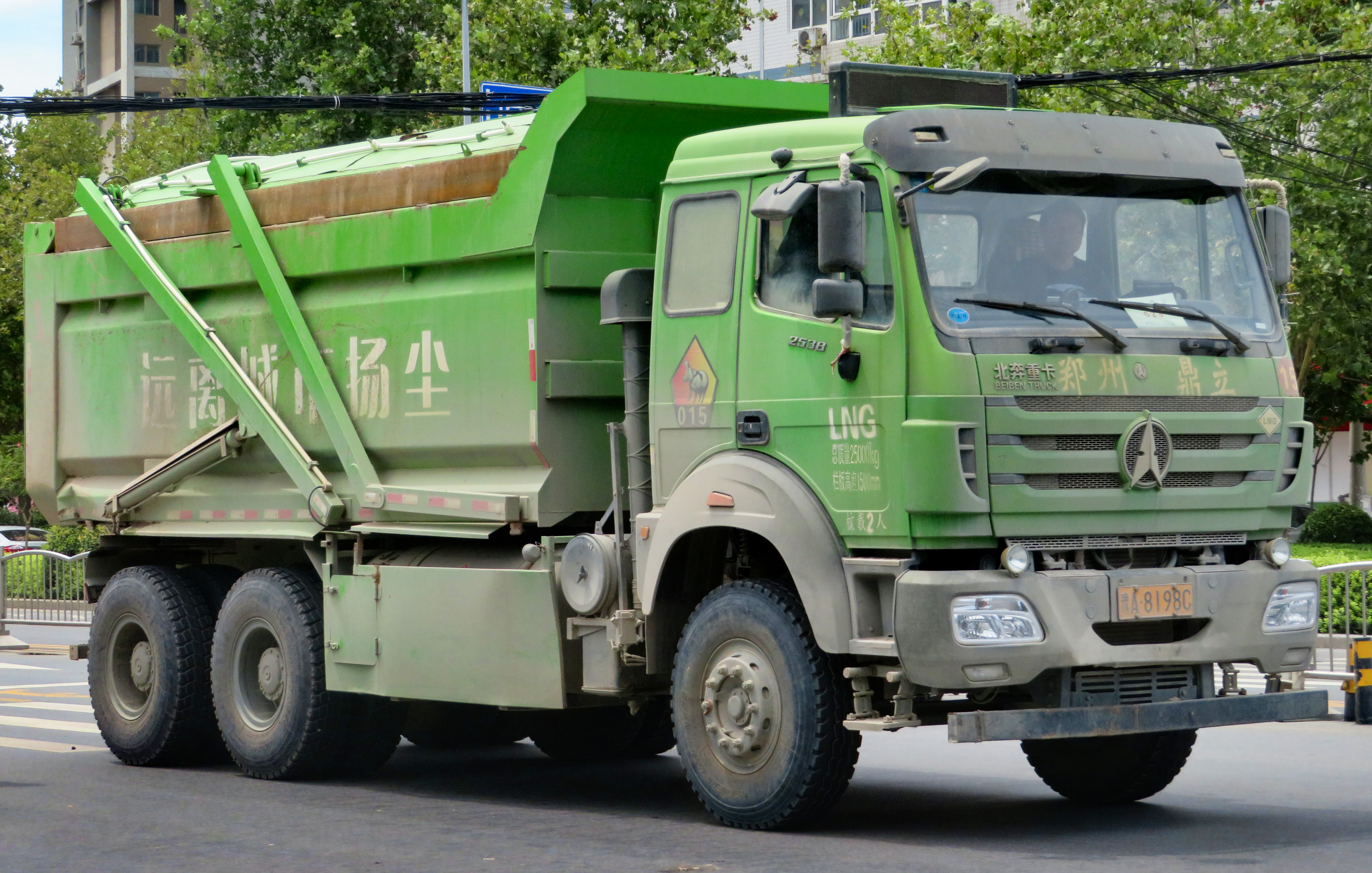
BeiBen 2538 dump truck in Zhengzhou, Henan province, China

== Models ==
- BeiBen V3
- BeiBen NG80
- NG80B
- BeiBen KK Mining Dump Truck
- Tiema
- XC2200

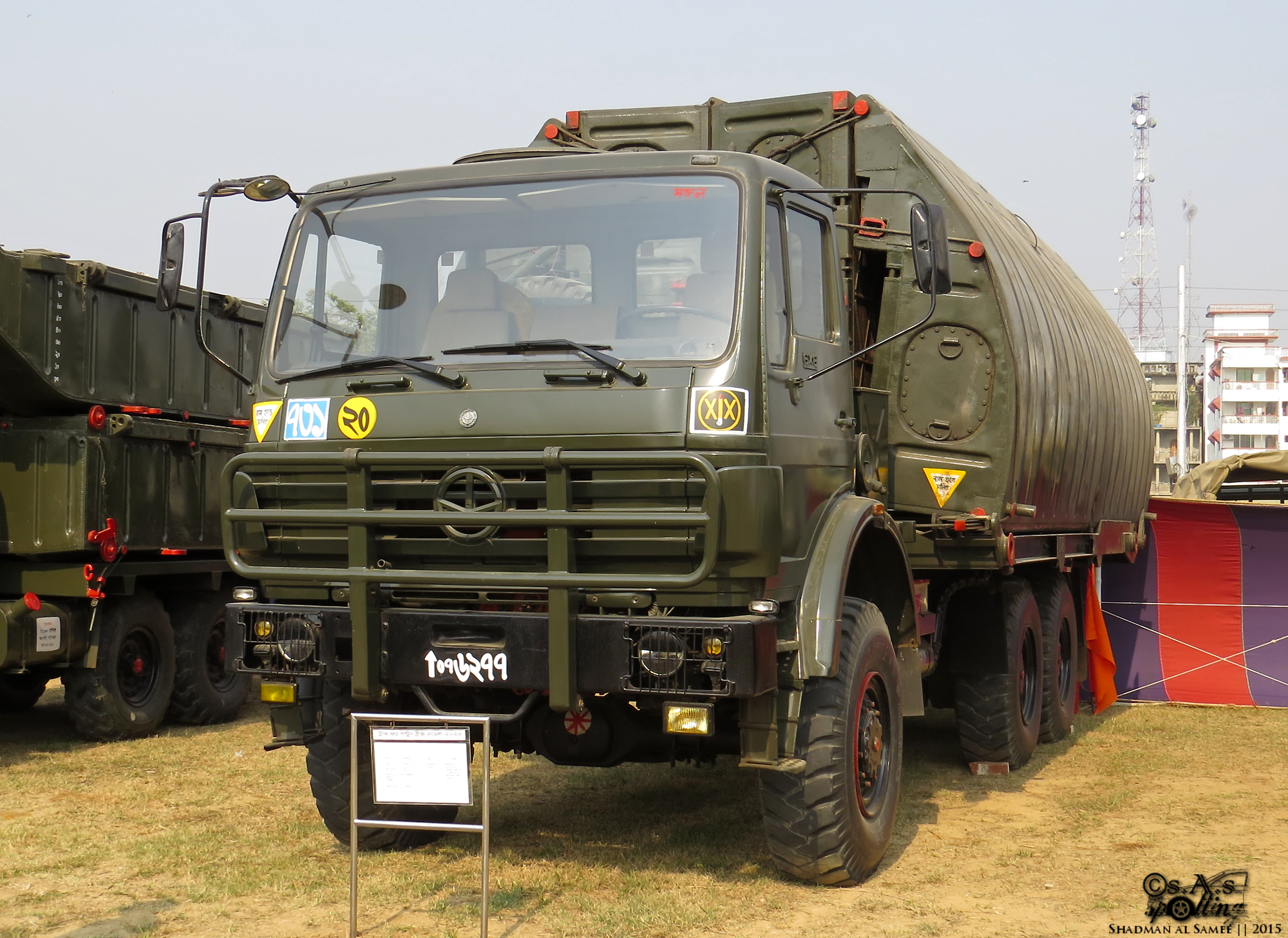
Bangladesh Army Type 79A ribbon bridge on Tiema XC2200 truck.

== Specifications ==
Traditionally, Beiben trucks are equipped with Weichai engines and Fuller FAST transmissions in most markets. Certain models are also equipped with the ZF 16S151 transmission and Deutz air-cooled engines.

ZF and Beiben has a joint venture in Chongqing China, to manufacture ZF Beiben Drivetech transmissions.

The first Beiben Euro-5 truck is equipped with a Euro-5 Weichai WP12-430 engine, coupled with a ZF-Beiben 9T2280 transmission.

The first Automated Manual Transmission (AMT) BEIBEN trucks are equipped with the FAST 16JZSD200 transmission, Euro-5 Weichai engine, successfully delivered to Singapore.

The first Beiben Euro-VI compliant trucks are equipped with a Weichai WP13-500 engine, with a FAST 12JZSD240 AMT transmission, delivered to the local users in Singapore.
