= Gastonia Parts Manufacturing Plant =

- Built: 1978–1979
- Operated: 1979–present
- Location: 1400 Tulip Drive; Gastonia, North Carolina, United States
- Coordinates: 35°17′16″N 81°12′18″W
- Industry: Automotive
- Products: parts
- Volume: 230,000 square feet (21,000 m^{2})
- Owner: Freightliner Trucks (Daimler Truck North America)

Gastonia Parts Manufacturing Plant is a Freightliner parts manufacturing plant in Gastonia, North Carolina, owned by Daimler Truck North America.

== History ==
The plant was opened in May 1979 when Freightliner constructed a new plant in Gastonia, North Carolina.

In 1998, following the merger of Freightliner's parent company Daimler-Benz and Chrysler, the UAW attempted to organize workers at the plant, pointing to neutrality agreements. Workers at the Gastonia plant narrowly accepted a UAW representation election in March 2002 by a margin of 24 votes.

The UAW eventually organized the Gastonia parts plant (along with the Cleveland truck plant in Cleveland, North Carolina) in January 2003 using a card-check agreement after workers signed authorization cards in favor of representation.

In October 2008, Freightliner laid off 550 workers at the plant. On March 13, 2009, the company also laid off 275 shop positions at the plant.
