= Portland Truck Manufacturing Plant =

- Operated: 1942–2026
- Location: 6936 North Fathom Street; Portland, Oregon, United States
- Coordinates: 45.5739°N 122.7144°W
- Industry: Automotive
- Products: trucks
- Employees: 375 (2026)
- Owner: Freightliner Trucks (Daimler Truck North America)

Portland Truck Manufacturing Plant was a Freightliner truck manufacturing plant in Portland, Oregon, owned by Daimler Truck North America.

== History ==
In August 2000, Freightliner announced it will discontinue its third shift at the Portland, Oregon, truck manufacturing plant, laying off employees at the plant as heavy-duty truck sales slowed.

On October 12, 2001, Freightliner LLC announced sweeping job cuts as part of an $850 million restructuring plan following an economic downturn. This included cutting at least 400 white-collar jobs at its headquarters and laying off 321 workers at the Portland parts plant, which was scheduled to close by mid-2002.

In 2008, Daimler announced it will close its Freightliner truck manufacturing plant in Portland, Oregon, by June 2010. The closure was later reversed in late 2009.

On January 30, 2009, Daimler laid off 190 employees at the Portland Swan Island plant driven by plunging demand during the recession.

In 2022, the plant began production of the battery-electric Freightliner eCascadia Class 8 truck. In 2023, it also began production of the battery-electric Freightliner eM2 medium-duty truck.

In 2026, Daimler Truck North America announced it will permanently close its historic Swan Island truck manufacturing plant in Portland, Oregon, on October 30th of the year, and will lay off 375 employees at the plant, ending 84 years of local manufacturing.

== Products made ==
- Freightliner eCascadia (2022–2026)
- Freightliner eM2 (2023–2026)
- Western Star X-Series
