= Freightliner Inspiration =

Prototype semi-trailer truck

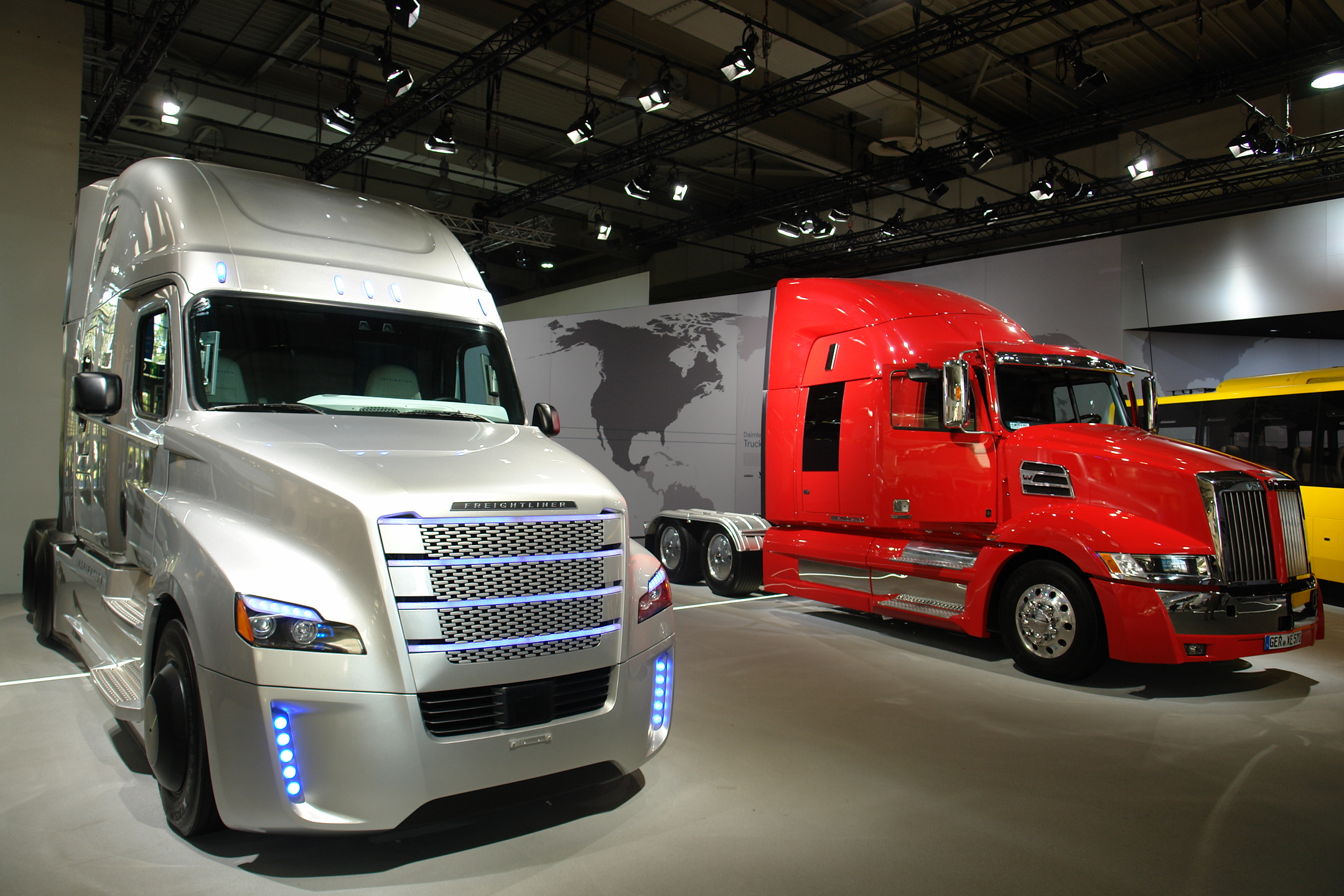
Freightliner Inspiration (foreground, on the left) on display. Red truck in the background is a Western Star 5700XE.

The Freightliner Inspiration is a prototype semi-trailer truck designed by Freightliner Trucks. The truck is the first autonomous commercial vehicle to be legally operated in the United States. There have been two units produced.

The truck was licensed to operate by the Nevada Department of Motor Vehicles in 2015.
