= Mount Holly Truck Manufacturing Plant =

- Built: 1978–1979
- Operated: 1979–present
- Location: 1800 North Main Street; Mount Holly, North Carolina, United States
- Coordinates: 35°19′23″N 81°0′8″W
- Industry: Automotive
- Products: trucks
- Volume: 630,000 square feet (59,000 m^{2})
- Owner: Freightliner Trucks (Daimler Truck North America)

Mount Holly Truck Manufacturing Plant is a Freightliner truck manufacturing plant in Mount Holly, North Carolina, owned by Daimler Truck North America.

== History ==
The plant was opened in May 1979 when Freightliner constructed a new plant in Mount Holly, North Carolina. Volumes continued to increase.

In August 2000, Freightliner announced it will discontinue its third shift at the Mount Holly, North Carolina, truck manufacturing plant, laying off 825 employees at the plant as heavy-duty truck sales slowed.

In 2001, the facility underwent a major renovation and expansion to prepare for producing the new medium-duty Business Class M2 line, which entered production in the following year. The renovation increased the facility's total footprint from 460,000 square feet to approximately 616,000 square feet.

In January 2003, Freightliner LLC idled the Mt. Holly truck plant along with the Cleveland truck plant from January 2nd through January 10th of the year.

In April 2007, due to changes in EPA emission standards allowed older truck models through early 2007, Freightliner laid off 478 workers at the truck factory.

In September 2012, the plant built its 500,000th vehicle. On March 27, 2023, the plant built its 750,000th vehicle. The 750,000th truck built was a brand-new Freightliner M2 106 Plus.

== Products made ==
- Freightliner Business Class M2 (2002–present)
