= Cleveland Truck Manufacturing Plant =

- Operated: 1989–present
- Location: 11550 Statesville Boulevard; Cleveland, North Carolina, United States
- Coordinates: 35°43′57″N 80°41′24″W
- Industry: Automotive
- Products: trucks
- Employees: 2,300
- Area: 178 acres (72 ha)
- Volume: 1,200,000 square feet (110,000 m^{2})
- Owner: Freightliner Trucks (Daimler Truck North America)

Cleveland Truck Manufacturing Plant is a Freightliner truck manufacturing plant in Cleveland, North Carolina, owned by Daimler Truck North America. The plant is the home of the Freightliner Cascadia truck.

== History ==
In 1989, Freightliner acquired a standing plant in Cleveland, North Carolina, near Statesville, that had been producing transit buses for German manufacturer MAN.

In August 2000, Freightliner announced it will discontinue its third shift at the Cleveland truck plant, terminating 1,304 workers at the plant as heavy-duty truck sales slowed.

In October 2002, Freightliner LLC announced workforce reductions and temporary plant shutdowns, including laying off 138 regular employees and 362 temporary workers at the Cleveland truck plant. In January 2003, Freightliner LLC idled the Cleveland truck plant along with the Mt. Holly truck plant from January 2nd through January 10th of the year.

The UAW eventually organized the Cleveland truck plant (along with the Gastonia parts plant in Gastonia, North Carolina) in January 2003 using a card-check agreement after workers signed authorization cards in favor of representation.

The plant experienced massive growth and became Rowan County's largest employer. By 2004, the facility provided approximately 3,700 jobs during periods of peak production and third-shift expansions.

In April 2007, amid contract negotiations and a push by the Workers World for structural wage changes, Freightliner laid off 1,180 workers and eliminated the third shift at the truck factory.

In January 2009, Daimler slashed nearly 1,300 jobs (about three-quarters of the workforce) at the Cleveland truck plant effective March 13, 2009, due to collapsing demand for Class 8 trucks, leaving only 700 workers at the plant. Additional rolling cuts followed later that year in December 2009, as Freightliner laid off its second shift.

On August 22, 2014, the Cleveland plant built its 3 millionth vehicle, a 2015 Cascadia Evolution. At the time, Freightliner employed 2,600 workers at the facility.

On September 8, 2022, the plant built its 800,000th vehicle, a Freightliner Cascadia, which was handed over to the motor carrier Old Dominion Freight Line in September 2022.

== Products made ==
- Freightliner Cascadia (2008–present)
