= ERF (truck manufacturer) =

British truck manufacturer

- Industry: Automotive
- Founded: 1933
- Founder: Edwin Richard Foden
- Defunct: 2007
- Successor: MAN
- Headquarters: Sandbach, England
- Products: Trucks; Buses
- Parent: MAN
- Website: www.erf.com

ERF was a British truck manufacturer established in 1933 by Edwin Richard Foden, from whose initials the company was named. Its factory in Middlewich closed in 2002, and it was discontinued as a marque by owner MAN in 2007.

== History ==
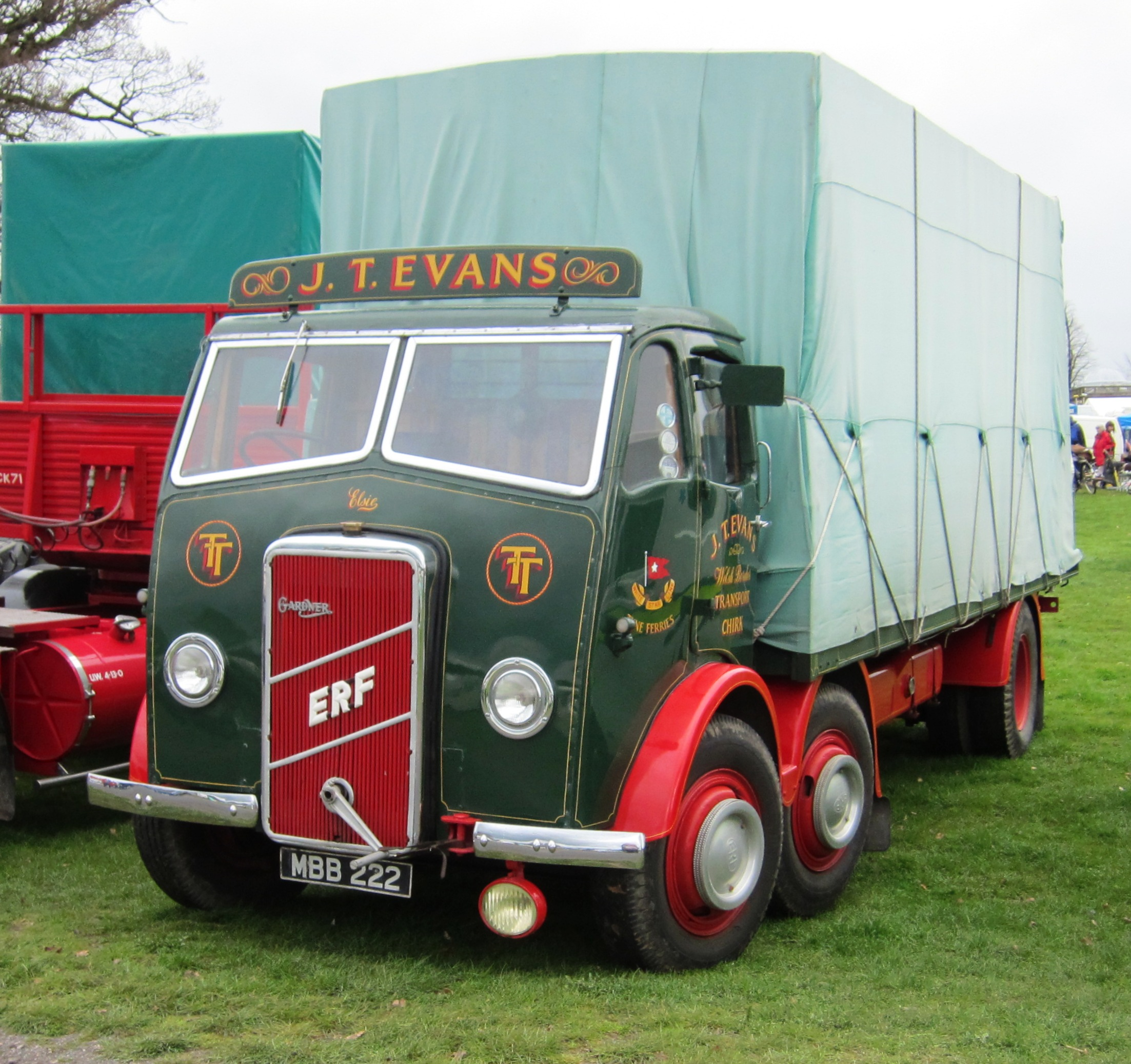
Preserved 1947 ERF

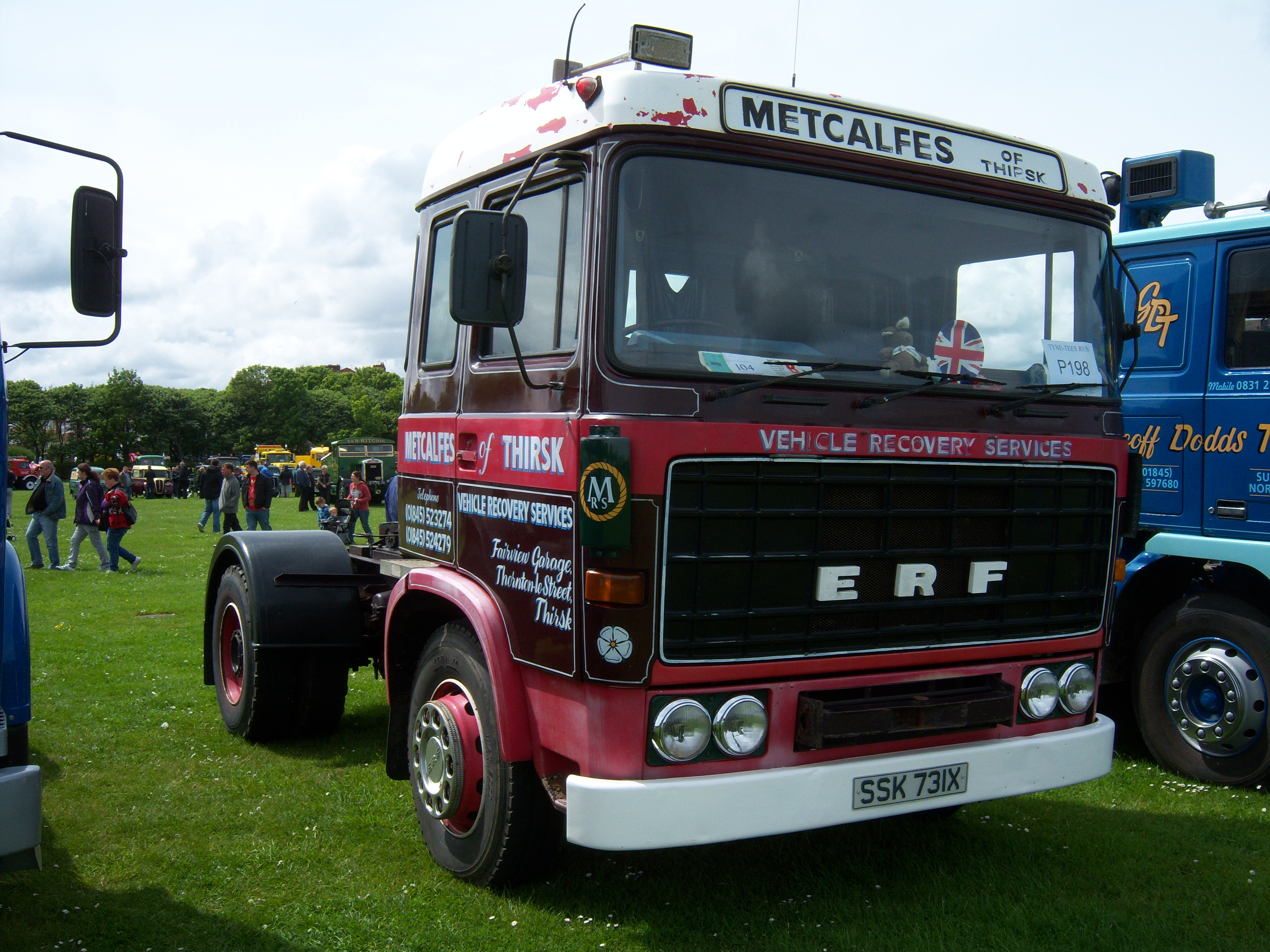
Preserved B Series

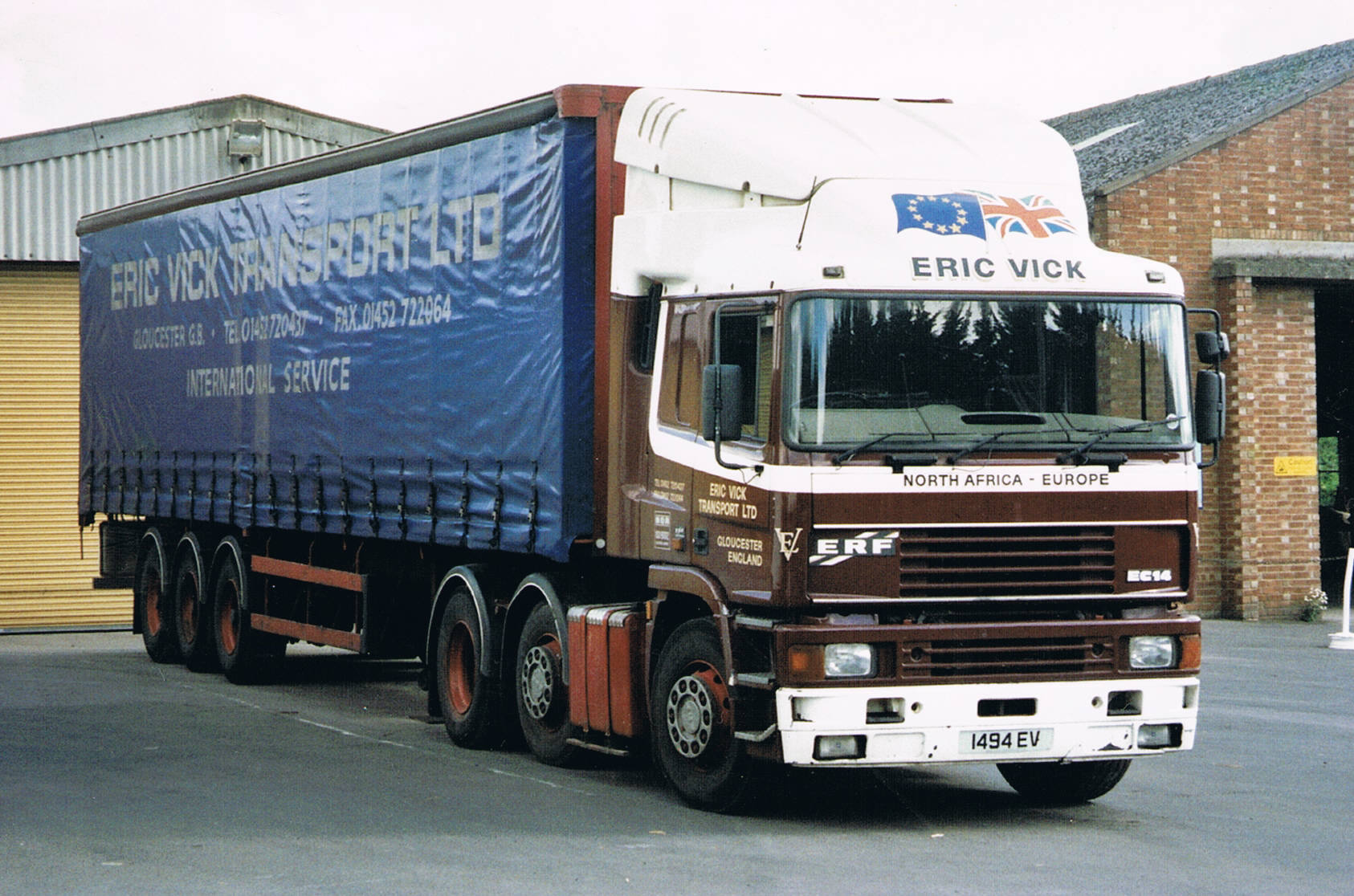
ERF EC

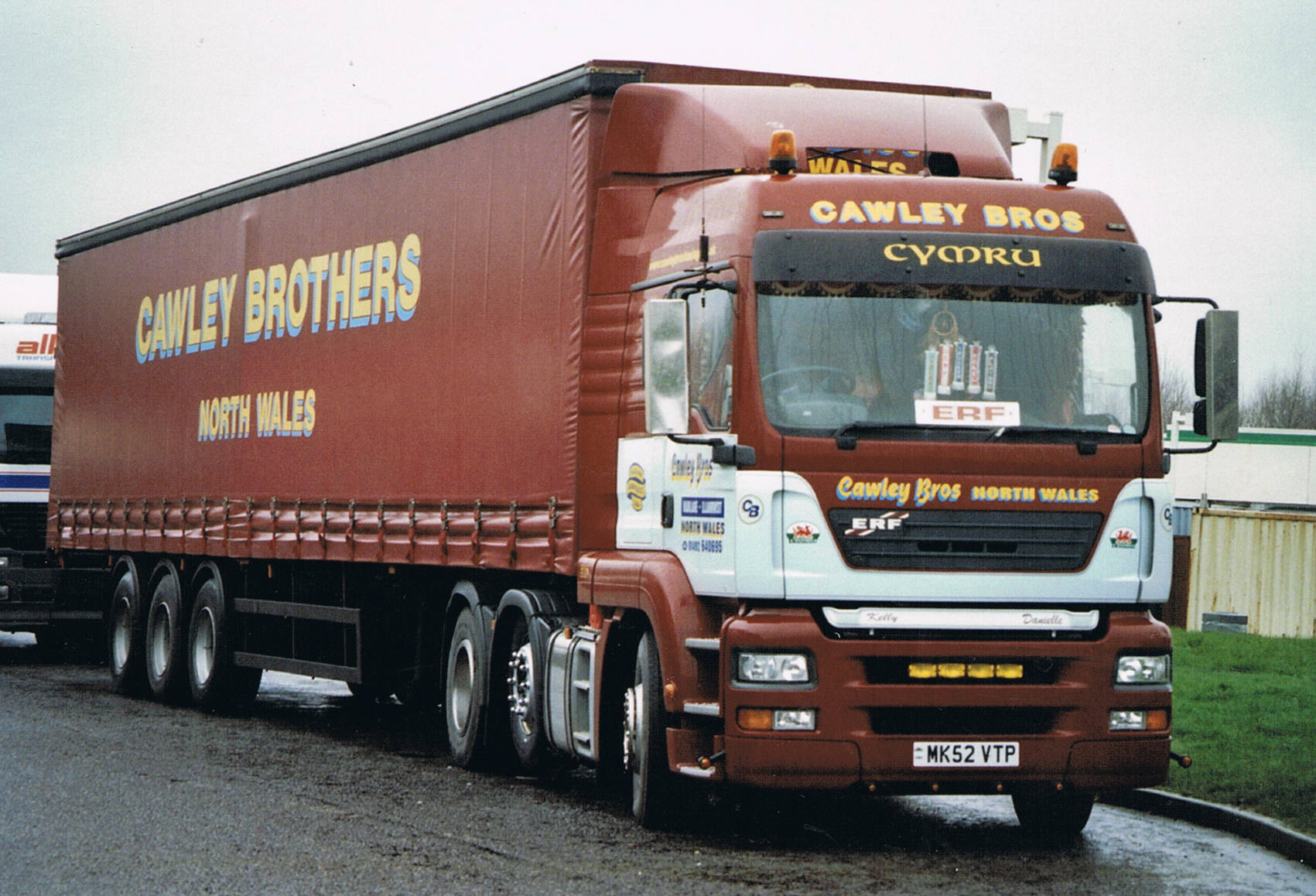
A 2001 ERF ECT 6x2 tractor truck (the cab was borrowed from the 2000 truck MAN TGA). It was followed by the ECM, and lastly the ECL before the shutting down of the ERF industry.

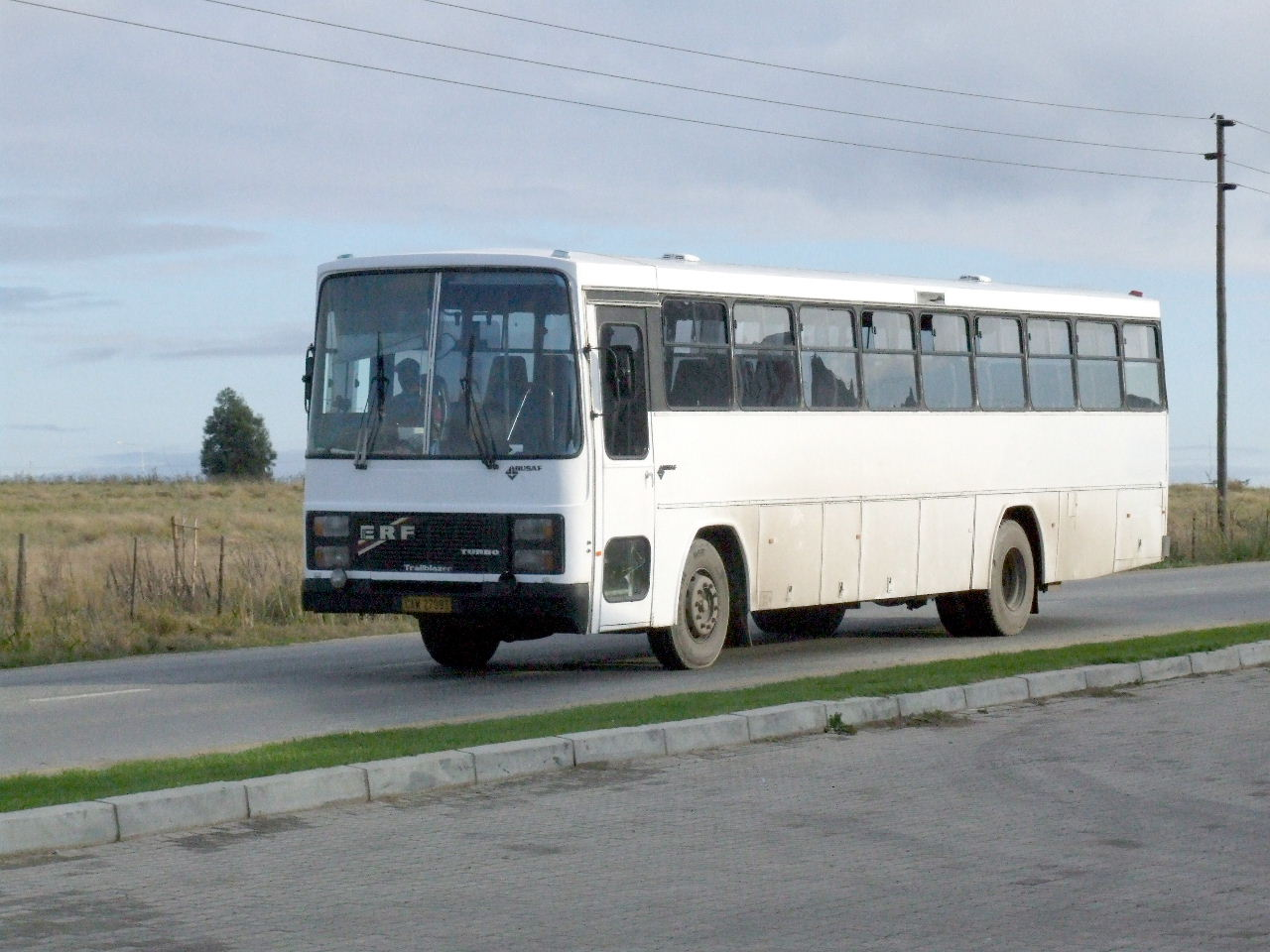
ERF Trailblazer bus in South Africa

In 1881, the first Foden traction engine was built in Sandbach. In 1898, Edwin Richard Foden designed the first steam wagon to run on steel tyre wheels. This system was used successfully until 1913, by which time the development of vulcanised solid-rubber tyres enabled them to be fitted on heavy vehicles. Edwin introduced the first pneumatic-tyred Foden steam wagon, but as steam transport appeared to be going out of favour, he turned his attention to the development of a 6- to 8-ton chassis fitted with new Gardner LW (Light Weight) high-speed oil engine.

In the early 1930s, with the economy in a major recession, insurers were increasingly reluctant to underwrite steam boilers. As a result, Edwin believed the future of the lorry-building industry lay in diesel engine power; the Foden boardroom did not agree, and consequently he resigned, along with his son Dennis.

With the help of Dennis and two former colleagues, including Ernest Sherratt, who became chief engineer, Edwin built the first ERF diesel lorry in 1933, and gave the first chassis the number 63, which was his age. From the beginning, the company bought components only from other suppliers rather than manufacture them itself, including engines from Gardner, gearboxes from David Brown, and axles from Kirkstall Forge Engineering. This concept served ERF well throughout its existence.

A new cab was styled by Sandbach coachbuilder John Henry Jennings, who also provided factory space to assemble the new lorry. Based in Sandbach, the company made its own chassis and cab. The cab structure was made in Northampton at Air Flow Streamlines and fitted out by ERF in Sandbach. The engines came from Gardner, but later also Cummins, Rolls-Royce, Perkins, Detroit Diesel and Caterpillar supplied them.

ERFs were marketed under the Western Star badge in some countries, such as Australia. It also built a specialist fire-engine chassis, with a body built on by in-house company JH Jennings, later Cheshire Fire Engineering. However, when recession came in the beginning of the 1980s, and production fell from a total output of 4,000 chassis per annum, CFE was sold to management to eventually become Saxon Sanbec.

ERF was never a major manufacturer; as an example, its domestic sales total reached only 1,083 trucks in 1981. The company was bought by Canadian truck maker Western Star in June 1996. In 1999, Marshall SPV sold the Bedford parts operation to ERF, since Western Star, their parent company would be able to produce and distribute parts better due to their worldwide network, although the Bedford name was kept by Marshall. However, after Paccar's purchase of Foden, DAF Trucks and Leyland Trucks competitive pressure increased, and after Western Star was approached by Freightliner Trucks, the decision was made to sell ERF.

=== Purchase by MAN ===
In 2000, ERF became part of MAN, with production moving to a new factory in Middlewich. Fraud was later discovered to have occurred at ERF, and its financial position had been incorrectly stated, with MAN winning a legal case against Freightliner. Freightliner, in turn, tried to sue Western Star and ERF's former auditors Ernst & Young, but failed on the grounds of corporate negligence.

MAN withdrew ERF from the bus market.

=== Final model range ===
ERF's final model range consisted of the ECT, ECM, and ECL built on MAN's production line in Munich (for heavy trucks), and a plant in Middlewich for light trucks, positioned to win a contract from the Ministry of Defence for 8,000 new British Armed Forces trucks. All the ERF trucks were based on MAN's existing products, the only difference being that the ERF model came with the option of specifying use of the Cummins ISMe power plant. This was as an alternate to MAN's own D20 common rail power plant. The factory in Middlewich closed in March 2002, with production of the ECT moved to Munich, Germany, and ECM and ECL units moved to Steyr, Austria, where they were built on the same facilities as their identical MAN counterparts.

In the light of Cummins' intransigence on upgrading the ISMe engine to comply with the Euro 4 emission regulations, MAN initially decided to replace it completely with the new series of MAN D20 engines. With ERF badging used for only the market in the United Kingdom, MAN decided to cease supplying ERF-badged trucks from July 2007 onwards.
