= Freightliner Gaffney Plant =

- Built: 1989
- Operated: 1989–present
- Location: 552 Hyatt Street; Gaffney, South Carolina, United States
- Coordinates: 35°4′27″N 81°40′57″W
- Industry: Automotive
- Products: chassis
- Employees: 650
- Area: 75 acres (30 ha)
- Volume: 200,000 square feet (19,000 m^{2})
- Owner: Freightliner Trucks (Daimler Truck North America)

Freightliner Gaffney Plant, operating as Freightliner Custom Chassis Corporation, is a Freightliner chassis manufacturing plant in Gaffney, South Carolina, owned by Daimler Truck North America.

== History ==
The plant was built in 1989 by Oshkosh on a 75-acre site with a 163,000-square-foot manufacturing plant.

On February 28, 1995, Freightliner announced it will acquire the chassis manufacturing plant from Oshkosh along with the entire Oshkosh Chassis Division. The plant was reopened as a Freightliner Custom Chassis Corporation (FCCC) manufacturing plant in the same year.

In May 2000, Freightliner announced an $11.4 million, 58,000-square-foot expansion at the plant to build light commercial vehicles for package delivery markets.

On October 23, 2003, FCCC rolled out its 100,000th chassis at its plant.

In August 2008, Freightliner announced it would cut 100 jobs and reduce operations at the Gaffney plant to a single shift, leaving 790 full-time workers amid dropping customer demand and a weakening recreational vehicle and truck market. Just weeks later, the company announced an additional 225 layoffs, cutting the plant's workforce nearly in half from its earlier numbers.

== Products made ==
- Freightliner FS-65 (1997–2006)
- Freightliner C2 (2004–present)
