= Detroit Diesel plant =

Engine manufacturing plant in Redford Township, Michigan

- Operated: 1938–present
- Location: 13400 West Outer Drive; Redford, Michigan, United States
- Coordinates: 42°22′36″N 83°16′12″W
- Industry: Automotive
- Products: engines
- Employees: 1,900 (2010)
- Volume: 3,000,000 square feet (280,000 m^{2})
- Owner: Detroit Diesel (Daimler Truck North America)

Detroit Diesel plant is an engine manufacturing plant in Redford Township, Michigan owned by Detroit Diesel.

== History ==
The plant was established in January 1938 (along with the Detroit Diesel Engine Division) by General Motors to produce the Series 71 engine.

In September 1998, the company eliminated bottlenecks and added a second shift on its new Series 60 north assembly line, lifting daily output capacity to 300 engines per day to meet record sales orders. In October 2000, DaimlerChrysler acquired Detroit Diesel Corporation, integrating the Redford on-highway engine plant into its commercial vehicle operations.

In August 2002, Detroit Diesel announced it will indefinitely idle 500 to 700 workers at its plant starting the second week of October. The layoffs were directly tied to federal Environmental Protection Agency (EPA) emissions standards taking effect on October 1, 2002. The plant was also scheduled for retooling during this transition.

In June 2010, Detroit Diesel announced a $194 million investment plan to install new manufacturing processes, expand operations, and bringing up to 2,000 jobs at the Detroit plant.

== Products ==
=== Current ===
- Detroit Diesel DD5
- Detroit Diesel DD8
- Detroit Diesel DD13
- Detroit Diesel DD15
- Detroit Diesel DD16

=== Former ===
- Detroit Diesel Series 71 (1938–1995)
- Detroit Diesel Series 92 (1974–1995)
- Detroit Diesel Series 149 (1967–1999)
- Detroit Diesel Series 60 (1987–2011)
- Detroit Diesel Series 50 (1994–2005)
