= Daimler Truck North America =

Automotive industry manufacturer

Daimler Truck North America LLC
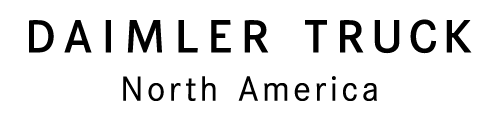
- Formerly: Daimler Trucks North America LLC
- Type: Subsidiary
- Industry: Automotive
- Predecessor: Freightliner LLC
- Founded: 2008
- Headquarters: Portland, Oregon, U.S.
- Key people: John O’Leary (President, CEO)
- Products: Commercial vehicles; Diesel engines
- Parent: Daimler Truck AG
- Divisions: Freightliner
- Subsidiaries: Detroit Diesel; Thomas Built Buses; Western Star Trucks
- Website: northamerica.daimlertruck.com

Daimler Truck North America LLC (formerly Freightliner Corporation) is an automotive industry manufacturer of commercial vehicles headquartered in Portland, Oregon, United States. It is a subsidiary of the German multinational Daimler Truck AG.

On October 1, 2021, Daimler AG stockholders approved a spinoff of the truck division.

== Brands ==
- Alliance Parts
- Detroit Diesel
- Freightliner Trucks
- Freightliner Custom Chassis Corporation
- Freightliner SelecTrucks
- Thomas Built Buses
- Western Star Trucks
- Demand Detroit
- Sterling Trucks

Fuso Trucks America, formerly mostly owned by Daimler Truck, operates separately from Daimler Trucks North America.

== History ==
=== Early years ===
- 1896- Gottlieb Daimler creates the first truck.
- 1923- First diesel truck: Benz
- 1926- Daimler and Benz merge.
- 1942- Leland James founds the Freightliner Corporation.
- 1947- Freightliner opens its first truck plant in Portland, Oregon.
- 1950- Hyster Company is the first private carrier to order a Freightliner truck.
- 1951- Freightliner signs agreement to retail trucks through White Motor Corporation dealerships.

=== 1960s and 1970s ===
- 1967- Western Star founded by White Motor Corporation.
- 1976- Freightliner opens new corporate headquarters in Portland, Oregon, and sets up regional sales offices.
- 1977- Freightliner launches an independent network of dealerships and ends its agreement with White Motor Corporation.

=== 1980s and 1990s ===
- 1981- Daimler-Benz AG purchases Freightliner Corporation from Consolidated Freightways.
- 1992- Production starts at Freightliner's new truck plant in St. Thomas, Ontario, Canada
- 1995- Freightliner launches Freightliner Custom Chassis Corporation and acquires American LaFrance.
- 1997- Freightliner acquires Ford Motor Company's heavy-truck business and names it "Sterling." Freightliner launches SelecTrucks.
- 1998- Freightliner acquires Thomas Built Buses. Daimler-Benz and Chrysler merge.
- 1999- The one-millionth Freightliner truck is built.

=== 2000s ===
- 2000- Freightliner acquires Western Star Trucks. DaimlerChrysler buys Detroit Diesel Corporation.
- 2002- Western Star production moves to Portland.
- 2003- Thomas Built Buses debuts the Saf-T-Liner C2, a revolutionary school bus design.
- 2004- Freightliner opens its high-tech wind tunnel center in Portland, Oregon. FCCC introduces the hybrid electric walk-in van chassis.
- 2005- Opening of a high-tech cold chamber in Portland, Oregon.
- 2007- Daimler and Chrysler split. The new Daimler AG is founded. Freightliner LLC is renamed Daimler Trucks North America. Detroit Diesel starts production of the new heavy-duty engine – the DD15. Saltillo, Mexico plant opens.
- 2008- Parts of the company's operations are moved to Fort Mill, SC. Freightliner LLC becomes Daimler Trucks North America, LLC.

=== 2010s ===
- 2014- Western Star introduces "The 5700" on-highway tractor with product placement in the latest Transformers movie "Age of Extinction" as the heroic lead character, Optimus Prime. Freightliner Custom Chassis Corporation launches UltraSteer passive rear steer axles for recreational vehicles to improve maneuverability and extend tire life.
- 2015- DTNA completes its SuperTruck program after achieving 115% freight efficiency improvement and 12.2 MPG during final testing as part of a U.S. Dept. of Energy research program. Detroit Assurance is introduced in Freightliner Cascadia. Daimler Trucks North America introduces the world's first autonomous commercial vehicle licensed for use on U.S. public roads. The Freightliner Inspiration Truck was unveiled before a global audience at Nevada's Hoover Dam.
- 2016- Daimler Trucks North America opens its new LEED Platinum headquarters on its campus in Portland, Oregon. Thomas Built Buses celebrates its 100th anniversary. Thomas Built Buses launches the industry's first compressed natural gas Type C school bus. Detroit launches the DD5™ medium-duty engine.
- 2017- Western Star celebrates its 50th anniversary. Freightliner celebrates its 75th anniversary. Freightliner Trucks introduces the new Cascadia with Detroit IDP (integrated powertrain management), which helps achieve up to an 8% fuel efficiency improvement over the Cascadia® Evolution.
- 2018- Thomas Built Buses launches the all-electric "Jouley" Saf-T-Liner C2. Detroit launches the DD8™ medium-duty engine.

=== 2020s ===
- 2020- Starting in January, Daimler Trucks North America took over official support of Setra coaches in North America, along with distribution being taken over by Daimler's new subsidiary, Daimler Coaches North America.
- 2021- Daimler AG Stockholders approve spinoff of truck division.
- 2023- Daimler Trucks North America launched the Rizon brand in the United States in 2023 and in Canada in 2024.
- 2026- Detroit, Daimler's powertrain manufacturer introduces its 2027 heavy-duty Gen 6 engines for EPA 2027 compliance

== Leadership ==
- Martin Daum (2009–2017)
- Roger Nielsen (2017–2021)
- John O'Leary (2021–present)

== Manufacturing plants ==
=== Current ===
Name	City/state	Year Opened	Products
Cleveland Truck Manufacturing Plant	Cleveland, North Carolina	1989, acquired from MAN	Freightliner Cascadia
Mount Holly Truck Manufacturing Plant	Mount Holly, North Carolina	1979	Freightliner Business Class M2

- Gaffney, South Carolina (Freightliner Custom Chassis Corporation)
- Gastonia, North Carolina (Alliance Truck Parts)
- High Point, North Carolina (Thomas Built Buses)
- Redford, Michigan (Detroit Diesel)
- Santiago Tianguistenco, Estado de Mexico, Mexico (Freightliner / Western Star)
- Saltillo, Coahuila, Mexico (Freightliner)

=== Former ===
Name	City/state	Year Opened	Year Closed	Products
Portland Truck Manufacturing Plant	Portland, Oregon	1942	2026	Freightliner eCascadia; Freightliner eM2; Western Star X-Series
