= Western Star Trucks =

American truck manufacturer

Western Star
- Type: Subsidiary
- Industry: Automotive
- Predecessor: White Motor Corporation
- Founded: 1967; 59 years ago in Cleveland, Ohio, United States and Kelowna, British Columbia, Canada
- Founder: White Motor Corporation
- Headquarters: Portland, Oregon, U.S.
- Key people: Roger Nielson (President, CEO); Dave Carson (President)
- Products: Trucks
- Parent: Daimler Truck North America
- Subsidiaries: ERF (1996–2000)
- Website: westernstarstrucks.com

Western Star is an American truck manufacturer headquartered in Portland, Oregon. It is owned by Daimler Truck North America, which is a subsidiary of German automotive manufacturer Daimler Truck AG. Western Star trucks are commonly sold at Freightliner dealerships and is generally marketed as a more premium compared to Freightliner.

== History ==
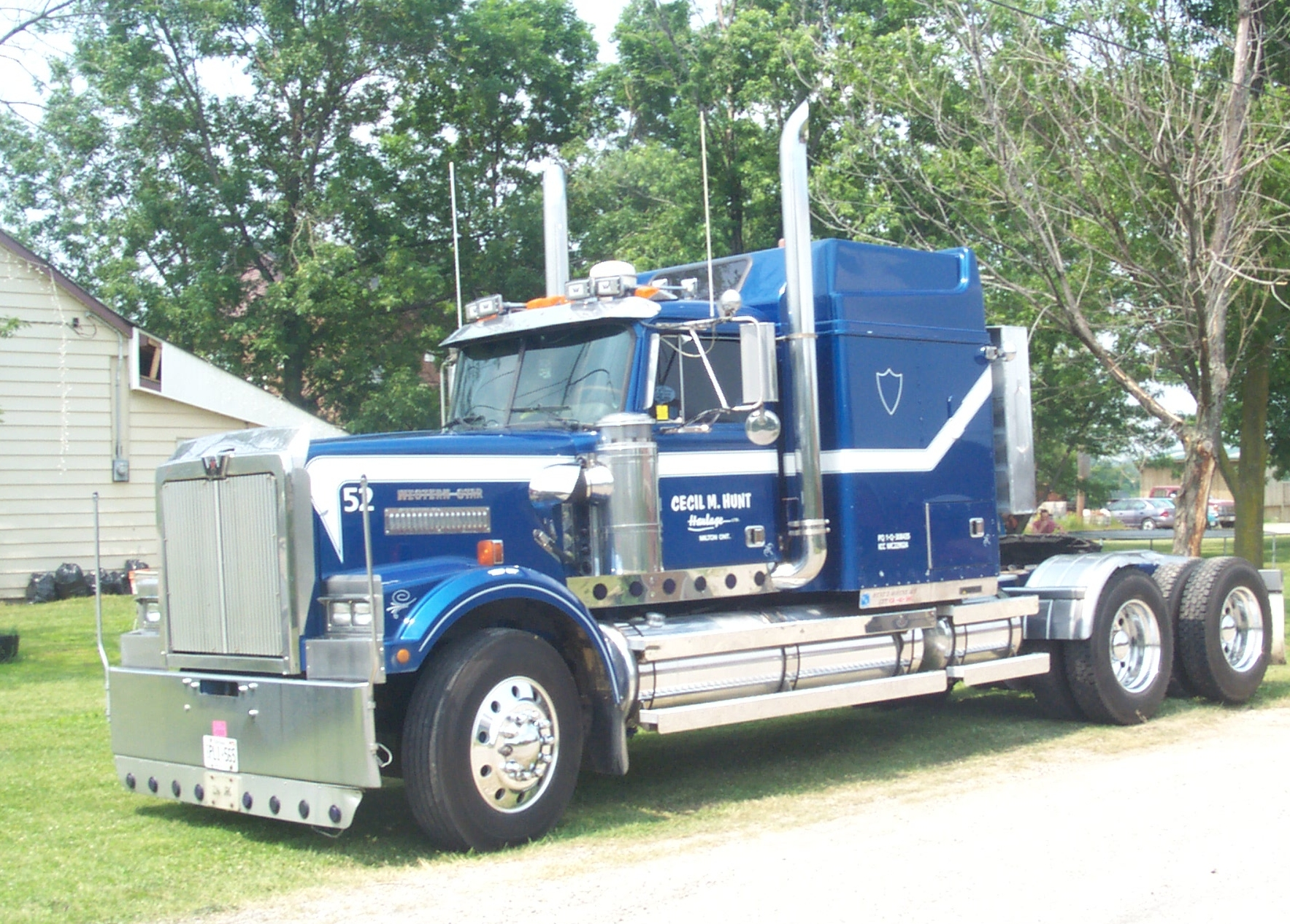
A 1997 "heritage"-style Western Star 4900

In 1967, White Motor Corporation started the Western Star division as White Western Star with a new plant at Kelowna, British Columbia, sharing headquarters with White in Cleveland, Ohio. White Western Star trucks in that era typically used cabs from its sister company, Autocar. Western Star production was moved to Ogden, Utah, but the brand was not included in the 1981 sale of White's truck business to Volvo, instead being sold to Bow Valley Resources and Nova Corporation, each owning 50%.

In 1991, Western Star Trucks was purchased by the owners of the Western Star Australian subsidiary, Terry Peabody and Bob Shand. Western Star Trucks acquired the bus manufacturer Ontario Bus Industries (renamed Orion Bus Industries) in 1995. ERF trucks was purchased by Western Star in 1996. It was sold in 2000 to MAN.

In 2000, Western Star was purchased by DaimlerChrysler, becoming part of the Freightliner Trucks division.

In 2002, Western Star production was moved to a plant in Portland, Oregon. In May 2015, the Daimler Truck North America plant in Cleveland, North Carolina, began to build 4700 and 4900 models, as well as assemble all new semi tractor 5700XE models.

== Current models ==
In 2022, Western Star announced and released the X Series of trucks to market, replacing the then current "Constellation" Series which had been in production since 1998/99. The new X series of Western Star trucks includes; 47X, 48X (Australia only), 49X and 57X.

The 47X is the entry-level model, used mostly for vocational purposes, such as adding a dump bed or cement mixer. The 47X can also be used with a standard fifth wheel connector to tow standard trailers. The 47X is available in a day cab configuration, along with 36″ and 48″ sleeper options.

The 49X is also a vocational truck, that is a bit more heavy duty and has more customizability. The 49X is available as a standard semi and extra attachments can be added. The 49X is available in multiple cab configurations, including day cab, 36″ sleeper, 48″ sleeper, 60″ sleeper and 72″ sleeper. The 36″ is a trench style low roof, while the 48″ and 60″ are available in mid roof. The 72″ is available in high roof and mid roof.

The 57X is the on-highway variant which uses a Freightliner Cascadia chassis and cab but has many improvements such as reinforced cabin bones, different doors, and an aerodynamic front end with two stage heated headlights and stainless steel chrome grille. It also implements a digital cockpit as standard equipment. Customers still can opt for a standard analog dashboard. It is designed as on-highway semi truck capable of towing semi trailers, with few to no vocational applications. The 57X is a more premium model than its vocational counterparts. Every 57X is hand-built in Cleveland, North Carolina. The 57X comes in multiple configurations, including day cab, and 60″ mid roof and 72″ high roof sleeper options.

Available transmissions are Automated Manual DT12 in different specifications and Eaton Automated Manual/Manual gearboxes.

== Previous models ==
Western Star previously offered the following models:

- The 4700 Series was Western Star's entry-level model and was available in truck and tractor applications, both with a 110-inch (2,790 mm) bumper-to-back-of-cab (BBC) length. In vocational applications, its engineering helped reduce unfitting time and costs for body builders, and could be outfitted for virtually any vocational application. For on-highway use, the 4700 was available in a daycab and with 40" sleeper configuration and was primarily used in short haul applications.
- The 4800 Series offered more powerful engine options than the 4700 and featured a 109-inch (2,770 mm) BBC. Western Star provided the truck as a bare chassis and cab, which could be fitted with a dump body, mixer, tank, crane, or other structure by a bodybuilding company as desired by the customer. The factory-installed twin steer option was also popular on this model for dump and mixer applications. Tractor versions were also available.
- The 4900 Series featured a 123-inch (3,120 mm) BBC. This was a multi-use truck/tractor which was targeted at a variety of industries. The truck could be built as a tractor with fifth wheel, bare chassis for a bodybuilder to outfit, or a lowered-cab model (Low Max) for auto hauling. The 4900 was available in five configurations including Extreme Duty and Twin Steer.
- The 5700XE launched in 2015 and was designed only for on-highway applications. The truck featured a 126-inch (3,200 mm) BBC, and a set back front axle position. It could be specified as a daycab or as a sleeper. Optimus Prime transforms into this vehicle in the Transformers films Age of Extinction and The Last Knight. The truck used for filming, however, was cosmetically modified.
- The 6900 Series was the highest capacity model built by Western Star and was designed for off-highway vocations including logging, mining, and other similar applications. It was available in Extreme Duty and Twin Steer configurations (XD and TS), each featured a 141-inch (3,580 mm) BBC and could be recognized both by its size as well as by its flat, squared front fenders.
- The Light Support Vehicle, Wheeled, or LSVW, was built for the Canadian Armed Forces under license in the 1990s based on the Iveco VM 90. Changes to the design included a four speed automatic transmission and a turbocharger, increasing engine power to 115HP. It was configured as a cargo truck, command post, ambulance and communication cable laying vehicle. 2,879 were built.
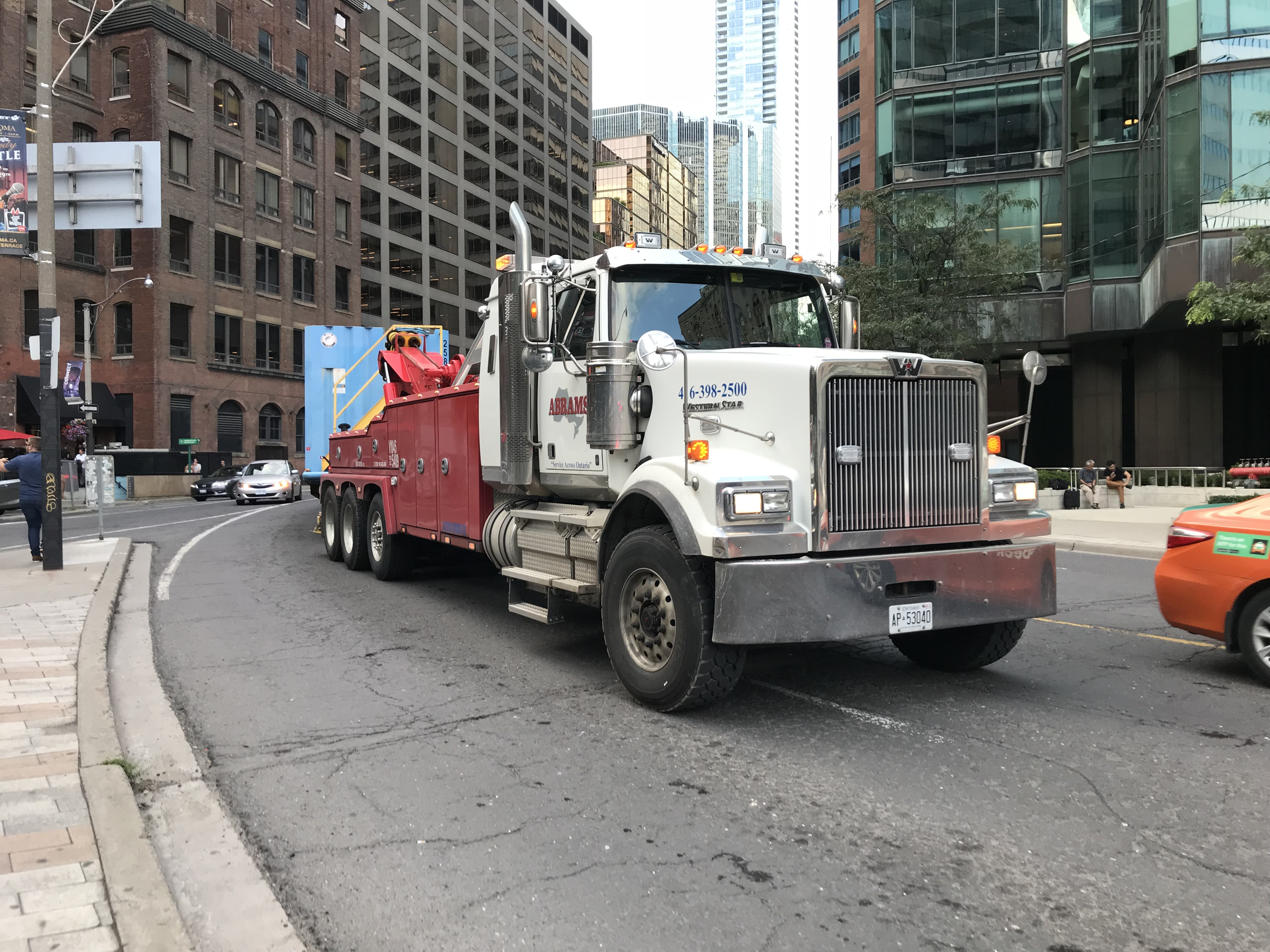
Western Star Vulcan, Toronto City

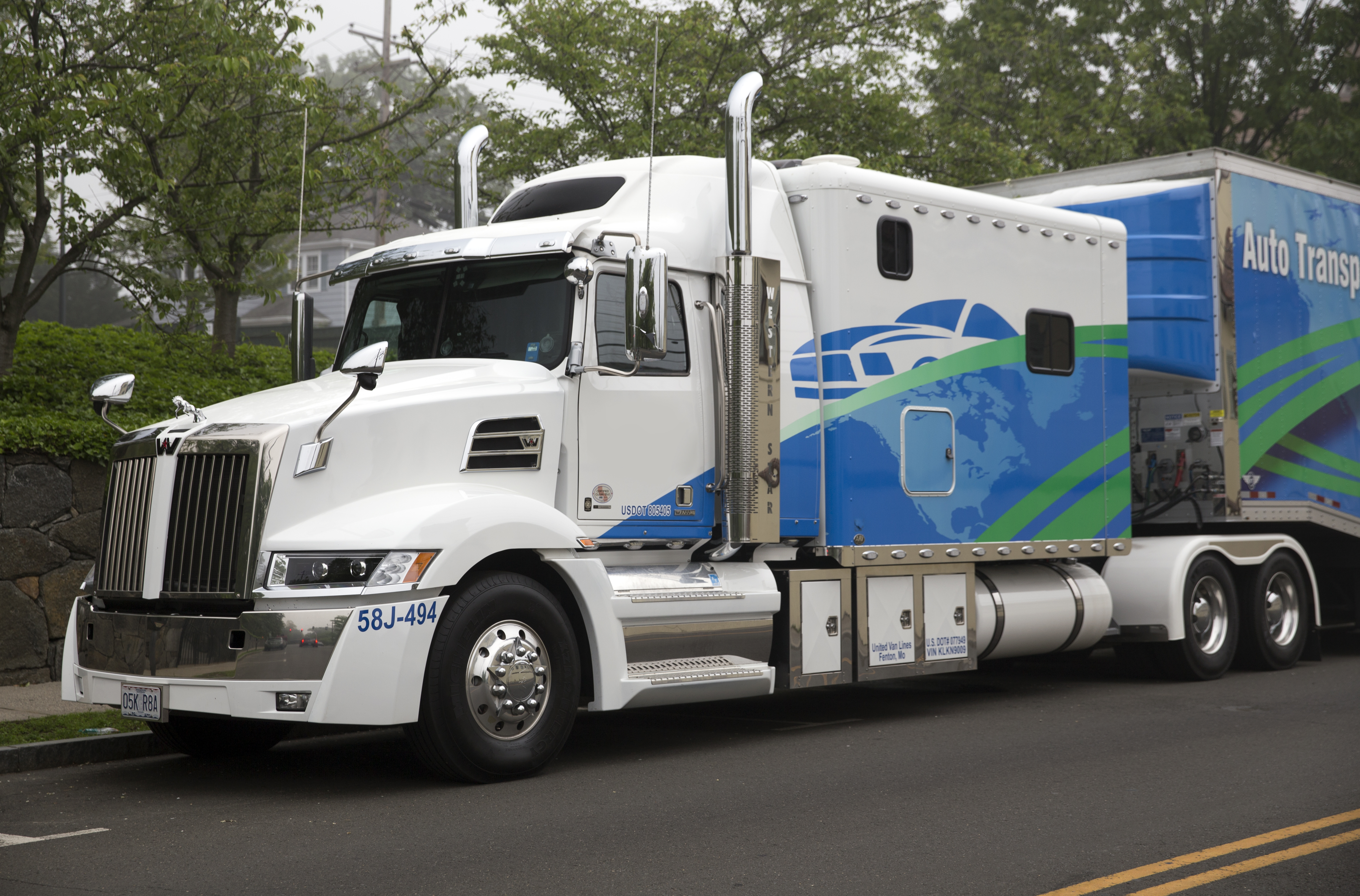
Western Star 5700XE

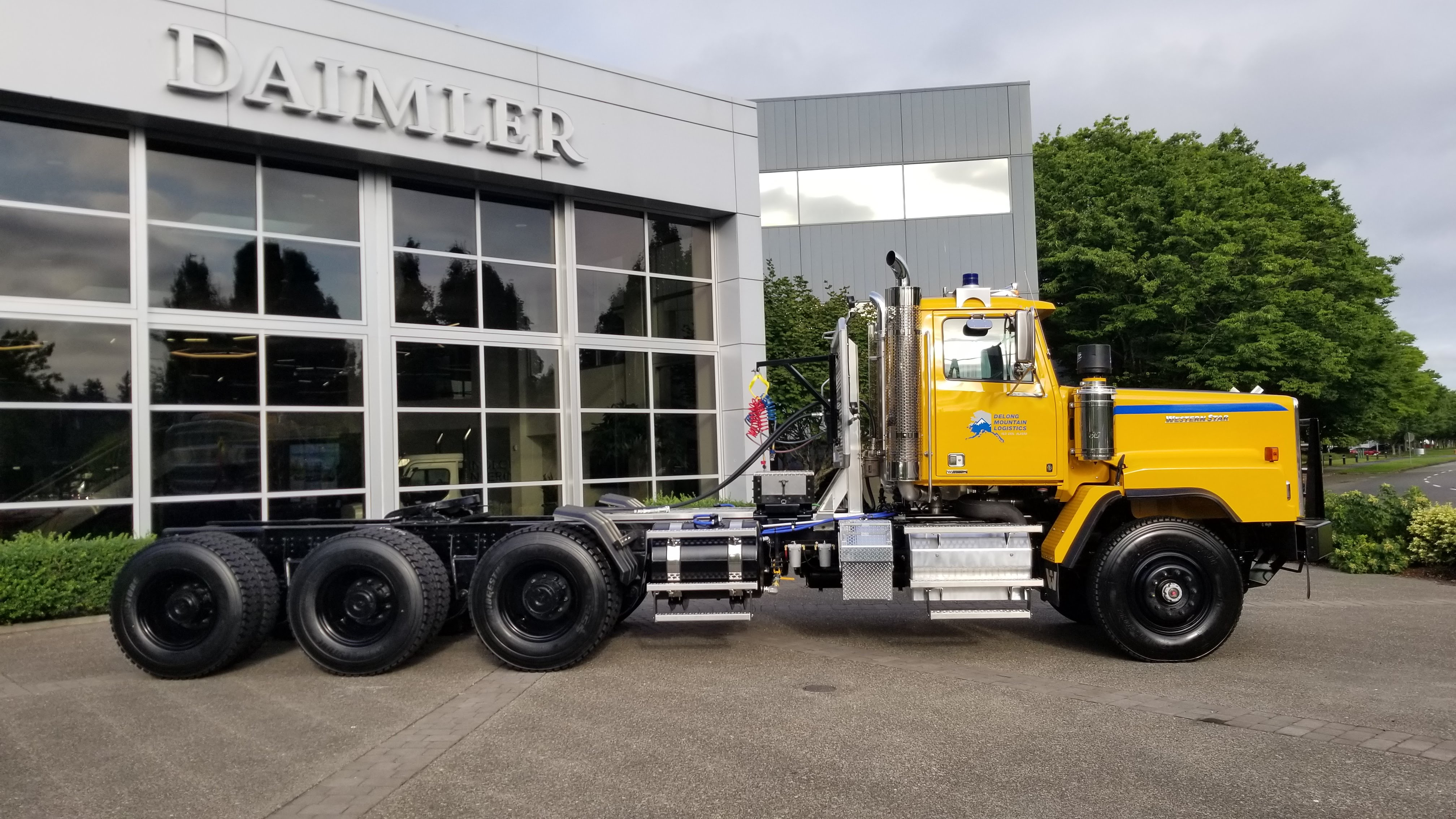
Western Star 6900 8x6 parked in front of Daimler Truck building in Portland, Oregon.

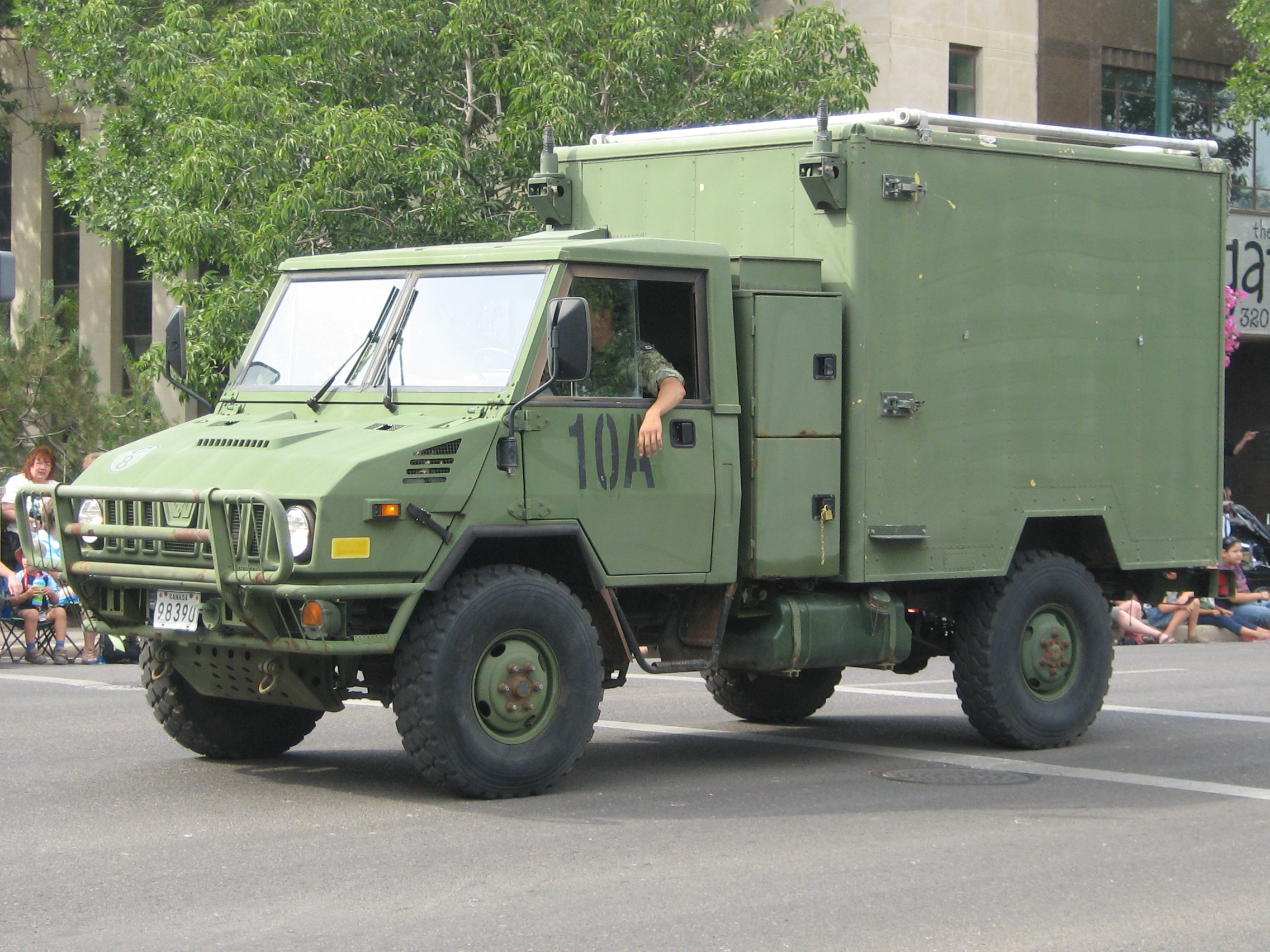
Western Star LSVW used by the Canadian Army.

== See also ==
- Freightliner Cascadia
