= Freightliner Cascadia =

Heavy-duty truck

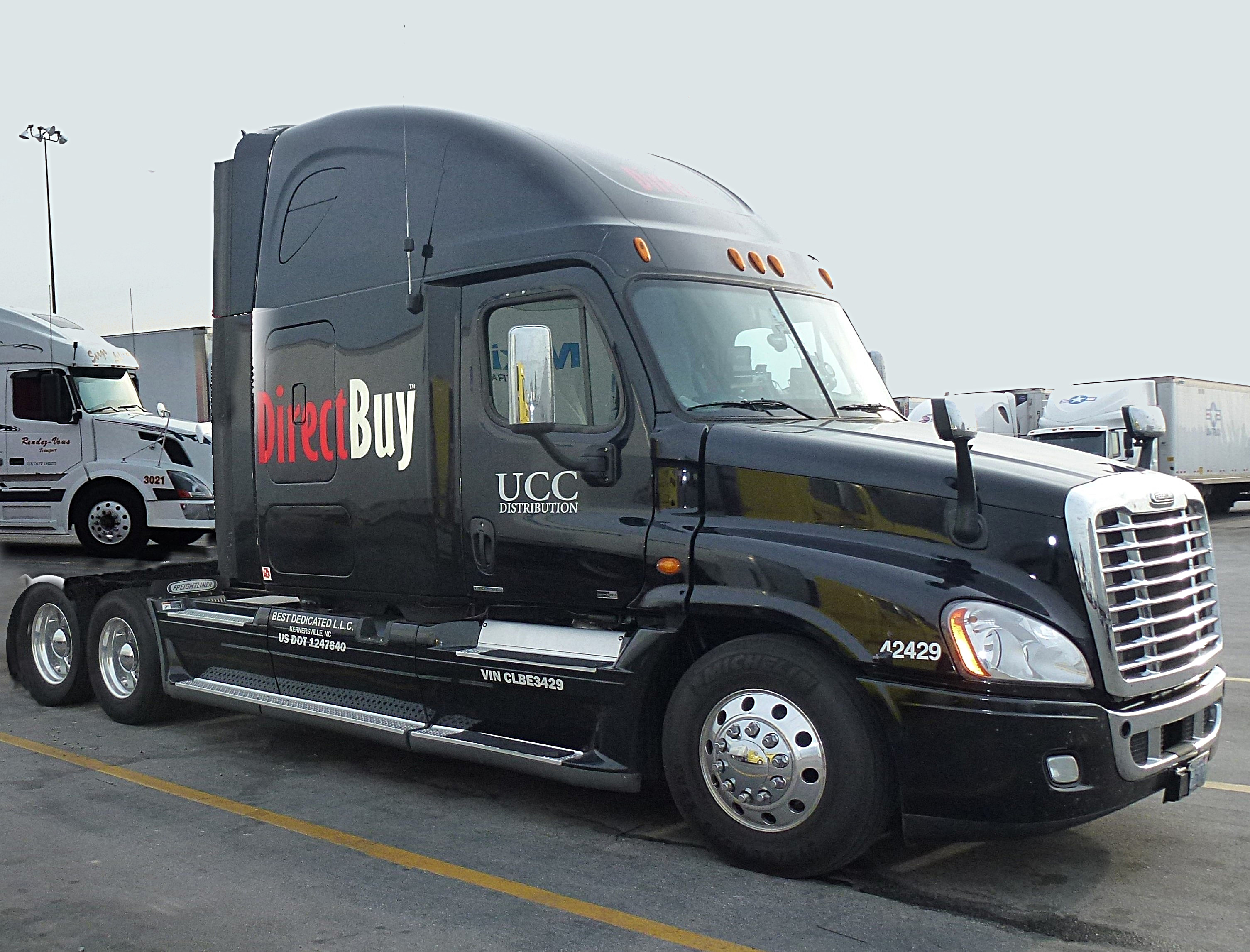
- First-generation Freightliner Cascadia

Overview
- Manufacturer: Daimler Trucks North America
- Production: 2007–present
- Model years: 2008–present
- Assembly: United States: Cleveland, North Carolina; Mexico: Santiago Tianguistenco

Body and chassis
- Class: Class 8 truck
- Body style: Conventional
- Layout: 6x4 6x2 4x2
- Platform: CA125
- Related: Mercedes-Benz Actros (interior only); Western Star 57X

Powertrain
- Engine: Detroit DD13/15/16, Cummins ISX15 EPA
- Transmission: Detroit DT12 (automated manual); Eaton Fuller 8, 9, 10, 13, 15 and 18 speed (manual); Eaton AutoShift 10, 13 or 18 speed (automated manual); Eaton UltraShift Plus 10, 13, 18 speed (automated manual); Allison 3000, 4000 and 4500 series (automatic)

Chronology
- Predecessor: Freightliner Century (Columbia)

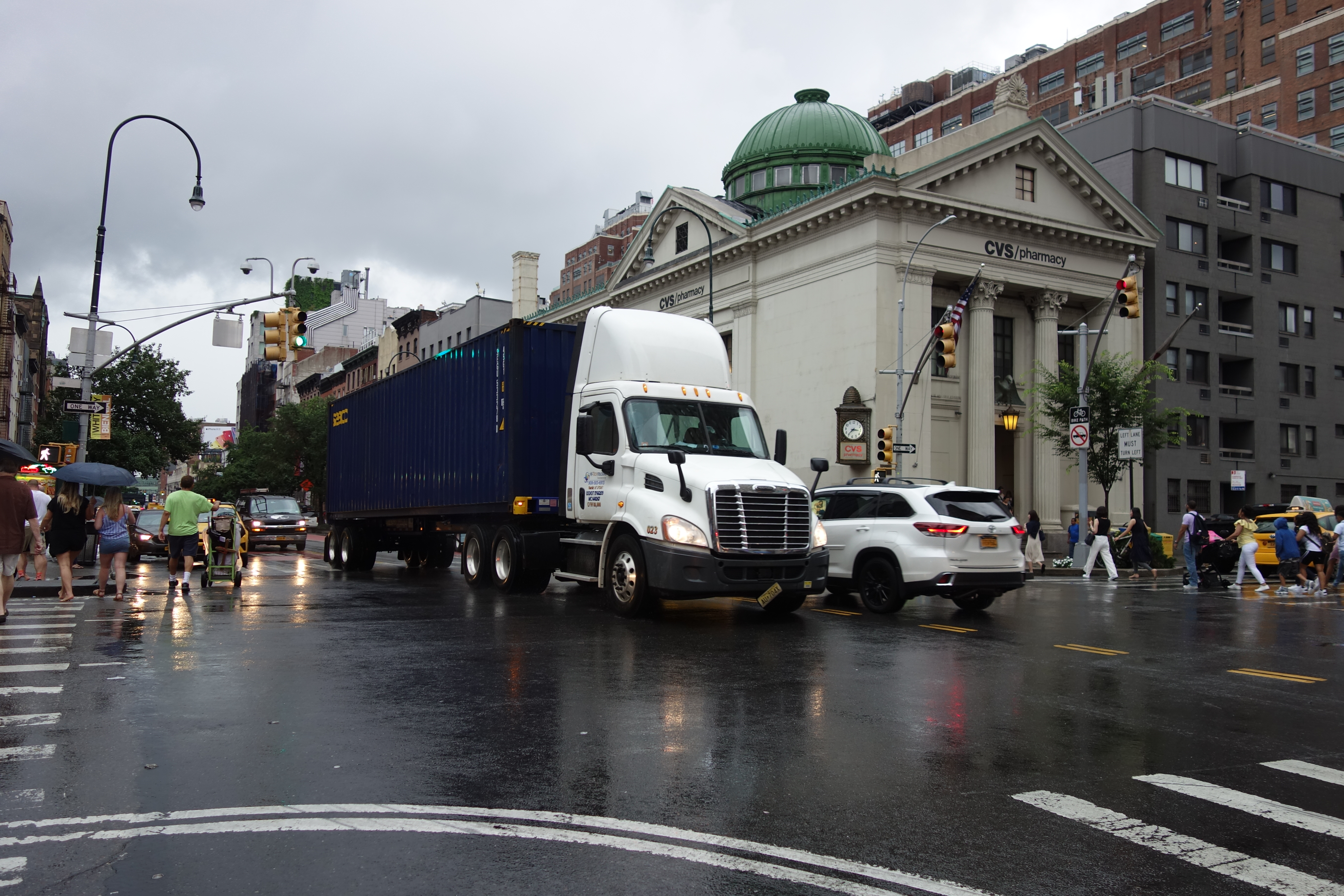
First generation day cab Cascadia

The Freightliner Cascadia is a heavy-duty semi-trailer truck produced by Freightliner Trucks. The Freightliner Cascadia was designed with fuel efficiency in mind, as well as improving upon several other features including the powertrain offerings, sound mitigation, safety systems, and overall mechanical reliability from its predecessors. It is offered in three basic configurations: Day Cab, Mid-Roof XT, and Raised Roof. The latter two models are sleeper cabs, offered in various lengths, ranging from 48 to 72 inches (Raised Roof models available for 60” or 72” lengths only). The Cascadia was sold chiefly in North America until 2020, when an export, primarily geared towards the Australian and New Zealand markets, was introduced. Before the introduction of the export variant, its place remained occupied by the Freightliner Century (no longer in US production) for export markets.

== Cascadia Evolution ==
The Cascadia Evolution is a more fuel-efficient version of the Cascadia, released in 2013. Improvements were made to both the aerodynamics and the comfort of the driver. The instrument cluster was redesigned to be easier to read, the seats have improved back and lumbar support, dashboard switches are repositioned with larger, higher contrast text, and a battery-powered auxiliary HVAC system from Thermo King was offered. This system was designed to reduce overnight engine idling, both saving fuel and reducing noise while drivers are asleep.

== 2017 facelift ==
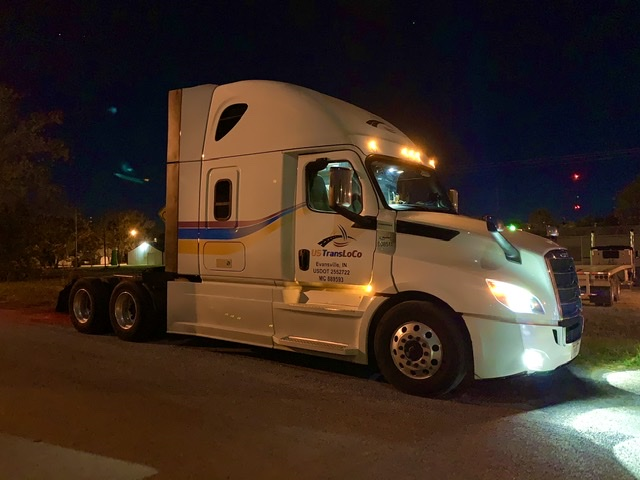
2nd Generation Cascadia at Night

In 2017, the Cascadia received a major design revision for the 2018 model year. The general design of the body is the same except for revised chassis fairings and longer cab extenders. The 2018 Cascadia's exterior facelift consisted of a hood cowl with a more sculpted and aggressive design, along with a redesigned front bumper, a larger grille, and the addition of all-LED headlights. The new hood mirrors were more aerodynamic and improved bumper air dams were installed.

Major updates were made to the truck's interior. The new revision included a new dashboard and more ergonomic seats. The Cascadia's sleeper contains a larger bunk, redesigned storage cabinets, and "aircraft-inspired" dimmable LED ceiling lights. An optional "driver's loft" feature adds a collapsible table and two collapsible seats, all of which stow underneath an extra-wide Murphy-style bunk.

Battery-powered HVAC systems remain an option, however, in addition to the Thermo King units seen on the Cascadia Evolution, Freightliner now offers an internally manufactured equivalent system as well.

Other features of the truck include the Detroit DT12 automated manual transmission, ultra-quiet door and window seals, a single panel windshield, all LED marker lights and taillights, and a suite of active and passive safety systems, including blind-spot monitoring, collision mitigation system, and lane-keeping assistance.

The second-generation Cascadia is produced in the same three configurations as its predecessors, Day Cab, Mid-roof XT, and Raised Roof.

The Interior is from the Mercedes-Benz Actros (2014 Facelift).

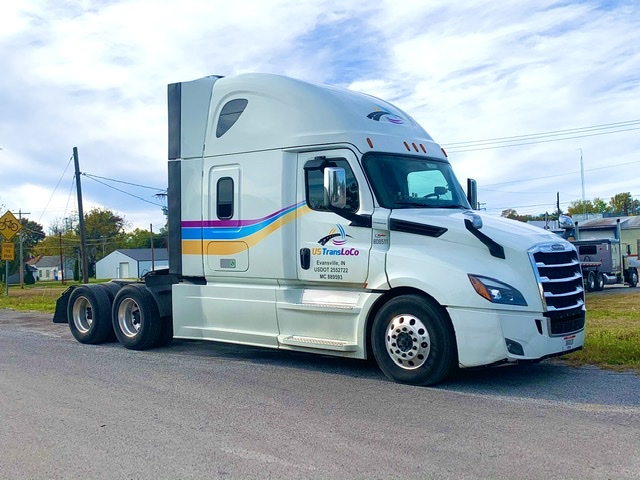
2nd Generation Cascadia in Daylight

== eCascadia ==
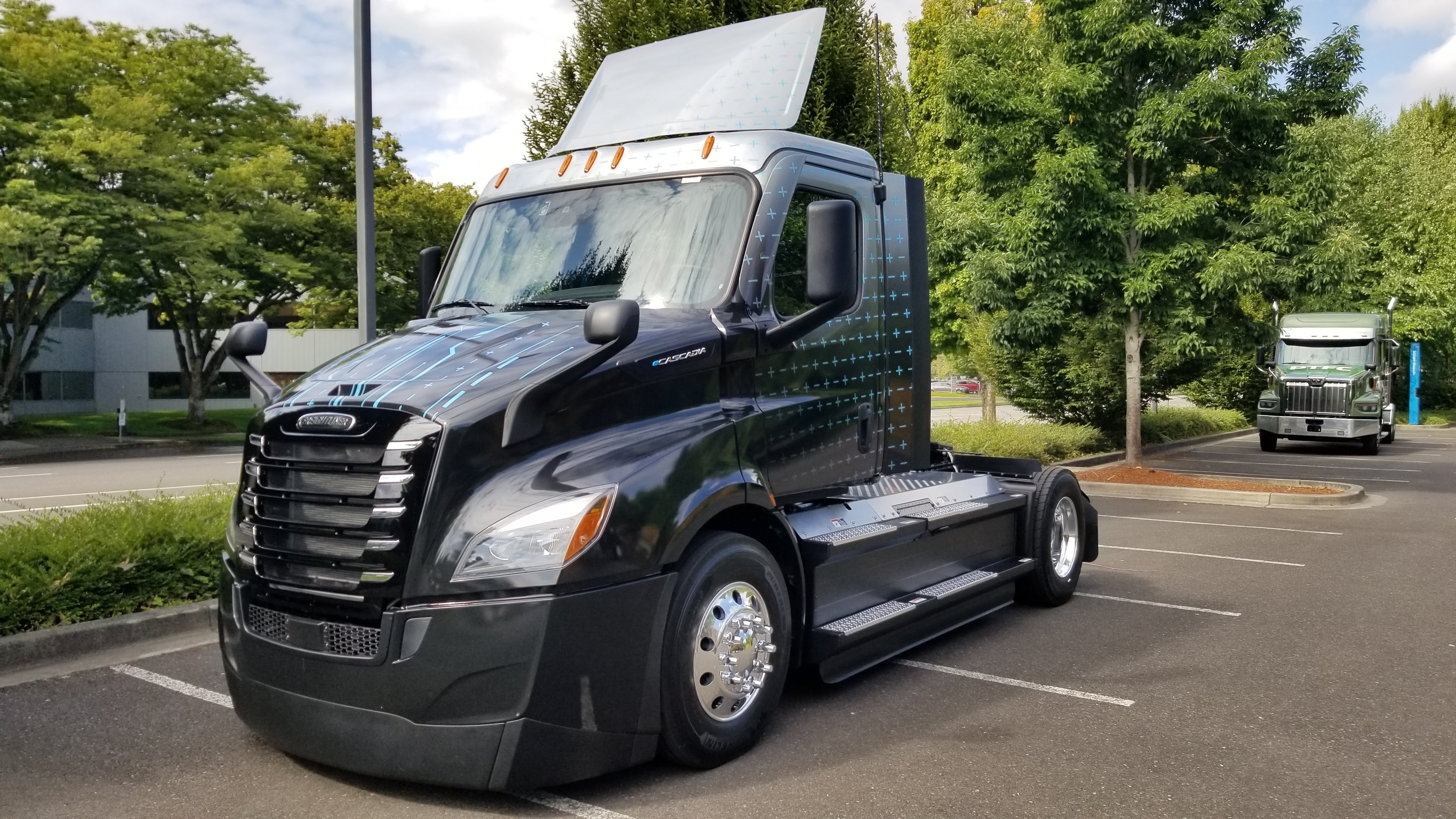
Freightliner eCascadia

The eCascadia is an all-electric truck variant of the Cascadia. As of 2022, the specifications of the long-range variant include a range of 230 mi (370 km) (single-drive) or 220 mi (350 km) (tandem-drive), using 438-kWh batteries, and 320–470 hp (240–350 kW), with charging to 80% in 90 minutes. It has a GCWR of up to 82,000 lb (37,000 kg) and will compete with the Tesla Semi.

In August 2019, the first two eCascadias were delivered to customers in California as part of field tests. The manufacturer stated that the trucks are built "to test the integration of battery-electric trucks [into] large-scale fleet operations". One of the customers, Penske, will be operating the truck "in regional traffic in Southern California" while the other, NFI, will use it in drayage operations at the Port of Los Angeles and the Port of Long Beach.

Order books opened in 2021, and one order was for 800 trucks.

After testing a prototype to more than 1 million miles (1.6 million kilometers), production and official premiere took place in May 2022.

== See also ==
- Freightliner Business Class M2
