= Freightliner Trucks =

American truck manufacturer

- Type: Subsidiary
- Industry: Automotive
- Founded: 1942; 84 years ago (as Freightliner Inc)
- Founder: Leland James
- Headquarters: Portland, Oregon, U.S.
- Area served: United States; Europe; Australia; New Zealand; Canada; Mexico
- Key people: John O'Leary (CEO)
- Products: Commercial Vehicles, Luxury vehicles
- Owner: Daimler Truck
- Parent: Daimler Truck North America
- Website: freightliner.com

Freightliner Trucks is an American semi truck manufacturer. Founded in 1929 as the truck-manufacturing division of Consolidated Freightways (from which it derives its name), the company was established in 1942 as Freightliner Corporation. Owned by Daimler Truck from 1981 to 2021, Freightliner is now a part of Daimler Truck subsidiary Daimler Truck North America (along with Western Star, Detroit Diesel, and Thomas Built Buses).

Freightliner produces a range of vans, medium-duty trucks, and heavy-duty trucks; under its Freightliner Custom Chassis subsidiary, the company produces bare chassis and cutaway chassis for multiple types of vehicles. The company popularized the use of cabover (COE) semitractors, with the Freightliner Argosy later becoming the final example of the type sold in North America.

The company is headquartered in Portland, Oregon (the city of its founding); vehicles are currently manufactured in Cleveland, North Carolina, and Mount Holly, North Carolina, and Santiago Tianguistenco and Saltillo, Mexico.

== History ==
=== Founding (1930s) ===
Freightliner traces its roots to 1929; following the founding of Consolidated Freightways (CF) in Portland, Oregon, company founder Leland James set up a company division to produce semitractors for company use. Developed in a CF maintenance facility, Freightways Manufacturing used Fageol vehicles as a starting point for the design, placing the cab above the front axle. Shorter in length, the new Freightways truck allowed for CF to use a longer trailer and remain in compliance of the stringent length laws of the time.

In line with the company name, during the 1930s, Freightways Manufacturing began to brand its truck production under the "Freightliner" name. In addition to their shorter length, the trucks underwent weight reduction using aluminum instead of steel to maximize use of engine power (needed to climb mountain grades in the western United States).

=== 1940s–1950s ===
In 1942, Leland James renamed Freightways Manufacturing as Freightliner Corporation; as part of the launch, the company debuted the first truck with an all-aluminum cab. Shifting to military production during World War II, Freightliner resumed truck production in 1947. In 1949, Freightliner sold its first vehicle outside of CF (to Portland-based forklift manufacturer Hyster); the vehicle is preserved in the Smithsonian collection in Washington, D.C.

As it largely existed as a subsidiary of a trucking company, Freightliner sought to establish a distribution network for its product line, allowing for higher production volumes and reduced costs. In 1951, Freightliner entered into an agreement with White Motor Company of Cleveland, Ohio. One of the largest truck manufacturers in the United States at the time, White sold Freightliner COEs under the "White Freightliner" co-branding (all vehicles produced for CF were Freightliners).

In 1953, Freightliner introduced a cab with an overhead-mounted sleeper (further shortening the cab). The first-generation "shovelnose" cab was retired for 1954 in favor of the taller, flatter "WFT" design; as an option, a "Mountaineer" 4x4 system was offered.

For 1958, the cab design was updated to tilt forward 90 degrees, increasing access to the engine.

=== 1960s ===
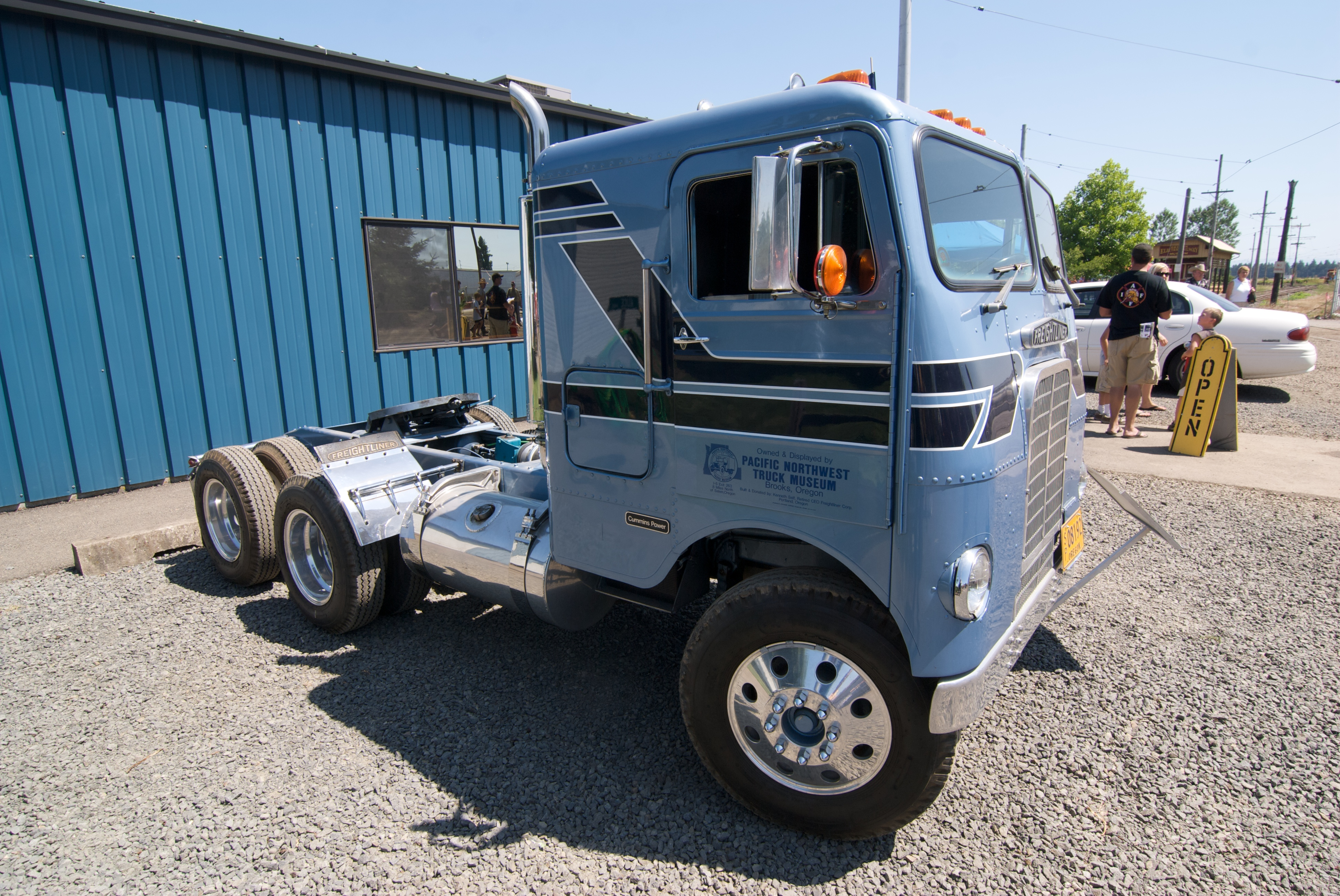
White Freightliner WFT

To reduce import tariffs imposed by Canada (later removed by Auto Pact), Freightliner opened its first Canadian manufacturing facility in 1961, in Burnaby, British Columbia. To increase production in the United States, assembly plants were opened in Chino, California, and Indianapolis, Indiana. In 1969, a second facility was opened in Portland for parts production.

=== 1970s ===
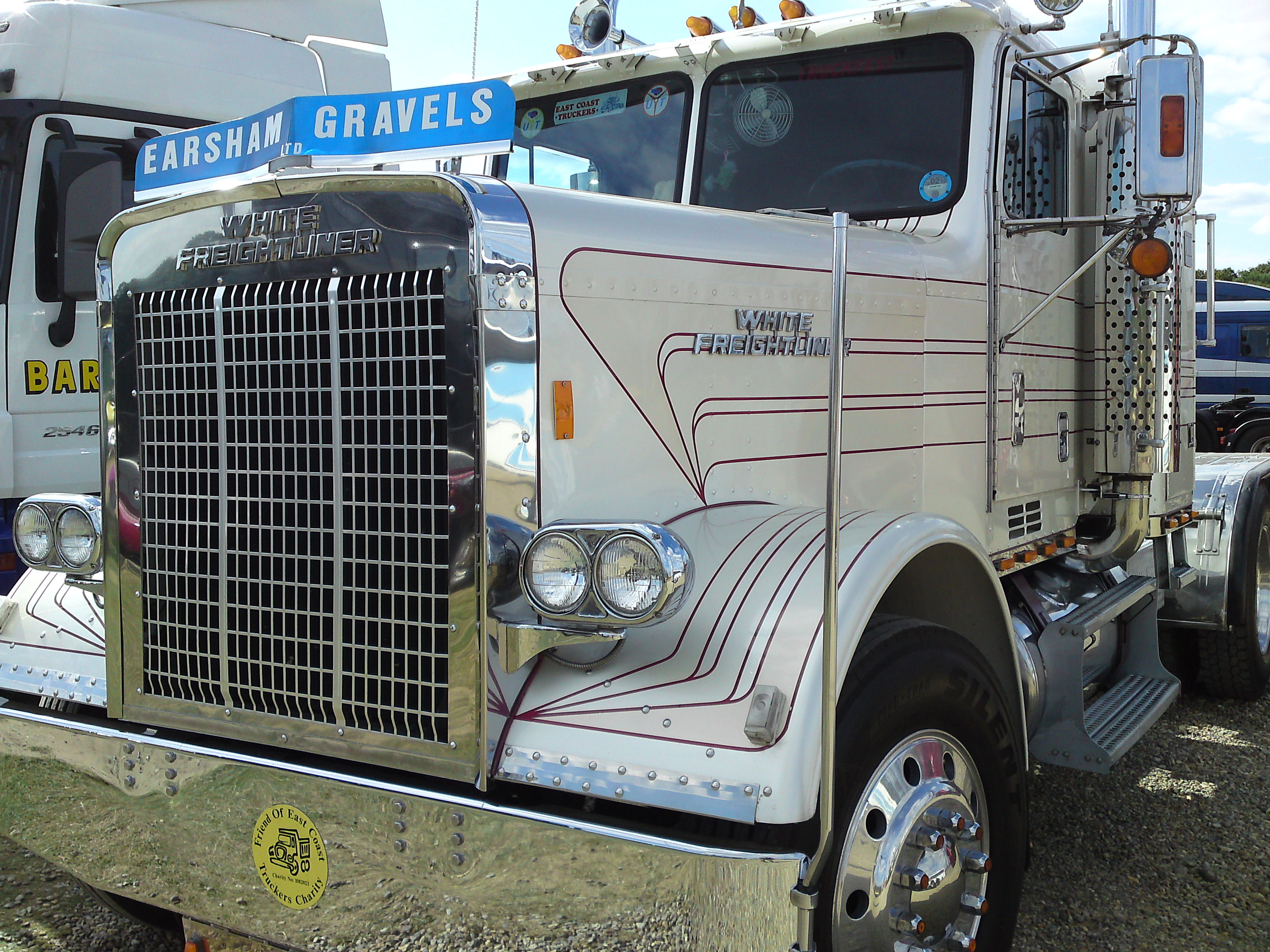
1974-1976 White Freightliner WFC120

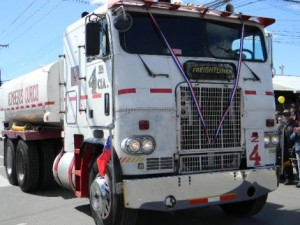
Freightliner FLT cabover (1976–1986)

White Motor Company became troubled in the 1970s. Expansion into appliances and agricultural equipment consumed capital without producing a return, and the relationship with Consolidated Freightways became frayed. In 1974, the distribution agreement was terminated, and Freightliner Corp. began life as a freestanding manufacturer and distributor. Many of the first dealers were from the White Motor Co. network, but some entrepreneurs also signed up to represent the trucks without the White Motor Co. franchise as a complement.

At the same time, the company introduced its first conventional model, an adaptation of the high COE mainstay product. High COEs accounted for well over 50% of the US market in those days, owing to overall length regulations that limited the bumper-to-taillight dimension of a semitrailer unit to 55 ft on interstate highways. Conventionals were popular on western roads due to more convenient ingress/egress, better ride, and easier access to the engine for servicing.

In 1979, a new plant in Mount Holly, North Carolina, and a parts manufacturing plant in Gastonia, North Carolina, were constructed, both in the Charlotte metropolitan area. Volumes continued to increase.

The year 1979 marked a consequential event in the evolution of Freightliner, and of the whole trucking and truck manufacturing industries. President Carter signed bills into law deregulating transport both on the ground and in the skies. Deregulation changed the economics of trucking and removed the system of regulated carriage that protected carriers, instead allowing more competition.

=== 1980s ===
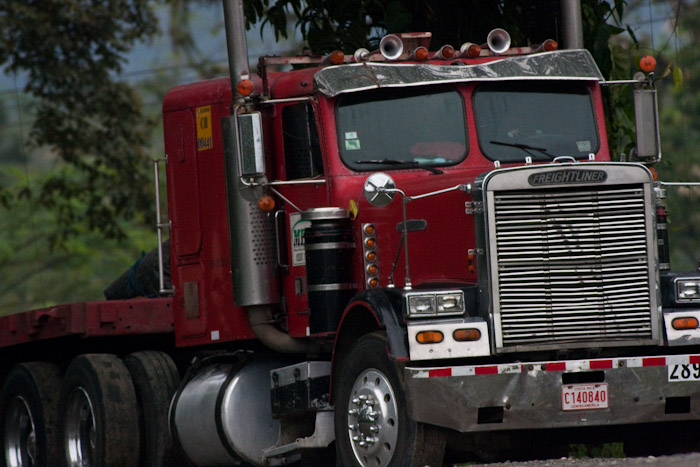
a Freightliner FLC-120

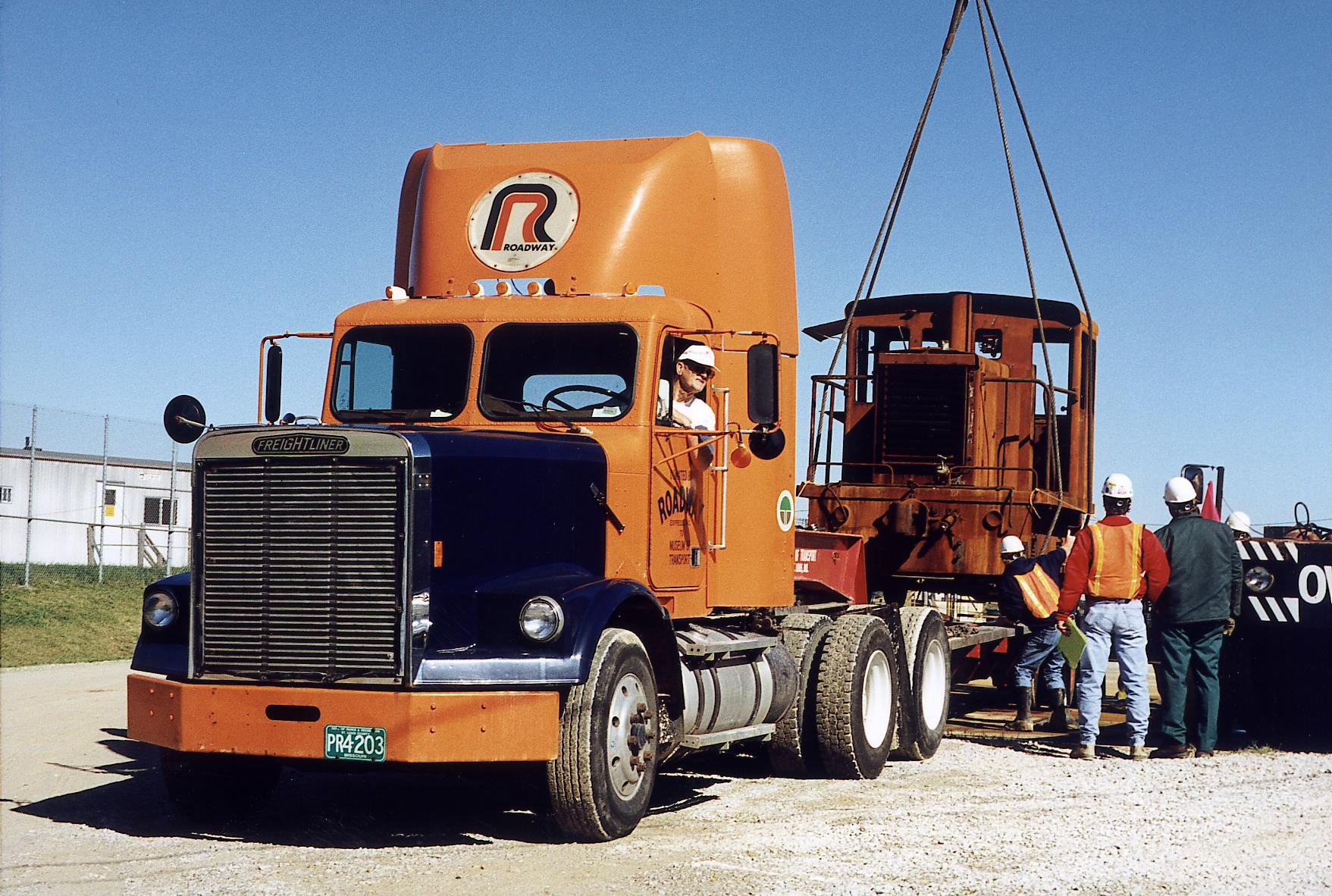
A Freightliner FLC-120 with a set back axle

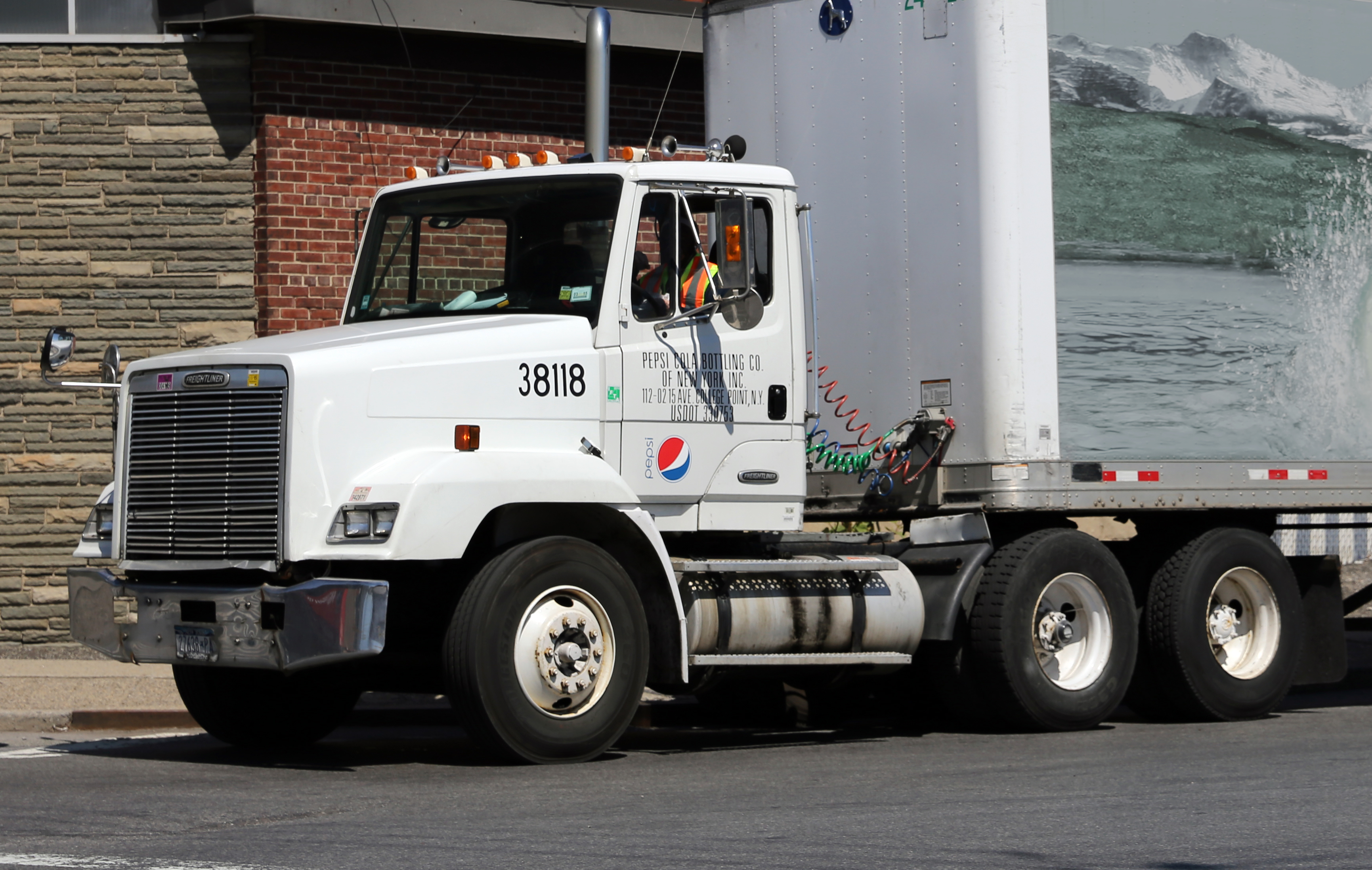
Freightliner FLC-112

Three years later, the Surface Transportation Assistance Act of 1982 relaxed weight and length standards and imposed a new excise tax on heavy trucks and the tires they use. No longer was the overall length of semitrailer combinations restricted. Individual states retained more restrictive overall length laws, but fundamentally, the rules had changed forever.

Consolidated Freightways, a traditional, unionized carrier that flourished in the era before deregulation, realized it was in a fight for its life. In May 1981, it sold its truck manufacturing business and the Freightliner brand to Daimler-Benz, allowing it to concentrate its management attention and financial resources on its traditional trucking business. Around this time, the Chino and Indianapolis plants were closed permanently. Consolidated Freightways continued carrier business until 2002, when it ceased operation on Labor Day weekend.

In 1985 Freightliner introduced a new Medium Conventional series (FLC112), using the passenger portion of the cabin from the then recently introduced Mercedes-Benz LK. Mercedes cabins gradually became used for a number of Freightliner trucks. In 1989, Freightliner acquired a standing plant in Cleveland, North Carolina, near Statesville, that had been producing transit buses for German manufacturer MAN.

=== 1990s ===
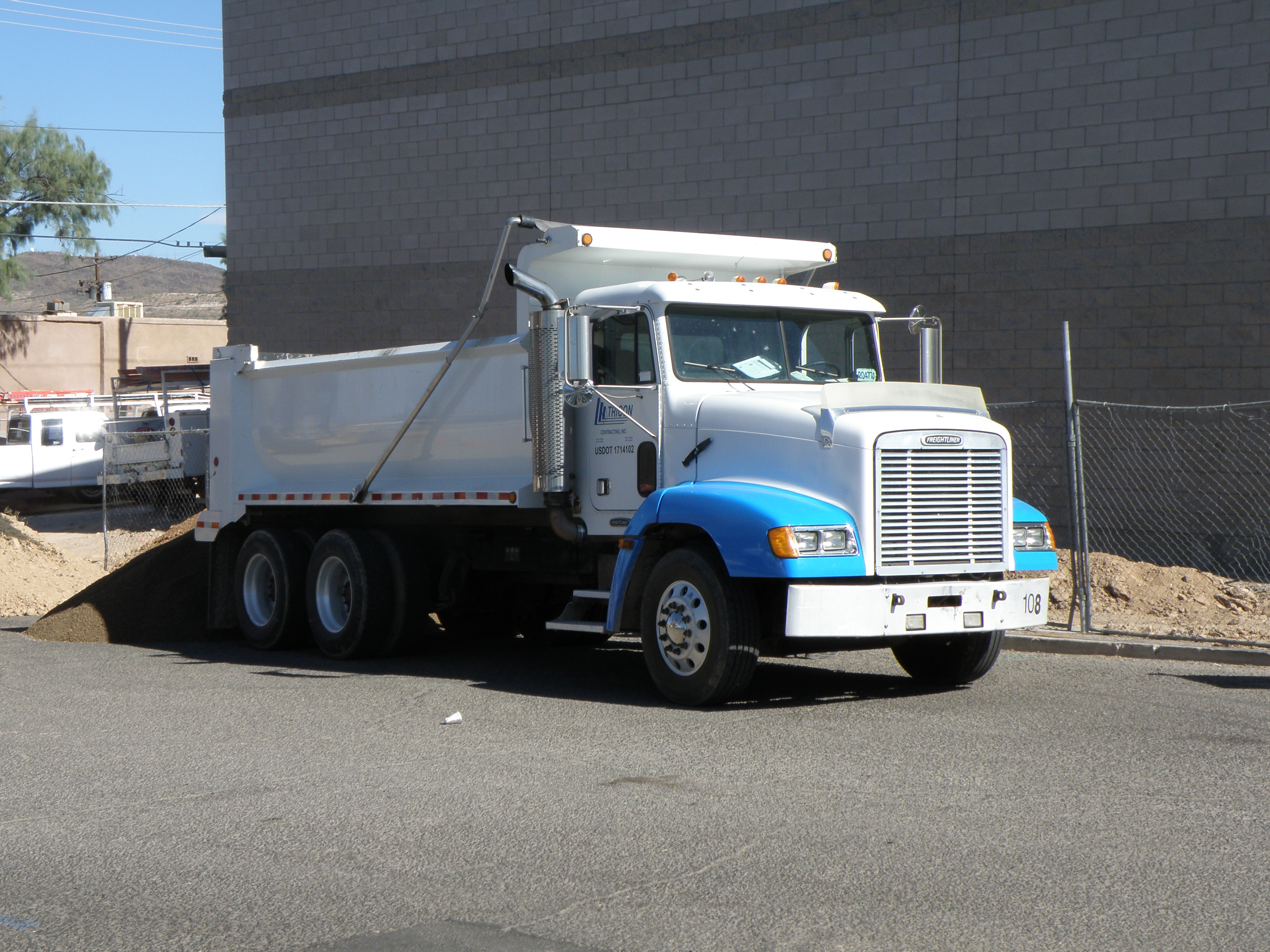
Freightliner FLD 112

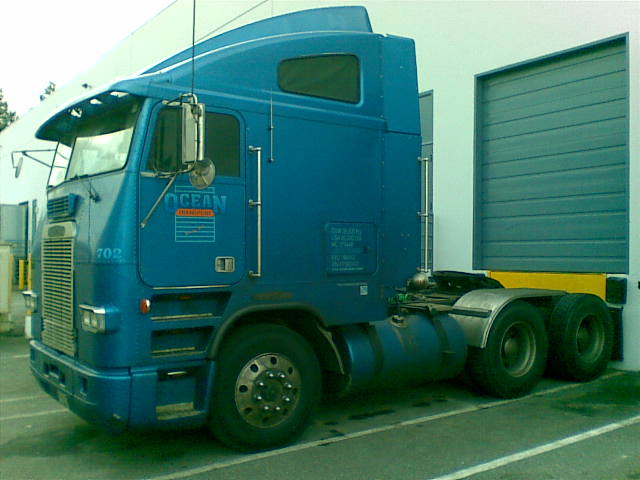
Freightliner FLA COE

In 1991, parent company Daimler-Benz withdrew from the medium-duty truck segment, shifting its presence to Freightliner. Serving as the replacement for the aging Mercedes-Benz L1117, the Business Class made its debut. Also called the FL series, the Business Class was a downsized version of the FLC112, sharing its cab with the Mercedes-Benz LKN cabover. Along with a lighter GVWR, the FL was given a shorter hood with two headlights. The first all-new entry in the medium-duty market in over a decade, the model line met with success.

Another pronounced downturn in the industry's fortunes necessitated drastic measures to restore Freightliner to financial health, and Dieter Zetsche, now the chairman of Daimler-Benz's Board of Management, was dispatched to lead the project as CEO. The Burnaby assembly plant was closed, replaced by a new facility in St. Thomas, Ontario. Cost reduction programs across the company restored profitability when the market rebounded. Significantly, production also commenced in Santiago Tianguistenco, Mexico, about 30 miles (48 km) outside Mexico City, in a plant owned by Daimler-Benz. At that time, the plant was also producing buses, Brazilian-designed medium-duty trucks, and compact Mercedes-Benz passenger cars.

Following the introduction of the medium-duty Business Class, Freightliner saw further evolution to its model range. For 1996, the company introduced the Freightliner Century Class, its first completely new Class 8 conventional in over 20 years. A year later, the company began production of cowled bus chassis, with the FS-65 derived from the medium-duty Business Class. For 1999 production, the Freightliner Argosy debuted; directly replacing the FLB, the Argosy consolidated four previous Freightliner COEs into a single model range. The first clean-sheet COE design from Freightliner since the Daimler acquisition, the Argosy largely eliminated the engine intrusion into the cab, sharing many body components and electronics with the Century Class conventional. In 1997, Freightliner acquired the truck-producing division of the Ford Motor Company and rebranded it as Sterling.

In 1999, Freightliner built its one-millionth vehicle. The Century Class conventional model family was expanded, adding the Columbia conventional. While sharing the same cab structure, the Columbia is developed primarily for fleet applications (though both model lines become popular with owner-operators).

==== Company diversification ====
The 1990s were a busy era for truck manufacturers in general, and for Freightliner in particular, under the leadership of flamboyant James L. Hebe, a former Kenworth sales executive who joined the company in 1989. During the decade, Freightliner made numerous acquisitions to further diversify itself:

1995 – Oshkosh Custom Chassis in Gaffney, South Carolina, became Freightliner Custom Chassis, producing the underpinnings for walk-in vans used by companies such as UPS to deliver parcels and Cintas for uniform laundry services; diesel recreational vehicles; conventional school buses; and shuttle buses. The Oshkosh and Freightliner partnership has dissolved, and Oshkosh is no longer affiliated with Freightliner.

1996 – American LaFrance was purchased; a 130-year-old manufacturer of fire apparatus, it was Mr. Hebe's first employer. American LaFrance had fallen on hard times and was moribund at the time of the acquisition. At the end of the year, Freightliner acquired the rights of the heavy-truck product lines of Ford Motor Company.

1997 – As a result of the Ford heavy-truck acquisition, Freightliner created Sterling Trucks (using a long-dormant nameplate once owned by White Motor Company). Intended primarily as vocational trucks, the Sterling product line consisted of rebranded versions of the Ford Louisville/AeroMax and Ford Cargo.

1998 – Freightliner acquires bus manufacturer Thomas Built Buses, based in High Point, North Carolina. Sterling-brand trucks entered production in St. Thomas, Ontario (sold concurrently with the final Ford heavy trucks).

=== 2000s ===
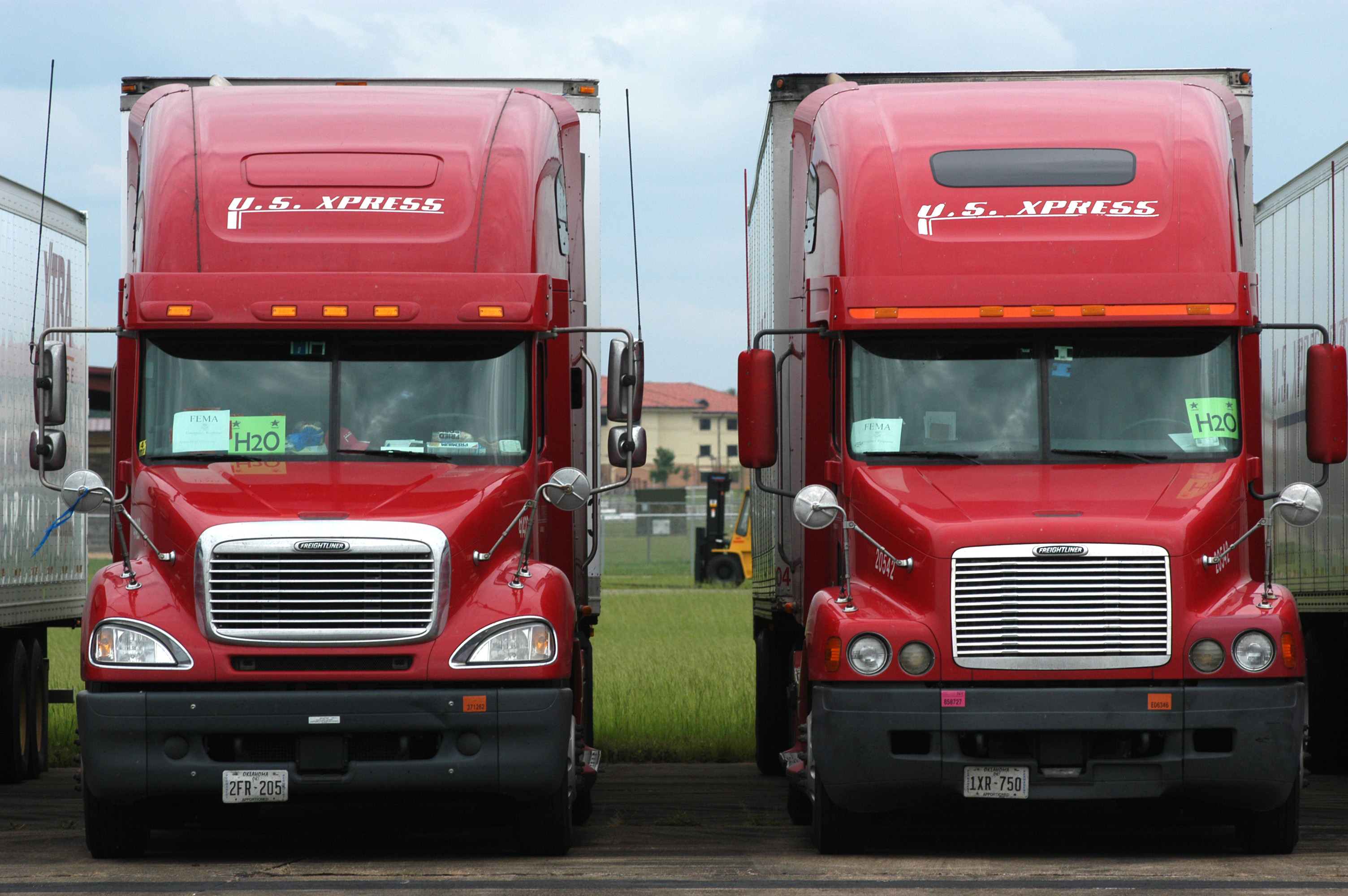
Freightliner Columbia (left) and Century Class (right)

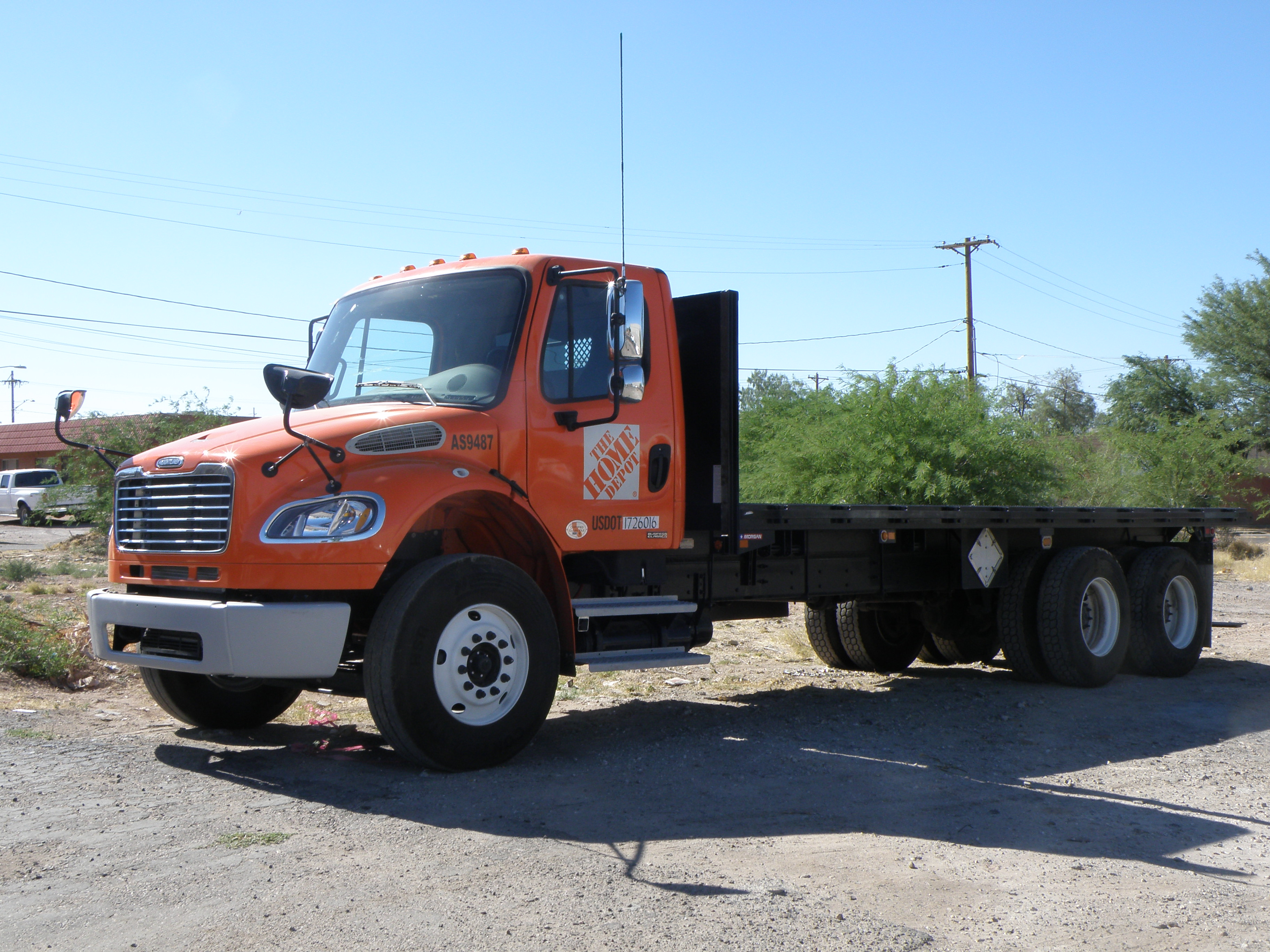
Freightliner Business Class M2

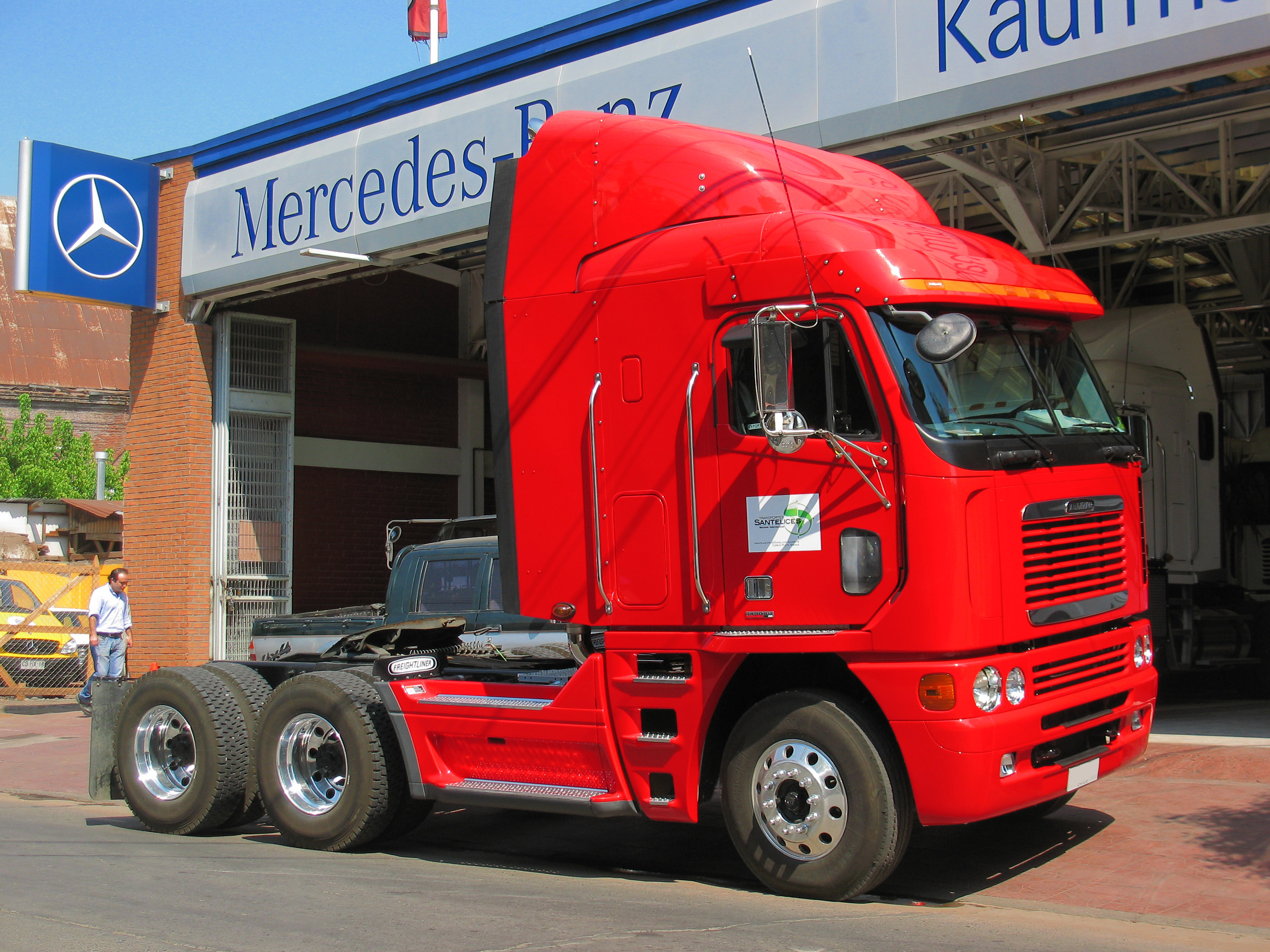
Freightliner Argosy

At the beginning of the 21st century, Freightliner was part of DaimlerChrysler, following the 1998 merger of its parent company with Chrysler; several changes in 2000 were made by the merged company that affected Freightliner. Canadian-based Western Star Trucks, a premium truck manufacturer was acquired in its entirety, giving Freightliner a third truck brand (along with assembly plants in Kelowna, British Columbia, and Ladson, South Carolina). Originally an entity of General Motors, DaimlerChrysler acquired Detroit Diesel, integrating its operations within Freightliner.

Coinciding with the fragile economy, Freightliner was awash in used trucks it could not sell; following the rapid expansion of the previous decade, Freightliner was left with multiple poor-performing operations outside of its core truck brand which was in decline in a poor economy. Seeking new leadership, DaimlerChrysler installed former company CFO to begin a turnaround for Freightliner. By 2002, the Kelowna Western Star plant was closed (shifting to Portland), along with a Thomas facility in Woodstock, Ontario (consolidating entirely to High Point).

In 2001 and 2002, the Freightliner product line underwent multiple updates. The Century Class model family was expanded further, debuting the Freightliner Coronado premium conventional. Styled similar to the FLD132 Classic XL, the Coronado shared its cab structure and technology with the Century Class and Columbia, marketed towards owner-operators. In a further expansion of the vocational model line, the Freightliner Condor was introduced as the first low-entry COE; competing with the Autocar Xpeditor, the Condor was developed nearly entirely for refuse applications. For the medium-duty segment, Freightliner introduced a second generation of the Business Class, the Business Class M2, ranging from Class 5 to Class 8 severe-service conventionals. In place of the cab derived from Mercedes-Benz, the M2 was designed entirely by Freightliner.

In the early 2000s, the operations of Freightliner subsidiaries would undergo multiple changes. Following the acquisition of Western Star Trucks, Freightliner consolidated production of American LaFrance in the previous Western Star plant in Ladson, South Carolina; the attempt to integrate production of specialized emergency vehicles into a company noted for high volume production capabilities proved unworkable. While remaining the fifth-largest manufacturer in the emergency vehicle segment, American LaFrance was sold in 2005 to private equity fund, with DaimlerChrysler retaining ownership of the Ladson factory.

For 2006, the Sprinter van underwent a redesign (for the first time); final assembly shifts to the former American LaFrance facility in Ladson, South Carolina. While sold nearly exclusively as a cargo van, the Freightliner Sprinter is also offered as a passenger vehicle (alongside Dodge and Mercedes-Benz Sprinters).

After 2006 production, Freightliner ended sales of the Argosy cabover in North America. The first company to produce a fully tilting cab, Freightliner was the final truck manufacturer in North America to offer a Class 8 cabover. The Argosy remains in production in North America, sold exclusively for export.

In the summer of 2007, DaimlerChrysler was split, with the Freightliner parent company reorganizing itself as Daimler AG. Freightliner begins production of trucks in Saltillo, Mexico. On January 7, 2008, Freightliner LLC was renamed Daimler Trucks North America, LLC (DTNA), operating as the parent company of the Freightliner Trucks brand, alongside Sterling, Western Star, Detroit Diesel, and Thomas Built Buses.

For 2008, the company introduced Freightliner Cascadia, a new-generation Class 8 conventional. Intended as the successor to the Century Class and Columbia, the Cascadia consolidated the two model lines; while styled as a scaled-up M2, the Cascadia was optimized for fuel economy, safety, and reliability. Within the vocational model line, the Condor low-entry COE was discontinued.

In 2009, Freightliner began production of natural gas versions of the Business Class M2 in its Mount Holly facility. In March 2009, DTNA discontinued Sterling Trucks, citing substantial model overlap with Freightliner and decreasing market share (in spite of multiple product launches). The closure of Sterling also brought a closure of the St. Thomas plant.

=== 2010s ===
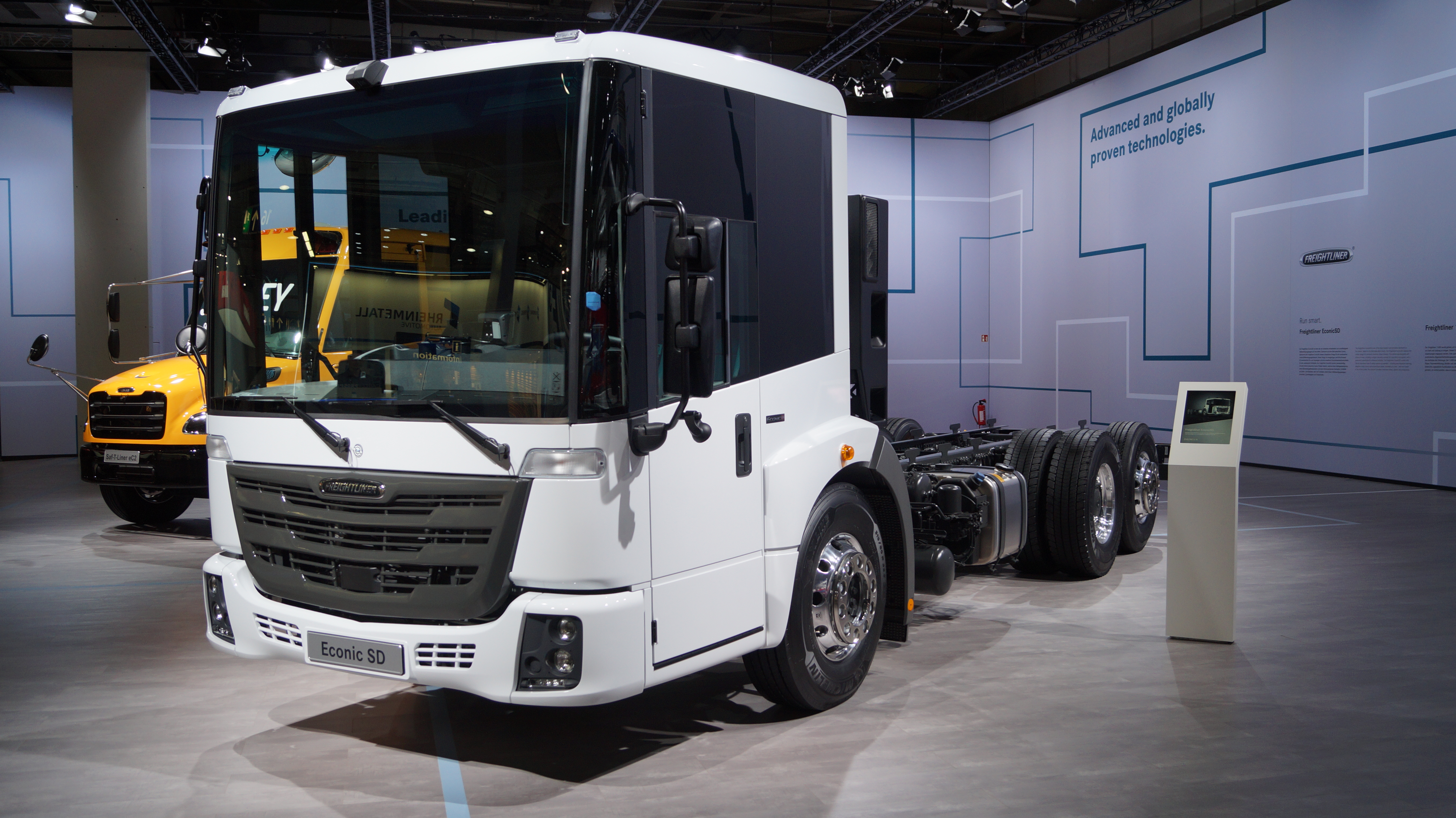
Freightliner EconicSD

Following the closure of Sterling, the Freightliner model line underwent a transition. While the M2 remained unchanged, the FLD 120/132 Classic/Classic XL were discontinued for 2010; after the model year, the Columbia and Century Class were also discontinued (in North America). In line with the Argosy, production of the Century Class shifted entirely to export. The Coronado long-hood conventional was joined by the Coronado SD (developed primarily for vocational applications).

In 2010, Freightliner introduced its first diesel-electric hybrid vehicle, based on a M2 106.

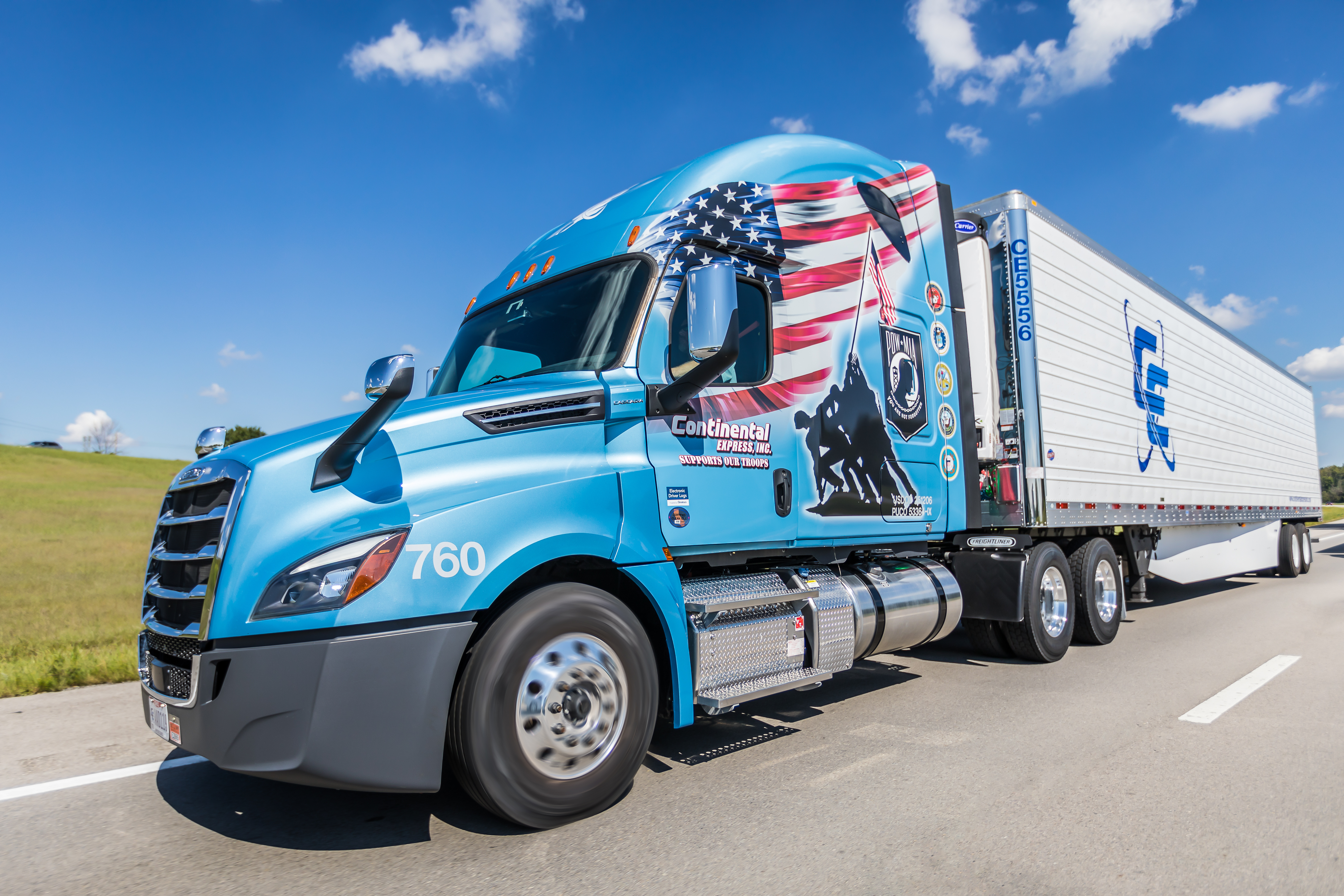
Freightliner New Cascadia

For 2011, the company debuted the SD model family. Alongside the Coronado SD introduced the previous year, two new models were added, the 108SD and 114SD, derived from the M2 model family. In 2012, Freightliner celebrated its 70th anniversary, unveiling the Revolution concept vehicle. Constructed of carbon fiber and plastic, the cab featured a redesigned layout. Intended for use by a single driver, the passenger seat was replaced by a jumpseat (converting into a sleeper bed); to optimize trailer hookups, the design included a rear access door. As a result of increased demand for the Cascadia, parent company DTNA announced plans in 2012 to expand its workforce at its Cleveland, NC, facility. Alongside the Cascadia, nearly 20% of trucks produced by the plant (including the Argosy and Century Class) were exported to South Africa, Australia and New Zealand.

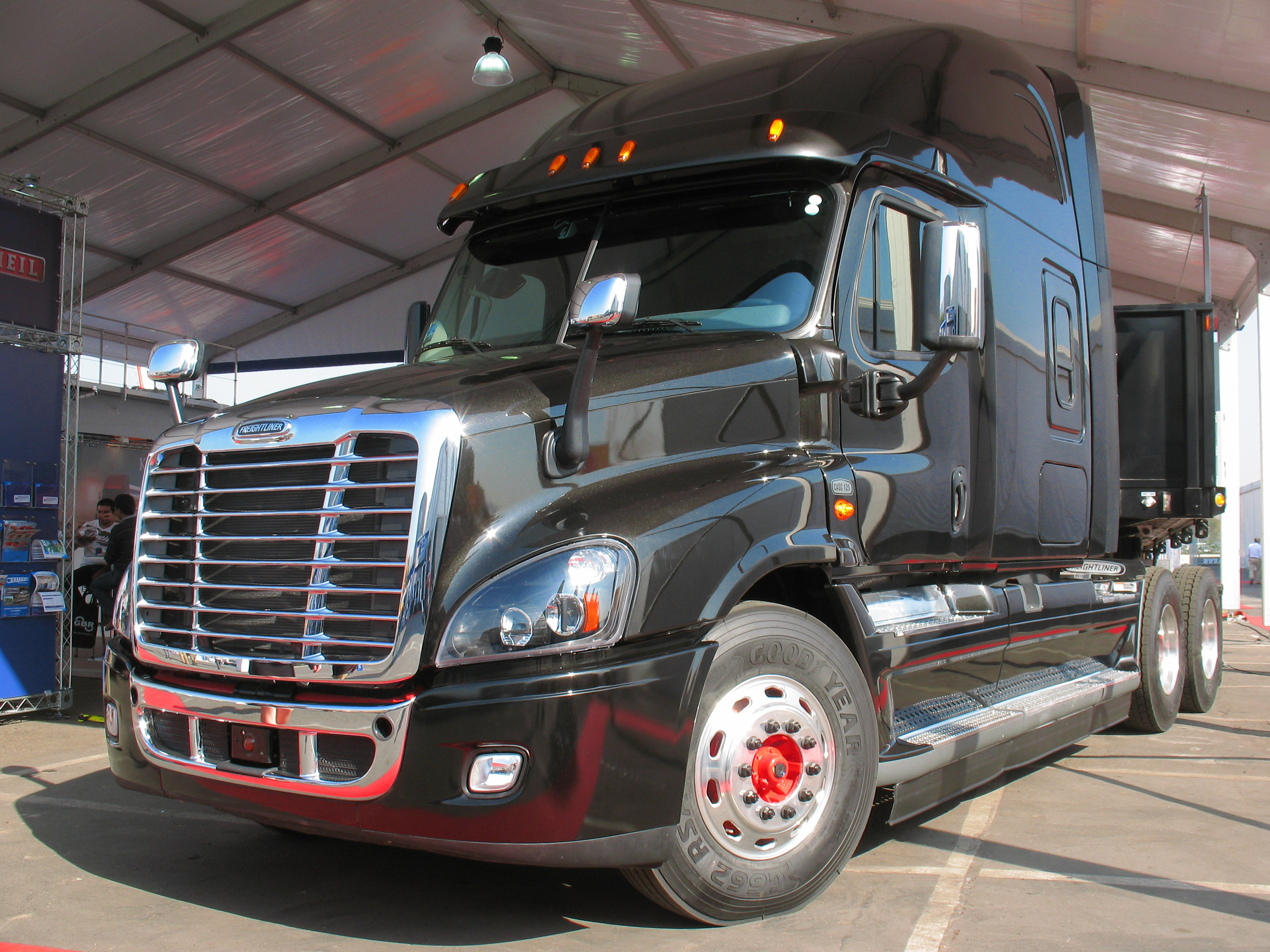
Freightliner Cascadia

In 2013, Freightliner expanded its alternative-fuel lineup, adding a natural-gas version of the Cascadia. Introduced as a premium option for the Cascadia, the Cascadia Evolution further enhanced aerodynamics and fuel economy (distinguished by its full rear wheel covers) and improved interior features. The Coronado was added to SD model family, renamed the 122SD.

On August 22, 2014, the Cleveland plant built the 3 millionth vehicle of Daimler Truck North America, a 2015 Cascadia Evolution. At the time, Freightliner employed 2600 workers at the facility and 8000 employees in North Carolina.

In May 2015, the Freightliner Inspiration was unveiled near Hoover Dam. The first road-licensed autonomous semitruck, the Inspiration was loosely based on a Cascadia. A Level 3 autonomous vehicle, the autonomous driving system was equated to the autopilot system of an airliner or a Tesla (requiring operator presence).

For 2017 production, Freightliner introduced a second-generation Cascadia, adopting elements of the design from the Inspiration autonomous vehicle. Freightliner trucks built under the GHG17 emissions standard include onboard diagnostic systems that generate standardized fault codes for components such as the engine, aftertreatment system, and transmission.

For 2018, Freightliner debuted the EconicSD low-entry COE. Intended largely for refuse applications, the model line is an adaptation of the Mercedes-Benz Econic.

In September 2019, parent company Daimler announced that it would be halting "its internal combustion engine development initiatives as part of its efforts to embrace electric vehicles."

=== 2020s ===
As of May 2022, the MT-series step van (called MT50e) is available as an all-electric vehicle, and so are school buses built on Freightliner's chassis. Also, the eCascadia, an all-electric semi-truck by Freightliner, was handed to customers for field tests in 2019, then officially premiered in May 2022. An all-electric variant of the M2 box truck has undergone field tests. In 2022, Freightliner revealed an update for the M2 Business Class series.

== Models ==
Models of Freightliner trucks over the decades have included heavy-duty Class 8 trucks, medium-duty Class 5–8 trucks, and various specialty vehicles.

Freightliner Class 8 Trucks
Model Family Name	Production Years	Cab Configuration	Notes
Consolidated Freightways ownership/ White Motors distribution (1942–1974)
WFT (White-Freightliner)	1958–1976	Cabover/COE	First flat-front COE design in North America; replaced Model 600/WF "Shovelnose" Two major design series: 1954–1970 and 1970–1976
WFC (White-Freightliner); WFC 120	1974–1976	Conventional	First White-Freightliner conventional, with 120-inch BBC
Consolidated Freightways ownership (1974–1981)
FLT-Series; FLT; FLT 6442; FLT 9664; FLT 7564	1976–1989	Cabover/COE	Previous WFT line, renamed to reflect the discontinuation of White Motor Company distribution. Basis of 1973–1978 "Powerliner" (featuring high-capacity engine) Produced alongside its FLA successor.
FLC-Series; FLC; FLC 120; FLC 120 64; FLC 120 64 T; FLC 120 84	1977–1987	Conventional	Previous WFC line, renamed after White Motor Company distribution ended. Model update in 1984 Setback axle version produced 1984-1987 FLC112 is unrelated, part of Business Class
FLL-Series	1976 – 1999	Low-entry COE	Low-cab forward COE, intended for vocational applications.Followed design development of FLT/FLA/FLB COEs
Daimler AG ownership (1981–present)
FLA-Series; FLA; FLA 104; FLA 104 64; FLA 75; FLA 7542T; FLA 8662; FLA 8664T; FLA 9664; FLA 9664T	1984 – 1993	Cabover/COE	Replaced WFT/FLT entirely in 1989 Complete structural redesign of cab First set-back axle Freightliner COE (with flat-floor interior).
FLB-Series; FLB; FLB 100 42T; FLB 104 64; FLB 9664	1993 – 1997	Cabover/COE	Replaced FLA, featuring several aerodynamic upgrades Not sold in day-cab configuration
FLD-Series; FLD; FLD 112; FLD 120 42 S; FLD 120 64 ST; FLD 120 64 T; FLD 120 HD; FLD 120 SD; FLD-SD; Classic Series; Classic (FLD 120 SFFA); Classic XL (FLD 132)	1987–2010 (FLD) 1990–2010 (Classic)	Conventional	Aerodynamically-upgraded conventional with skirted sides and curved bumpers and fenders. Produced in 112 and 120-inch BBCs. Classic series (using FLC-style hood) introduced in 1990; produced in 120 and 132-inch BBCs FLD SD (severe-duty) is equipped with "Classic" (FLC-style) hood and fenders. FLD replaced by Century Class and Columbia Classic replaced by Coronado
C-Series; Century Class (C120); Century Class; Century Class S/T; Columbia (CL120); Coronado (CC132); Coronado SD; 122SD; Cascadia (CA125); Cascadia Evolution; New Cascadia; eCascadia; Argosy	1996–present (conventional) 1998–2006 (COE–North America) 1998–2020 (COE–export)	Conventional Cabover/COE (Argosy)	All-new model family, replacing FLD series. Century Class and Columbia: replaced FLD 120 Coronado: replaced Classic/Classic XL (FLD 120 SFFA/ FLD 132) Second generation is Cascadia (2008), replacing Century Class and Columbia Third generation is New Cascadia (2017), replacing Argosy in export. Also produced as eCascadia all-electric truck. Argosy aerodynamically-enhanced COE replaced FL series COEs entirely, sharing structural commonality with the Century Class. Final Class 8 COE produced in North America.
SD-Series; 108SD AB; 114SD AB; 114SD AF; 122SD	2011–present	Conventional	Severe-service/vocational variants of the M2 Business Class 122SD replaced Coronado

Freightliner Medium-Duty (Class 5–7) Trucks
Model Family Name	Production Years	Cab configuration	Notes
Business Class (FL-Series); FLC112; FL50; FL60; FL70; FL80; FL106; FL112	1985–2007	Conventional	First-generation Business Class Shares cab with Mercedes-Benz LKN
Business Class (M2-Series); M2e Hybrid; M2 106; M2 112; M2 106V; M2 112V; M2 106 Plus; M2 112 Plus	2002–Present 2002-2023 2004–2011 2024-Present	Conventional	Second-generation Business Class, Freightliner-designed cab M2 106 - 106-inch BBC; M2 112 - 112-inch BBC M2 106V and 112V replaced in 2011 by SD Series M2 entered its second generation in 2024, becoming M2 Plus
Cargo; FC70; FC80	1999–2007	Low-cab COE	Continuation of Ford Cargo production, adapted to FL-Series chassis Also sold by Sterling (SC7000/SC8000)
Condor	2001–2013	Low-cab COE	Vocational-oriented cabover; developed nearly exclusively for refuse applications Semitractor version was available. Also produced by Sterling Trucks and American LaFrance.
EconicSD	2018–present	Low-entry	Serves as successor to Condor low-cab COE. American version of Mercedes-Benz Econic

Other Freightliner Vehicles
Model Family Name	Production Years	Cab configuration	Notes
MT-Series: MT-35; MT-45; MT-55; MT50e	c. 1995 – present	Step-van chassis	Produced by Freightliner Custom Chassis Corporation MT50e is the electric variant
Freightliner Sprinter	2001–2021	Full-size van	Badge-engineered version of Mercedes-Benz Sprinter; first company to sell the model line in North America. Sold as cargo van (completed in United States from CKD kits) and passenger van (imported from Germany). Mercedes-Benz announced Freightliner Sprinter sales will be discontinued as of December 2021. The Sprinter will continue production and sales through the Mercedes-Benz brand.
FS-65	1997–2006	bus chassis	Cowled bus chassis designed from the Business Class FL chassis; based on FL60 and FL70.
S2	2001–present	Cutaway-cab/chassis	Cutaway cab version of Business Class M2. Available as a cutaway and a shuttle bus.
C2	2004–present	bus chassis	School bus chassis designed for the Thomas Saf-T-Liner C2 body.

== Legal controversy ==
As of December 2020, Freightliner is under a court order to improve safety, and was fined $30 million by the NHTSA after an investigation found that Freightliner had failed to recall dozens of known safety defects in its vehicles. In 2019 alone, Freightliner was forced to issue safety recalls 29 separate times by the NHTSA, and there have been over 100 recalls total on its flagship truck, the Cascadia. The judge found that Freightliner had no system in place to track faults, and ordered $5 million of the fine be applied to upgrading outdated paper-based systems and converting to recall software used by other automakers for decades.

In 2019 the Cascadia was recalled a record 29 times, including two recalls of defective brake control systems, four different recalls for brake components being assembled improperly, brake system capacity being insufficient to stop the vehicle requiring tank upgrades, two ABS defects that failed to trigger warnings after failures, airbags that suddenly deploy without warning, two separate steering system assembly defects that result in the steering system coming apart while driving, steering wheels detaching while driving, clutch failures causing rollaways, and subpar tires with defective cords causing air loss.

As of May 2021, the 2019 Freightliner Cascadia has three open investigations against it for different issues.

In September 2021, Daimler was ordered to recall three years of Cascadia production due to defective steering systems which could come apart while driving.

In 2023 an investigation of Daimler was opened after 18 separate reports of sudden activation of braking systems, which in several cases caused jackknifing or other loss of control.

== See also ==
- List of companies based in Oregon
- Mercedes-Benz Actros
- Mercedes-Benz Zetros
- Mitsubishi Fuso Truck and Bus Corporation
- Western Star Trucks
