= Thomas Saf-T-Liner C2 =

Type C Thomas school bus model

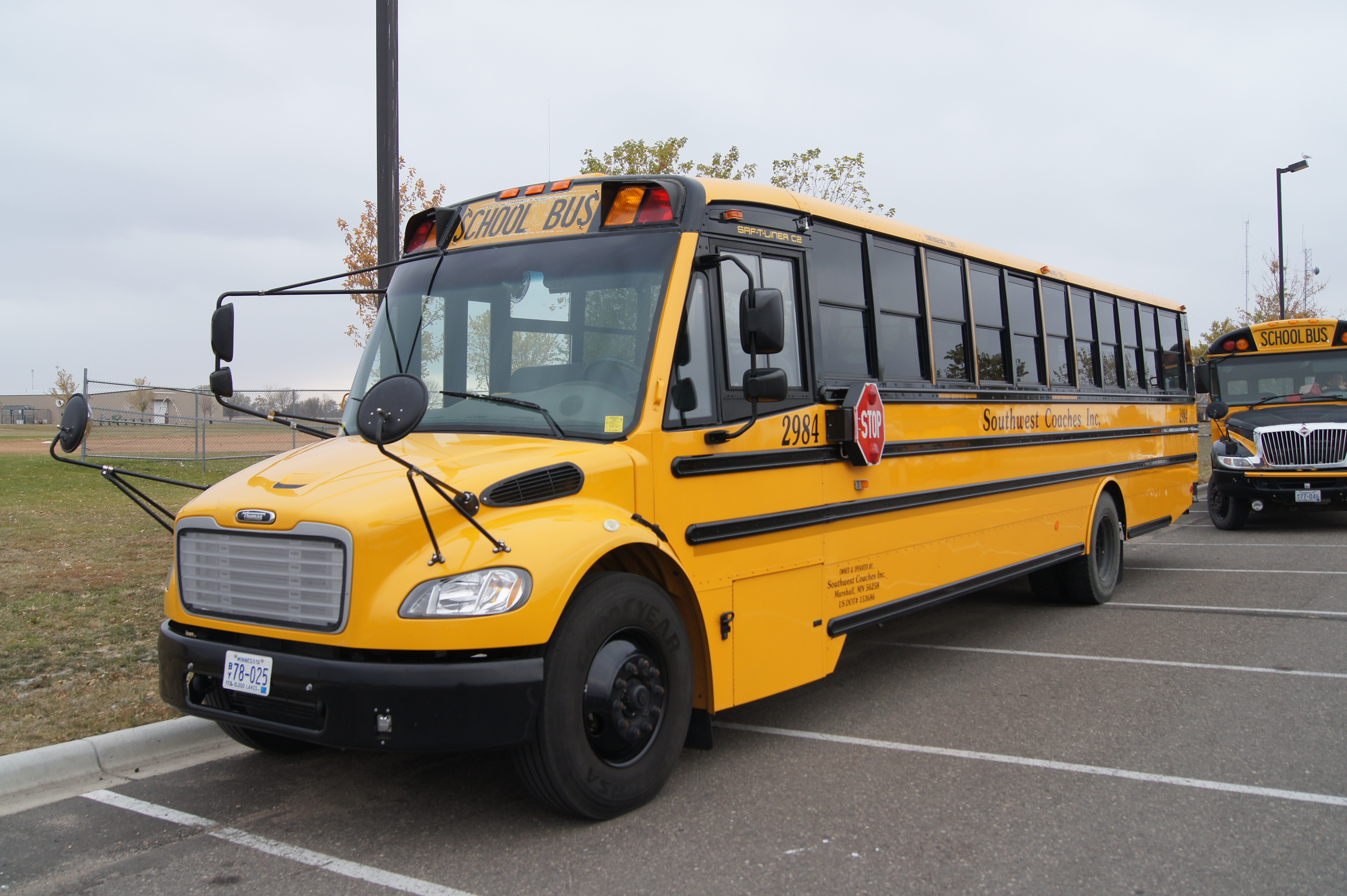
- Front 3/4 view

Overview
- Manufacturer: Thomas Built Buses (Freightliner)
- Production: 2004–present
- Assembly: United States: Gaffney, South Carolina (chassis); High Point, North Carolina (Thomas High Point Plant; manufacturing)
- Designer: John M. Mellberg

Body and chassis
- Class: Type C (conventional)
- Body style: Cowled chassis: School bus; Commercial bus
- Chassis: Freightliner C2
- Related: Freightliner M2 106

Powertrain
- Engine: Diesel; Cummins ISB 200–260 hp (2007–2017; CNG option 2016–2021); Cummins B6.7 " 200–260 hp (2017–present); Caterpillar C7 (2004–2008); Detroit Diesel DD5 5.1 L I4 (2018–2025); Mercedes-Benz MBE 900 (2004–2009); Propane; Powertrain Integration PIthon 8.0 L V8 (2014–2022); Drive Force/PSI 8.8L V8 2019–2022
- Capacity: 14–81
- Transmission: 2-speed automatic (Jouley)
- Battery: 226 kWh (Jouley)
- Plug-in charging: Vehicle-to-grid (V2G)

Dimensions
- Width: 96 in (2,438 mm)
- Curb weight: 18,000–35,000 lb (8,165–15,876 kg) (GVWR)

Chronology
- Predecessor: Thomas Saf-T-Liner Conventional; Thomas Saf-T-Liner FS-65

The Thomas Saf-T-Liner C2 (often shortened to Thomas C2) is a bus manufactured by Thomas Built Buses since 2004. The first cowled-chassis bus designed by Thomas following its acquisition by Freightliner, the C2 debuted the first all-new body design for the company in over three decades. Produced primarily as a yellow school bus, the model line is also produced for commercial use and other specialty configurations.

Distinguished by its tall, single-piece windshield, the C2 uses a chassis derived from the first-generation Freightliner Business Class M2 medium-duty truck. In contrast to previous conventional-style buses, the C2 adopts the dashboard of the medium-duty truck in its entirety. Replacing the previous Saf-T-Liner Conventional/Saf-T-Liner FS-65 (the latter, produced alongside the C2 until December 2006), the C2 inherits several design elements of the 1990s Thomas Vista to improve loading-zone visibility.

Alongside its distinctive exterior, the C2 is also available in up to 81-passenger capacity, the largest of any conventional-type school bus in North America. In addition to traditional diesel-fuel engines, the C2 has been offered with multiple fuel options, along with both hybrid and fully electric powertrains.

Thomas manufactures the C2 in a dedicated facility in High Point, North Carolina, United States while the chassis is built in Gaffney, South Carolina.

== Background ==
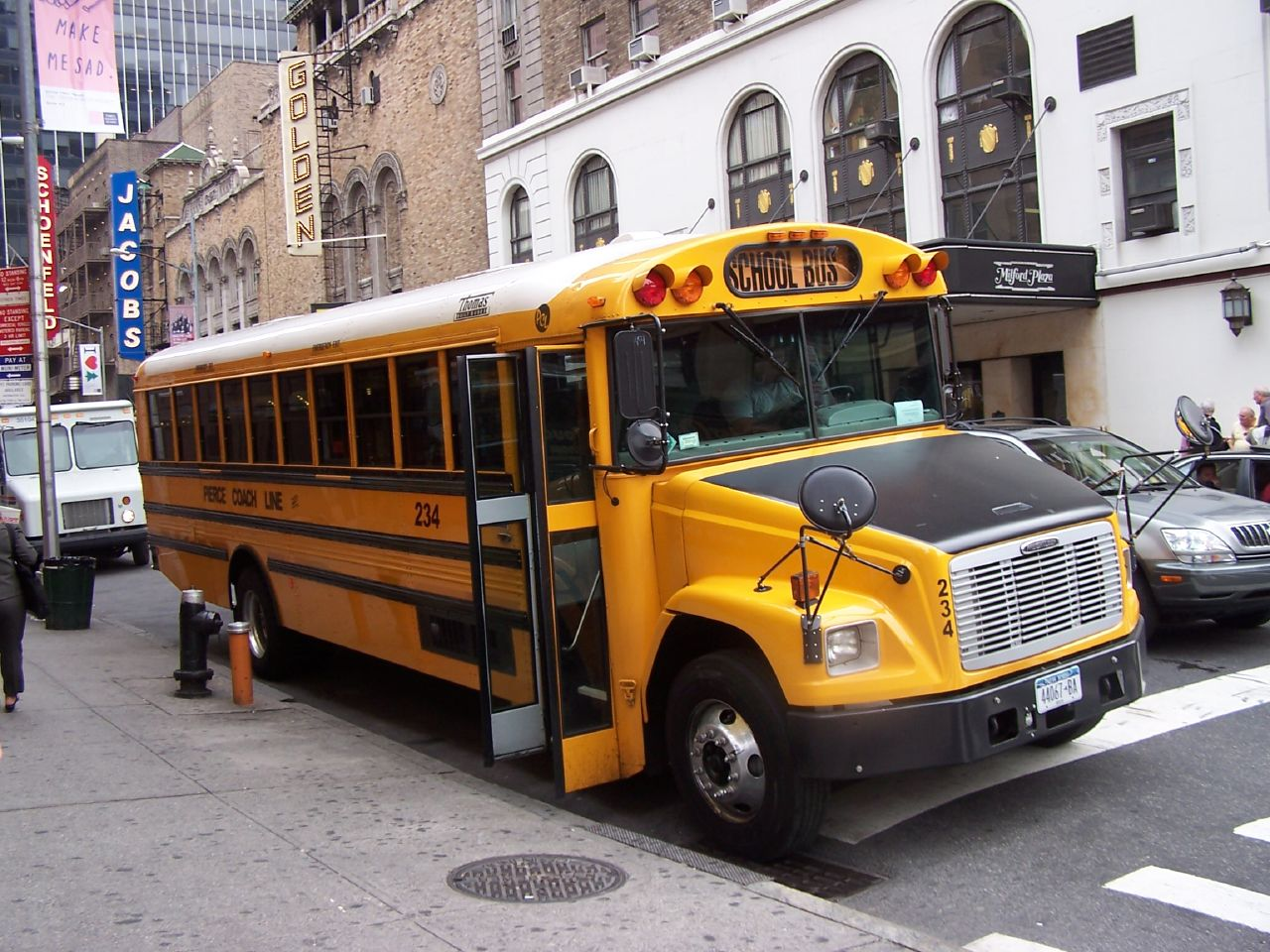
Thomas Saf-T-Liner FS-65, predecessor of the Saf-T-Liner C2

Following the acquisition of Thomas Built Buses by Freightliner in late 1998, the company began work on the Saf-T-Liner C2 in 1999 as the successor for the long-running Saf-T-Liner Conventional (which had last undergone a complete redesign in 1962). As the company began to increase its usage of the Freightliner FS-65 chassis, the C2 was developed in tandem with its successor: the Freightliner Business Class M2 (developed outside of the influence of Mercedes-Benz). During the design of the C2, Thomas sought input from all types of potential users, including drivers, mechanics, and transportation directors.

After company approval of the C2 design in 2000, Thomas built a second facility in its hometown of High Point, North Carolina dedicated entirely to assembly of the model line. The 275,000 square foot facility was fitted with a ¾-mile long automatic conveyer with robotic-assisted workstations. In November 2003, Thomas introduced the Saf-T-Liner C2 at an industry conference.

In June 2004, assembly of the model line commenced in the new facility, with the first vehicle delivered in November 2004 to Durham School Services. Thomas continued to produce the Saf-T-Liner FS-65 through the end of 2006, with its chassis variant outliving the rest of the medium-duty FL-Series by nearly three years.

In October 2012, Thomas delivered its 50,000th Saf-T-Liner C2 to Dean Transportation of Lansing, Michigan. In 2016, Thomas Built Buses released the 100th Anniversary model of the C2. In June 2018, the 100,000th Thomas Saf-T-Liner C2 was delivered to Montgomery County Public Schools in Virginia.

== Overview ==
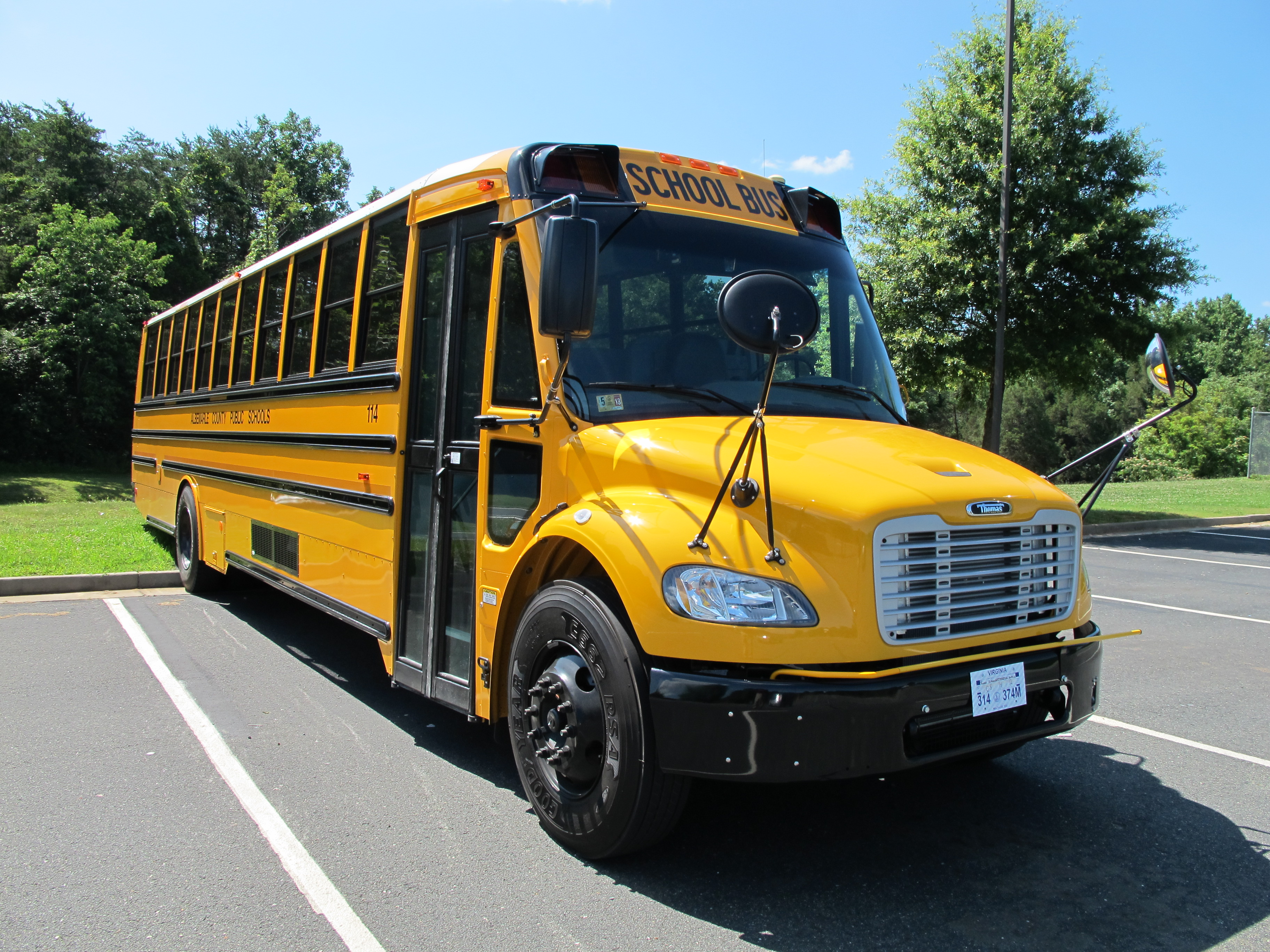
2013 Thomas Saf-T-Liner C2 in Virginia

=== Design and manufacture ===
As the Thomas Saf-T-Liner C2 marked the first completely new bus body for the company since 1962, Thomas redesigned a number of its manufacturing techniques coinciding with its introduction.

To minimize the number of rivets and welds (a weak point of structural integrity on a bus body), adhesive bonding was used to complete a number of body joints. In the cases where fasteners are needed, self-piercing rivets are used. These engineered fasteners join layers of metal together without punching completely through the bottom layer, thus reducing the likelihood that rivets will become the source of leaks in the future.

=== Chassis ===
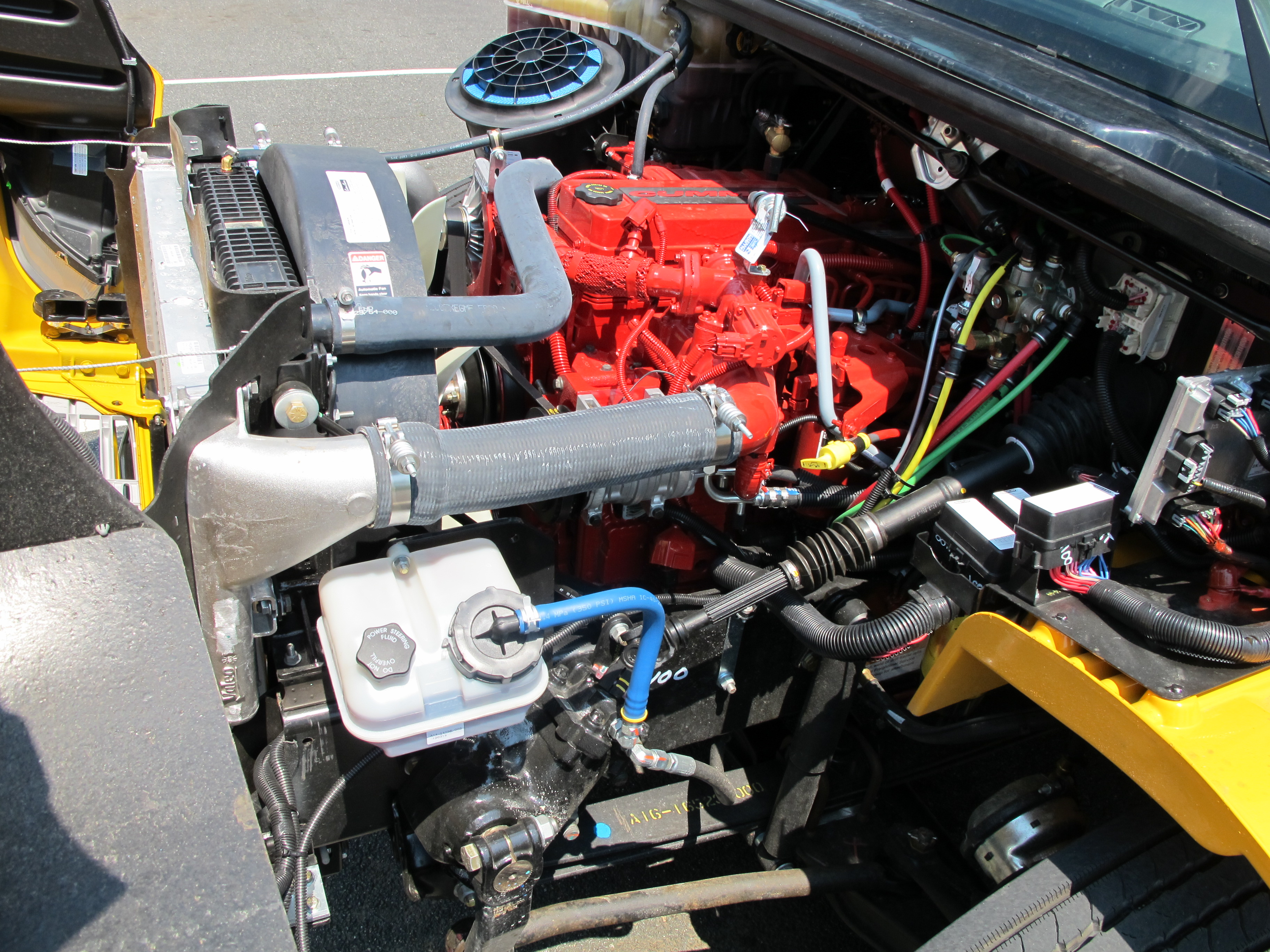
Cummins ISB6.7 in a Saf-T-Liner C2

As with all conventional-style school buses, the C2 is derived from a cowled-chassis conventional; the C2 uses the Freightliner C2 variant of the M2. As with 2000s and 2010s industry practice in school bus manufacturing, chassis and body manufacturers are paired, with Freightliner and Thomas developing the C2 as an integrated vehicle (the Freightliner grille badges are replaced with Thomas badges).

At its launch, Mercedes-Benz MBE diesel engines were the standard engines, with optional Caterpillar C7 and Cummins ISB diesels. In 2008, the Cummins ISB6.7 replaced the MBE900 as the standard engine, with the C7 discontinued. From 2010 to 2018, the sole diesel engine in the Thomas C2 was the Cummins ISB6.7; for 2018 production, the Detroit Diesel DD5 becomes an option.

The C2 comes standard with an Allison 2500 automatic transmission with an Allison 3000 automatic transmission as an option. The Saf-T-Liner C2 is the only school bus in North America offered with a manual transmission; a rarely ordered option is a Fuller 6-speed transmission.

Engine	Production	Configuration	Fuel	Notes	Transmission
Caterpillar C7	2004–2008	7.2 L (441 cu in) turbo I6	diesel	optional engine	Allison 2500 automatic Allison 3000 automatic Fuller 6-speed manual
Cummins ISB6.7	2008–2017	6.7 L (408 cu in) turbo I6	diesel CNG available 2009–present; produced with diesel-electric powertrain from 2009 to 2013		Allison 2500 automatic Allison 3000 automatic Fuller 6-speed manual
Cummins B6.7	2017–present	6.7 L (408 cu in) turbo I6			Allison 2500 automatic Allison 3000 automatic Fuller 6-speed manual
Detroit Diesel DD5	2018–present	5.1 L (313 cu in) turbo I4	diesel	optional engine	Allison 2500 automatic Allison 3000 automatic Fuller 6-speed manual
Mercedes-Benz MBE900 (OM904LA)	2004–2009	4.2 L (259 cu in) turbo I4 (MBE904)	diesel	standard engine at launch	Allison 2500 automatic Allison 3000 automatic Fuller 6-speed manual
Mercedes-Benz MBE900 (OM904LA)	2004–2009	4.8 L (293 cu in) turbo I4 (MBE924)	diesel	standard engine at launch	Allison 2500 automatic Allison 3000 automatic Fuller 6-speed manual
Mercedes-Benz MBE900 (OM904LA)	2004–2009	6.4 L (388 cu in) turbo I6 (MBE906)	diesel	standard engine at launch	Allison 2500 automatic Allison 3000 automatic Fuller 6-speed manual
Mercedes-Benz MBE900 (OM904LA)	2004–2009	7.2 L (438 cu in) turbo I6 (MBE926)	diesel	standard engine at launch	Allison 2500 automatic Allison 3000 automatic Fuller 6-speed manual
Powertrain Integration PIthon	2014–2022	8.0 L (487 cu in) OHV V8	propane/LPG Gasoline		Allison 2500 automatic Allison 3000 automatic Fuller 6-speed manual
Power Solutions International DriveForce	2019–2022	8.8 L (535 cu in) OHV V8	propane/LPG Gasoline		Allison 2500 automatic Allison 3000 automatic Fuller 6-speed manual
Proterra ProDrive	2019–present	Permanent magnet motor	battery electric	Thomas C2 Jouley	Proterra 2-speed automatic

=== Body ===
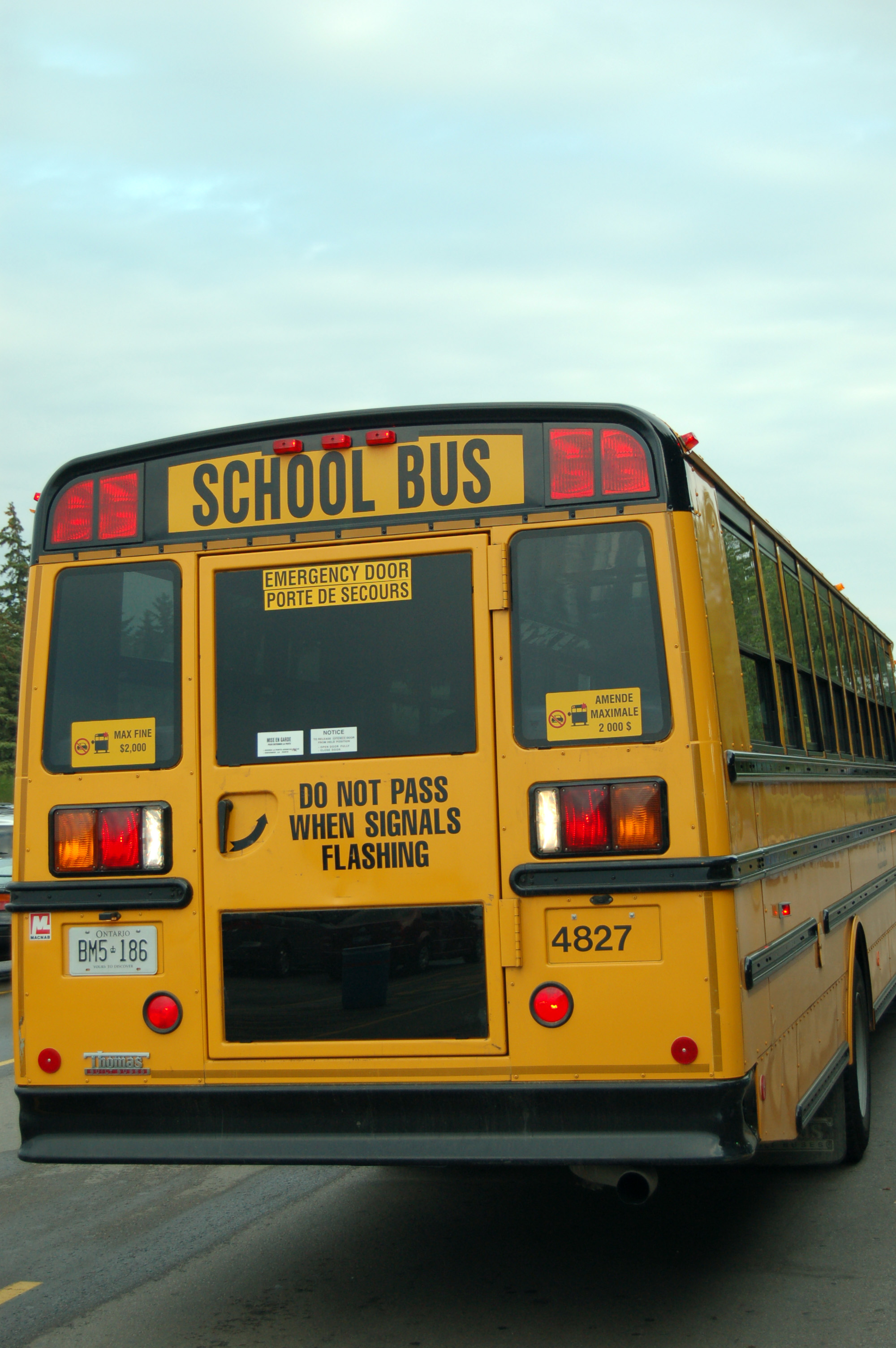
Rear view, Thomas Saf-T-Liner C2 (2007)

In a break from traditional bus body design, as body manufacturers acted as second stage manufacturers adapting the body to the chassis, in the design of the C2, Freightliner-owned Thomas Built Buses designed the body and chassis of Saf-T-Liner C2 as fully integrated components. A separate body from the Saf-T-Liner EFX/HDX and Minotour, the C2 body shares no parts with its Saf-T-Liner Conventional/FS-65 predecessor.

While Freightliner has also produced cutaway-cab buses derived from the M2 for commercial/transit use, Thomas Built Buses is the only manufacturer to produce a cowled-chassis bus body derived from the M2. Coinciding with the shift to the Freightliner M2 cowl, several changes were made to improve the functionality over its predecessor. Most visibly, to improve aerodynamics, the traditional multipane vertical windshield was replaced by a sloped single-piece curved piece of glass (allowing the use of the stock windshield wipers). Above the windshield, the front bodywork matches the windshield slope; to further improve aerodynamics, the warning lamp lenses are faired into the body (where allowed by regulations).

On the rear of the C2, the body also used flush-mounted glass and warning-lamp lenses. While not substantially physically taller than its predecessor, Thomas visually extended the height of the C2 with larger passenger windows than previous school buses, along with larger exit doors.

On the exterior, the C2 has largely remained the same throughout its production run. In late 2007, the passenger windows saw a minor change, with a shift to equal-size window sashes (previously, the top half was larger). In the rear, the taillights were redesigned and enlarged, later becoming a standard design for all Thomas buses. To improve driver sightlines, the mirror bracket for the passenger-side rear-view mirrors was extended forward.

In the interior of the C2, Thomas made many advancements in an effort to maximize parts compatibility between the bus body and donor chassis. In previous conventional-style school buses, from the firewall rearward, only the steering column and instrument cluster were used. With the interior of the Thomas C2, the dashboard of Freightliner M2 is used in its entirety, adopting only minor changes (the ignition switch was required to move to the center of the dashboard, due to a driver control panel replacing the driver-side door).

Along with the optimization of aerodynamics, the body of the Thomas C2 also optimized driver visibility. Following the redesign of the windshield, the entry door was repositioned, creating a large window between the entry door and windshield to view sightlines in the loading zone (a feature adopted from the Thomas Vista and nearly all small school buses); a smaller quarter window was located forward of the driver's sliding window. In comparison to other Thomas buses, the C2 has enlarged passenger windows and larger emergency exits.

While initially equipped with an air-operated entry door, in 2012, an electric-operated entry door became offered as an option. Since 2016, a manually operated passenger entry door was added as an option.

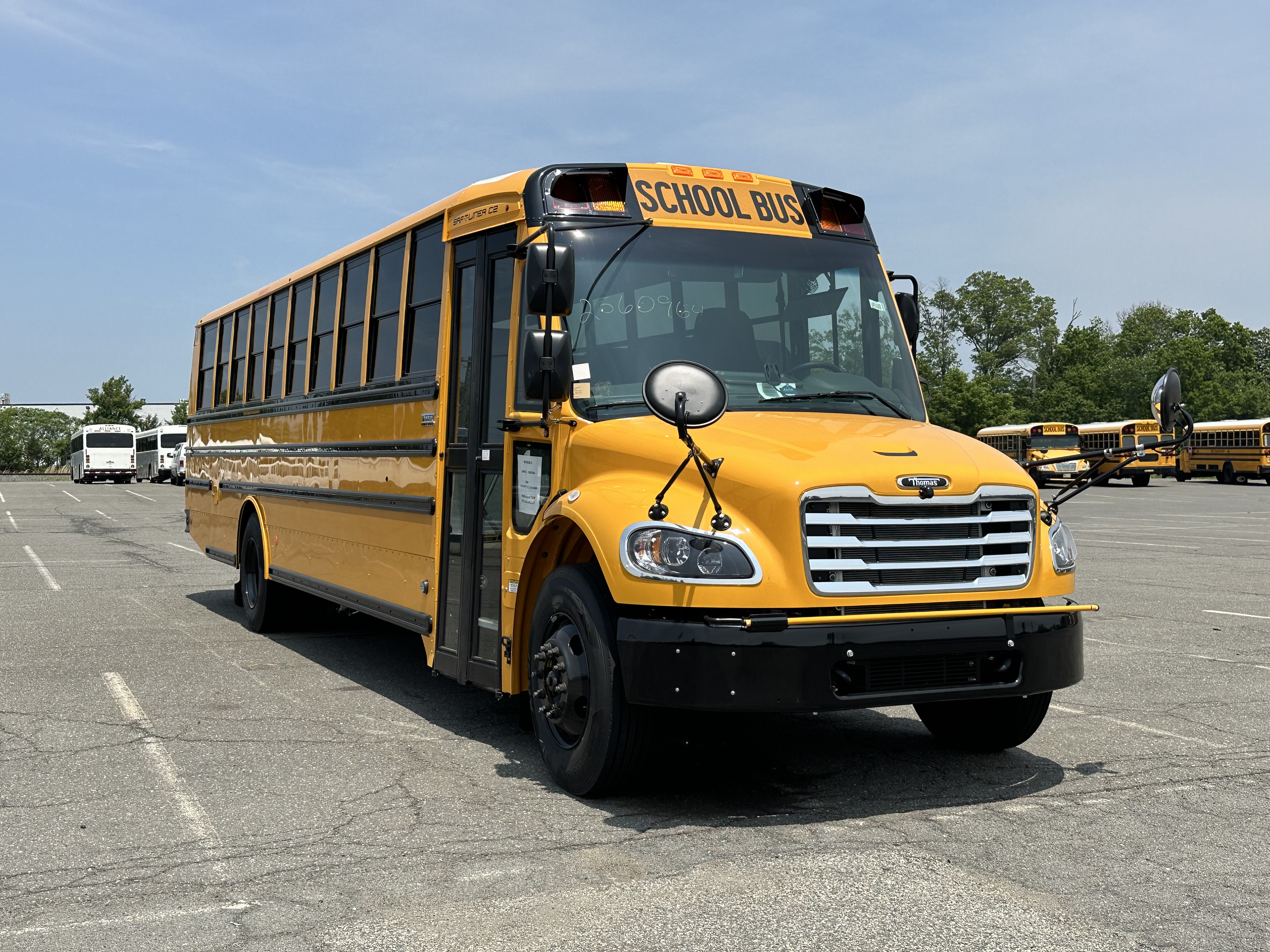
2026 Thomas C2 Evolved

At the end of 2023, Thomas debuted the Saf-T-Liner C2 Evolved for 2025 production, marking the first major update to the C2 in over 15 years. While the underlying body structure saw few changes, the C2 Evolved followed suit with the updates of the Freightliner M2 Plus. Along with a digital dashboard and a stalk-operated transmission shifter, the update saw a modernization of the electrical system (allowing for better integration of future technology). Externally, the C2 Evolved adopted the slatted grille style of the M2 Plus (in line with the larger Freightliner Cascadia).

== Variants ==
=== Alternative fuel powertrains ===
In May 2014, Thomas Built Buses began production of a propane-fueled version of the Saf-T-Liner C2. Powered by a 339 hp 8.0L V8, the C2 Propane is paired with the Allison 2300PTS automatic transmission. The engine is designed by Powertrain Integration (an OEM supplier to General Motors) with the 8.0L V8 named the PIthon. In 2019, the propane engine was enlarged to a DriveForce-branded 8.8 L, supplied by Power Solutions International, which had acquired Powertrain Integration in 2015.

In 2016, a compressed natural gas (CNG) variant of the Saf-T-Liner C2 was released. The first Type C (conventional-style) school bus produced with a CNG fuel system, the Saf-T-Liner C2 CNG is powered by a version of the Cummins ISB 6.7 engine.

=== C2e (hybrid-electric bus) ===
In 2007, Thomas introduced a hybrid-electric version of the Saf-T-Liner, named the C2e (stylized as C2^{e}). The parallel hybrid drivetrain was designed by Eaton Corporation; the C2e retains the Cummins ISB engine and adds a 1.9 kW-hr lithium-ion battery pack with a 44 kW electric motor/generator. Annual fuel savings were estimated to range from 300 to 450 US gal (1,100 to 1,700 L) assuming 10,000 miles (16,000 km) per year. This is a 20% increase in fuel economy, and the buses can drive under battery propulsion for up to 15 miles (24 km). At least 24 C2e buses were built and delivered to operators in Kentucky and Michigan. In the summer of 2013, Thomas removed the C2e product literature from their website, marking its discontinuation.

=== C2 Jouley (electric bus) ===
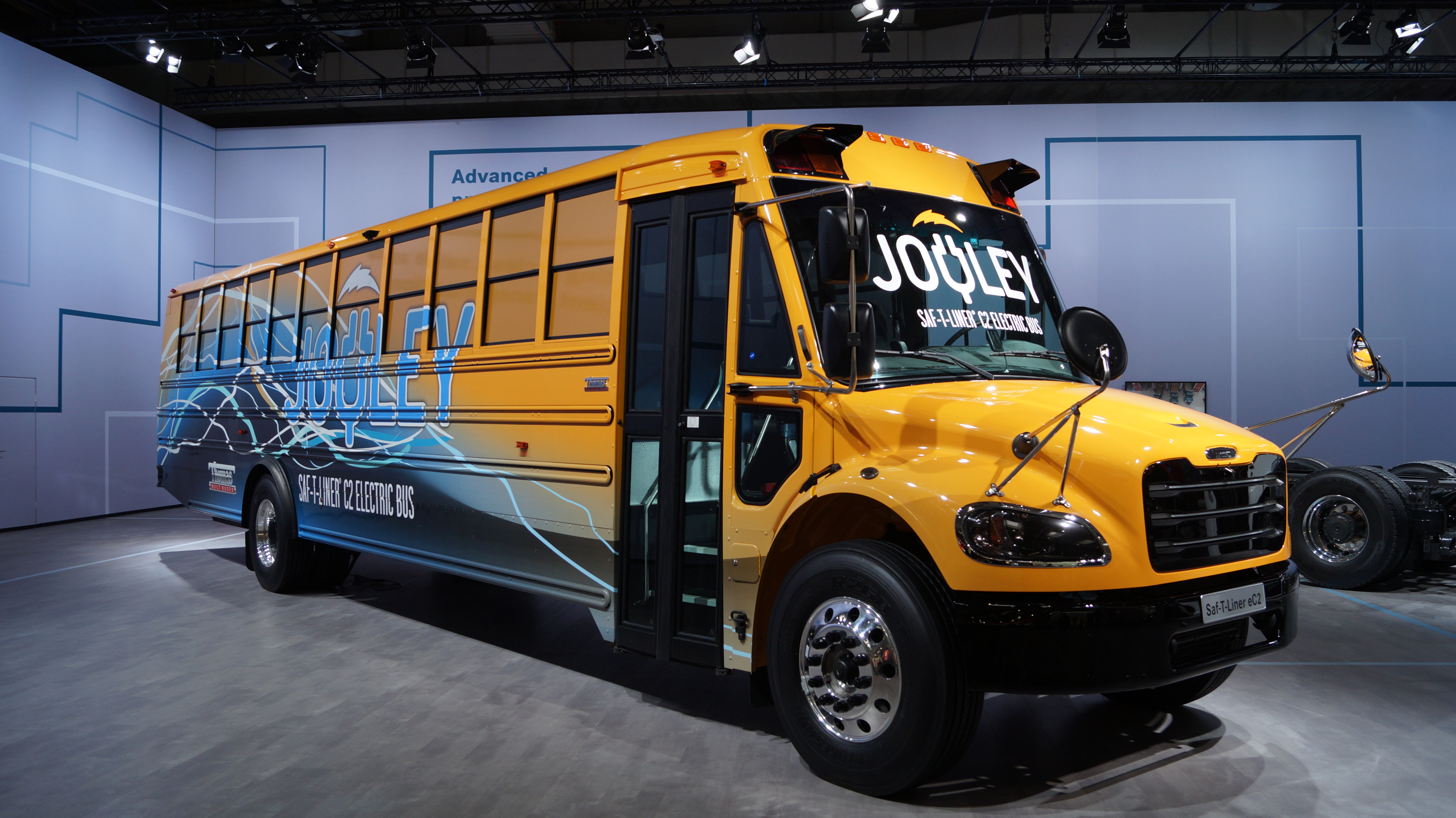
2018 "Jouley" prototype, electric-powered Thomas Saf-T-Liner C2 school bus

In November 2018, Thomas unveiled a battery-powered prototype of the Thomas Saf-T-Liner C2 designated eC2 or "Jouley" (after the unit of energy). The prototype previews an all-electric C2 intended for production during 2019; it was developed in partnership with Proterra, Inc., who offer a line of transit buses using the same battery-electric drivetrain. The C2 Jouley uses a single traction motor with an output of 295 / 170 hp (220 / 127 kW) (peak/continuous) and a two-speed gearbox; this configuration is branded ProDrive by Proterra. The traction battery has a total capacity of 220 kW-hr, providing a range of up to 135 miles (217 km), assuming an efficiency of 1.4 kW-hr/mile (24.6 mpg_{‑US} (9.6 L/100 km) equivalent). The bus is charged using the SAE J1772 CCS Combo 1 connector; a full charge takes approximately 3 hours using a 60 kW DC charger.

The first large order for 50 Jouley buses was placed by Dominion Energy in December 2019 as the first phase of their school bus replacement program, to be delivered by the end of 2020. In February 2021, the Montgomery County Public Schools (Maryland), largest school district in the state, announced they had ordered 326 Jouley buses. On October 17, 2022, Thomas delivered the 200th Saf-T-Liner C2 Jouley to Indiana-based Monroe County Public Schools.

=== Other uses ===
Alongside its yellow school bus configuration, Thomas Built Buses produces multiple configurations of the Saf-T-Liner C2, including MFSAB versions (activity/childcare versions), along with the Transit Liner C2 commercial-use bus. Through aftermarket manufacturers, the C2 also serves as a donor vehicle for multiple types of specialty vehicles derived from bus bodies.

== Comparable products ==
- Blue Bird Vision
- IC Bus CE Series

== See also ==
- Freightliner C2—The bus chassis used for the Saf-T-Liner C2.
