= Freightliner Business Class M2 =

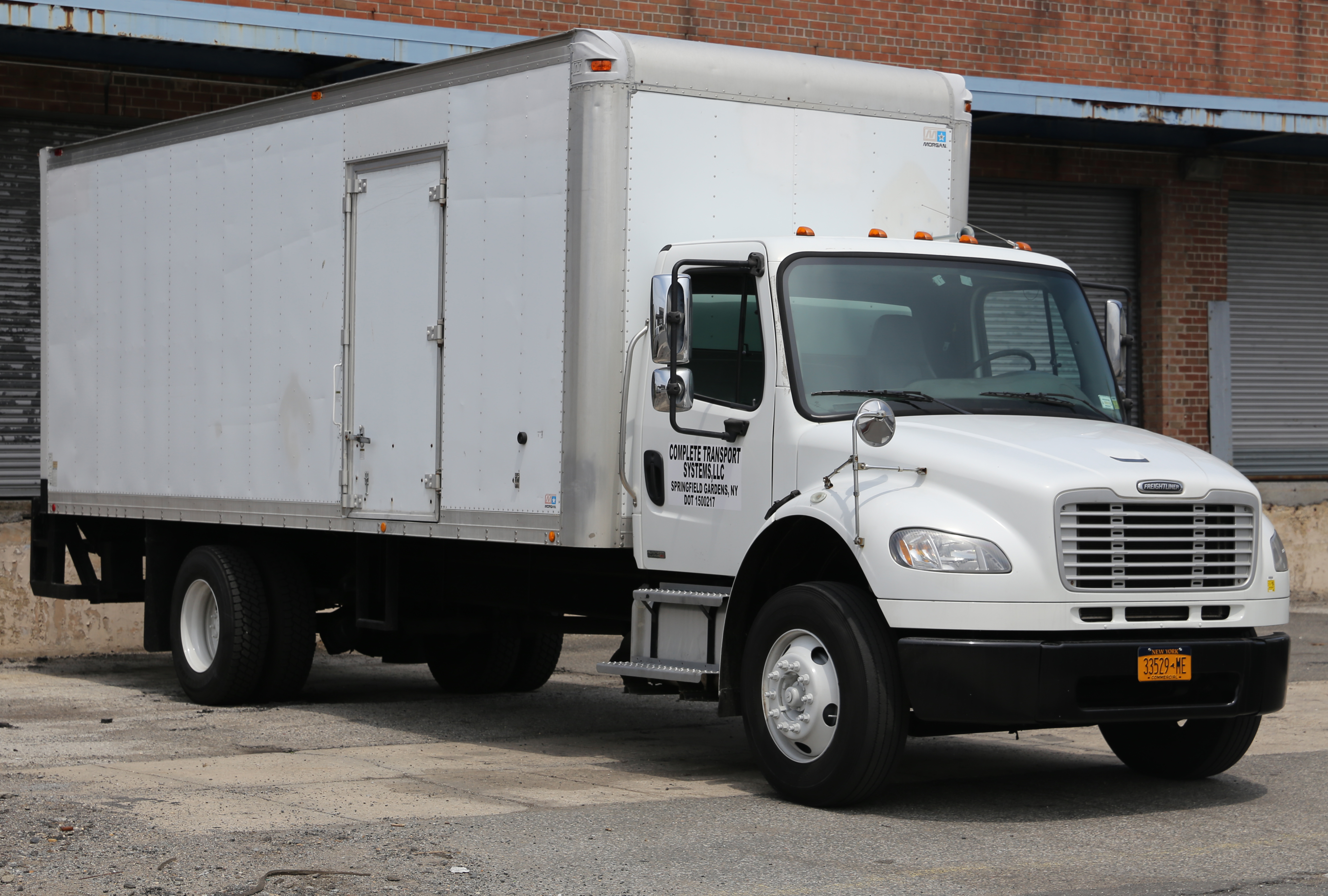
- Freightliner M2 106 straight truck with a van body

Overview
- Type: Straight truck Semitractor (M2 112)
- Manufacturer: Daimler Trucks North America (Freightliner)
- Also called: Freightliner M2
- Production: June 2002 – present
- Model years: 2003-2023 (M2); 2024-present (M2 Plus)
- Assembly: Mount Holly, North Carolina; Santiago Tianguistenco, Mexico

Body and chassis
- Class: Class 5-8
- Body style: 2-door daycab; 2-door extended cab; 4-door crewcab
- Layout: 4x2; 6x4; 4x4; 6x6
- Related: Freightliner C2 (bus chassis); Freightliner 108SD; Freightliner 114SD

Powertrain
- Engine: Caterpillar 3126/C7 I6 (discontinued); Cummins ISB5.9 I6 (discontinued); Cummins ISB6.7 I6 (discontinued); Cummins B6.7 I6 2017–present; Cummins ISL-L9 I6 Hybrid 1999–present Only; Cummins ISC I6 (discontinued); Cummins ISL I6; Cummins ISL-G I6; Detroit Diesel DD13 I6 (M2 112 only); Detroit Diesel DD5 I4 M2 106 ONLY; Mercedes-Benz MBE900 I4 (discontinued); Mercedes-Benz MBE900 I6 (discontinued)

Chronology
- Predecessor: Freightliner FL-Series

The Freightliner Business Class M2 (typically shortened to M2) is a model range of medium-duty trucks produced by Freightliner since the 2003 model year. The first generation of the Business Class developed entirely by Freightliner, the M2 replaced the FL-Series introduced in 1991. Serving as a Class 5-Class 8 product range, the model line is the smallest conventional-cab Freightliner truck, slotted between its Sprinter vans and Cascadia highway tractors.

Distinguished by its jellybean-shaped headlamps, large windshield, and nearly vertical grille, the M2 is designed for a wide variety of applications, encompassing multiple design configurations. In addition to cargo box trucks, flatbed trucks, and towing vehicles, the model family supports a wide variety of emergency, utility, and vocational uses, with multiple cab, chassis, and axle configurations. The model line is also manufactured by Freightliner for bus applications, with both cowled-chassis and cutaway-cab configurations supporting body assemblies.

Since June 2002, Freightliner has assembled the M2 in its Mount Holly, North Carolina facility. Since 2003, the company has assembled the model line in Santiago Tianguistenco, Mexico for Latin American sale. In late 2023, the second generation of the M2 (known as the M2 Plus) entered production.

== First generation (M2, 2003–2023) ==
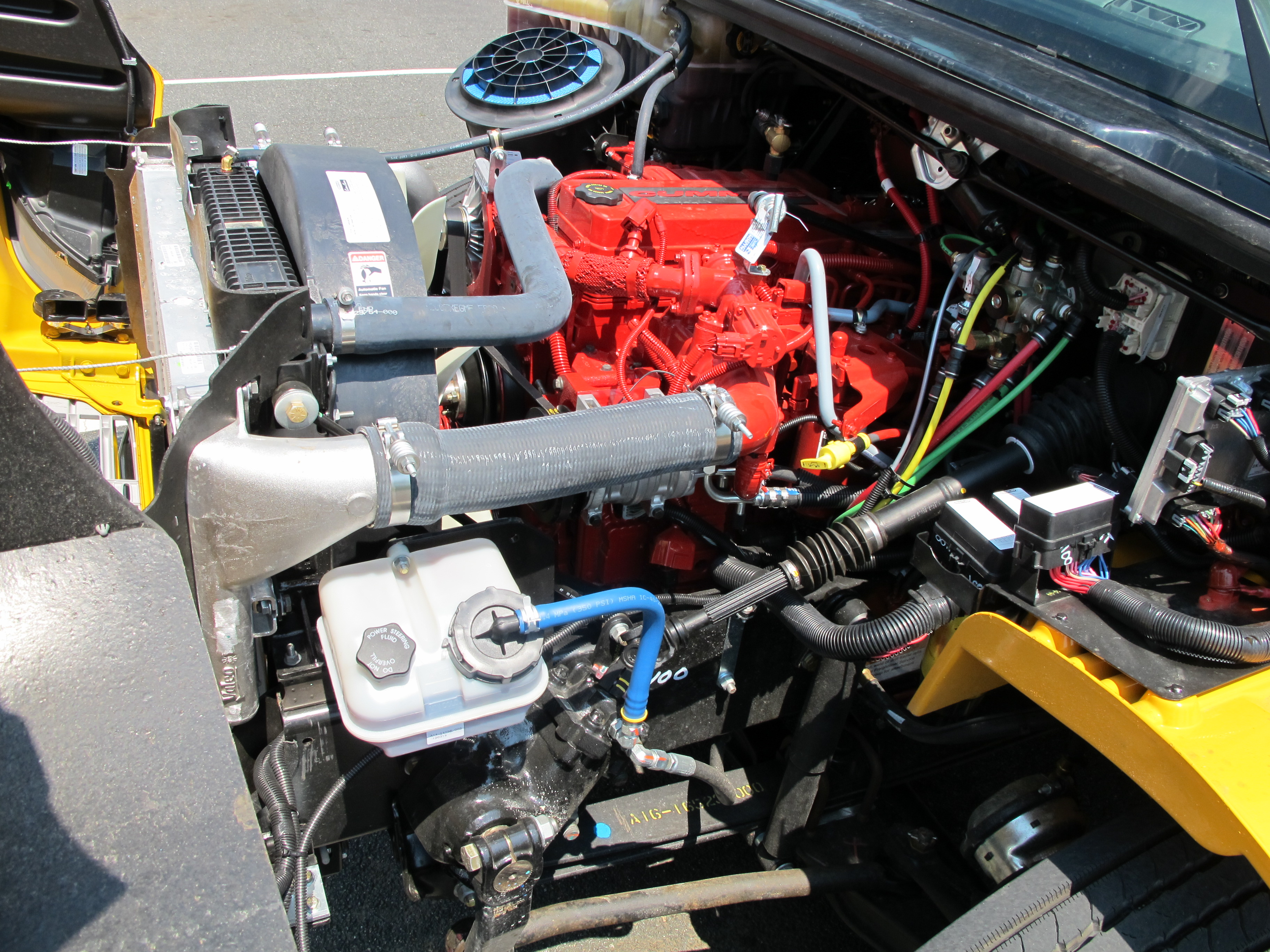
Engine compartment, showing a Cummins ISB6.7

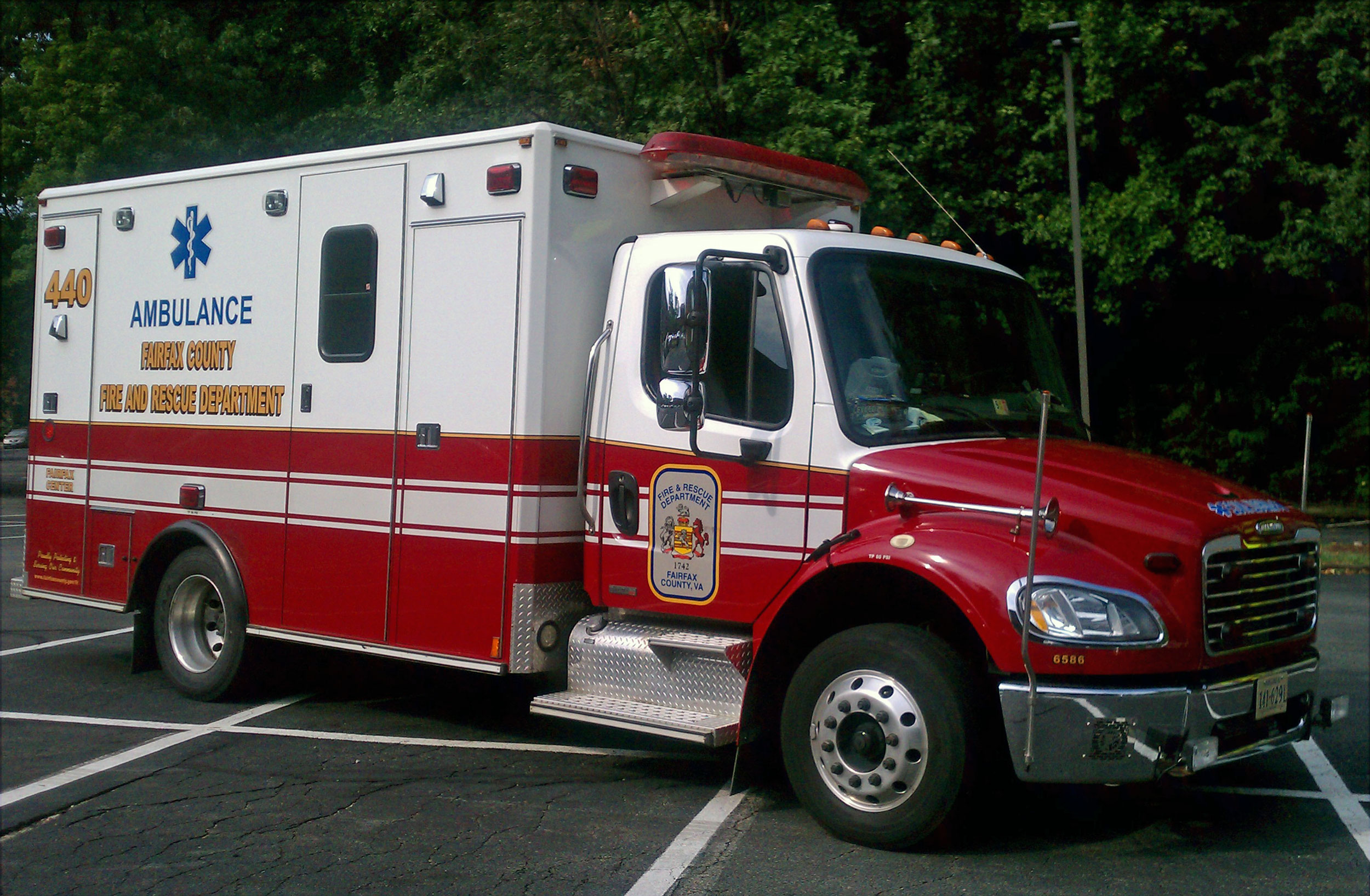
Freightliner M2 106 ambulance

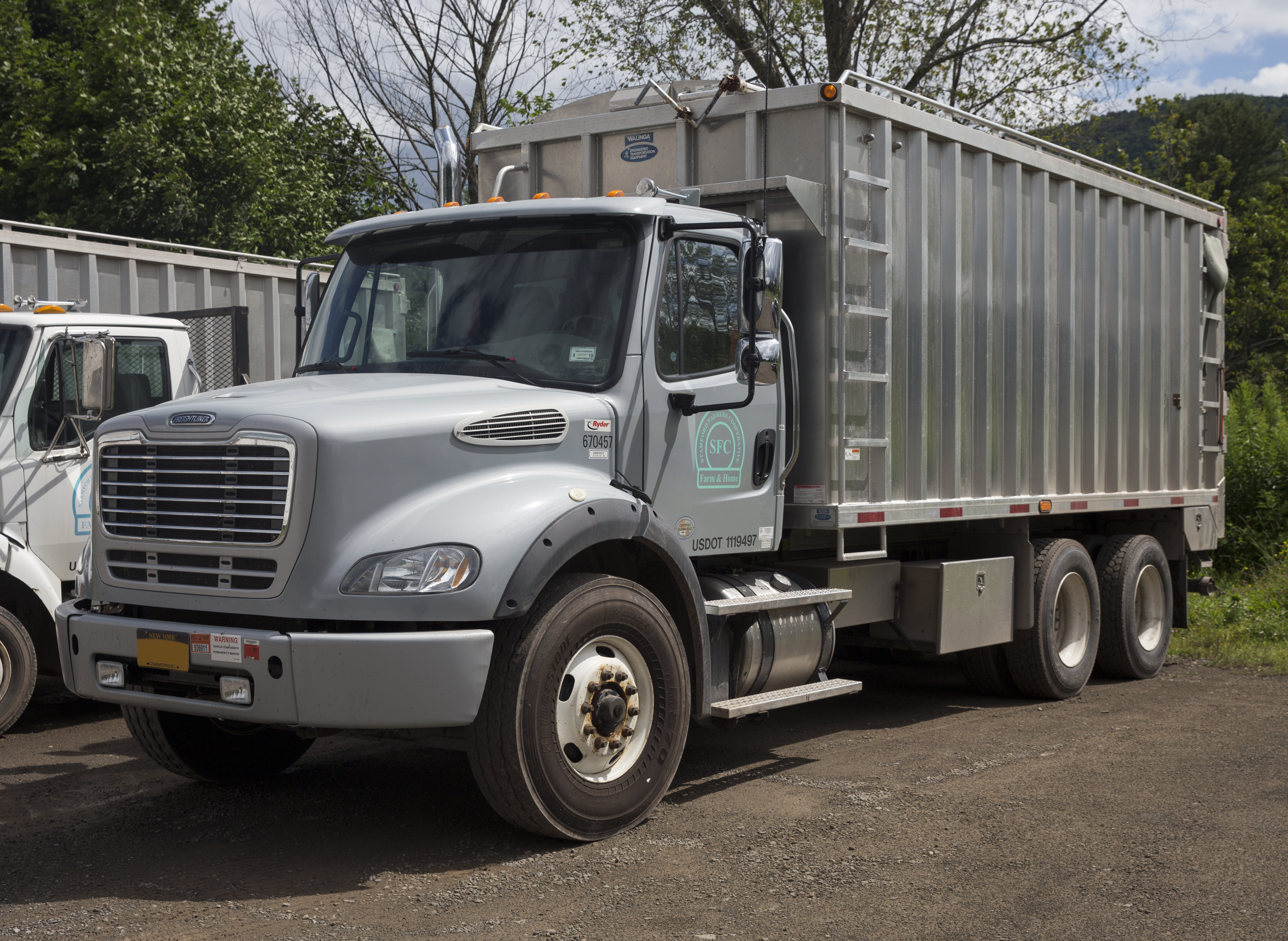
Freightliner M2 112

Following a $250 million development program by Freightliner, the Business Class M2 was introduced at the beginning of 2002; starting with 2003 production, the all-new model line was gradually phased in as a replacement of the previous FL-Series. To produce the all-new model line, the Mount Holly, North Carolina manufacturing facility underwent extensive renovations, upgrading its assembly systems with increased automation; expansion also allowed for increased production.

In contrast to the FL-Series, which adopted a Mercedes-Benz low-cab COE to a conventional-cab configuration, the M2 was developed within North America. Replacing the Class 5-8 FL50-80 was the M2 106 (denoted by its 106-inch BBC length). During 2003, Freightliner introduced the Class 5 M2 100 (the smallest M2) and the M2 112 (replacing the FL112). For all three models, three cab configurations were offered: a standard daycab, a two-door extended cab, and a four-door crew cab. While the 100 and 106 were produced largely as straight trucks, the 112 was produced both as a straight truck and as a semitractor.

Coinciding with the development of the M2, Daimler Trucks North America made multiple changes to other truck lines produced by the company. The Sterling line of trucks adopted a number of components from the M2 (reducing the share of parts originally designed by Ford, the original developer). Freightliner Custom Chassis (the namesake subsidiary producing bus and RV chassis) also began development of vehicles derived from the M2.

=== Powertrain details ===
The M2 100 and 106 were initially equipped with standard Mercedes-Benz MBE900 diesel engines, with the M2 106 offering Caterpillar engines as an option. The M2 112 was fitted with larger engines, using the MBE4000 as standard (with larger engines distinguished by a taller grille and a flatter hood). Following the exit of both Caterpillar and Mercedes-Benz from on-highway diesel production in North America, the model line sourced its engines exclusively from Cummins. For 2017, the M2 106 introduced the Detroit DD5 inline-4 turbodiesel as a standard engine (a design derived from the Mercedes-Benz OM936).

=== Alternative-fuel vehicles ===
In 2006, Freightliner produced its first prototype of a diesel-electric parallel hybrid vehicle, using a M2 106 powered by a Mercedes MBE906 diesel and an electric motor integrated within the drivetrain. The system was intended to move from a stop on electric power, with the diesel engine providing only supplemental torque. The parallel-hybrid configuration entered production in 2008, with Freightliner targeting customers driving in urban environments. In 2011, the 1000th M2 hybrid was produced.

In 2009, Freightliner introduced the M2 112 NG powered by compressed natural gas (CNG). The first CNG-fuel vehicle produced by the company, the 112NG used a Cummins ISL-G inline-6.

In 2018, Freightliner introduced the eM2, a prototype of a Class 5 box truck. Developed for local use, the eM2 has a range of 230 miles. Following field testing of limited-production vehicles by customers, the eM2 entered full-scale production in 2023 as a variant of the second-generation M2 Plus. Two versions are offered: a single-motor Class 6 truck (180 miles of range) and a dual-motor Class 7 truck (250 miles of range). The motor(s) are integrated into the axle (including a two-speed transmission), with the battery placed below the cab.

== Second generation (M2 Plus, 2024–present) ==
Introduced in late 2022 for 2024 production, the second-generation M2 Plus marks the most extensive changes to the model line since its 2002 introduction. Visibly similar to the first generation, the Plus series is distinguished by its projector headlamps, an enlarged hood vent, and a restyled grille (replacing its Century Class-style design with the slatted style of the facelifted Cascadia).

Though sharing the cab structure of the previous generation, the interior of the M2 Plus was completely redesigned, centered on upgrading both ergonomics and user technology. An all-new dashboard integrated functions into the steering wheel, increased the customization capability (for auxiliary switches), and a largely digital instrument panel. The model line adopted a number of safety systems, standardizing active brake assistance and lane departure warnings; side guard assistance and adaptive cruise control are optional.

== Variants ==
=== Heavy-duty trucks ===
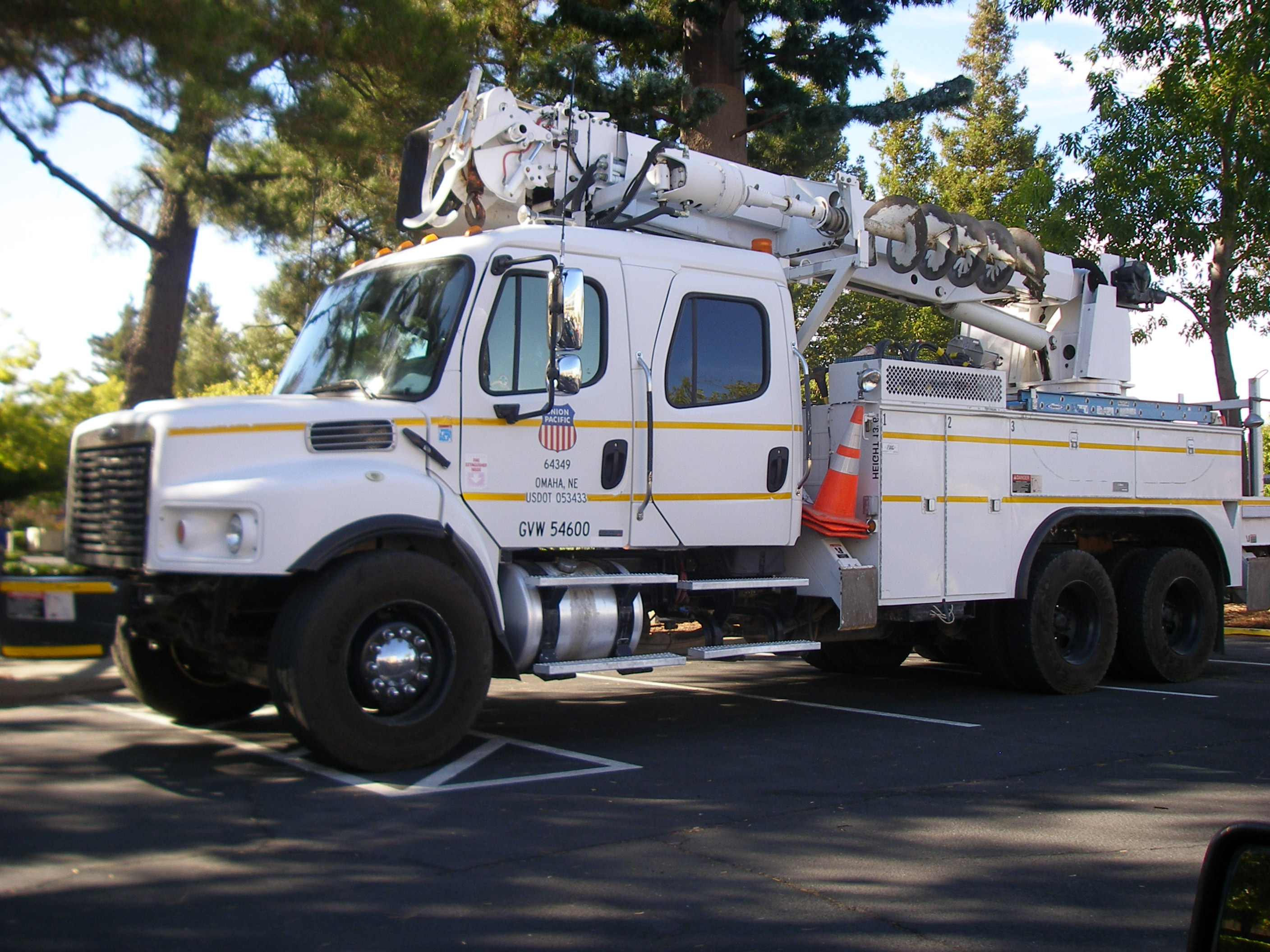
Freightliner M2 106V crew-cab railroad maintenance vehicle

==== M2 106V/112V ====
In 2004, Freightliner released the M2 106V and M2 112V (V=Vocational) heavy-duty variants of the M2 model family. Intended for applications where the vehicle powers auxiliary components, the 112V is equipped with a power take-off device (PTO), optional on the 106V. Both vehicles are designed with heavier-duty frame and suspension components and offer extended front frame rails (to package a PTO, or to fit equipment such as a snowplow). Distinguished by their rectangular hood air intake, the 106V was fitted with a higher-profile hood and rectangular grille (the 112V was typically identified by its rectangular air intake).

==== 108SD/114SD ====
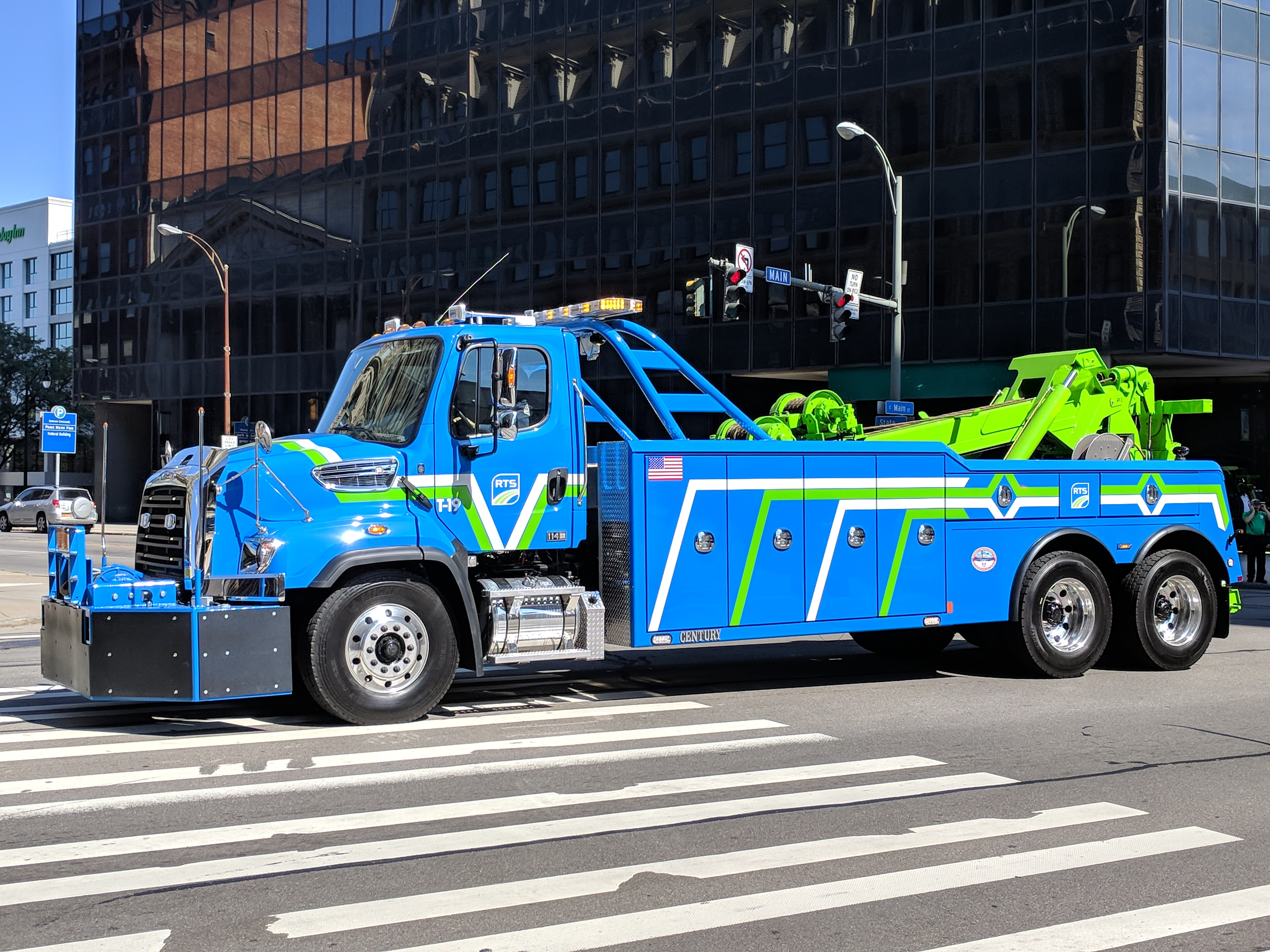
2018 Freightliner 114SD tow truck

For 2012 production, the M2 106V and 112V were replaced by the SD-series (SD=Severe Duty), including the Class 7 108SD (set-back front axle) and the Class 8 114SD (set-forward/set-back front axle). Along with replacing similar models within the previous FL-Series, the SD series was also introduced to replace market share lost by the 2009 closure of Sterling. The model line adopted the cab structure of the M2 (reinforced by steel), placing it on the chassis of the 122SD (the renamed Freightliner Coronado). In contrast to both the M2 and the 122SD, the 108SD and 114SD were developed entirely for vocational applications.

Alongside the M2 Plus, the SD followed a similar redesign, becoming the SD Plus for 2024.

=== Bus ===
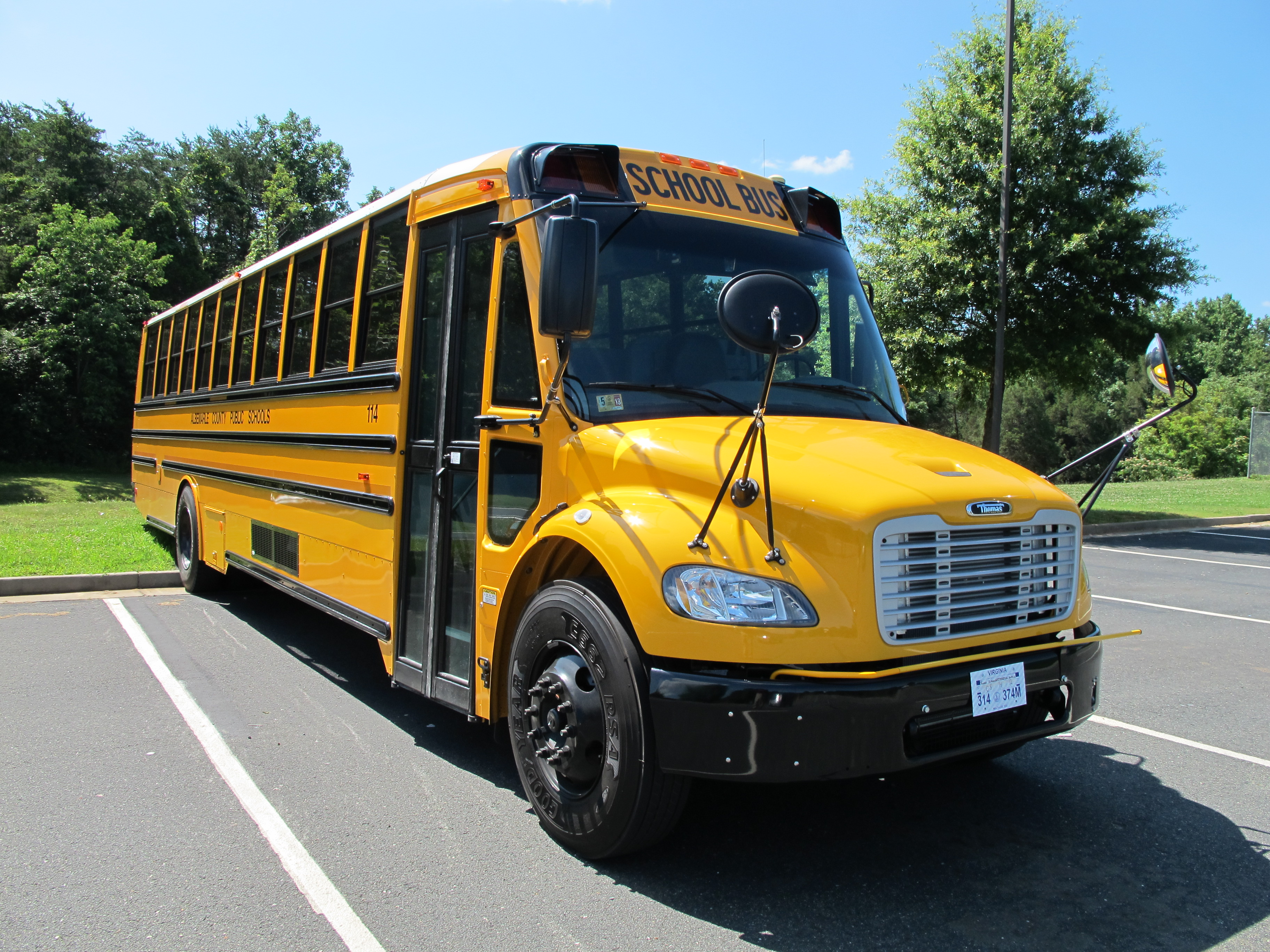
Thomas Saf-T-Liner C2 school bus

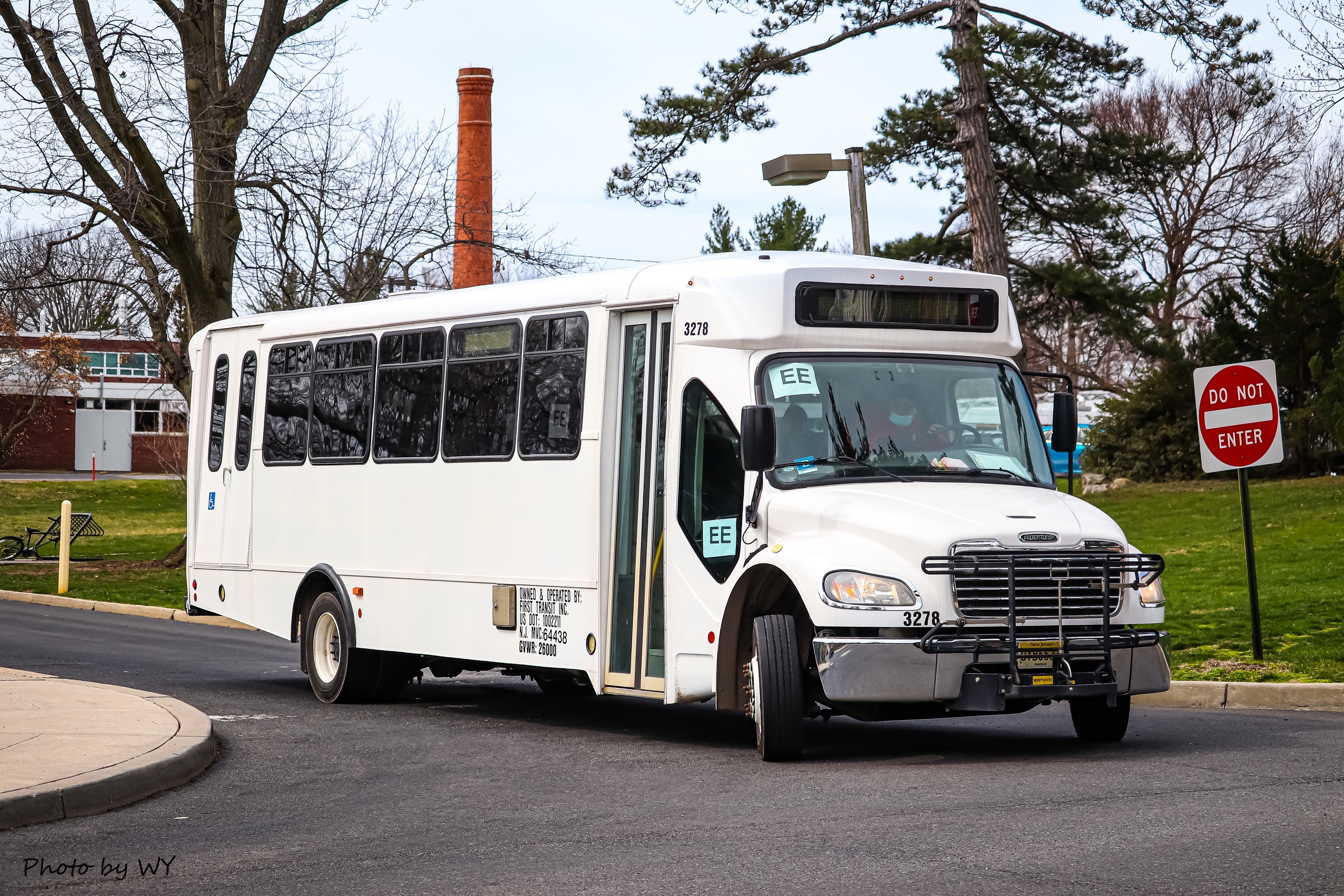
Freightliner M2 106 cutaway cab bus

For bus applications, Freightliner has developed two variants of the M2. The C2 is a cowled chassis (bodied without a cab); for applications outside of school bus use, Freightliner designates the cowled bus chassis as the S2.

Developed specifically for the Thomas Saf-T-Liner C2 school bus (assembled by Freightliner subsidiary Thomas Built Buses), the C2 departs from previous precedent in its higher parts commonality with its donor chassis. From the driver's seat forward, the dashboard is used in its entirety; though a revised windshield is used, the stock windshield wipers are retained.

The Freightliner S2C (S2 Cutaway) is a cutaway-cab variant of the M2 106. Intended for commercial use (including shuttle and transit bus use), the S2C has not been produced with a yellow school bus body. A variant of the S2C cab chassis known as the S2RV is also used as a platform for large Type C recreational vehicles (RVs).

=== Aftermarket ===
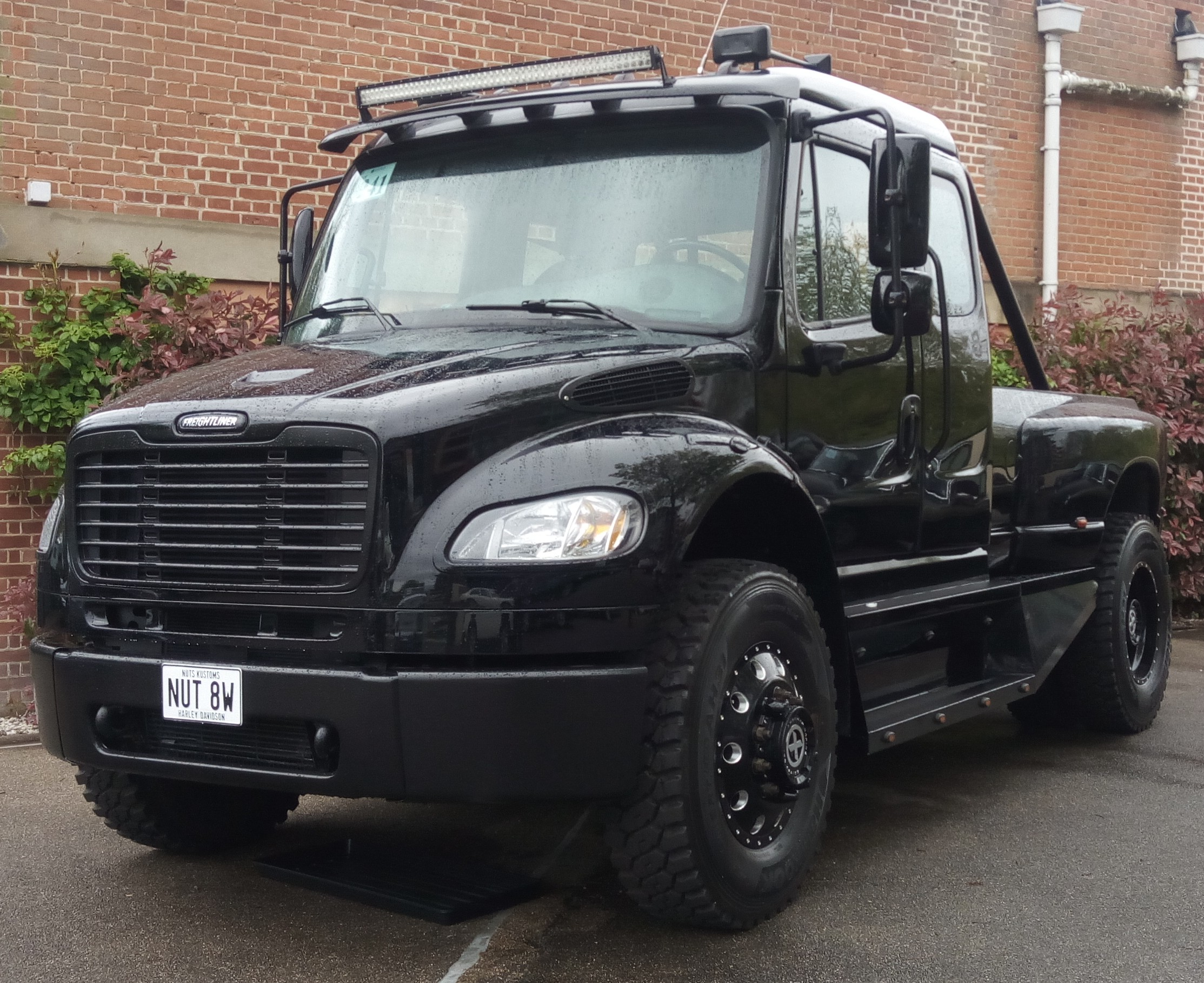
Freightliner M2 106 extended cab fitted with aftermarket pickup truck bed

Freightliner Specialty Vehicles (also known as SportChassis LLC) is a manufacturer based in Clinton, Oklahoma that produces conversions of the Business Class M2 as consumer vehicles. Several vehicles are available, including 5th-wheel tow vehicles and pickup trucks.

While similar in layout to the International CXT/RXT, these differ in that they are completed by a second-stage manufacturer.

== See also ==
- Freightliner Cascadia, another Freightliner truck with an all-electric variant.
