= Box truck =

Type of large truck

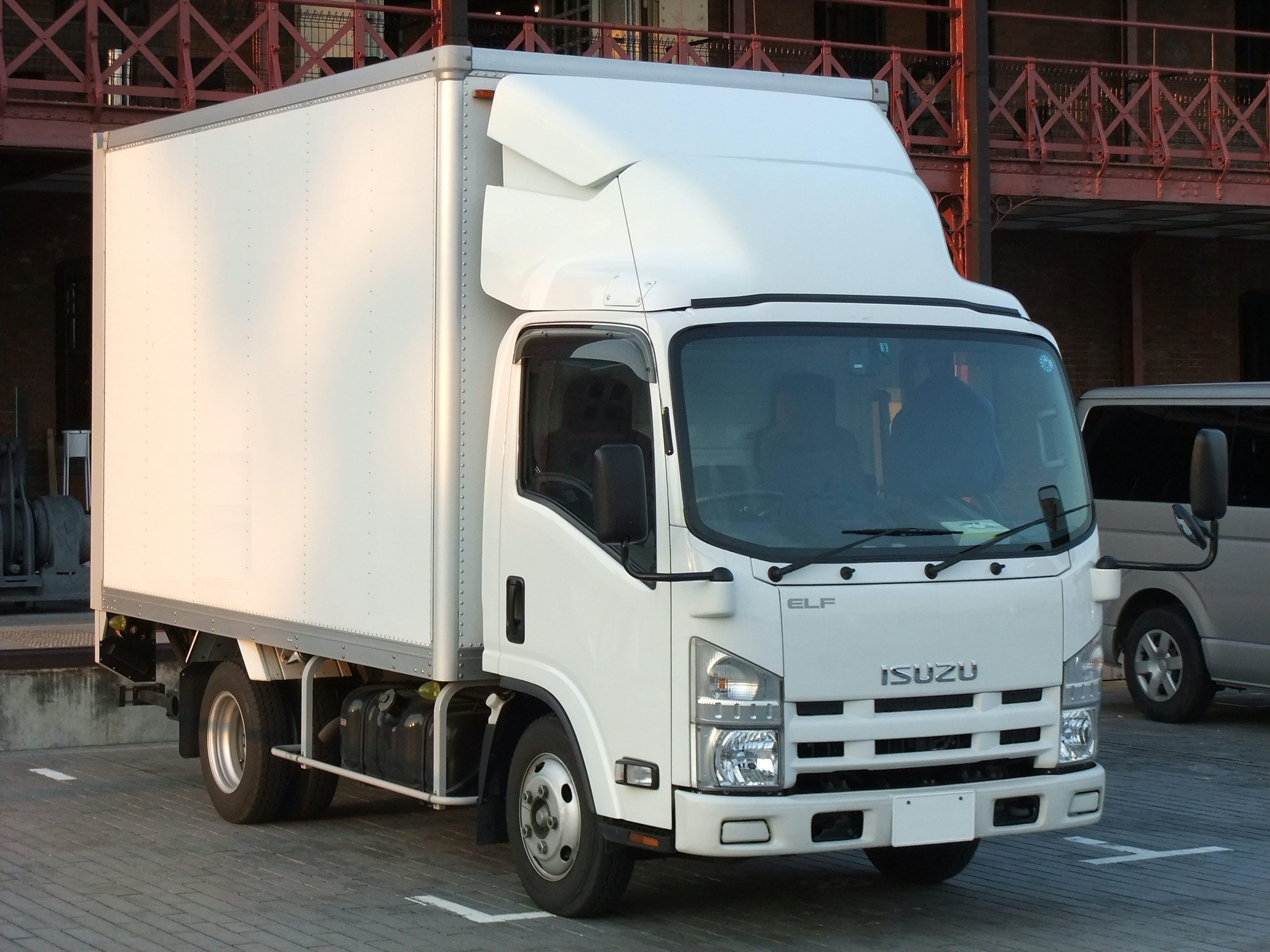
Isuzu Elf box truck

A box truck, or box van, is a chassis cab truck with an enclosed cuboid-shaped cargo area. On most box trucks, the cabin is separate to the cargo area; however some box trucks have a door between the cabin and the cargo area. Regular cab box trucks are generally larger than cargo vans but smaller than day cab tractor-trailers with movable trailers. Crew cab box trucks tend to be larger than crew vans but smaller than crew cab tractor-trailers with movable trailers.

The difference between a box truck and a van is that the cargo van is a one-piece (unibody), while a box truck is created by adding a cargo box to a chassis cab.

== North American usage ==
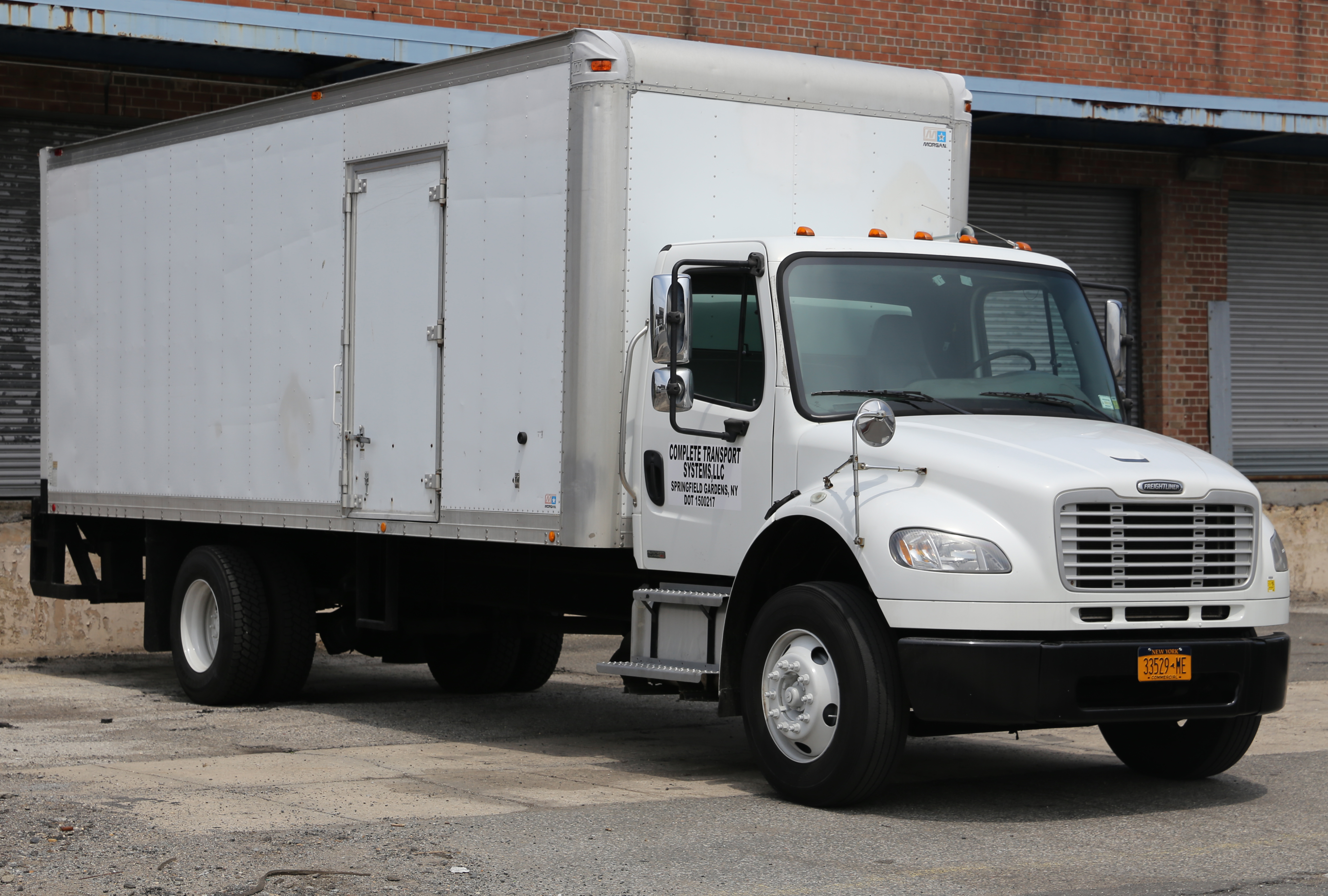
Freightliner Business Class M2 box truck

The boxes on box trucks are typically 10–26 ft (3.0–7.9 m) in length (the overall length of the box plus cab is even longer) and can range from Class 3 to Class 7 (12,500 lb. to 33,000 lb. gross vehicle weight rating). They often have a garage door-like rear door that rolls up, although some box trucks have semi-truck style swing doors. They are often used by companies transporting home appliances or furniture, or are used as moving trucks which can be rented by individuals.

Ford, Dodge and Chevrolet/GMC have historically been the most common manufacturers of conventional chassis cab (truck cab on chassis without a body) to which the cargo box is attached by various producers (called body builders or upfitters). Isuzu, Fuso and UD Trucks have been the most common producers of cab over-type medium duty chassis cab used as platforms for small box trucks. Freightliner, International, Ford, and Hino have been the most common manufacturers of large conventional box trucks.

Small box trucks often use the cab of full size vans from Ford, Chrysler or General Motors (e.g. Ford E-Series/Econoline/Ford Transit, Dodge Ram Van, Chevrolet Express/Chevrolet Van/GMC Vandura/GMC Savana), though pre-manufactured cutaway van chassis vehicles are the basis (rather than an actual cargo van), in order to reduce the labour required for production. Some small box trucks also use cab over truck chassis such as the Isuzu NPR/Chevrolet LCF. Large box trucks are based on medium-duty trucks through chassis cab trucks, mostly equipped with air brakes (e.g. Ford F-Series, Freightliner Business Class M2, Hino 600 / L-Series, International Durastar / MV).

== Box van definition in British English ==
In British English, box van is a term for a four-wheeled covered goods wagon (freight vehicle) with a fully enclosed body.

In British English the word truck refers to large open topped freight vehicles or rail freight waggons. A lorry is defined as a medium or large truck. A van is used for an enclosed railway freight carriage or medium or smaller commercial road vehicles.

=== Luton body ===
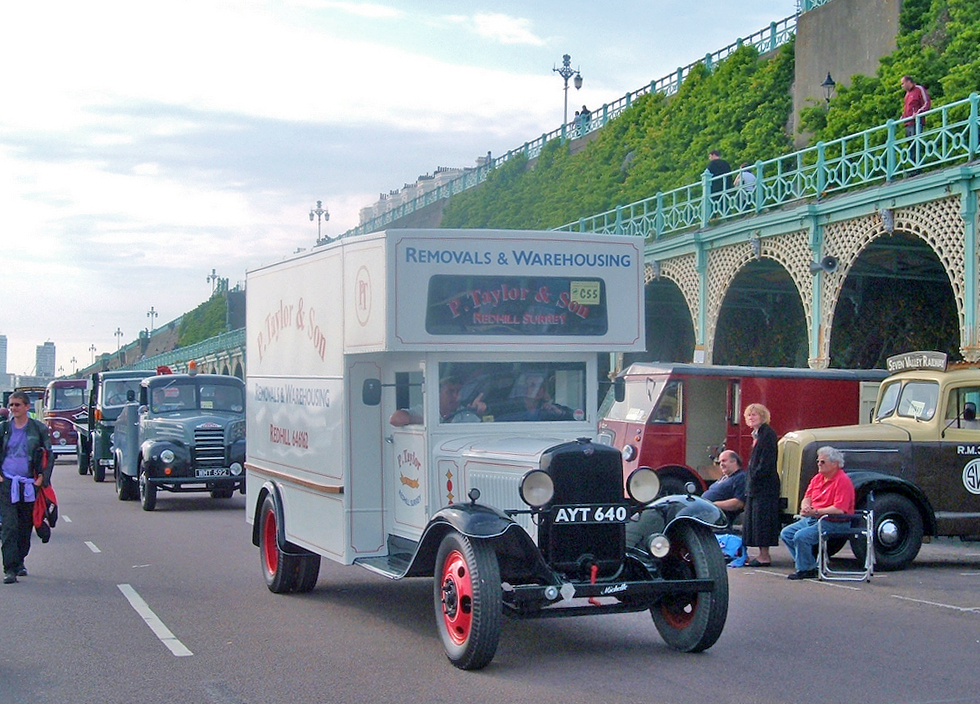
1933 Bedford two-ton Luton van

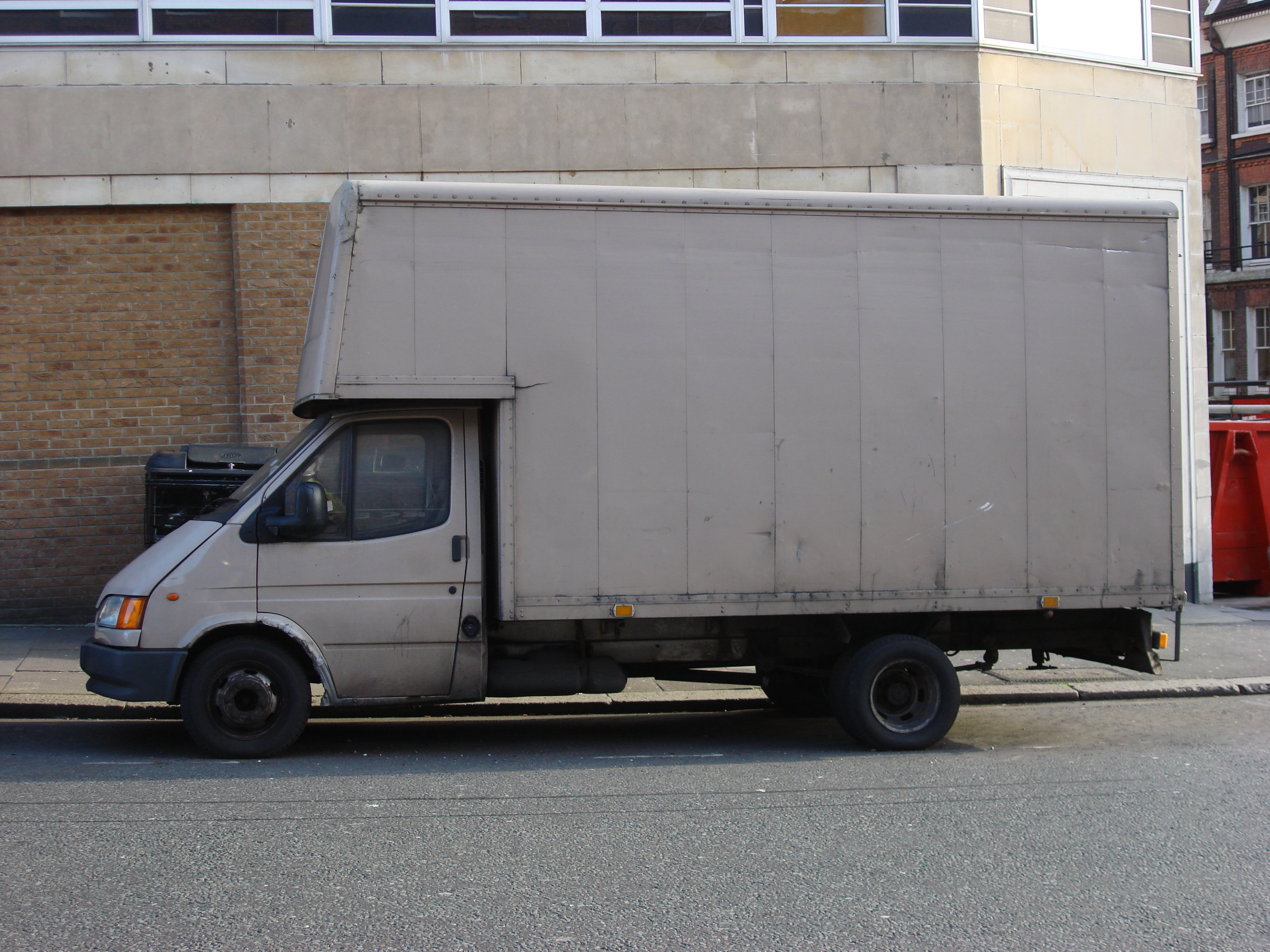
A Ford Transit van with Luton body

A Luton body is a style of commercial vehicle body incorporating an enclosed box body extended over the cab. It takes its name from the town of Luton, in Bedfordshire, where the Bedford commercial vehicle plant was located.

This style of body was designed to accommodate the high-volume, low-weight loads of straw hats which were part of Luton's industry. Straw hats were wrapped in hessian fabric in long cylinders to fit across the width of the van. It was incidental that it was the home of Bedford although all the early Luton vans were on Bedford chassis.

The body style is common in medium commercial vehicles such as the Ford Transit, as well as larger vehicles, especially those used by household removals companies as well as larger moving trucks from U-Haul. More modern examples may be streamlined to reduce wind resistance. Some commercial vehicles have a wind deflector on the cab roof, but this is not a Luton body; the Luton is functional and can be accessed from the main body. The portion of the body that rests over the cab is called the peak, also referred to, in some quarters, as a "Luton,” “Mom’s Attic,” or a "kick.”

Many commercial vehicles have tilting cabs. To allow for this, the floor of the Luton may be hinged, and there may be a hinged flap at the front.

== See also ==
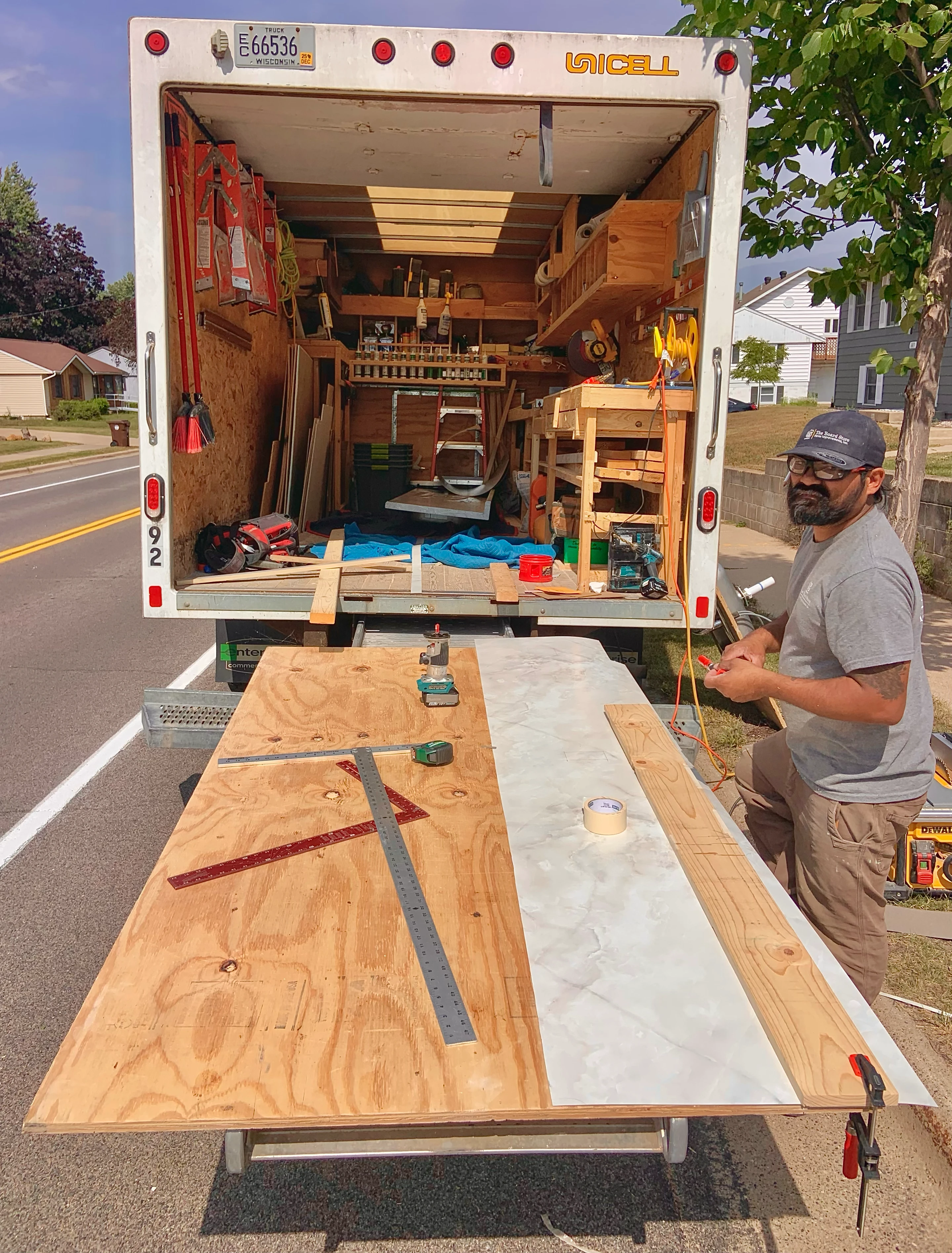
Box truck woodshop

- Flatbed truck
- Step van
