= International XT =

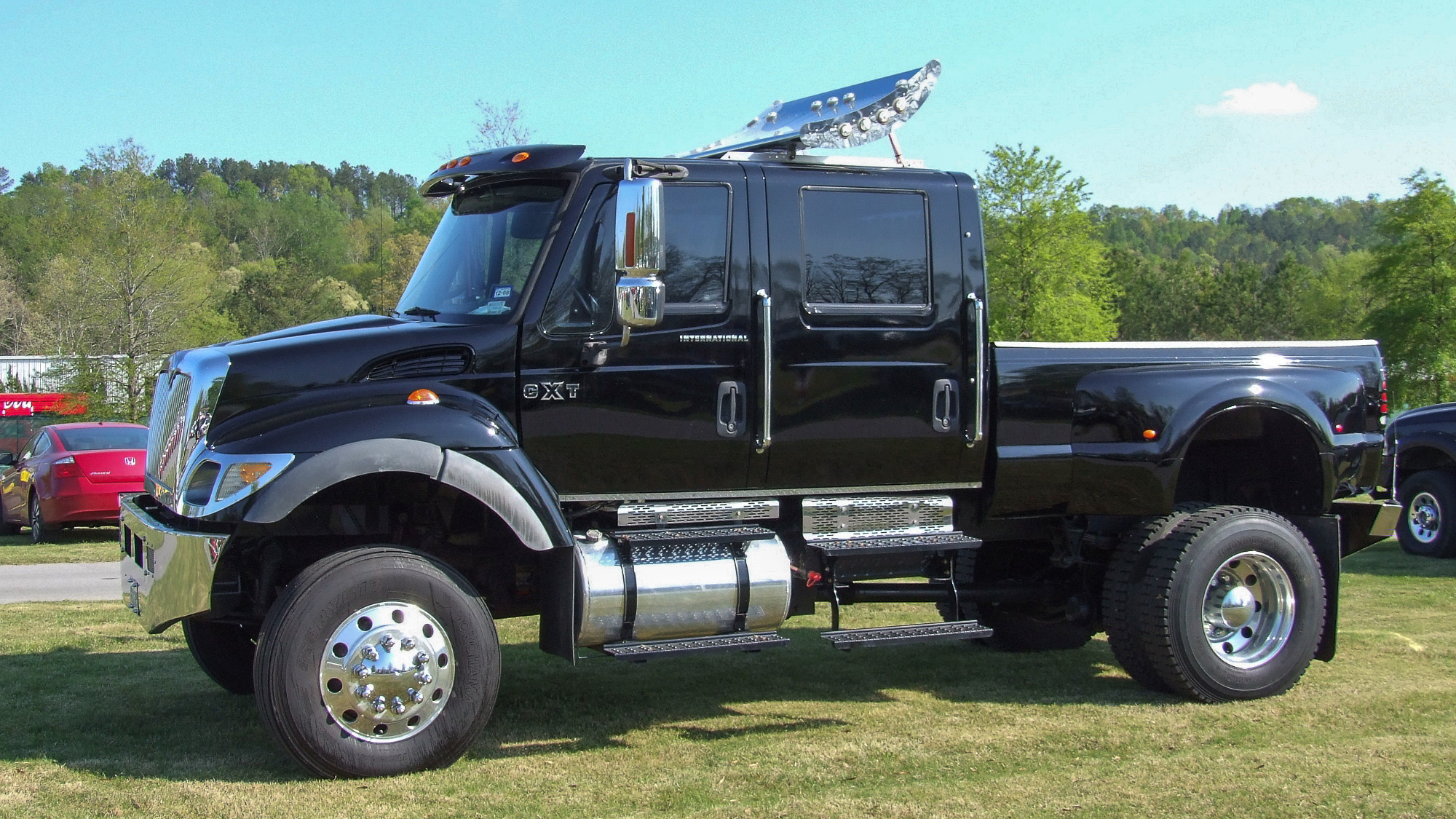
- International CXT side view

Overview
- Manufacturer: Navistar International
- Production: 2004–2008
- Assembly: Garland, Texas; Springfield, Ohio

Body and chassis
- Class: Full-size pickup truck (heavy duty)
- Body style: 2-door extended cab (CXT); 4-door crew cab (CXT, RXT, MXT)
- Layout: RXT: rear-wheel drive; CXT, MXT: All-wheel-drive
- Platform: International 7300/4300/DuraStar; International MXT-MV
- Related: Ford Super Duty (engine and bed only)

Powertrain
- Engine: 365 cu in (6.0 L) VT365 V8; 466 cu in (7.6 L) DT466 inline-6
- Transmission: 5-speed Allison 2500HD automatic (CXT); 5-speed Allison 2200 automatic (RXT); 5-speed Allison 2000 automatic (MXT)

Dimensions
- Length: 258.0 in (6,550 mm) (CXT); 272.0 in (6,910 mm) (RXT); 252.0 in (6,400 mm) (MXT)
- Width: 96.0 inches (2.44 m)
- Height: 108.0 in (2,740 mm) (CXT); 98.4 in (2,500 mm) (RXT); 91.0 in (2,310 mm) (MXT)
- Curb weight: 10,500–14,500 pounds (4,800–6,600 kg)

The International Extreme Truck Series (often identified by the acronym XT) is a range of pickup trucks produced by Navistar International from 2004 to 2008. The first International-brand vehicle marketed for non-commercial sale since 1980, the XT line also marked the return of the company to pickup truck production since the final generation of the (smaller) Light Line pickup trucks in 1975.

The largest pickup trucks ever mass-produced for retail sale, two of the XT trucks were developed from the International medium-duty truck range, while the third was a variant of an International military tactical vehicle (similar in concept to the Hummer H1). As a complement to their commercial-grade capabilities, International marketed the XT line as a dual-purpose vehicle, marketing the extroverted appearance of the vehicle as a promotional "rolling billboard" for business owners.

After 2008, Navistar ended production of all three XT-series trucks. The company assembled the vehicles in its Garland, Texas, and Springfield, Ohio, facilities.

== CXT (Commercial Extreme Truck) ==
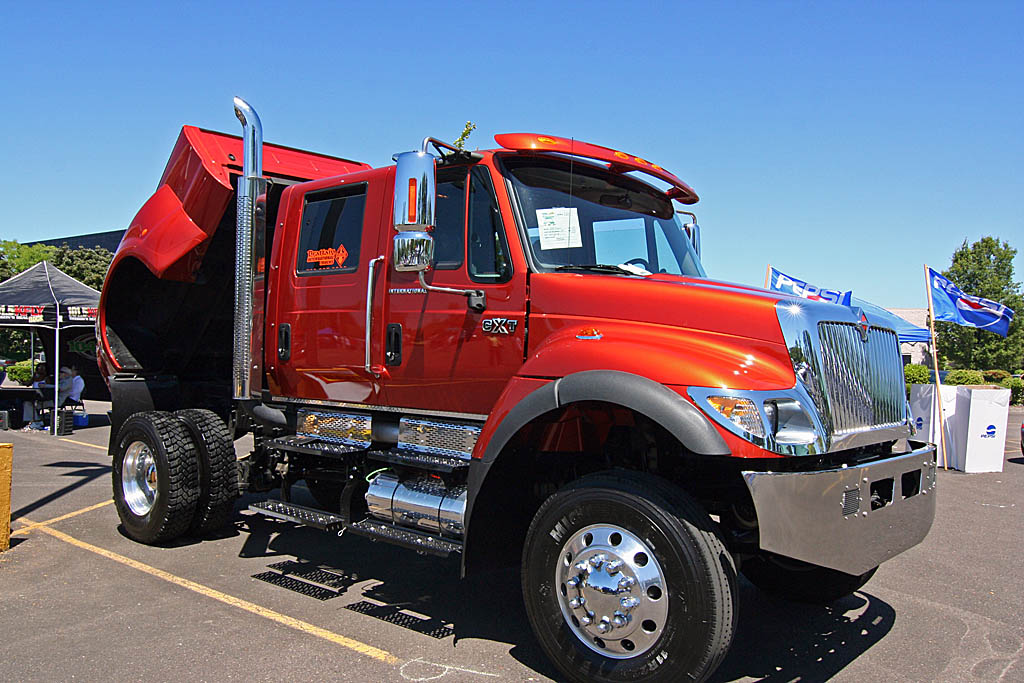
CXT with optional dump bed

The International CXT (Commercial Extreme Truck) is the first variant of the XT-Series to enter production, introduced in September 2004. At its launch, Navistar targeted the CXT towards business owners, marketing the truck as a dual-purpose vehicle. Along with putting it to use towing and hauling, the CXT could be put to use as a promotional vehicle, essentially as a large "rolling billboard".

The CXT was derived from the International 7300 (later renamed the Workstar), a Class 7 severe-service truck line. A two-door extended cab and a four-door crew cab were offered (the two-door "day cab" was not produced for the CXT). The pickup truck bed was sourced from the dual-rear-wheel Ford F-350 Super Duty; a hydraulically operated bed lift was offered as an option. In contrast to the vocationally-oriented 7300, the interior trim and features of the CXT rivaled its highest-trim highway trucks. To match smaller pickup trucks, the CXT included leather seats, wood trim, and full carpeting; interior options also included a rear-seat television screen (with DVD player), CD audio systems, and a fold-out rear seat (into a bed).

Sharing its powertrain with the 7300 and other International Class 5-7 truck lines, the CXT was powered by a 7.6 L DT466 turbodiesel inline-6; initially offered with 220 hp (164 kW), optional outputs of up to 310 hp (231 kW) (from the 9.3-liter DT 570 inline-six) were offered in 2007. The engine was paired to a 5-speed Allison 2500HD automatic transmission. The vehicle was fitted with permanent all-wheel drive, using a Meritor MTC 4208 two-speed transfer case, a 10,000 lb (4,500 kg) MX-10-120 front axle and a 17,000-lb RS-17-145 rear axle. As with International medium-duty and severe-service trucks, the CXT was equipped with anti-lock air drum brakes.

Though not the longest pickup truck ever sold in the United States, at 108 in (2.74 m) to the top of the cab, the CXT was the tallest pickup truck ever produced (remaining so, as of current production). Its 14,500 lb (6,600 kg) curb weight (approximately 4,900 lb (2,200 kg) more than the GMC Hummer EV and nearly twice that of the Ford Excursion) makes the CXT (by far) the heaviest pickup truck ever sold in North America. The 25,999 lb (11,793 kg) GVWR was deliberately specified by Navistar, as it is exactly below the universal 26,001 lb (11,794 kg) threshold of requiring a commercial driver's license (CDL) to drive (some states required a CDL, because it was equipped with air brakes). In total, the CXT had a towing capacity of 20 tons.

== RXT (Recreational Extreme Truck) ==
The International RXT (Recreational Extreme Truck) was introduced at the 2005 Chicago Auto Show. Again a dual-purpose vehicle, the RXT was marketed towards both business and recreational owners who sought a towing vehicle with commercial-grade capability. Instead of those who sought a rolling billboard, the RXT was intended as a tow vehicle for large horse and boat trailers, along with large RV trailers. Previous vehicles of the same scale had been aftermarket conversions of International 4000 series and Freightliner Business Class medium-duty trucks, with the RXT as the first pickup truck produced directly by a medium-duty truck manufacturer.

Visually similar to the taller (by 10 in (25 cm)) CXT, the RXT was derived from the smaller International 4200 (later the Durastar), a Class 6 medium-duty truck; the line was offered solely as a four-door crew cab. Alongside its lower hoodline, different grille, and flush-mounted headlights, the on-road-oriented RXT was fitted with body skirting and an aerodynamic front bumper. In line with the CXT, the RXT was also offered with a premium interior. In contrast to the severe-service underpinnings of the CXT, the RXT was fitted with a 6.0 L VT365 turbodiesel V8 (the 6.0L Ford Powerstroke V8); a 5-speed Allison 2200 automatic transmission was standard. In contrast to the air brakes of the CXT, the RXT was fitted with 4-wheel hydraulic disc brakes; all examples were fitted with two-wheel drive.

At 272 in (690 cm) long, the International RXT remains the longest mass-produced pickup truck ever sold in North America Though nearly 3,500 lb (1,600 kg) lighter than the CXT, the model remained almost twice as heavy as gasoline-engine one-ton pickup trucks. With a 20,500 lb (9,300 kg) GVWR, the RXT was rated to tow 12 tons.

=== Project XT ===
Alongside the debut of the production RXT, International unveiled the ProjectXT concept truck at the 2005 Chicago Auto Show. Distinguished by aerodynamically enhanced exterior trim, ProjectXT featured a purpose-built cargo bed; along to better integrate with the rest of the body, the bed was designed to eliminate any intrusion from the rear wheels. The interior was fitted with additionally upgraded interior trim (distinguished by dual roof skylights).

== MXT (Military/Most eXtreme Truck) ==
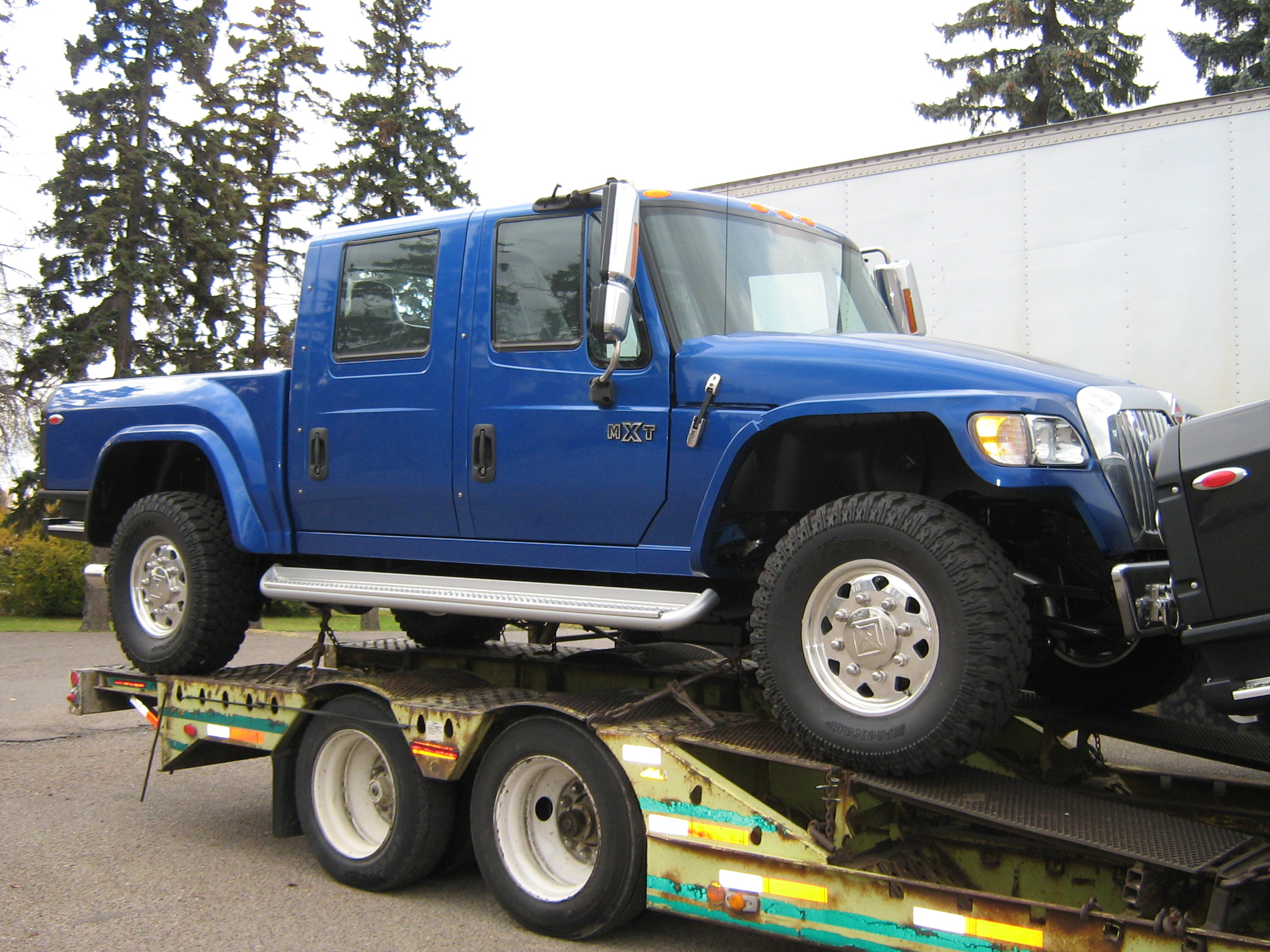
International MXT on dealer delivery trailer

The International MXT (MXT, for Military or Most Extreme Truck) is the smallest version of the XT family, developed from the International MXT-MV tactical vehicle. Though over 12 in (30 cm) taller and 68 in (170 cm) longer, the MXT is similar in configuration to the four-door Hummer H1 pickup truck. International debuted the MXT as a concept vehicle alongside the release of the RXT at the 2005 Chicago Auto Show. After showing a pre-production prototype in 2006, International began production of the MXT for 2007.

In contrast to the CXT and RXT, the MXT was not derived from an International production line, instead sharing a number of elements from its military namesake. The design and development work for the vehicle was done by an International Truck subsidiary called Diamond Force Engineering, located in Dearborn Heights, Michigan. Sharing its crew cab with the CXT (and multiple International truck lines), the purpose-built frame of the MXT allowed it to sit 17 in (43 cm) lower. The front fenders were revised for optimum ground clearance (raised nearly to the hoodline); the MXT sourced its headlights from the 9000-Series trucks and its grille from the DuraStar. The 202-inch wheelbase of the MXT was the longest of the three pickup trucks; in place of the Ford-sourced cargo bed, International introduced a custom-designed bed (distinct from its military counterpart). As the MXT was fitted with permanent all-wheel drive and also was intended for off-road use, the six commercial truck tires of the CXT/RXT were replaced by four wheels fitted with heavy-duty off-road tires.

The MXT shared its engine with the RXT, using a 300 hp (224 kW) 6.0-liter VT365 turbodiesel V8 (instead using a 5-speed Allison 2000 transmission); full-time all-wheel drive was standard. The lowest-capacity vehicle of the XT line, the MXT was a Class 5 truck (the smallest medium-duty truck), with a 14,000–18,000 lb (6,400–8,200 kg) GVWR.

=== MXT Limited ===
To commemorate its 100th anniversary of road-vehicle production (the 1907 debut of the International Harvester Auto-Buggy, with the 1908 Auto Wagon serving as one of the first pickup trucks), International debuted the MXT Limited alongside the standard MXT. Distinguished by its monochrome exterior, mesh grille trim, and non-commercial side mirrors, the MXT Limited was also fitted with an upgraded interior. Similar to the CXT, the MXT Limited also offered full carpeting, leather front and rear seats (with 2+2 seating), and upgraded electronic features, including both seatback and overhead TV monitors (with DVD player), dash-mounted navigation, and a rear-seat gaming console.

== Specifications ==
| | CXT | RXT | MXT |
|---|---|---|---|
| Length (in) | 258.0 | 272.0 | 252.0 |
| Width (in) | 96.0 | 96.0 | 96.0 |
| Height (in) | 108.0 | 98.4 | 91.0 |
| Wheelbase (in) | 175.0 | 169.0 | 202.0 |
| GAWR (lbs) Gross Axle Weight Rating (Front) | 10,000 | 8,000 | 6,500 |
| GAWR (lbs) Gross Axle Weight Rating (Rear) | 17,000 | 15,880 | 8,500 |
| GVWR (lbs) Gross Vehicle Weight Rating | 25,999 | 23,880 | 15,000 |
| Vehicle Curb Weight (lbs) | 14,500 | 10,900 | 10,500 |
| Payload Capacity (lbs) | 11,500 | 12,980 | 4,500 |
| Max Tow Rating (lbs) | 11,500 | 12,980 | 4,500 |
| Towing Capacity (lbs) | 40,000 (20 tons) | 24,000 (12 tons) | 18,000 (9 tons) |
| CDL Needed (truck only) | No | No | No |
| CDL Needed (truck & trailer under 10K GVWR) | No | No | No |
| CDL Needed (truck & trailer over 10K GVWR) | Yes | Yes | No |
| Engine | 2004-2007: International 7.6L DT466 I6 2008: International 7.6L MaxxForceDT I6 | 2005-2007: International 6.0L VT365 V8 2008: International 6.4L MaxxForce 7 V8 | 2006-2007: International 6.0L VT365 V8 2008: International 6.4L MaxxForce 7 V8 |
| Transmission | Allison 2500 5-speed automatic | Allison 2200 5-speed automatic | Allison 2200 RDS 5-speed automatic |
