= Freightliner C2 =

Chassis for a type of school bus

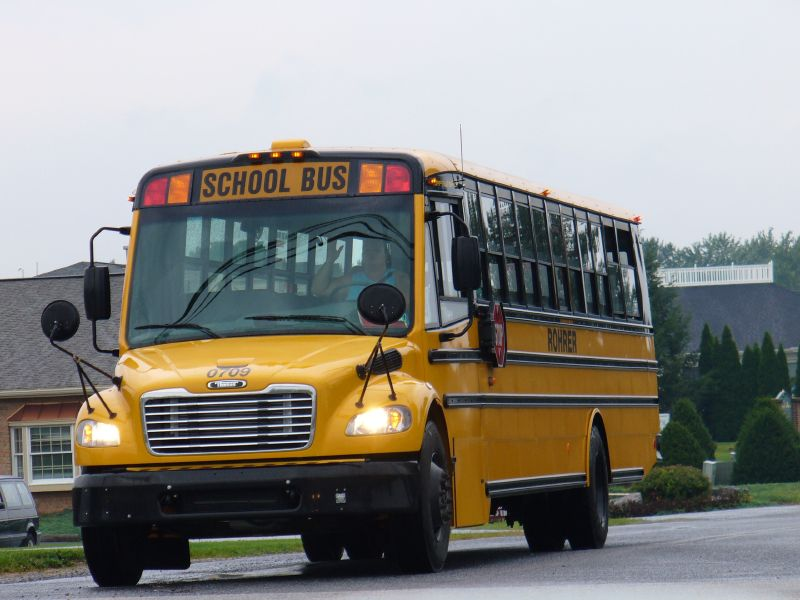
- 2007 Thomas Saf-T-Liner C2 with a Freightliner C2 chassis

Overview
- Manufacturer: Daimler Truck North America
- Production: 2004–present
- Assembly: United States: Gaffney, South Carolina

Body and chassis
- Class: Type C (conventional)
- Layout: 4×2
- Body styles: Cowled chassis: School bus; Commercial bus
- Vehicles: Thomas Built Buses Saf-T-Liner C2
- Related: Freightliner Business Class M2

Powertrain
- Engines: Diesel: Cummins B Series; Propane; Compressed Natural Gas (CNG); Electric

Dimensions
- Wheelbase: 158–279″
- Width: 96″
- Curb weight: 18,000–35,000 lbs (GVWR)

Chronology
- Predecessor: Freightliner FS-65

The Freightliner C2 is a Type C conventional bus chassis manufactured by Daimler Truck North America, used for school bus applications. It was introduced in 2004 as the replacement for the FS-65. The C2 uses the hood, firewall, steering column, and dashboard of the Freightliner Business Class M2 medium-duty conventional.

== Body manufacturers ==
As a bus chassis, the C2 is only used by Thomas Built Buses as the basis for the Thomas Saf-T-Liner C2. As Thomas is a subsidiary of Freightliner, there are no plans by other body manufacturers to utilize the C2 chassis. However, the standard Freightliner M2 chassis is available to the commercial and shuttle bus industry as a cutaway cab as the Freightliner B2.

== Powertrain ==
Engines - Current Offerings

Engine	Displacement	Horsepower ranges	Torque ranges	Fuel
Detroit Diesel DD5	5.1L	200-240 hp	560-660 lb-ft	Diesel
Cummins B6.7	6.7L	200-260 hp	520-660 lb-ft	Diesel
Cummins Westport B6.7N	6.7L	240 hp	560 lb-ft	CNG
DriveForce 8.0L	8.0L	339 hp	495 lb-ft	LPG
DriveForce 8.8L	8.8L	270 hp	565 lb-ft	LPG

Engines - Prior Offerings

Engine	Displacement	Horsepower ranges
Mercedes-Benz MBE900	4.8L	190 hp
Mercedes-Benz MBE900	7.2L	250-330 hp
Mercedes-Benz MBE900	6.4L	190-250 hp
Cummins ISB	6.7L	200-280 hp
Caterpillar C7	7.2L	190-275 hp
John Deere CNG	8.1L	375 hp
Drive Force Propane V8	8.0L	350 hp

Transmissions

The C2 comes standard with an Allison 2500 automatic transmission. Also available are Fuller 5-speed manual transmission and the Allison 3000 automatic.

== See also ==
- List of buses
- School Bus
- Thomas Saf-T-Liner C2
