= International MXT-MV =

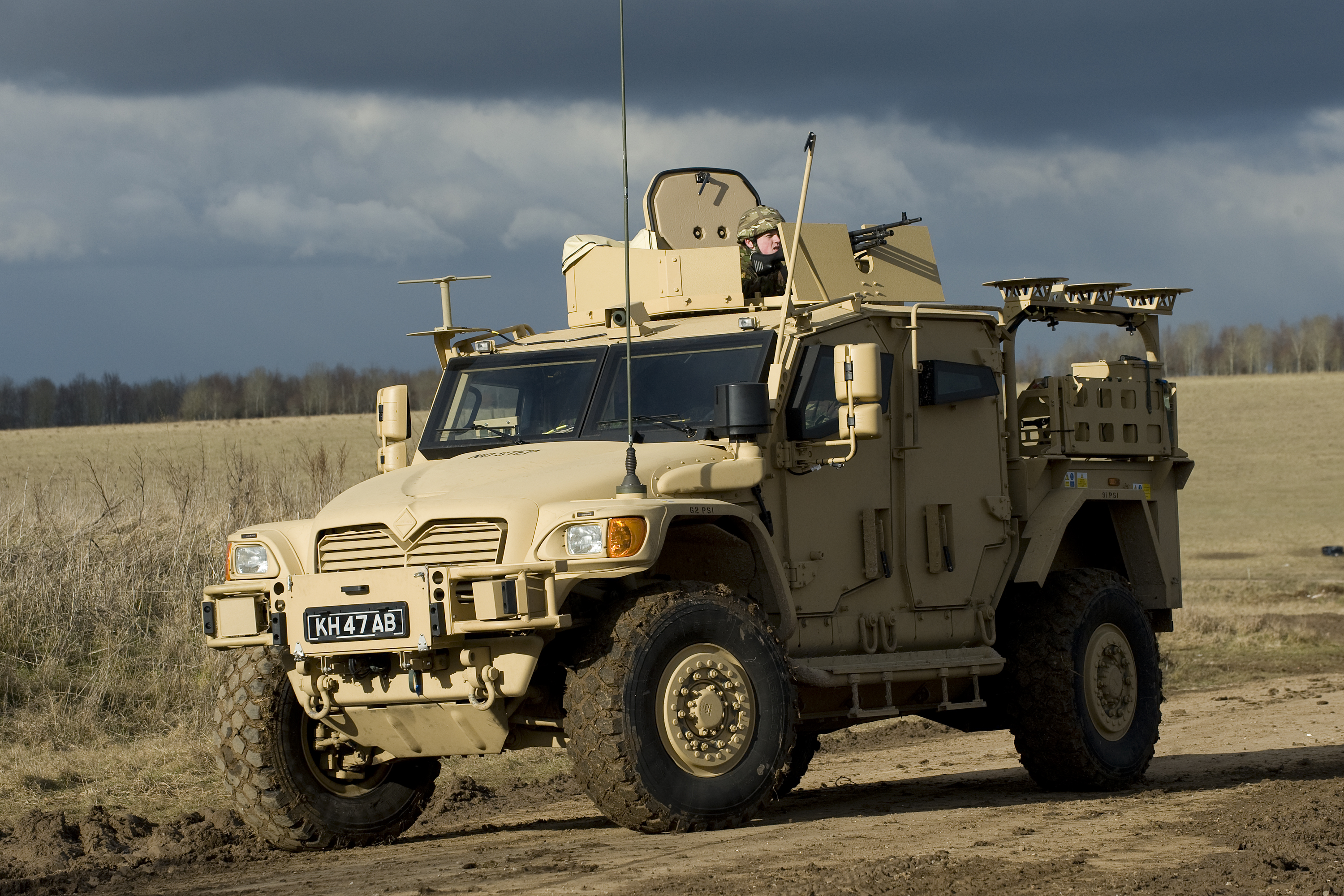
- British 'Husky TSV' armoured vehicle
- Type: Infantry mobility vehicle
- Place of origin: United States

Service history
- In service: 2006–present
- Used by: See Operators

Production history
- Designer: International Military and Government
- Designed: 2005
- Manufacturer: Navistar Defense
- Produced: 2006–present
- Variants: See Variants

Specifications
- Length: 230–270 in (5.84–6.86 m)
- Width: 96 in (2.44 m)
- Height: 93 in (2.36 m) (operational); 91 in (2.3 m) (transport)
- Crew: 2+10
- Armor: Variable level armor kits
- Main armament: Manual turret armed with FN MAG, FN Minimi, M2 Browning or HK GMG or Protector remote weapon station
- Engine: International VT 365
- Transmission: Allison 2500 SP
- Suspension: 4x4, wheeled
- Ground clearance: 12 in (0.30 m)
- Operational range: 400 mi (644 km)

The International MXT-MV (Military Extreme Truck – Military Version) is an infantry mobility vehicle produced by Navistar Defense, a subsidiary of Navistar International, which is the owner of the International brand of vehicles. Introduced in 2006 and developed in parallel with the civilian International MXT, the MXT-MV is extensively modified for military duty compared to its civilian counterpart. It is transportable by the Lockheed C-130 Hercules military aircraft.

== History ==
The MXT-MV was designed and developed by Navistar International's International Military and Government division (now named Navistar Defense) and a subsidiary of Navistar International called Diamond Force Engineering (which was based in Dearborn Heights, Michigan). The development was led by Jim Bartel, Dick Rief, Wes Schultz, Ron Byrd, John Glass, Paul Klein and Britt Smart. The MXT-MV was exhibited at the 2005 edition of the annual Association of the United States Army (AUSA) Show, held in October at the Washington Convention Center. In August the following year, the MXT-MVA version was demonstrated to the United States Army at the Aberdeen Proving Ground. The MXT-MVA was Navistar's entry in the 2008 selection competition for the US Army's MRAP All Terrain Vehicle (M-ATV) program, but the Army chose to procure the Oshkosh M-ATV instead.

In 2009 a modified variant of the MXT-MVA was ordered for service with the British Army. This variant was known as the Husky in British military service. The Husky was ordered to replace the British Army's Snatch Land Rovers in Afghanistan, which had proven to be inadequate in protecting their occupants from improvised explosive devices. A total of 262 vehicles were initially ordered. In 2010, a follow-up order was placed for an additional 89 vehicles, worth US$56 million.

== Variants ==
Variants are available with three different cab configurations: Standard, Extended Cab, and Crew Cab.

=== MXT-MV ===
Standard, unarmored version.

=== MXT-MVA ===
The MXT-MVA (Military Extreme Truck - Military Version Armored) was designed by Israeli vehicle manufacturer Plasan. It offers the choice of two removable armor kits, dubbed A-Kit and B-Kit, with increasing levels of protection against bullets, mines and improvised explosive devices.

=== Husky TSV ===
The Husky is a variant of the MXT-MVA modified to satisfy the United Kingdom's Ministry of Defence requirements for the Tactical Support Vehicle (TSV) program for the British Army.

=== M-ATV ===
Navistar built its rejected M-ATV candidate sharing some powertrain and suspension components with the MXT, but with a unique chassis. This protection system was designed by Navistar rather than its normal MXT and MRAP partner, Plasan.

== Operators ==
=== Current operators ===
- Ghana – 70 former British Army vehicles, delivered as military aid from the United Kingdom in 2022.
- Ukraine – Unknown number of former British Army vehicles, delivered as military aid from the United Kingdom in 2022. Oryx recorded 21 vehicles of Husky variant that were lost, of which 13 were destroyed, 4 damaged, 2 abandoned and 2 captured.

=== Former operators ===
- United Kingdom (351) Husky Tactical Support Vehicle (Medium) - 351 vehicles originally ordered (262 in 2009, 89 in 2010) for service in the War in Afghanistan (2001–2021) and the Iraq War. Retired in 2022.
