= Freightliner Business Class (FL-Series) =

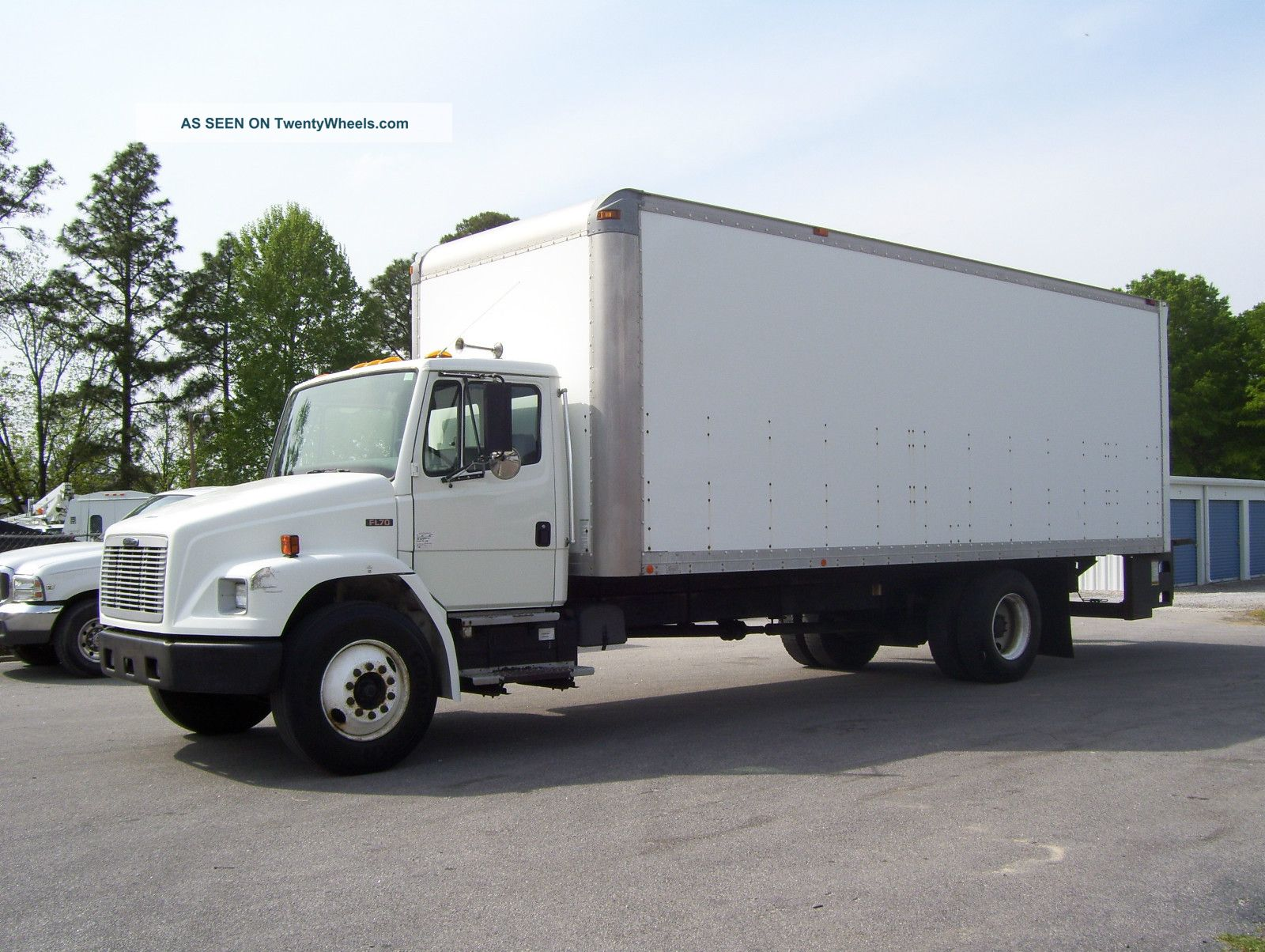
- 2003 Freightliner FL70 with van body

Overview
- Type: Truck
- Manufacturer: Freightliner Trucks
- Production: 1991-2007

Body and chassis
- Class: Class 5-8
- Body style: 2-door daycab; 2-door extended cab; 4-door crewcab
- Related: Freightliner FLC112; Freightliner FS-65; Mercedes-Benz LKN

Powertrain
- Engine: Diesel (Caterpillar, Cummins)

Chronology
- Predecessor: Mercedes-Benz L-series
- Successor: Freightliner Business Class M2

The Freightliner Business Class (FL-Series) is a range of medium-duty (Class 5–8) trucks that was assembled by the American manufacturer Freightliner Trucks from 1991 to 2007. The first medium-duty trucks sold by the company, the FL60/FL70 replaced the Mercedes-Benz L-series trucks which were withdrawn from the United States market during 1991. The Business Class range was sold as both a straight truck and a semitractor. During the late 1990s, the Business Class would become popular in bus applications, in both cowled-chassis (school bus) and cutaway-cab configurations.

In 2001, Freightliner introduced the Freightliner Business Class M2 as the second-generation Business Class, selling variants of the FL-Series concurrently through 2007, it used Cummins, Mercedes Benz and Caterpillar engines.

== Design ==
The first all-new medium-duty conventional truck range introduced in North America since 1980, the design of the Freightliner Business Class was derived heavily upon an existing product range. Using the mass-produced cab of the Mercedes-Benz LK (Leichte Klasse, light class) introduced in 1983, which had already been transplanted into other Freightliner trucks like the FLC112 in 1985 (with addition of a bonnet to the European cab-over cab structure), Freightliner began development on its first medium-duty truck, essentially serving as a replacement for the Brazilian-built Mercedes-Benz L-Series trucks sold in the United States. Freightliner had been owned by Daimler-Benz since 1981, and tooling up for the production of a crash-tested steel cab is among the most expensive items in truck development. Thus, sharing a cab structure is a major cost-saving procedure. Competitors from Ford and General Motors used pickup-truck cabs.

== Variants ==
=== Truck ===
Introduced in 1991, the FL-Series would feature a full range of medium-duty trucks in the Class 6-7 range. In place of the FLC112 (and most other Freightliners) named for its BBC (bumper to back of cab length), the initial models of the Business Class were identified by size range. The FL60 was a Class 6 truck; the FL70, a Class 7 truck. Later, the Class 5 FL50 was added at the bottom of the range. The FL112 is the class 8 model of the line and replaced the earlier FLC112 for model year 1995. It was the only truck of the FL series that continued to use its BBC in its model designation throughout its production life. The FL112 also previewed many design elements that would appear on the 1996 Century Class later in 1995.

=== Bus ===
In 1997, Freightliner began producing the Business Class for bus applications; the Freightliner FS-65 cowled chassis is produced primarily for school bus use. Additionally, the Business Class was also produced as a cutaway cab for non-school bus bodies. Following the acquisition of Thomas Built Buses in 1998, the FS65 was bodied by Thomas exclusively after 2001.

== Gallery ==
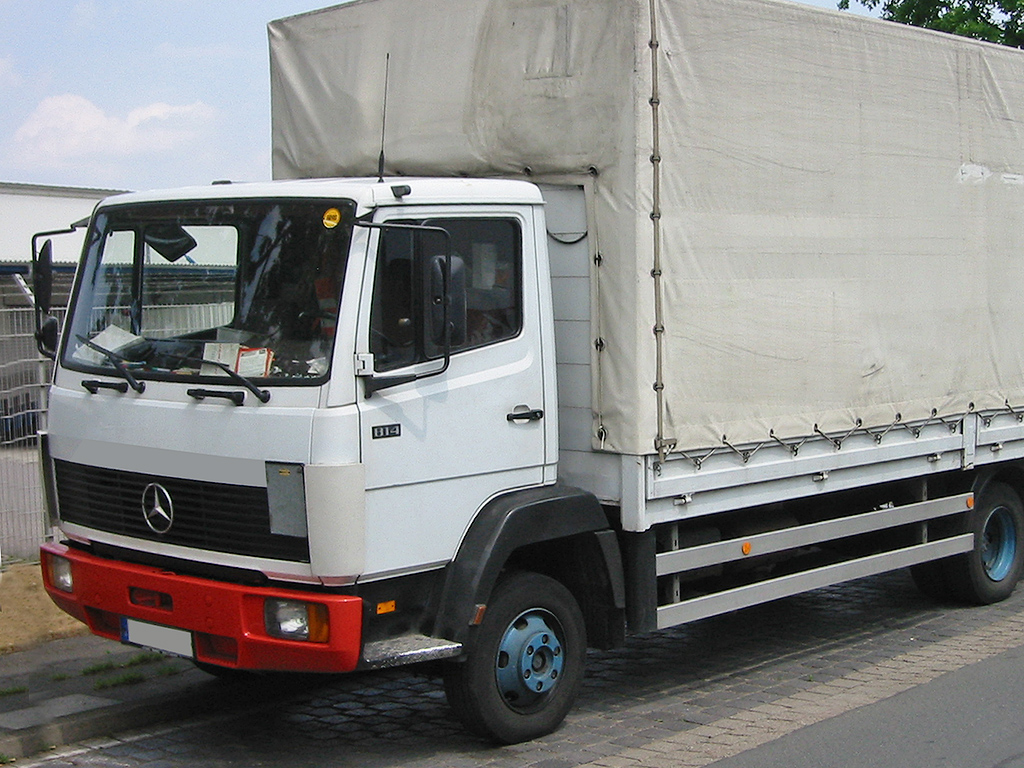
The Mercedes-Benz LK cab was adapted for the Business Class

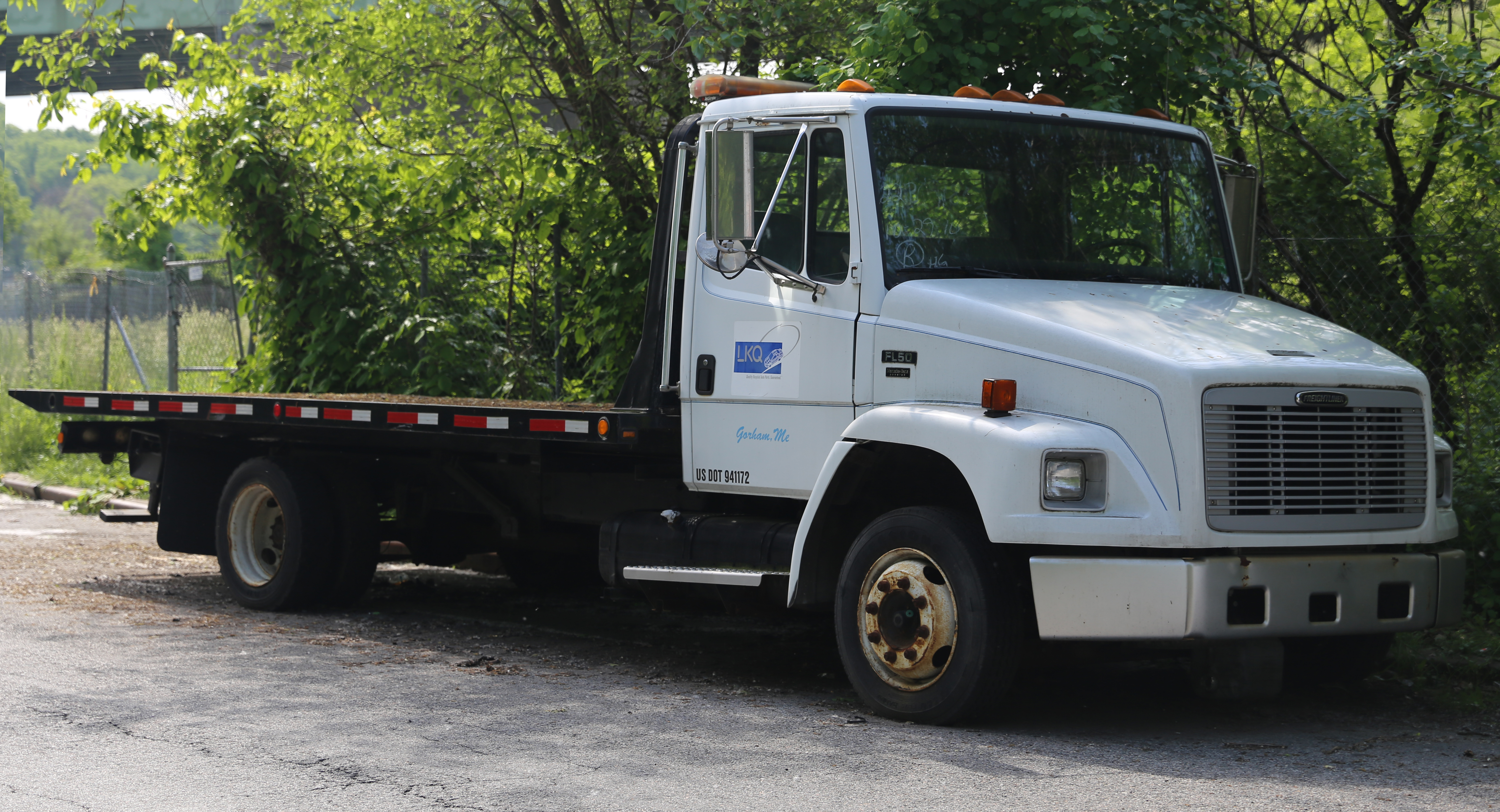
2003 Freightliner FL50 (Class 5) truck

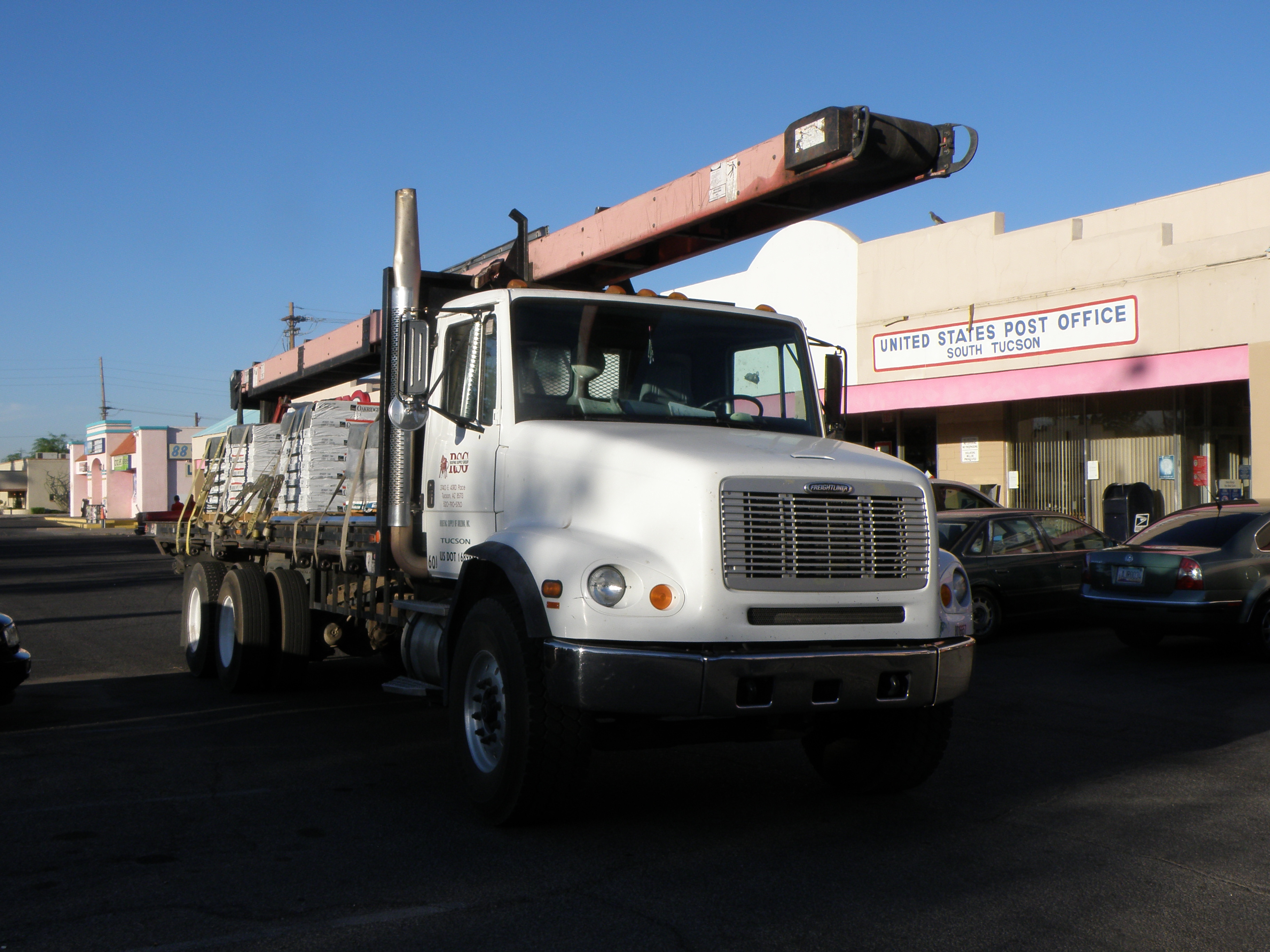
Freightliner FL 112 (Class 8 model)
