= Perley =

Perley may refer to:

== People ==
=== Given name ===
- Perley Dunn Aldrich (1863–1933), vocal teacher, composer and conductor
- Perley B. Johnson (1798–1870), American politician and U.S. Representative from Ohio
- Perley Keyes (1774–1834), American politician from New York
- Perley G. Nutting (1873–1949), American optical physicist, and the founder of the Optical Society of America (OSA)
- Perley A. Pitcher (1877–1939), American lawyer and politician
- Perley P. Pitkin (1826–1891), US Civil War figure from Vermont
- Perley Ason Ross (1883–1938), American experimental physicist
- Perley Poore Sheehan (1875–1943), American writer and film director
- Perley J. Shumway, American politician
- Perley A. Thomas (1874–1958), Canadian-born American industrialist and entrepreneur

=== Middle name ===
- George Perley Phenix (1864–1930), American university president and teacher

=== Surname ===
- George Halsey Perley (1857–1938), American born Canadian politician and diplomat
- Mary Elizabeth Perley (1863–?), American educator and author
- William Goodhue Perley (1820–1890), businessman and member of the Canadian House of Commons from 1887 to 1890

== Places ==
=== Canada ===
- Perley Bridge (1931–1998), a bridge connecting Hawkesbury, Ontario and Grenville, Quebec
- Perley River, a stream in Quebec

=== United States ===
- Perley, Minnesota

== Enterprises ==
- Perley A. Thomas Car Works, a 20th-century builder of wooden and steel streetcars, based in High Point, North Carolina in the United States.
