= Waterford, Rhode Island =

Village in Massachusetts, United States

Coordinates: 42°00′45″N 71°32′18″W

Waterford is a village located on and around St. Paul Street in North Smithfield, Rhode Island and Blackstone, Massachusetts. The Blackstone River and Branch River converge just south of the village.

Turn-of-the 20th century photo of Mammoth Mill (1864) off Canal Street with the old Blackstone Canal (1828) and Blackstone River in the foreground

Waterford was developed in 1824 by Welcome Farnum, a Yankee entrepreneur, who purchased land, built a dam on the Branch River, and constructed the first textile mill called Red Mill. He named the village Waterford because many of the Irish workers in his mill came from Waterford, Ireland. The last mills in the area were constructed mid-nineteenth century. Waterford is home to St. Paul's Church (1851), originally served a largely Irish population, and sits on the Rhode Island/Massachusetts border. Adjacent to the church is the church school and many businesses.

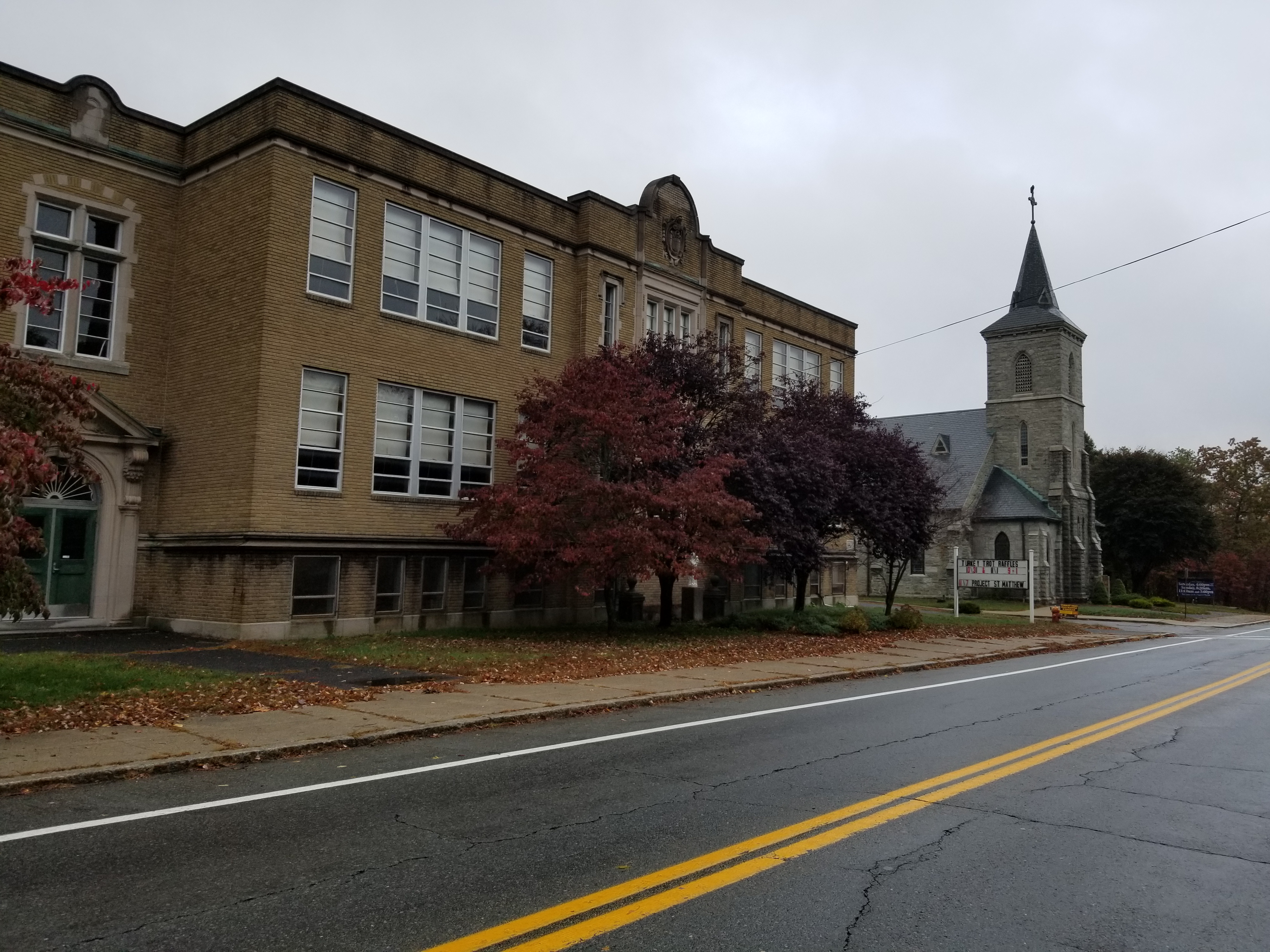
St Paul Street School (1927) and Church (1851) straddles the border between Blackstone, Massachusetts and North Smithfield, Rhode Island

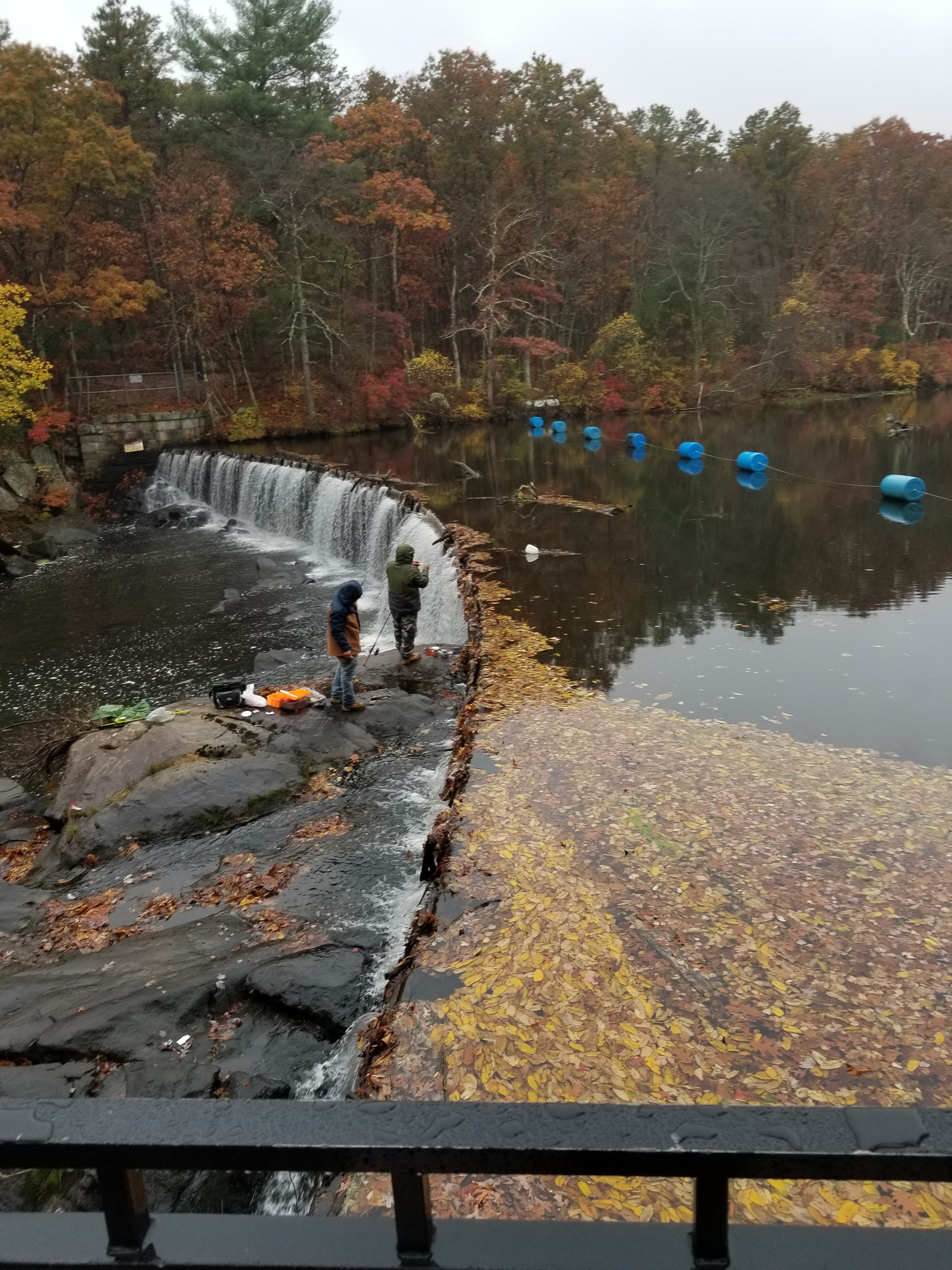
Fishermen on Blackstone River Dam near Massachusetts–Rhode Island border

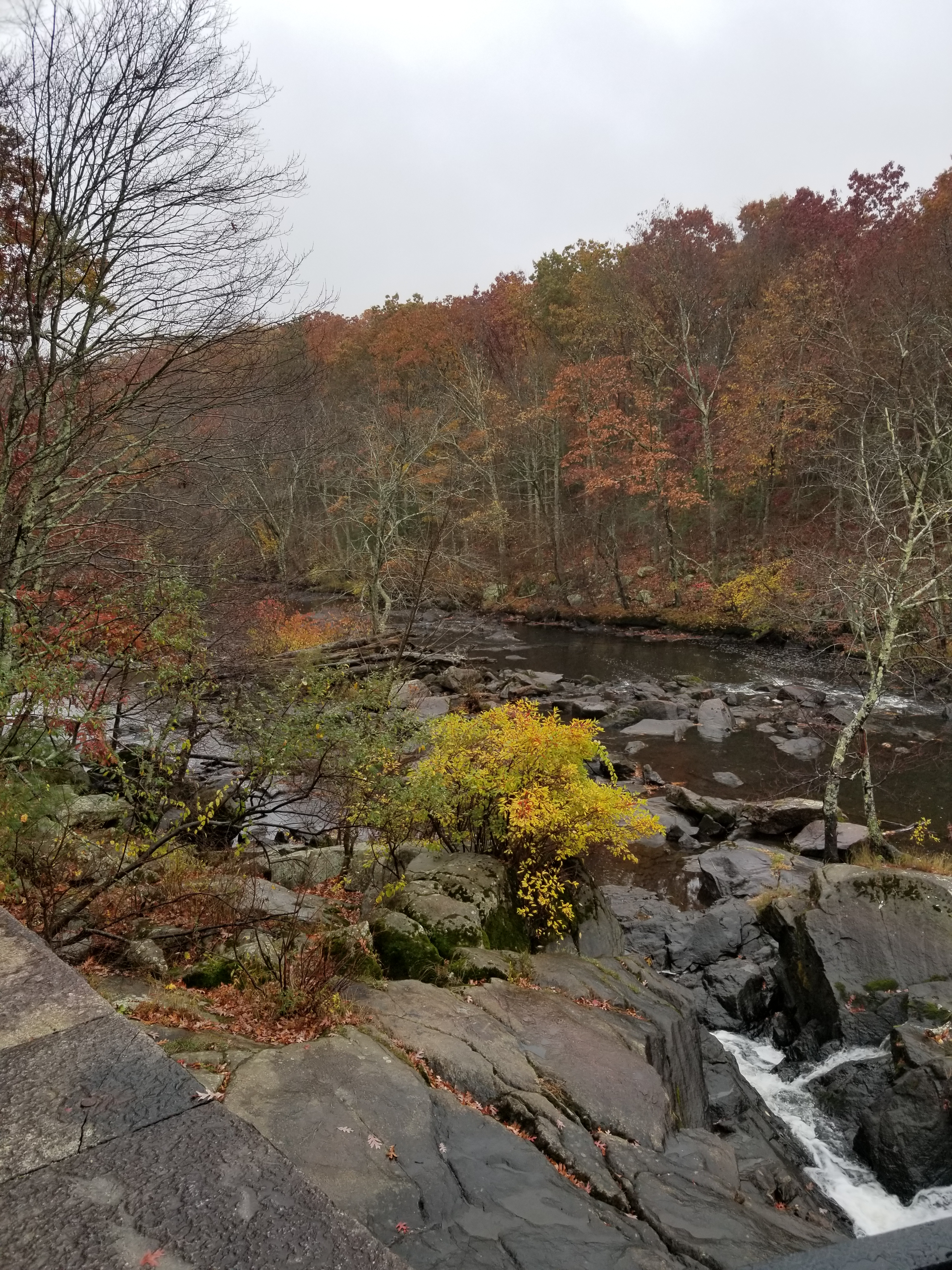
Blackstone River gorge in Blackstone Massachusetts, Massachusetts, and North Smithfield, Rhode Island

== See also ==
- Farnum's Gate Historic District, encompassing part of the Massachusetts side of the village

== External links and references ==
- Walter Nebiker, The History of North Smithfield (Somersworth, NH: New England History Press, 1976).
