= International Loadstar (bus chassis) =

Cowled bus chassis model

International Loadstar "Schoolmaster"
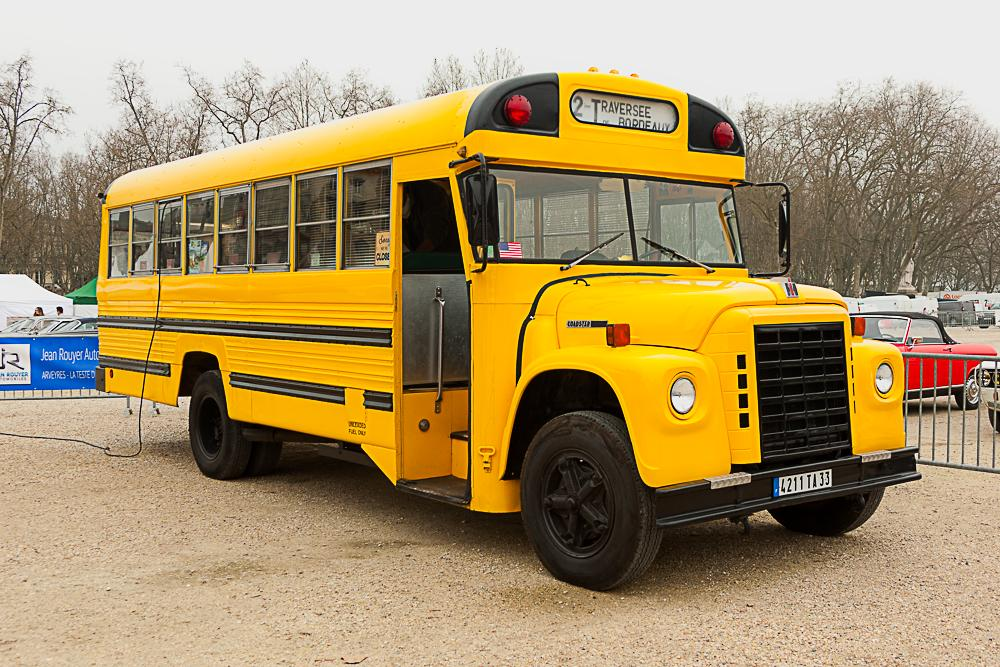
- International Loadstar with Superior body (exported)

Overview
- Manufacturer: International Harvester Company
- Also called: International Loadstar 1703/1803 "Schoolmaster"
- Production: 1962–1978
- Assembly: United States: Springfield, Ohio

Body and chassis
- Class: Class 6
- Body styles: Cowled chassis (conventional): School bus; Commercial bus; Stripped chassis (FC/RE): School bus; Commercial bus
- Related: International Loadstar

Powertrain
- Engines: Gasoline: International Harvester 345 cubic-inch V8; International Harvester MV-404 6.6 liter V8; International Harvester MV-446 7.3 liter V8; Diesel: International Harvester D-170 9.0 liter V8; International Harvester DT466 7.6 L (466 cu in) (1974–1978?); Detroit Diesel 6V53
- Transmissions: 4-speed manual 5-speed manual Allison AT545 4-speed automatic Allison MT643 4-speed automatic

Dimensions
- Wheelbase: 152 in (3,861 mm); 170 in (4,318 mm); 193 in (4,902 mm); 216 in (5,486 mm); 254 in (6,452 mm); 276 in (7,010 mm)

Chronology
- Predecessor: International R series
- Successor: International S series

The bus chassis variant of the International Loadstar is a cowled bus chassis that was produced by the International Harvester Company from 1961 to 1978, beginning with the 1962 model year. Produced primarily for school bus applications, the chassis was also produced for other applications, including commercial-use buses. In addition, the cowled chassis formed the basis for front-engine and rear-engine stripped chassis produced for bus applications. For 1979, the model was replaced by the newer International S series "Schoolmaster".

== Design overview ==
=== Chassis ===
Models had vacuum assisted hydraulic drum brakes standard. Air over hydraulic and full air brakes were available. A driven front axle and tandem rear axles were available on some models. Loaded weights were from 18,200 to 30,200 pounds (8,300 to 13,700 kg) and up to 50,000 pounds (23,000 kg).

Most models were recognizable by their grey grill, curved fenders and "butterfly" hood. From the 1972 to 1978 model years, a squared-off, one-piece, fiberglass tilting hood was included as an option for school buses.

=== Engines ===
Gasoline and mid-range diesel engines were used. The butterfly hood of the Loadstar meant that V-8 engines fit better than straight-six engines. The tilting hood of the Loadstar fits both V-8 and straight-six engines.

The V-345 was the primary engine of the 1603 between 1962 and 1973, at the time when the model was discontinued. They are 304, 345, and 392 cubic inches (5.0, 5.7, and 6.4 L) overhead valve gasoline V8s. They developed 193, 197, and 236 horsepower (144, 147, and 176 kW) respectively.

The MV 404 was introduced for 1974. It was a 404 cubic inches (6.6 L) overhead valve gasoline V8 with a 4-barrel carburetor. It developed 210 horsepower (160 kW) and 366 pound force-feet (496 N⋅m) of torque. It became standard on the 1703 and 1803.

Mid-range diesels were International V8s up to 200 horsepower (150 kW), including the 1803 from 1974 to 1978.

Model	Max. front GAWR (Note: Gross axle weight rating is the loaded weight of the axle.)	Max. rear GAWR	Max. GVWR (Note: Gross vehicle weight rating is the loaded weight of the truck.)	Engine (Note: Highest rated engine for model.)	Trans
1603	7,500 lb (3,400 kg)	17,000 lb (7,700 kg)	24,500 lb (11,100 kg)	V-345	5 spd. (Note: A 4 spd. automatic was available.)
1703	9,000 lb (4,100 kg)	18,500 lb (8,400 kg)	27,500 lb (12,500 kg)	MV-404	4 spd.
1803	9,000 lb (4,100 kg)	21,200 lb (9,600 kg)	30,200 lb (13,700 kg)	MV-446	10 spd.
1853	9,000 lb (4,100 kg)	21,200 lb (9,600 kg)	30,200 lb (13,700 kg)	D-170	5 spd.

=== Driveline ===
Five- and four-speed manual transmissions were used both on the 1603 and the 1703. A 4-speed Allison automatic transmission was available on any school bus model. Diesel models were available with 5- and 10-speed Allison or Roadranger automatic or manual transmissions.

== Body manufacturers ==
Over its 16-year production, the Loadstar was bodied by many bus manufacturers, primarily for use as a school bus. After the 1977 federal safety standards came into effect, the Loadstar 1703/1803 "Schoolmaster" ended production in 1978, and was replaced by the S-Series for the 1979 model year.

International Loadstar bus chassis usage by school bus manufacturers, 1961–1978
Body manufacturer	Conventional (1603/1703/1803/1853)	Stripped (173/183 FC and 183/193 RE)
Blue Bird Body Company	Blue Bird Conventional (1961–1978)	
Carpenter Body Works, Inc.	Carpenter Classic (1961–1978)	Carpenter Corsair (1961–1978)
Gillig Brothers, Inc.	Gillig Coach (1961–1978)	
Northern Coach	Northern-Air (late 1970s?)	
Superior Coach Company	Superior Pioneer (1961–1978)	Superior SuperCruiser (1961–1978)
Thomas Built Buses, Inc.	Thomas Conventional (1961–1972); Thomas Saf-T-Liner Conventional (1972–1978)	Thomas Saf-T-Liner ER (1972–1977)
Ward School Bus Manufacturing, Inc.	Ward Conventional (1961–1973); Ward Volunteer (1973–1978)	Ward FC/RE (1961–c.1975)
Wayne Corporation	Wayne Conventional (1961–1973); Wayne Lifeguard (1973–1978)	Wayne RE (1961–1973)
Welles Corporation	Welles Conventional (1961–1973); Welles Lifeguard (1973–1978)	
