= Farnum's Gate Historic District =

Historic district in Massachusetts, United States

- U.S. National Register of Historic Places
- U.S. Historic district
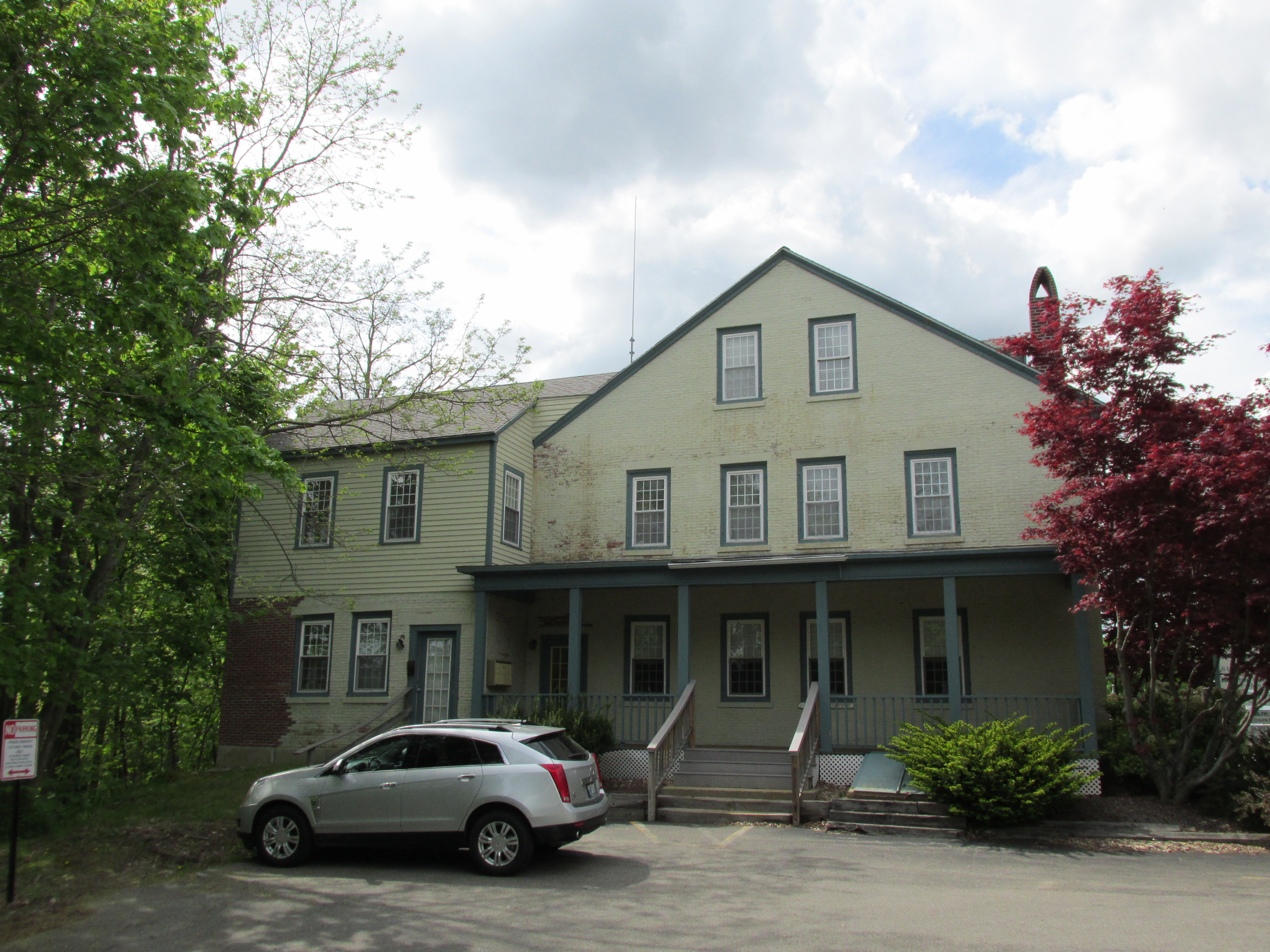
- Farnum Professional Building, also known as the Welcome Farnum House

- Location within Massachusetts Location within the United States
- Location: Blackstone, Massachusetts
- Coordinates: 42°1′8″N 71°31′56″W
- Area: 9.6 acres (3.9 ha)
- Architectural style: Federal, Greek Revival, Colonial Revival
- NRHP reference No.: 95001039
- Added to NRHP: August 25, 1995

The Farnum's Gate Historic District is a historic district encompassing a neighborhood of Blackstone, Massachusetts, associated with the locally prominent Farnum family. The area, on Main Street roughly between Austin Street and the St. Paul's Bridge, includes a number of homes built in the 1840s by prominent local industrialists, during a period of prosperity in the Blackstone River valley. The district was added to the National Register of Historic Places in 1995.

== Description and history ==
The Farnum's Gate Historic District is linear in nature, extending along Main Street (Massachusetts Route 122), with its western end roughly midway between its two junctions with Austin Street, and its eastern end a few houses east of the St. Paul Bridge, which spans the Blackstone River. Standing just west of the bridge is the 1835 Welcome Farnum House, a large Federal style structure that now houses professional offices. The district's name is derived from Farnum, whose family owned and developed land in the area, and the bridge, which was the gate by which the Farnums reached their mills on the opposite side of the river. Across Main Street stands the house of Welcome's brother Moses, a Greek Revival house with a Greek Revival entry porch. To its right stands the Queen Anne Victorian house of Joseph Southwick, with the Greek temple-fronted Estus Lamb House beyond. The only non-residential buildings in the district are the Federated Church (1928 brick Gothic Revival), and the former Blackstone High School (1920), now housing the public library.

Welcome and Darius Farnum arrived in this area (from their native Uxbridge in 1825, and established a textile mill on the south side of the river, and expanded their business along the river over the next ten years. Welcome Farnum was a dominating figure in the local economy, investing in the Blackstone Canal and the local railroad, as well as funding numerous civic improvements, including churches and schools. The cluster of houses located near the bridge were built and owned by either Farnum relatives or business associates, on land originally held by Welcome Farnum. Houses further to the west were typically owned by merchants and other local businessmen.

== See also ==
- National Register of Historic Places listings in Worcester County, Massachusetts
