= Matthew Dicks =

American writer

- Born: February 15, 1971 (age 55)
- Education: Manchester Community College; Trinity College; American InterContinental University
- Occupations: Writer; storyteller
- Spouse: Elysha Green
- Children: 2
- Website: matthewdicks.com

Matthew Dicks (born February 15, 1971) is an American writer and storyteller.

== Early life ==
Dicks was raised in the small town of Blackstone, Massachusetts. At age 16, he began working for McDonald's restaurants, and at 17, he was promoted to manager. On December 23, 1988, Dicks was in a head-on car accident. Upon arriving at the scene, paramedics found him without respiration or pulse and began CPR. He was ultimately revived before arriving at the hospital. This is one of two near death experiences to which Dicks credits much of his drive for success. Dicks left home at age 18 and continued working in the restaurant business, including McDonald's, for several years.

In 1993 Dicks was robbed at gunpoint while managing a McDonald's restaurant in Brockton, MA. The incident left him suffering from post traumatic stress disorder for more than a decade. Dicks attributes this incident as the impetus that sent him to college and launched his writing career.

== Career ==
Dicks has been working as an elementary school teacher at Henry A. Wolcott School in West Hartford, CT since 1999. He also owns and operates the Connecticut-based DJ company Jam Packed Dance Floor DJs. He has been entertaining at weddings since 1997. Dicks also works as a keynote speaker, marketing, storytelling, and communications consultant, and speaking coach. He is the owner of Storyworthy, a company that produces online instructional content. Dicks also works as a minister of the Universal Life Church.

=== Writing ===
His first novel, Something Missing, was published in 2009. He has since published Unexpectedly, Milo (2010), Memoirs of an Imaginary Friend (2012), The Perfect Comeback of Caroline Jacobs (2014), Twenty-one Truths About Love (2019), and The Other Mother (2020). He publishes in the UK under the pen name Matthew Green.

Dicks has also published three books of nonfiction: Storyworthy: Engage, Teach, Persuade, and Change Your Life Through the Power of Storytelling (2018), Someday Is Today: 22 Simple, Actionable Ways to Propel Your Creative Life (2022), and Stories Sell: Storyworthy Strategies to Grow Your Business and Brand.

Dicks is the humor columnist for Seasons magazine. His work has also appeared in the Hartford Courant, Reader's Digest, Parents magazine and The Christian Science Monitor.

=== Storytelling ===
Dicks began competing in live storytelling events in New York City 2011. He is a frequent participant in The Moth in New York City, Boston and other American cities. He has also told stories for This American Life, The Story Collider, Literary Death Match, The Liar Show, and more. He is a record 64-time Moth StorySLAM winner and 10-time GrandSLAM champion. His stories have been featured multiple times on The Moth podcast and The Moth Radio Hour.

In 2013, Dicks and his wife, Elysha Dicks, established Speak Up, a Hartford-Based storytelling organization producing storytelling shows throughout Connecticut.

=== Awards ===
In 2005 he was named the West Hartford Teacher of the Year and was named as one of three finalists for Connecticut's Teacher of the Year.

Dicks's third novel, Memoirs of an Imaginary Friend, won the 2014 Dolly Gray Award for Children's Literature.

== Books ==
Novels

- Something Missing (Doubleday, 2009) ISBN 978-0-7679-3088-8
- Unexpectedly Milo (Doubleday, 2010) ISBN 978-0-307-59230-9
- Memoirs of an Imaginary Friend (St. Martin's Press, 2012) ISBN 978-1-250-03185-3
- The Perfect Comeback of Caroline Jacobs (St. Martin's Press, 2015) ISBN 1-250-11635-X
- Twenty-one Truths About Love (St. Martin's Press, 2019) ISBN 1-250-78293-7
- The Other Mother (St. Martin's Press, 2021) ISBN 978-1-250-10346-8

Nonfiction

- Storyworthy: Engage, Teach, Persuade, and Change Your Life Through the Power of Storytelling (New World Library, 2018) ISBN 978-1-60868-548-6
- Someday Is Today: 22 Simple, Actionable Ways to Promote Your Creative Life (New World Library, 2022) ISBN 978-1-60868-750-3
- Stories Sell: Storyworthy Strategies to Grow Your Business and Brand (New World Library, 2024) ISBN 978-1608689040

== Personal life ==
Dicks is married to fellow teacher Elysha Green. They have two children.
