= Gilbert Thompson =

American topographer and soldier (1839–1909)

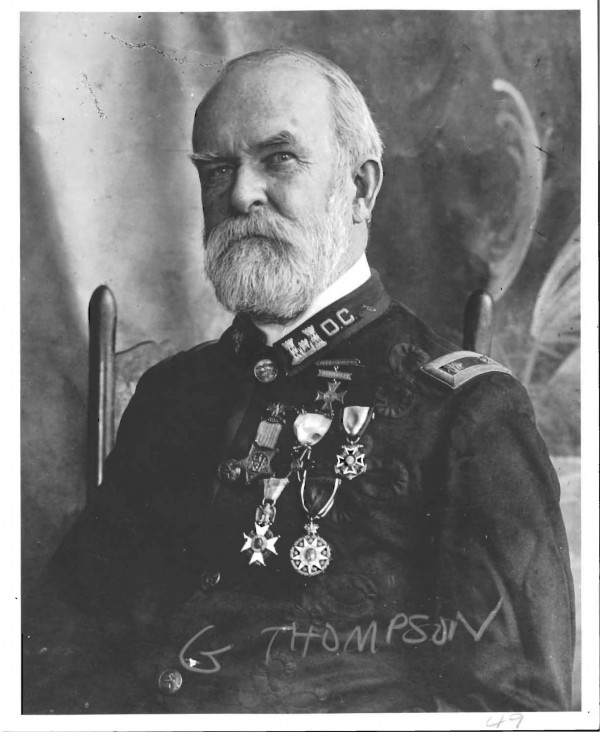
- Born: March 21, 1839; Blackstone, Massachusetts
- Died: June 8, 1909 (aged 70); Washington, D.C.
- Resting place: Arlington National Cemetery
- Occupations: Soldier, draftsman and topographer
- Employer(s): Union Army, U.S. Geological Survey
- Known for: Participating in the Wheeler Survey, Co-founding the National Geographic Society

Gilbert Thompson (21 March 1839 – 8 June 1909) was an American typographer, draftsman, topographer, and soldier.

== Biography ==
=== Early life and Civil War ===
Thompson was born on March 21, 1839, in Blackstone, Massachusetts. His father had helped combat the Dorr Rebellion in neighboring Rhode Island, and his great-grandmother was Deborah Sampson. At age ten his parents moved to the Utopian community of Hopedale, Massachusetts. In Hopedale, he trained to become a printer, and his first job was as a printer's assistant in a newspaper influenced by Adin Ballou. In 1861, he left for Boston, where he enlisted in the Union Army to fight in the American Civil War. The enlistment clerk wrote his profession as painter rather than printer when he signed up. This caused him to be changed from being an infantryman to becoming a combat engineer. He joined as a private in 1862 and became a corporal in the Regular Battalion of Engineers, serving until May 1865.

=== Wheeler Survey ===
After the war, Thompson went to Washington, D.C., where he became associated with the U.S. Geological Survey. In 1872, he joined the Wheeler Survey, under Lieutenant George Wheeler. He would stay on the Wheeler survey for the next seven years, making friends with the likes of Henry Wetherbee Henshaw, Rogers Birnie, and William Henry Rideing. In 1875, he led an expedition to Spirit Mountain in Nevada, of which he did the first topographical sketch. In 1879, he went into the Great Basin with Grove Karl Gilbert and John Wesley Powell.

=== After the Wheeler Survey ===
In 1884, Thompson was made head of the Appalachian division of the U.S. Geological Survey. In 1888, he co-founded the National Geographic Society, and in 1889, provided the first map supplement for the National Geographic Magazine; "North Carolina-Tennessee-Asheville Sheet".

He was also involved in the Grand Army of the Republic, Sons of the American Revolution, General Society of the War of 1812 and the Society of Colonial Wars. He also studied genealogy, finding connections between himself and Sir Humphrey Gilbert as well as Myles Standish, and was an antiquarian.

=== Army Corps of Engineers ===
As a major, he served in the Corps of Engineers from 1890 to 1898 at the District of Columbia National Guard.

=== Death ===
Major Gilbert Thompson died on June 8, 1909. He is buried at Arlington National Cemetery.
