= Thomas Built Buses =

American bus manufacturer

Thomas Built Buses, Inc.
- Formerly: Perley A. Thomas Car Works
- Type: Subsidiary
- Industry: Bus manufacturing
- Founded: 1916 (as Perley A. Thomas Car Works); 1972 (as Thomas Built Buses)
- Founder: Perley A. Thomas
- Headquarters: 1408 Courtesy Road, High Point, North Carolina, U.S.
- Area served: North America
- Key people: T.J. Reed (President, CEO); John W. Thomas III (President, 1992–2002)
- Products: School buses Commercial buses Specialty vehicles
- Production output: 15,000 vehicles/year
- Owner: Daimler Truck
- Number of employees: 1,600
- Parent: Daimler Truck North America
- Website: www.thomasbuiltbuses.com

Thomas Built Buses, Inc. (commonly shortened to Thomas) is an American bus manufacturer. Headquartered in High Point, North Carolina, Thomas has been a subsidiary of Daimler Trucks North America (the parent company of Freightliner) since 1998. Best known for its production of yellow school buses, Thomas produces other bus designs for a variety of usages.

Founded in 1916 as Perley A. Thomas Car Works, the company was renamed in 1972 to better represent its primary product lines. Prior to its acquisition, the company was operated by the Perley A. Thomas family, the final major school bus manufacturer operated under family control.

Since 1936, Thomas has produced school buses in High Point, North Carolina. In addition to bus bodies, the company also produces vehicle chassis for its Saf-T-Liner/Transit Liner EFX2 and HDX2 buses. Currently, its production is concentrated on school buses and activity buses, along with their commercial derivatives.

== History ==
=== Foundation ===
The oldest surviving school bus manufacturer in North America, Thomas Built Buses traces its roots to 1916. Following the closure of streetcar manufacturer Southern Car Company, Perley A. Thomas (trained as a woodworker and engineer) founded a company specializing in fireplace mantels and home furnishings. In the summer of 1916, Thomas shifted from furniture to streetcar construction, as he secured a contract to enclose existing streetcars in Charlotte, North Carolina, renovating them in a car barn.

In the summer of 1916, Thomas Car Works was founded; with a $6,000 loan ($138,459 in 2018), Thomas acquired the equipment of Southern Car Works at an auction, opening an assembly facility in a former ice manufacturing plant in High Point. During 1917, the company renovated 9 streetcars for the United States Navy in Mobile, Alabama, and for the city of Montgomery, Alabama.

1918 marked several milestones for the company, as Thomas Car Works began the production of brand-new streetcars; 25 were produced. All-steel bodies were produced by the company for the first time, quickly overtaking wooden designs. At the end of 1918, the company began the construction on a larger factory, a 30-acre facility outside of High Point allowing for both construction and repair of streetcars.

=== 1920s ===
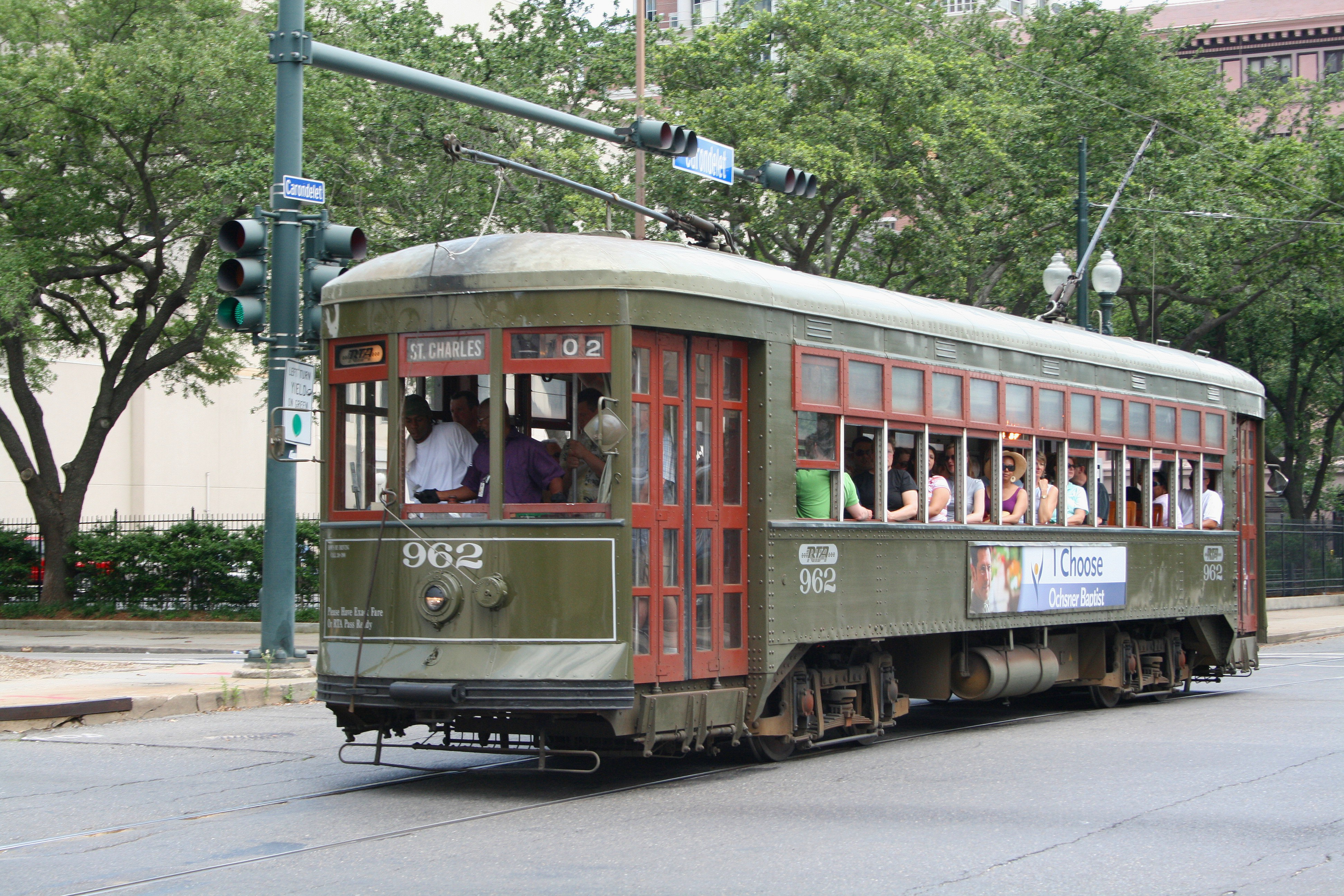
Perley A. Thomas 900-Series streetcar in New Orleans (built 1923–1924)

While best known from their use in New Orleans, Perley Thomas streetcars produced during the 1920s would also be utilized by communities across the United States, including Charlotte, NC; Chicago, IL; Detroit, MI; Miami, FL; Mobile, AL; New York City; Philadelphia, PA; Washington, DC, and exported as well, with Havana, Cuba as a user.

In total, Thomas Car Works produced approximately 400 streetcars from 1918 to 1930; at its peak, the company was the fourth-largest manufacturer of streetcars in the United States.

==== New Orleans streetcars ====
In 1921, Thomas Car Works secured its largest order for streetcars. In New Orleans, NOPSI (New Orleans Public Service, Inc.) decided to standardize their streetcar fleet upon 150 Thomas-designed streetcars, delivered from 1921 to 1924. Unable to fill the massive order on their own, Thomas subcontracted a portion to Philadelphia-based competitor J. G. Brill (using the Thomas design).

In September 1922, after Thomas delivered 25 streetcars to NOPSI, the High Point factory was destroyed by fire, causing $225,000 in damage and destroying 14 streetcars under construction. Following the fire, Perley Thomas secured a $100,000 advance from NOPSI, rebuilding the factory and securing parts to build 55 more streetcars; 25 more were completed by the end of 1923 (bringing the total produced to 105).

As of 2020, the New Orleans Regional Transit Authority operates 35 Perley Thomas 900-series streetcars in active daily use (on the St. Charles line, the oldest streetcar line in the world); the streetcars date from 1923 and 1924.

=== 1930s ===
In 1930, Thomas Car Works was reincorporated as a stock company, with Perley Thomas making his family stockholders in Perley A. Thomas Car Works, Inc. For the last time, the company received an order for streetcars, producing 4 for Mobile, Alabama. While rail-based streetcars offered higher capacity, for public transit, automotive-based buses grew in popularity as they offered a greater degree of routing flexibility. In a transition away from streetcars, Perley Thomas produced its first trolley bus in 1933; while still drawing power from overhead wires, a trolley bus was constructed from a bus chassis; the company ultimately built a total of only two trolley buses, for Greensboro, North Carolina. For 1934, the company produced 10 transit buses for South Carolina-based Duke Power.

Following the collapse of its primary source of revenue, Thomas Car Works diversified its work, expanding into automotive refinishing and construction of bus and truck bodies. From 1929 to 1934, the company workforce decreased from 125 to nearly 10 (which included Perley Thomas and his 3 children). Eventually, a company creditor filed for receivership, with the lack of potential buyers allowing for the survival of the company.

==== Transition to bus construction ====
In 1936, Thomas Car Works secured part of a bid to produce 500 school bus bodies for North Carolina. As the company was only financially able to acquire materials for 200 bodies, North Carolina split the bid between Thomas and Hackney Brothers. Dependent on length, Thomas offered wood-bodied school buses for $195 to $225. Following the completion of its second school bus bid in 1937, the company focused nearly all production on school bus bodies. In what is a long tradition that continues to the present day, Thomas remains the primary supplier of school buses to North Carolina.

In 1938, several major innovations were introduced by the company to its school bus design, including its first steel-bodied school bus. While Perley Thomas streetcars had adopted steel construction in 1918, school bus design had slowly evolved from farm wagons, with wooden body construction continuing into the 1930s. Although not the first to construct an all-steel body, Thomas introduced one-piece roof bows, internal roll bars welded to each side of the floor/frame structure. While the design has been updated for added strength, the one-piece roof bow is in use in all school buses manufactured in North America today. In another innovation, Thomas introduced an outward-opening entry door, designed to aid egress in emergency evacuation situations.

=== 1940s ===
In 1940, day-to-day operation of Thomas Car Works was turned over from Perley Thomas (who remained company president) to his three children. John W. Thomas managed company operations along with sales, along with James Thomas handling the High Point factory. Following the outbreak of World War II, as with its competitors, Thomas bus production was shifted towards the armed forces. In a contract shared with Ward Body Works, Thomas also produced various bodies for the GMC CCKW truck.

While the war had brought school bus production to a halt, the High Point factory remained utilized in civilian capacity. To supplement its armed forces production, Thomas Car Works was put to use by refurbishing streetcars. As rationing had placed increased demands on public transportation, the upkeep of existing equipment was considered a priority.

Following World War II, with a rise in student populations, Thomas Car Works began to expand its sales market beyond the South, opening dealerships across the eastern half of the United States. To better weatherproof its entry door, the company developed a reinforced rubber-covered door hinge; the rubber also covered the gap between the two door panels as they closed.

After World War II, a third generation of the family joined the company, with John W. Thomas Jr. and Perley (Pat) Thomas II, with the former becoming director of sales and the latter taking over control of government contracts.

=== 1950s ===
During the decade, Thomas Car Works began exports of its product lines, establishing satellite facilities in Ecuador and Peru. From North Carolina, bodies were shipped to South America in CKD form for final assembly on locally sourced chassis.

In 1957, the Thomas Saf-T-Liner name made its first appearance, denoting updated bus bodies (with an enlarged two-piece windshield). Used full-time by 1972, the name remains in use for all full-size Thomas buses over 60 years later.

Company founder Perley Thomas died in 1958 at the age of 84; at the time of his death, Thomas retained his title of company president and also actively served as a design consultant.

=== 1960s ===
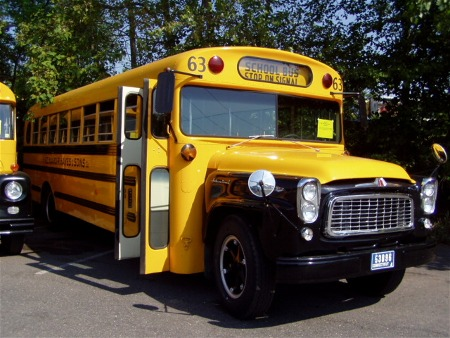
1961 Thomas school bus on an International Harvester chassis

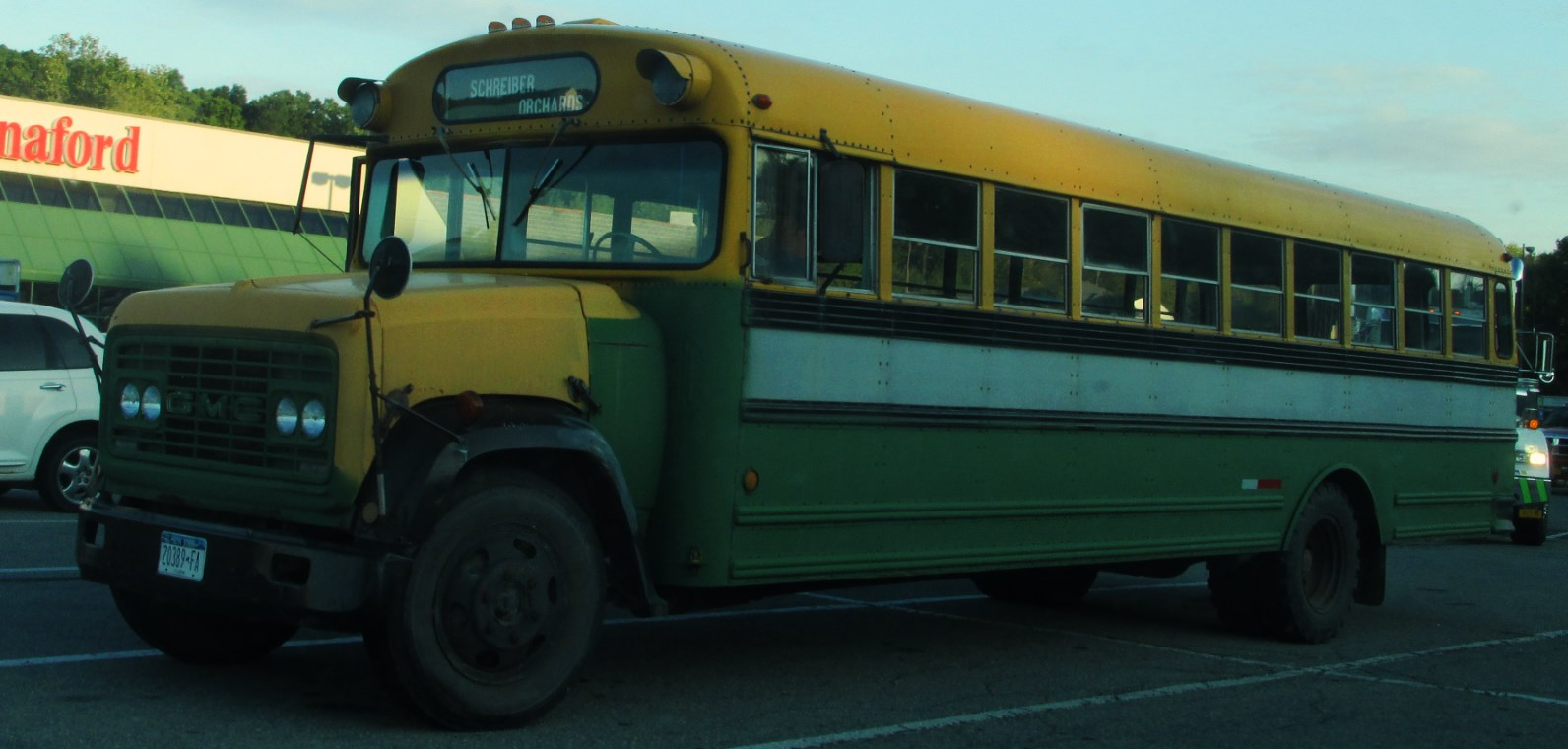
Late-1960s Thomas Saf-T-Liner body on GMC H6500 chassis (rare) in New York as a farm bus

In 1962, Thomas Car Works officially expanded its production beyond High Point as Thomas Built Buses of Canada, Ltd. was established in Woodstock, Ontario. At the time, the company became the third-largest producer of school buses in the United States.

To demonstrate the strength of its internal roof bows, Thomas stacked a full-size school bus on the roof of another (using a crane) in 1964; the company has subsequently repeated the demonstration several times using more recent product lines.

For 1967, to reduce blind spots in front of the bus, Thomas developed a convex blind-spot mirror. Initially mandated in North Carolina, the device (allowing a 150-degree field of vision directly in front of the bus) would be adopted by 16 other states in only two years. In various forms, blind-spot mirrors are currently required on all school buses in North America.

=== 1970s ===
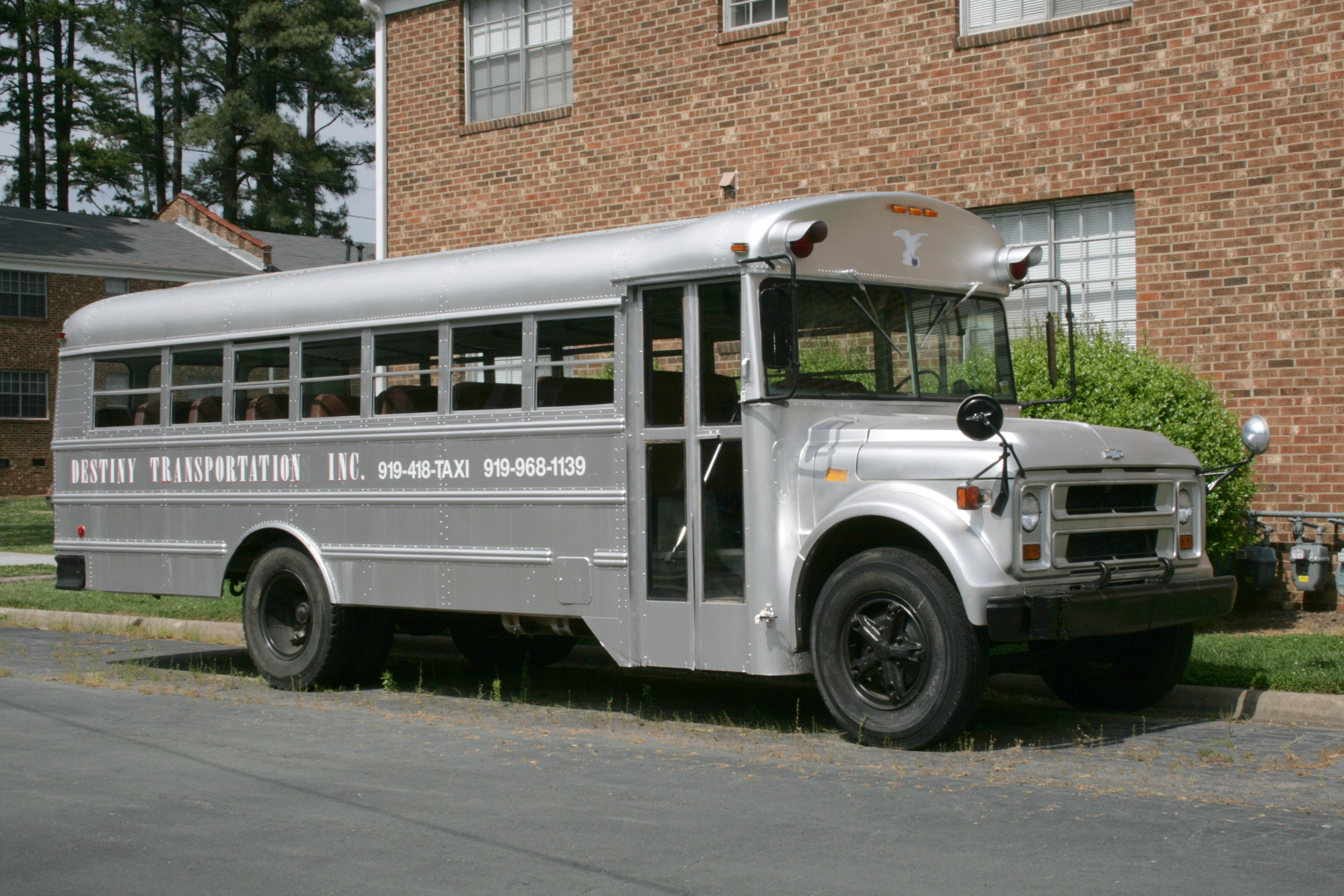
1977–1983 Thomas Saf-T-Liner Conventional on Chevrolet chassis in North Carolina (retired)

In the early 1970s, Thomas underwent a number of major transitions in company leadership and market positioning. Company president John W. Thomas died in 1972, giving leadership to his brother James Thomas, who retired within a year. A third generation of the Thomas family assumed control of the company leadership, with John Thomas Jr. (President) and Perley Thomas II (VP, international operations).

As Thomas Car Works had ended its involvement with streetcars since World War II, the new generation of company leaders chose a new name for the company tied closer to its current product lines; in 1972, Perley A. Thomas Car Works was renamed Thomas Built Buses, Inc (used in its emblems and marketing material since the 1950s).

==== Expanded school buses ====
Since producing its first school bus in 1936, virtually all Thomas school bus bodies had been produced in the "conventional" style: a body mated to a cowled truck chassis. While the design was the most popular configuration, the transit-style configuration allowed for a higher passenger capacity (up to 90 passengers). In the early 1970s, Thomas developed the Saf-T-Liner ER (Engine Rear) as an alternative to the Blue Bird All American. In line with other body manufacturers (Carpenter, Superior, Ward, and Wayne), Thomas was dependent on a second-party manufacturer for rear-engine chassis (using Ford, Dodge, GMC, International Harvester and Volvo).

In the early 1970s Thomas Built Buses introduced the first of its "Mighty Mite" series of buses and were the smallest conventional bus ever produced by Thomas. Most were built on Dodge D300 chassis but when production of this series ended at the main plant in High Point, NC, production was moved to Woodstock, Ontario and the Canadian built Mighty Mites used modified International Loadstar chassis.

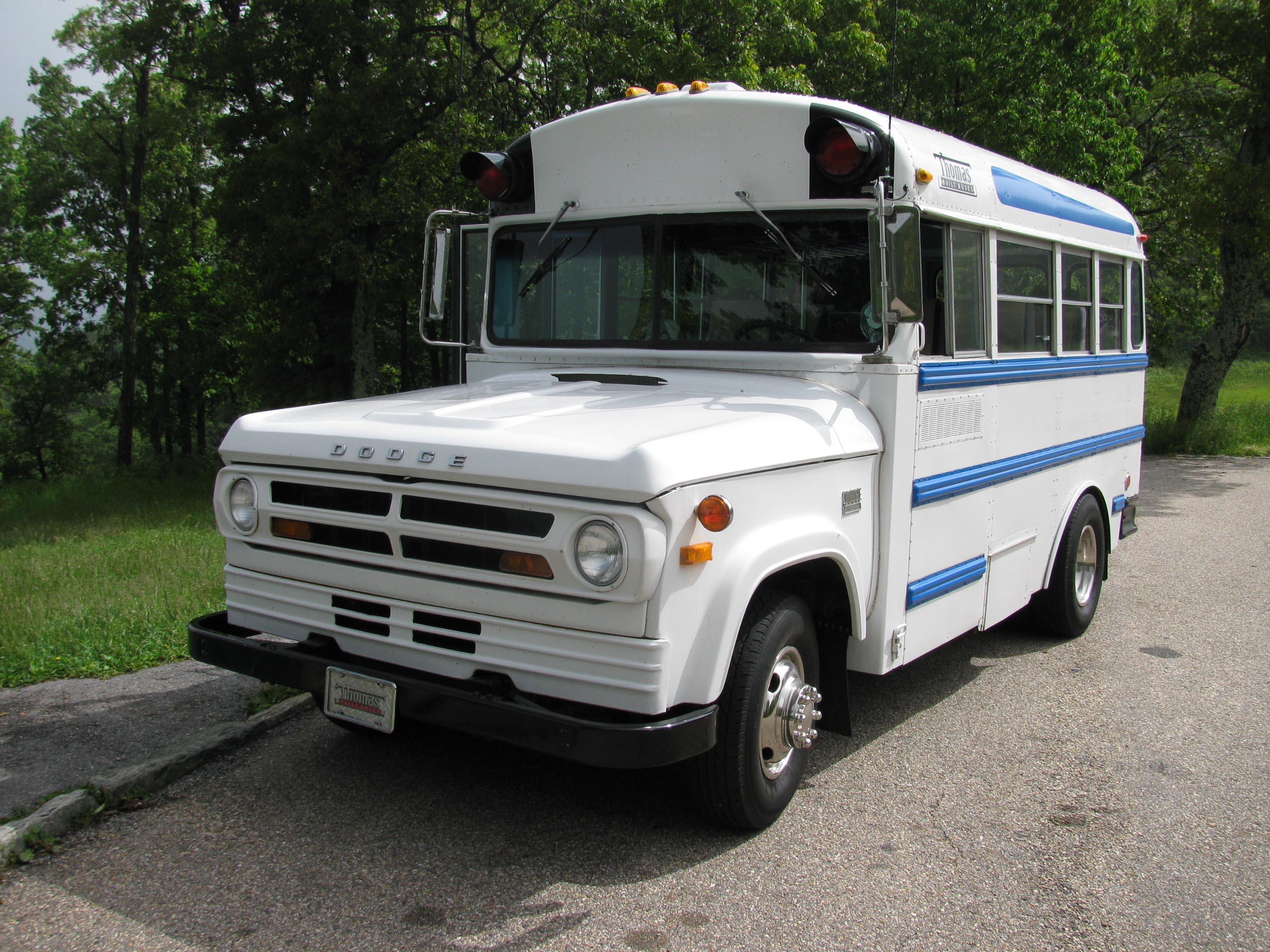
1971 Thomas Mighty Mite on Dodge S-Series chassis.

For 1972, the Saf-T-Liner body underwent a major redesign. Along with extending the rub rails completely around the body, the front and rear roof caps were flattened (to accommodate 8-lamp warning systems), and the windshield was enlarged. Following the addition of safety upgrades to comply with safety mandates in 1977, the Saf-T-Liner body saw use in the Conventional through the end of 2006; in modified form, it remains in use with the EFX and HDX (and resized to fit the Minotour). At the smaller end of the size scale, the Saf-T-Liner body was resized to produce the Mighty Mite, a narrow-body school bus on a shorter-wheelbase conventional chassis.

In 1977, Thomas made a major change to the production of the Saf-T-Liner ER. Coinciding with a design update, Thomas introduced a company-sourced chassis, along with the front-engine Saf-T-Liner EF. With the introduction of the EF, Thomas became the first school bus manufacturer to produce its own chassis for both front and rear-engine school buses, ahead of Blue Bird by a decade (California manufacturers Crown Coach and Gillig Corporation had not produced a front-engine school bus since before World War II). As a competitor to the Blue Bird Mini Bird and Carpenter Cadet, Thomas reintroduced the Mighty Mite as a Type B bus, a school bus body paired with a stripped chassis.

=== 1980s ===
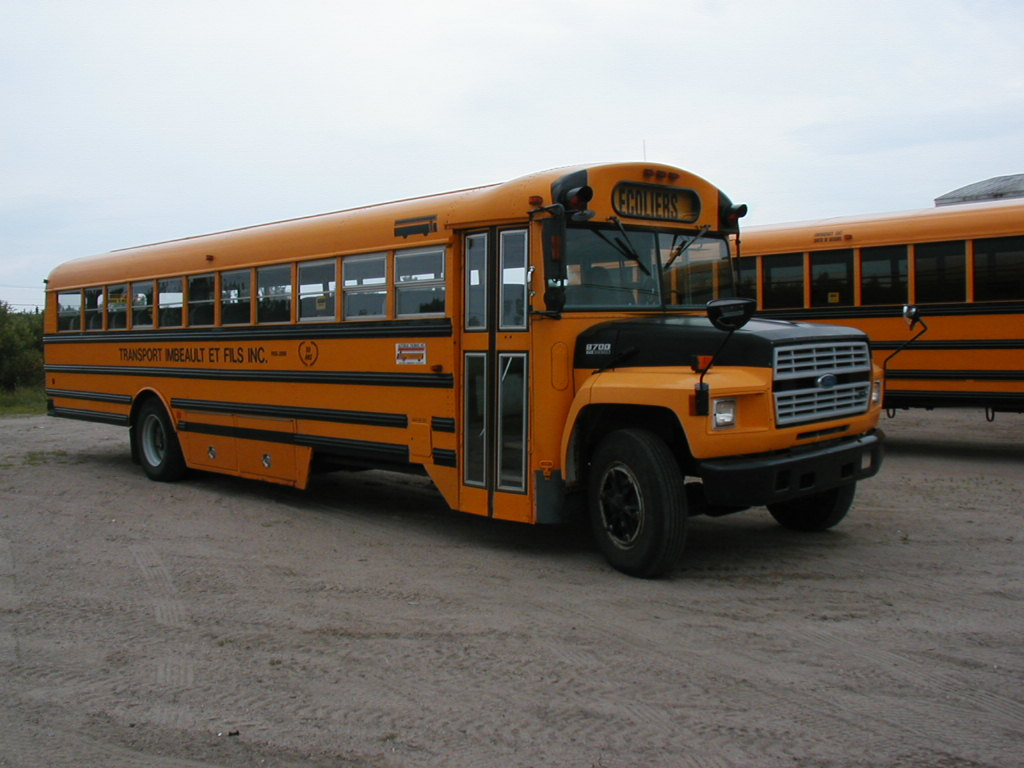
Thomas Saf-T-Liner Conventional with late-1980s Ford B700 chassis (Quebec)

The late 1970s and early 1980s was a period of struggle for all school bus manufacturers. Coupled with the slow economy, manufacturers could no longer count on the factor that had driven school bus sales for the past two decades: the entirety of the baby-boom generation had graduated high school; it would be years before student populations would create sufficient demand again. During this time, a number of manufacturers either encountered financial difficulty or closed their doors altogether.

At the beginning of the decade, Thomas introduced a new logo, displayed on the roofline of its buses; a "T-bus" logo replaced the previous scripted "Thomas Built Buses" company logo (still attached elsewhere to the body).

To better secure the future of the company, the Thomas family sought to raise capital for Thomas Built Buses, leading the company board to bring in the Odyssey Group investment firm to oversee the process. In return, Odyssey Group received a stake in the company (remaining under full family control).

In the early 1980s, Thomas launched a diversification of its product line, expanding its presence in the transit bus segment. Derived from the Saf-T-Liner, the Transit Liner was developed for commercial use. In 1982, the CL960 "Citiliner" was introduced as a dedicated transit bus; while sharing its underpinnings with the Saf-T-Liner ER, the two-door CitiLiner was rebodied (with a sloped windshield). Sharing its body with the CL960, the Chartour was developed for charter use, using a single entry door.

==== Product innovations ====
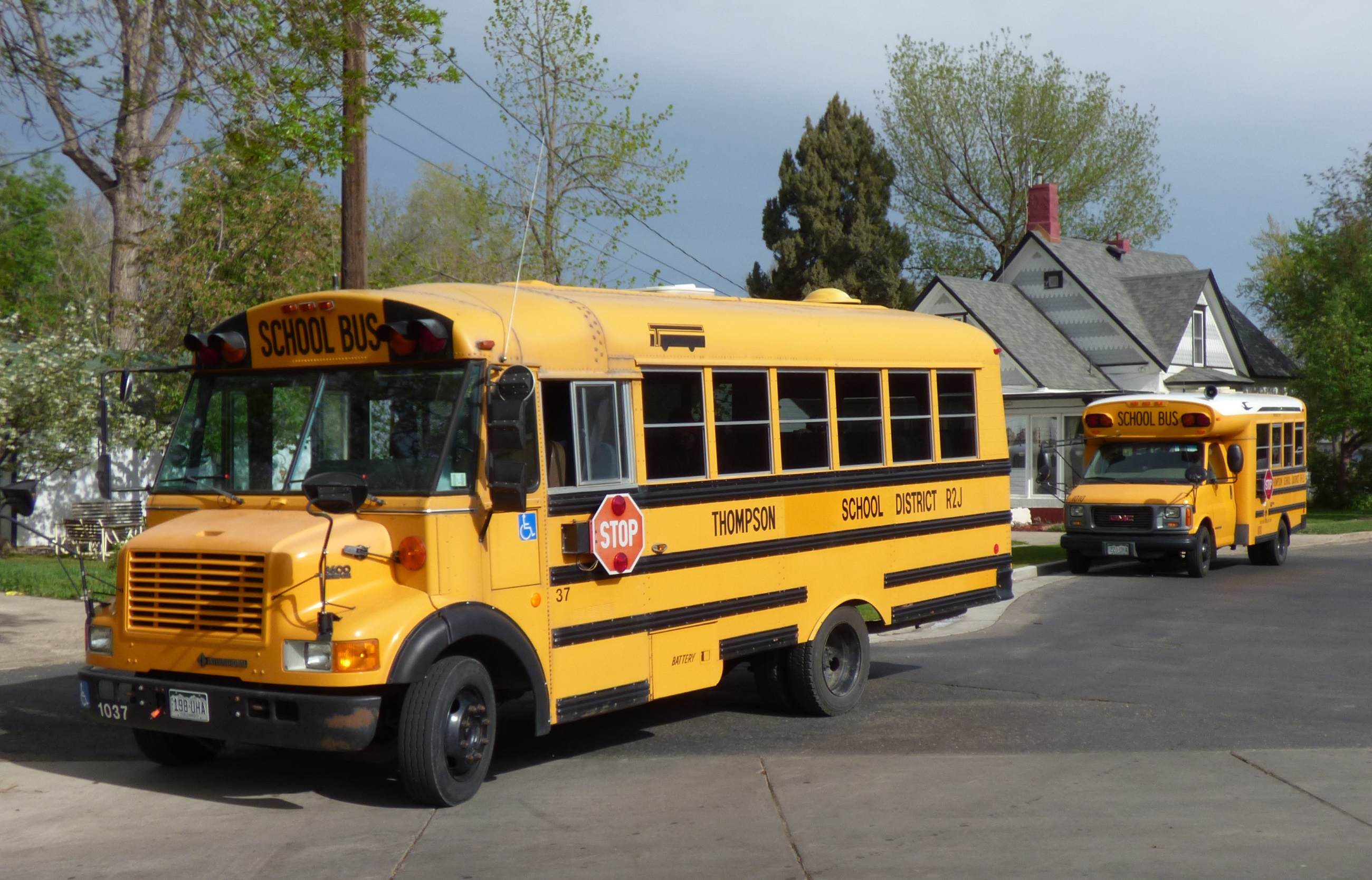
1995 Thomas Vista (International 3600) in Colorado with wheelchair lift and flat floor

Following the mid-1970s launches of the Wayne Busette and Blue Bird Micro Bird, Thomas would launch its own cutaway-chassis school bus, the Thomas Minotour, in 1980. Alongside the small Minotour, Thomas introduced the WestCoastER, a heavy-duty variant of the Saf-T-Liner ER marketed against Crown Supercoach and Gillig Phantom school buses. Sold only in 84 and 90-passenger configurations, the WestCoastER used heavier-duty driveline and suspension components; tandem rear axles were offered as an option.

In 1989, Thomas introduced a second conventional-style bus to its model line, launching the Thomas Vista school bus. To optimize forward sightlines for drivers, the layout of the driver's compartment and forward chassis were redesigned. Along with a shorter hood and redesigned windshield, the engine and front axle were repositioned. In contrast to a standard conventional bus, the driver of the Vista sat beside the engine (rather than behind it).

=== 1990s ===
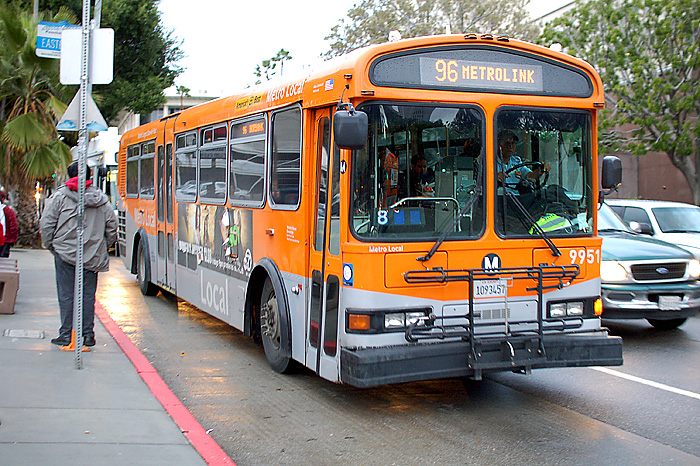
2001 Thomas TL960 of LACMTA

In 1991, the Saf-T-Liner transit-style buses saw their first redesign since 1977. The ER and WestCoastER were given a much larger windshield, redesigned driver's compartment, and saw the introduction of several new diesel engines. To better compete with the Blue Bird TC/2000 and Ward Senator (which became the AmTran Genesis), Thomas replaced the Saf-T-Liner EF with the All Star, using an Oshkosh-produced chassis. The Thomas Vista continued production, shifting chassis in 1991 from General Motors to a variant of Navistar chassis shared with the Saf-T-Liner Conventional.

In 1992, the fourth generation of the Thomas family took over daily operations of the company (becoming the first family-owned school bus company to do so).

During the mid-1990s, the company began development of environmentally cleaner buses, with compressed natural gas (CNG) school buses entering production in 1993; several battery-electric school buses were produced in 1994 as prototype vehicles.

By 1996, Thomas had become the largest school bus manufacturer in the United States (by market share). To keep up with added demand, the company opened a third factory in Monterrey, Mexico. As a design change, the "T-bus" roof emblem (used since the early 1980s) was replaced by a scripted Thomas Built Buses emblem (its predecessor).

During the later 1990s, Thomas Built Buses would undergo a number of significant changes, with some that have changed the future of school bus manufacturing. For the 1997 model year, Freightliner introduced the Freightliner FS-65 school bus chassis. Derived from the Freightliner FL60/FL70 medium-duty trucks introduced in 1995, the FS-65 chassis was paired with the Saf-T-Liner Conventional body, after several modifications (distinguished by the addition of a 4-piece windshield).

==== Transit expansion ====
During the 1990s, Thomas modernized and expanded its product range within the transit segment. Alongside the Chartour and CL960/Citiliner, Thomas marketed Transit Liners, commercial derivatives of the Saf-T-Liner school buses, along with commercial versions of the Minotour and Vista. A dedicated transit bus derived from the Saf-T-Liner ER, the TL960 was a two-door bus that offered an integrated wheelchair ramp as an option.

In 1999, Thomas entered a joint venture with British bus manufacturer Dennis to import the Dennis Dart SLF (in CKD form). Following assembly by Thomas in North Carolina; while badged as Thomas vehicles (the Thomas Dennis SLF200), distribution of the low-floor buses was undertaken by Orion Bus (itself becoming a Daimler subsidiary in 2000).

==== Company acquisition ====
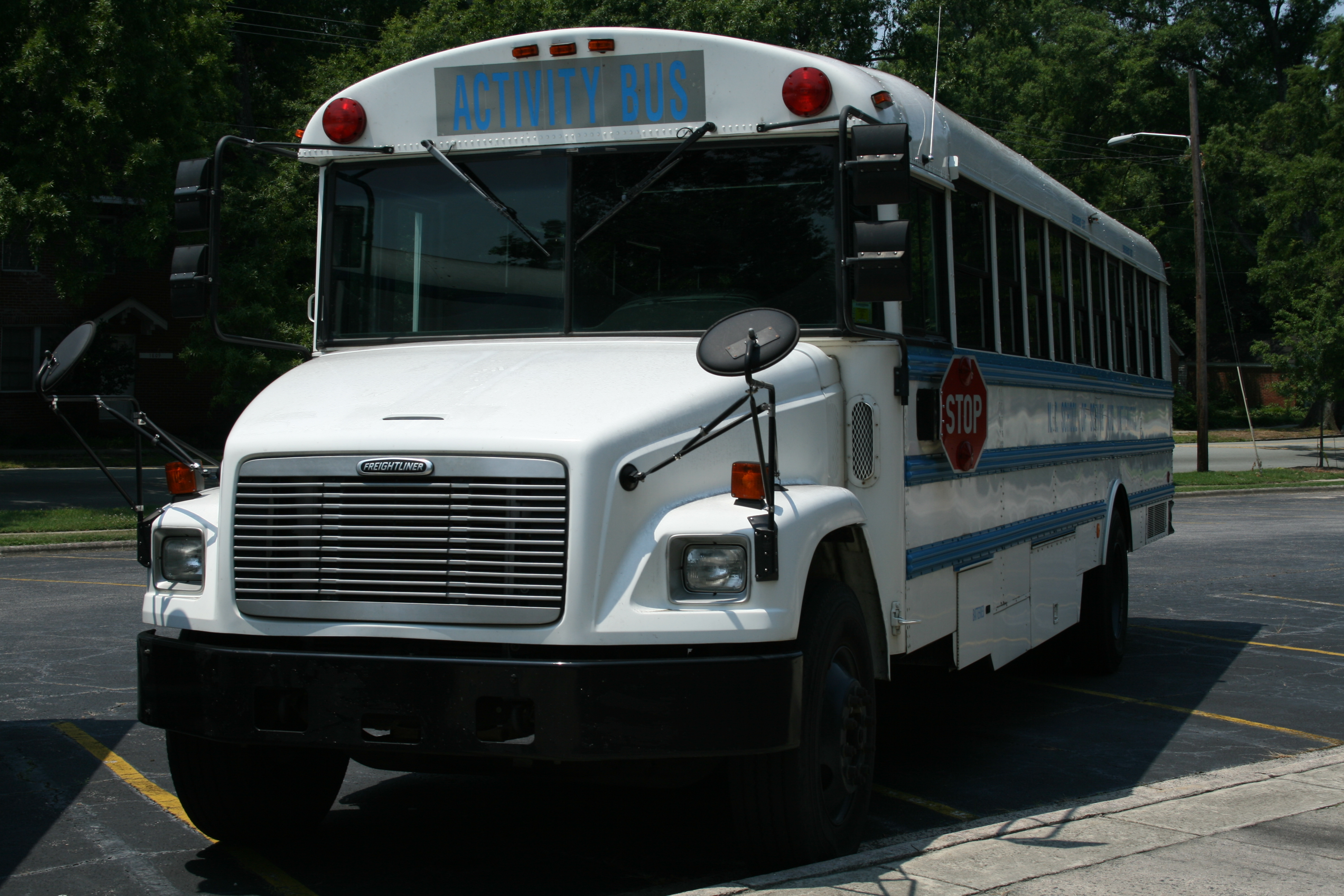
Thomas Saf-T-Liner FS-65 (North Carolina activity bus)

Into the late 1990s, Thomas Built Buses remained a family-owned company, controlled by the fourth generation of the Thomas family and the Odyssey Group. Following the departure of Wayne Wheeled Vehicles from the manufacturing segment, Thomas became the largest manufacturer, holding a 34% market share in 1996. The same year, the Thomas family sold a majority stake of the company to the Berkshire Partners equity firm.

Freightliner entered school bus manufacturing as a chassis producer in May 1996, unveiling the Freightliner FS-65 (derived from its FL60/FL70 Business Class medium-duty truck); developed in cooperation with Thomas, the first production Freightliner-chassis buses were produced at the beginning of 1997. The product launch marked the first completely new school bus chassis since 1980, with Freightliner becoming the first new cowled-chassis manufacturer since the 1977 withdrawal of Dodge.

Following its collaboration with Thomas in developing the FS-65 chassis, in October 1998, Freightliner acquired Thomas Built Buses in its entirety from the Thomas family and the Berkshire, retaining company president John W. Thomas III. The largest school bus manufacturer in North America at the time, Thomas Built Buses was the last major manufacturer operating under family control. At the time, Freightliner was undergoing a series of company acquisitions to diversify its product range beyond highway trucks. Along with acquiring the rights to the Ford heavy-truck line (and Ford Cargo) in 1997 (continued as Sterling Trucks), Freightliner acquired Thomas alongside the chassis production of Oshkosh Corporation (1995), American LaFrance (1996).

For school bus manufacturers, the 1990s marked a period of association between major body and chassis manufacturers. In 1991, Navistar began its purchase of AmTran (completed in 1995); a year later, Blue Bird entered in a supply agreement with General Motors for conventional bus chassis. 1998 marked both the purchase of Thomas by Freightliner and the sale of Carpenter to Spartan Motors (its front/rear-engine chassis supplier).

At the end of the 1990s, several changes made to the Thomas product line were related to its purchase by Freightliner. At the end of 1998 production, Navistar ended its chassis production for the Vista; as the Vista body was developed solely for its chassis, Thomas discontinued the model line. While Freightliner did not purchase the Ford medium-duty truck range or the school bus chassis derived from it, Ford ended production of the latter after 1998. Consequently, from 1999 onward, the Saf-T-Liner Conventional was limited to Navistar or Freightliner chassis (along with AmTran/Ward, Carpenter, and Wayne, the last General Motors chassis for a Thomas bus was produced in 1991).

=== 2000s ===
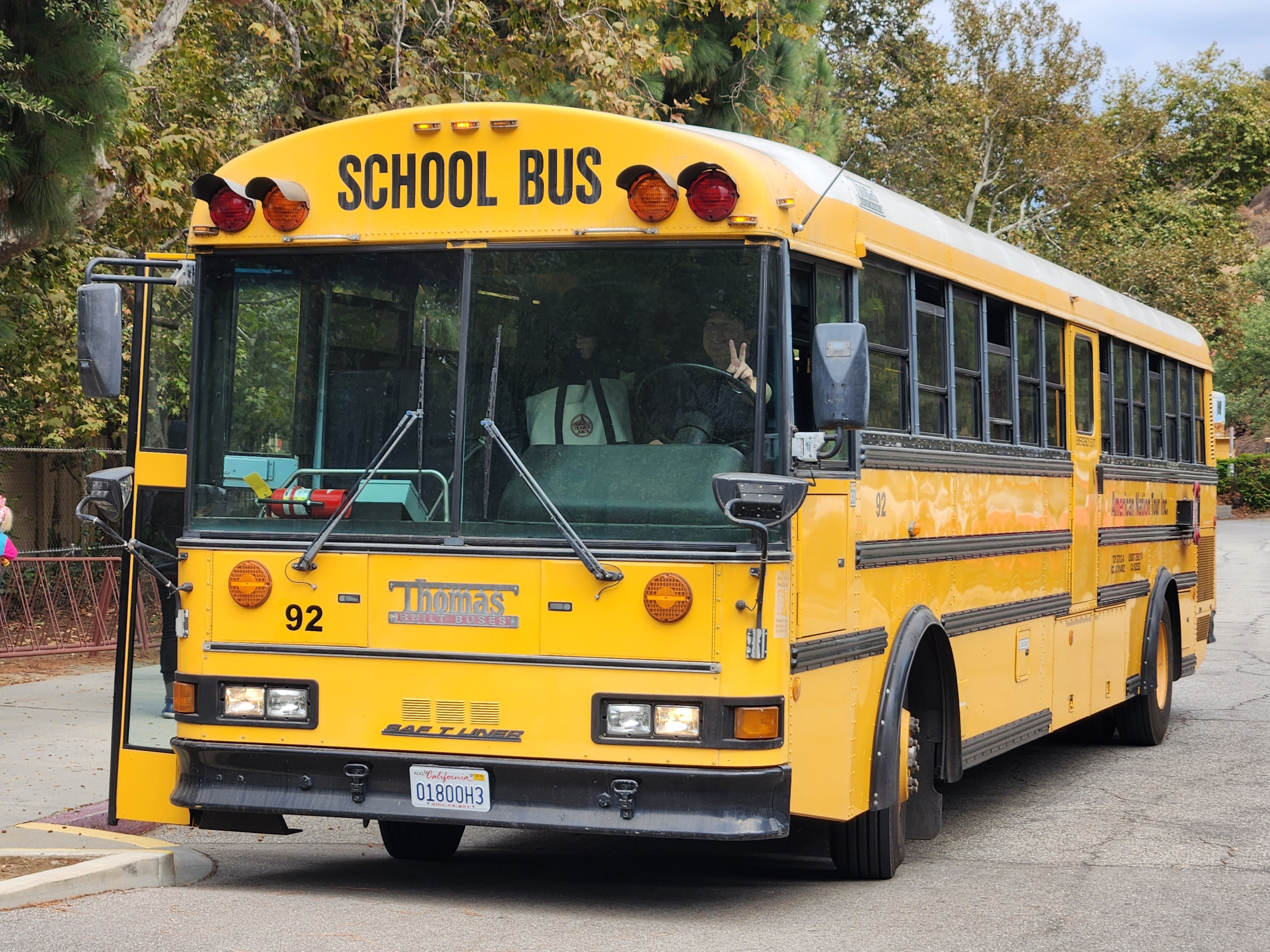
2003 Thomas Saf-T-Liner ER powered by CNG, has the rear end of a HDX.

In the school bus manufacturing segment, the beginning of the 2000s marked a period of uncertainty. In 2001, following the closure of Carpenter, the number of body manufacturers had declined from seven to three in ten years; AmTran would rebrand itself (twice, in less than two years). The acquisition of Thomas by Freightliner brought financial stability to the company (something not initially afforded to the Blue Bird Corporation).

In the early 2000s, Thomas restructured its manufacturing footprint, centering it around its High Point headquarters. Following the closure of the Monterrey facility in the late 1990s, the company opened a separate facility in High Point for Minotour assembly in 1999; in 2000, a facility was opened to produce Thomas Dennis low-floor buses in Jamestown, North Carolina. Thomas Built Buses of Canada in Woodstock, Ontario, was closed in late 2001 (as part of a Freightliner restructuring), with Thomas opening a third school bus assembly facility High Point in 2004.

In 2002, John W. Thomas III retired, becoming the final family member to manage the firm; serving as president since 1992, Thomas remained with the company as a consultant. He was succeeded by John O'Leary, a financially educated manager in charge of the turnaround of parent company Freightliner.

During the 2000s, Thomas began to wind down its presence in the transit bus segment. While the Thomas Dennis SLF200 found buyers, the product line struggled to gain a foothold against established transit buses; after 2002, the Thomas Dennis joint venture was reorganized by Daimler (effectively replacing Thomas with distributor Orion) and the SLF200 was discontinued when Dennis' successor Transbus International withdrew from the venture. The Thomas-designed TL960 (which replaced the aging Chartour/CL960) was discontinued in 2002, replacing dedicated transit buses with school bus derivatives as Thomas consolidated commercial production to the Transit Liner EF/ER.

In 2005, company founder Perley Thomas became one of the first inductees (posthumously) of the North Carolina Transportation Hall of Fame in Raleigh, North Carolina. In 2007, the North Carolina Transportation Museum received the donation of a 1940 Thomas Car Works school bus from Thomas Built Buses.

Following the 2004 introduction of the Saf-T-Liner C2, Thomas produced the model line along its Saf-T-Liner Conventional predecessor. After nearly 35 years of production of the Saf-T-Liner Conventional body; the 62,764th and final example on the FS-65 chassis was produced on December 13, 2006.

==== New-generation buses ====
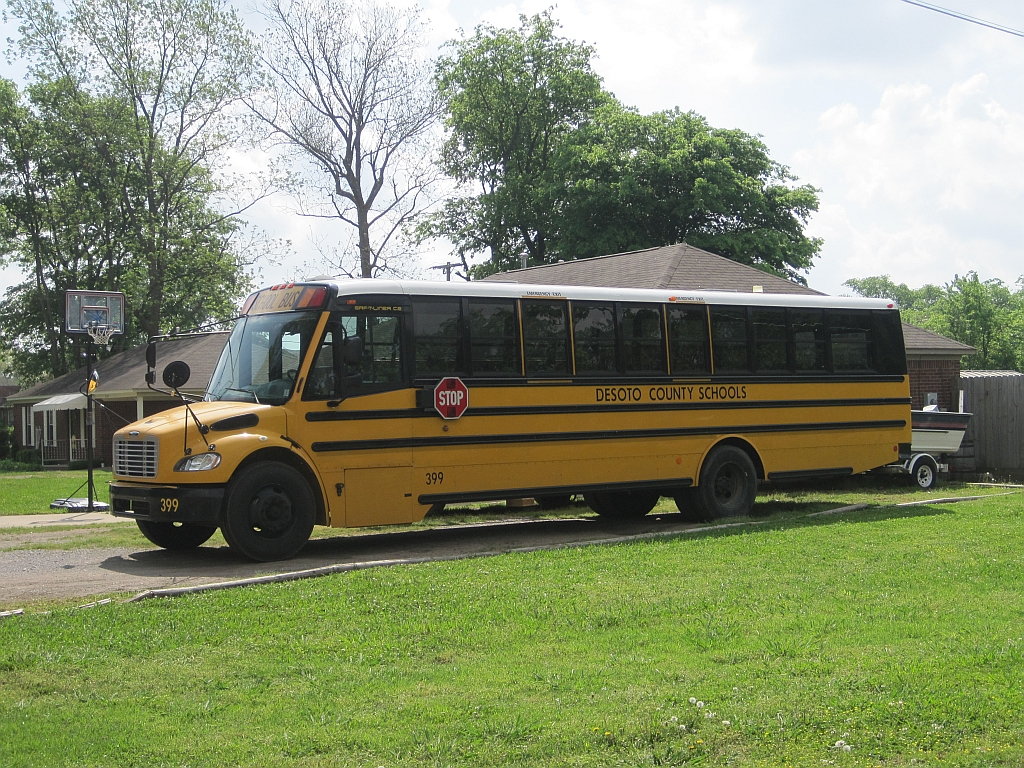
Thomas Saf-T-Liner C2 school bus in Mississippi

At the beginning of the 2000s, Thomas began to introduce its most extensive updates to its product lines since the 1970s. In 2000, the Saf-T-Liner HD was introduced (combining the Saf-T-Liner ER, WestCoastER, and the MVP ER). Distinguished by its large mirror housings (integrating sideview, convex, and crossview mirrors into a single assembly), the HD also visibly shared several components from Freightliner, including its instrument cluster and headlamps. In 2002, Thomas renamed the HD the Saf-T-Liner HDX. For 2003, Freightliner became the sole chassis supplier for the Saf-T-Liner Conventional, with all Conventionals becoming Saf-T-Liner FS-65s.

Following the 2002 replacement of the FL-series Business Class with the Business Class M2, development was underway on a new-generation Thomas Saf-T-Liner conventional school bus. In 2004, the Thomas Saf-T-Liner C2 made its debut, marking the first completely new bus body from Thomas since 1972. In a shift from industry precedent, both the Thomas body and Freightliner chassis were designed together as a common unit (allowing the use of the dashboard in nearly its entirety); as a drawback, the pairing negated the use of the Freightliner C2 chassis by other body builders. In contrast to the Saf-T-Liner Conventional, the C2 is designed with a larger, sloped windshield, larger windows and exits, and different body construction.

For 2009, Thomas launched a second model line of small buses. Named the Thomas MyBus, the model line is geared towards the MFSAB (activity bus) segment. Sharing its internal structure with the Minotour, the non-yellow MyBus is designed for applications without any need for traffic control.

=== 2010s ===
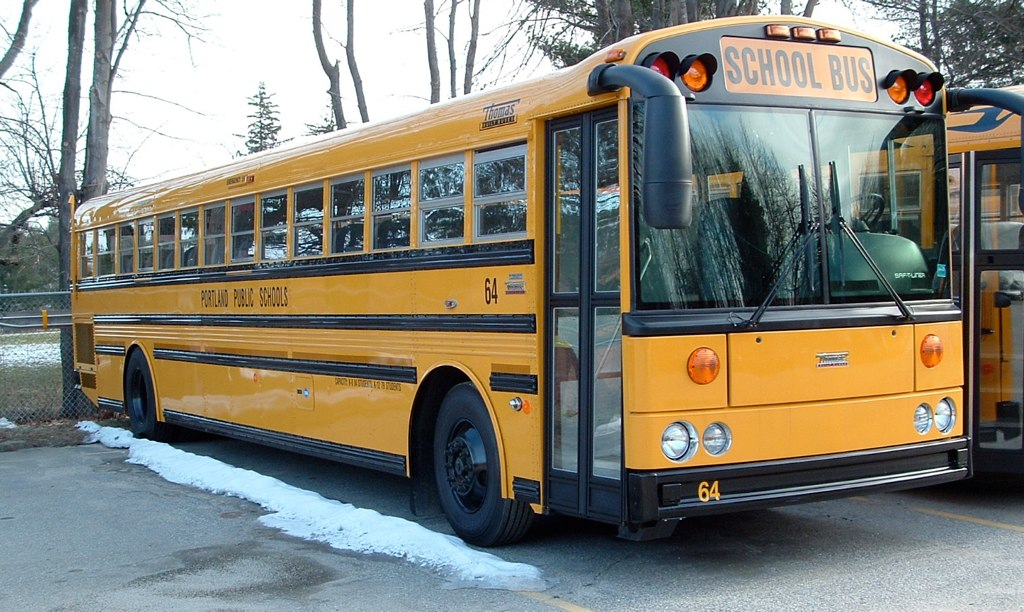
Thomas Saf-T-Liner HDX in Maine; bus is equipped with CNG fuel system

In 2010, John O'Leary was succeeded as company president by Kelley Platt; the first female leader of a major school bus manufacturer, Platt served as manager of treasury services during the Freightliner acquisition of Thomas Built Buses.

In the fall of 2011, Thomas unveiled the Saf-T-Liner EFX, its first all-new front-engine bus since 1994. Production of the EFX began in the spring of 2012. Using similar design features as the Saf-T-Liner HDX (its windshield and upper bodywork), the EFX also utilized a center-mounted Freightliner instrument panel.

During the early 2010s, Thomas expanded its environmentally friendly product line. The Saf-T-Liner C2e hybrid diesel-electric school bus (introduced in 2007) met with little success, leading to its withdrawal in 2013; instead, the company invested in its alternative-fuel product lines. Having offered compressed natural gas (CNG) since 1993 in the Saf-T-Liner ER, the Saf-T-Liner C2 gained propane and CNG offerings (in 2014 and 2016, respectively). Alternative fuels became available on the Minotour (coinciding with chassis specification).

In 2016, Thomas Built Buses marked 100 years since the founding of Perley Thomas Car Works, becoming the first current bus body manufacturer to reach 100 years of production in North America.

In 2018, Thomas Built Buses would introduce Detroit Diesel engines into their school buses, marking the first time that Detroit Diesel engines have been used in school buses since the late 80s.

In late 2019, Thomas entered into a joint venture with Trans Tech to jointly develop a small school bus. Named the Minotrek, The Ford Transit cutaway-chassis school bus is designed with an aerodynamically enhanced body to optimize fuel economy.

==== Environmental stewardship ====
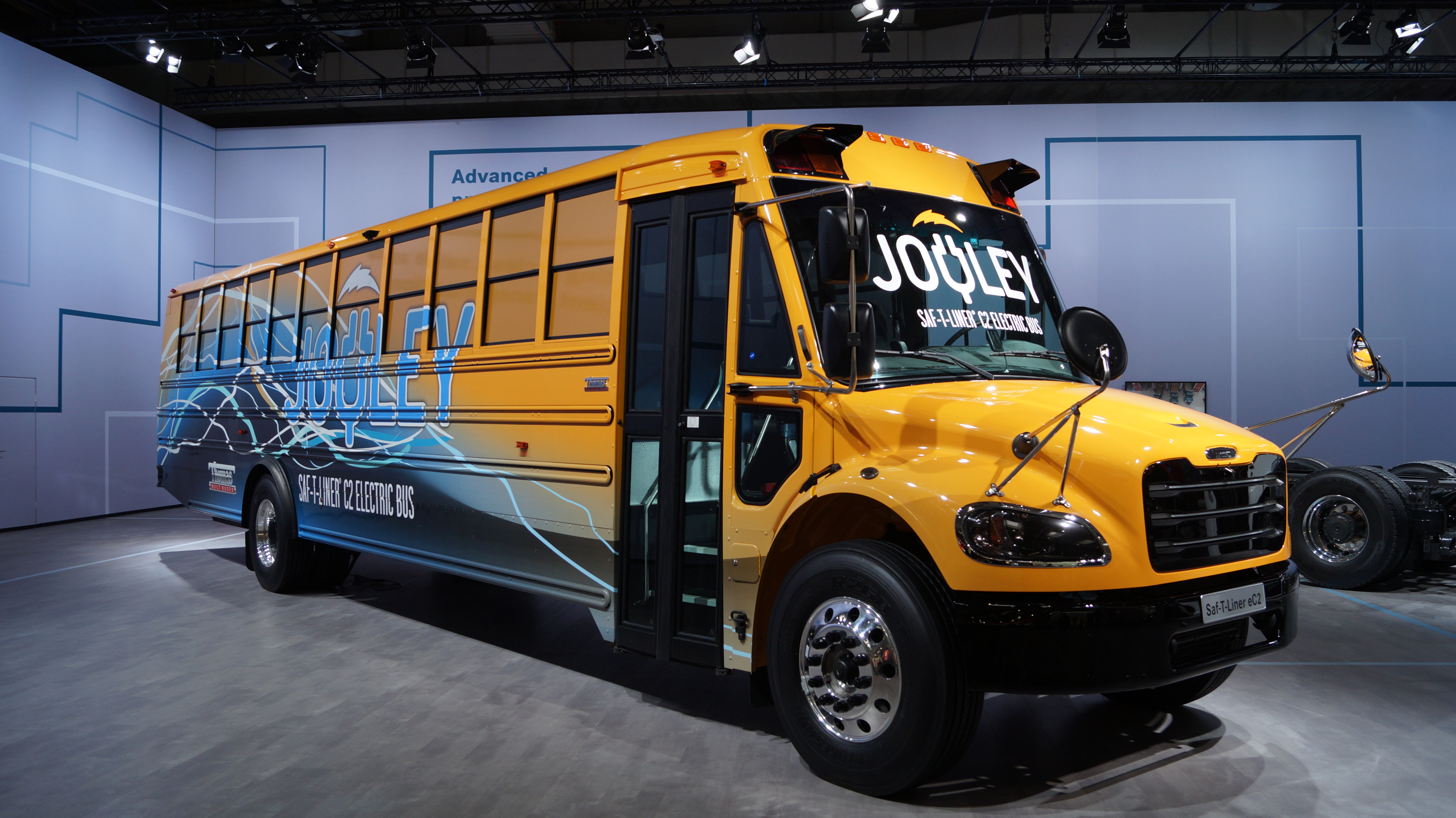
2018 Thomas Saf-T-Liner C2 Jouley (prototype all-electric bus)

In 2011, the High Point facilities of Thomas Built Buses achieved Zero-Waste-to-Landfill status in its vehicle production. A year later, the company was designated a North Carolina Environmental Steward, citing its superior environmental performance, commitment to continued reduction of its environmental impact, and demonstrated commitment to exceed compliance regulations.

In late 2017, in line with each major school bus manufacturer, Thomas unveiled a fully electric school bus prototype. The Saf-T-Liner C2 Jouley (deriving its name from the unit of energy) entered full production during 2020.

=== 2020-present ===
In July 2024, Thomas Built Buses revamped the model into the Saf-T-Liner HDX2, which takes design cues from the Type C Saf-T-Liner C2. In March 2025, Thomas Built Buses announced the new Saf-T-Liner EFX2 which, like the HDX2, takes design cues from the Saf-T-Liner C2. Both newly introduced buses will be produced in the same Archdale, North Carolina plant as the C2. This marks the full transition of Type-D production to the Saf-T-Liner C2 Facility (now the Saf-T-Liner Facility).

In October 2025, Thomas Built Buses introduced the Saf-T-Liner eHDX2 "Wattson", an electric version of the HDX2.

== Products ==
Thomas Built Buses is a manufacturer of school bus bodies in cutaway van (Minotour), conventional (early Mighty-Mite series) (Saf-T-Liner C2), and transit-style (Saf-T-Liner EFX2/HDX2) configurations. Other bodies produced by the company include derivatives of its school bus designs (activity buses and child-care buses) along with buses for commercial use; some vehicles are intended for specialty use.

Alongside diesel-fueled vehicles, dependent on product line, Thomas buses are also offered with alternative-fuel options, including propane, CNG, gasoline, and fully electric powertrains.

=== School buses ===
Current product line
Model Name	Thomas Minotour MyBus	Thomas Saf-T-Liner C2	Thomas Saf-T-Liner (EFX2, HDX2)
Photo			
Year Introduced	Minotour: 1980; MyBus: 2009	2004	EFX: 2012 (as Saf-T-Liner EFX) 2025 (as Saf-T Liner EFX2); HDX: 2000 (as Saf-T-Liner HD) 2002 (as Saf-T-Liner HDX) 2024 (as Saf-T Liner HDX2)
Assembly	High Point, North Carolina		
Configuration	Type A (cutaway): single rear wheel, dual rear wheel (Minotour, MyBus)	Type C (conventional)	Type D (transit-style)
Chassis Manufacturer	Ford Motor Company: Ford E-Series (E-350/E-450); General Motors: Chevrolet Express/GMC Savana	Daimler Trucks North America LLC (Freightliner): Freightliner C2 (Freightliner M2 106)	Thomas Built Buses: Front-engine Type D chassis; Rear-engine Type D chassis
Fuel type(s)	Minotour: Gasoline; MyBus: Gasoline	Compressed Natural Gas (CNG); Diesel; Propane; Electric	EFX2: Diesel; HDX2: Diesel; Electric
Passenger Capacity	14-30	up to 81	up to 90
Other notes	Minotour: Produced as school bus and MFSAB; MyBus: Based on Minotour, produced only as MFSAB on Chevrolet/GMC chassis; Produced as school bus, commercial bus, and MFSAB/activity bus	Uses Freightliner C2 chassis, derived from Freightliner M2 106 Business Class medium-duty truck; Replaces both Saf-T-Liner Conventional and Saf-T-Liner FS-65; Produced as diesel-electric hybrid (C2e) from 2007 to 2013; Propane version released in 2013; CNG Version released in 2016; Electric prototype called the "Jouley" shown in 2017; intended for 2019 production	EFX2: Produced as school bus, commercial bus, and MFSAB/activity bus; Replaced Thomas Saf-T-Liner EF in 2012; Shares some front bodywork and windshield with HDX.; HDX2: Produced as school bus, commercial bus, and MFSAB/activity bus; Introduced in 2000 as the Saf-T-Liner HD; replaced the Saf-T-Liner ER and Saf-T-Liner MVP ER.; Distinguished by large front mirror units, which mount the side-view, wide-angle, and cross-view mirrors into a single unit.

Former product lines
Model name	Production	Vehicle type	Chassis	Notes
Mighty Mite	1977?–1994?	Type B (integrated)	General Motors: Chevrolet P-30	Also the name of the lowest-capacity versions of Thomas Conventionals in the 1970s.; Also used for base for para-transit buses in Toronto.
Saf-T-Liner Conventional	1972–2002	Type C (conventional)	Chrysler Corporation: Dodge D-300 (to 1977); Ford Motor Company: Ford B600/B700/B800/B8000 (1972–1998); General Motors: Chevrolet/GMC B-Series (1972–1991); International Harvester; Navistar International: International Loadstar (1972–1978); International S-Series "Schoolmaster" (1979–1989); International 3800 (1989–2002)	Introduced in 1972 when the company renamed "Thomas Built Buses".; Distinguished by windshield wipers mounted above windshield (2-piece flat glass); Discontinued after the 2003 model year by the end of 2002.
Saf-T-Liner FS-65	1997–2006	Type C (conventional)	Freightliner (Daimler): Freightliner FS-65	Saf-T-Liner FS-65 is one product of the Freightliner purchase of Thomas in 1998.; All FS-65 chassis wore Thomas bodies after 2002.; Saf-T-Liner FS-65 body has a 4-piece windshield
Vista	1989–1998	Type C (conventional): semi-forward control	General Motors (1989–1991): Chevrolet/GMC B6 (modified); Navistar International (1991–1998): International 3600	To aid forward visibility, the Vista mounted the driver's seat alongside the engine rather than behind it, similar to a Type D bus.; Produced on a Thomas-badged Chevrolet/GMC chassis from 1989 to 1991 and an International chassis from 1991 to 1998.; 1994 update gained additional windshield and side windshield glass.
Saf-T-Liner EF/ER	Saf-T-Liner EF; 1972–1990, 2006–2012 Saf-T-Liner ER; 1972–2002	Type D (transit-style): front engine; rear engine	Various (to 1977); Thomas Built Buses	Saf-T-Liner EF: Introduced in 1972.; Replaced by All-Star in 1991.; Name reintroduced in 2006 as part of MVP redesign, replaced by EFX.; Saf-T-Liner ER: Introduced in 1972.; Fully discontinued in 2002.; Replaced by Saf-T-Liner HDX for 2003.; WestCoastER: Heavy-Duty derivative of Saf-T-Liner ER sold to West Coast customers.; Built with 84 and 90 passenger bodies; tandem rear axles were an option on 90-passenger version.
Saf-T-Liner MVP EF/ER, All-Star	All-Star; 1991–1994 Saf-T-Liner MVP EF; 1994–2006; Saf-T-Liner MVP ER; 1995–2000	Type D (transit-style): front engine; rear engine	All-Star: Oshkosh Corporation; Saf-T-Liner MVP EF/ER: Thomas Built Buses	All-Star: Front-engine chassis built by Oshkosh Corporation; built from 1991 to 1994 as a competitor to Blue Bird TC/2000.; Distinguished from MVP EF by having Thomas emblem above grille (rather than centered).; Distinguished by previous Saf-T-Liner EF by much larger windshield and dual headlights (rather than four); Saf-T-Liner MVP EF: Replaced All-Star in 1994; built on Thomas chassis.; MVP= Maneuverability, Visibility, and Protection.; Changed to Saf-T-Liner EF for 2007 as part of an update and replaced by EFX in 2012.; Saf-T-Liner MVP ER: Built on Thomas chassis; MVP= Maneuverability, Visibility, and Protection.; Replaced by Saf-T-Liner HD (later HDX) for 2001.

=== Other buses ===
Thomas sold commercial derivatives of the Minotour, Conventional, Vista, along with the following:

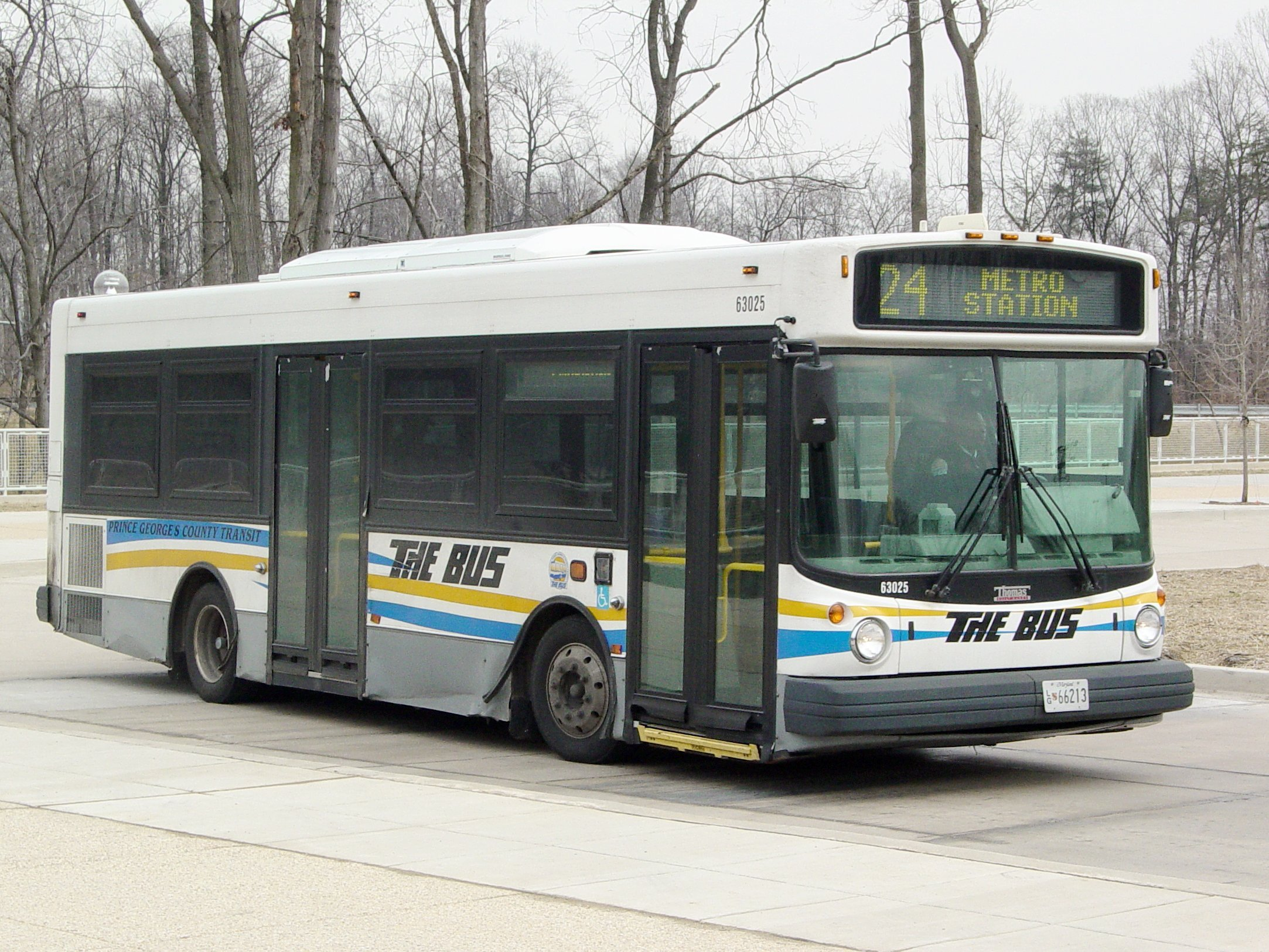
Thomas/Dennis SLF200

- Transit Liner MVP EF/ER- commercial derivative of Saf-T-Liner MVP school bus
- TL960 - rear-engine transit bus derived from Saf-T-Liner ER
- Chartour- rear-engine transit bus
- CL960 - rear-engine transit bus
- SLF200 (Super Low Floor) series - badge engineered transit bus built under license from Dennis Specialist Vehicles, based on the Alexander ALX200. It had a Dennis Dart SLF chassis.

=== Company timeline ===
Thomas Built Buses, Inc. timeline (1972–present)
Bus Type	1970s	1980s	1990s	2000s	2010s	2020s
'72	'73	'74	'75	'76	'77	'78	'79	'80	'81	'82	'83	'84	'85	'86	'87	'88	'89	'90	'91	'92	'93	'94	'95	'96	'97	'98	'99	'00	'01	'02	'03	'04	'05	'06	'07	'08	'09	'10	'11	'12	'13	'14	'15	'16	'17	'18	'19	'20	'21	'22	'23	'24	'25	'26
Type A	Minotour
MyBus
Type B	Mighty Mite
Type C	Saf-T-Liner	Conventional
FS-65
C2
Vista	Vista
Type D	Saf-T-Liner	EF/ER	ER
All Star EF	MVP EF	EF	EFX	EFX2
MVP ER
HD	HDX	HDX2
Transit buses	CL960 "CitiLiner"
Chartour
TL960 "TransLiner"
SLF200

== See also ==
- School bus
- Streetcar
