= Blackstone, Massachusetts =

- Town
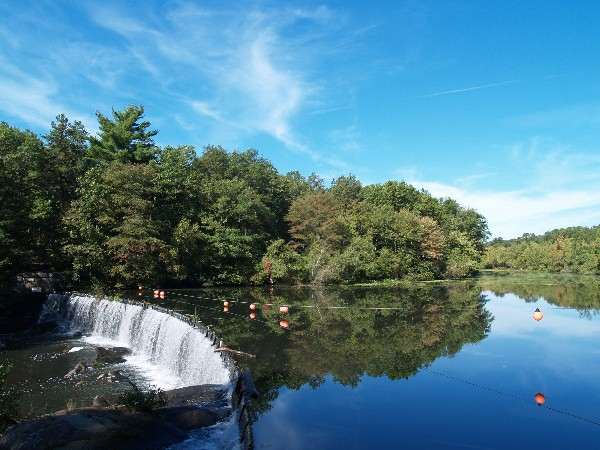
- Rolling Dam on the Blackstone River

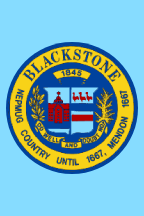
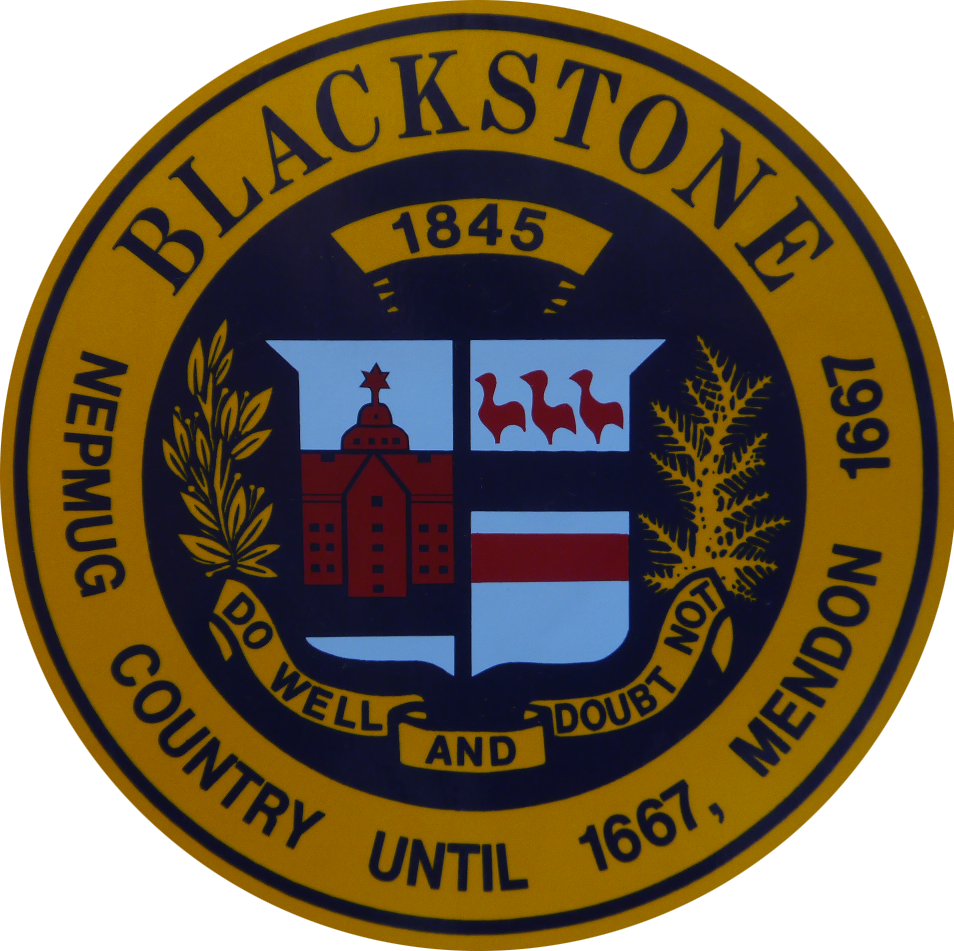
- Flag Seal
- Motto: "Do well and doubt not."
- Location in Worcester County and Massachusetts.
- Coordinates: 42°01′04″N 71°32′30″W
- Country: United States
- State: Massachusetts
- County: Worcester
- Settled: 1662
- Incorporated: 1845

Government
  - Type: Open town meeting
  - Town Administrator: Chad Lovett
  - Board of Selectmen: Brian Scanlan, selectman Daniel Keefe, Chairman; Michael Sweeney, Clerk; Mary Bulso, Selectman; Tanya Polak, Selectman

Area
  - Total: 11.2 sq mi (29.1 km^{2})
  - Land: 10.9 sq mi (28.2 km^{2})
  - Water: 0.35 sq mi (0.9 km^{2})
- Elevation: 187 ft (57 m)

Population (2020)
  - Total: 9,208
  - Density: 846/sq mi (327/km^{2})
- Time zone: UTC-5 (Eastern)
  - Summer (DST): UTC-4 (Eastern)
- ZIP code: 01504
- Area code: 508 / 774
- FIPS code: 25-06015
- GNIS feature ID: 0619477
- Website: www.townofblackstone.org

Blackstone is a town in Worcester County, Massachusetts, United States. The population was 9,208 at the 2020 census. It is a part of the Providence metropolitan area.

== History ==
This region was first inhabited by the Nipmuc. Blackstone was settled by European immigrants in 1662 and was incorporated in 1845. The town was part of Mendon, Massachusetts, before becoming a separate municipality. It was named after William Blaxton, an early settler of New England and the first European settler of Rhode Island and Boston. Blackstone is within the area of the John H. Chaffee Blackstone River Valley National Heritage Corridor of Massachusetts and Rhode Island.

== Geography ==
According to the United States Census Bureau, the town has a total area of 11.2 square miles (29 km^{2}), of which 10.9 square miles (28 km^{2}) is land and 0.3 square miles (0.78 km^{2}), or 2.94%, is water. The Blackstone River, birthplace of the Industrial Revolution in the United States, meanders west to southeast, on the south border of town.

The town is bordered by North Smithfield, Rhode Island and Woonsocket, Rhode Island to the south; Millville, Massachusetts to the west; Mendon, Massachusetts to the north, and Bellingham, Massachusetts (Norfolk County) to the east.

Named places in the town include:

- Blackstone Village
- Central Village
- East Blackstone
- Farnum's Gate
- Five Corners
- High Rocks
- Millerville
- New City
- Privilege
- Rural District
- Waterford
- Wheelockville
- Woonsocket Junction (New York and New England Railroad junction)

An East Blackstone railroad station used to be located in Bellingham.

== Demographics ==
Historical population
Year	Pop.	±%
1850	4,391	—
1860	5,453	+24.2%
1870	5,421	−0.6%
1880	4,907	−9.5%
1890	6,138	+25.1%
1900	5,721	−6.8%
1910	5,648	−1.3%
1920	4,299	−23.9%
1930	4,674	+8.7%
1940	4,566	−2.3%
1950	4,968	+8.8%
1960	5,130	+3.3%
1970	6,566	+28.0%
1980	6,570	+0.1%
1990	8,023	+22.1%
2000	8,804	+9.7%
2010	9,026	+2.5%
2020	9,208	+2.0%
2022*	9,211	+0.0%
* = population estimate. Source: United States census records and Population Estimates Program data.

As of the census of 2000, there were 8,804 people, 3,235 households, and 2,355 families residing in the town. The population density was 807.4 inhabitants per square mile (311.7/km^{2}). There were 3,331 housing units at an average density of 305.5 per square mile (118.0/km^{2}). The racial makeup of the town was 97.39% White, 0.33% African American, 0.24% Native American, 0.76% Asian, 0.01% Pacific Islander, 0.24% from other races, and 1.03% from two or more races. Hispanic or Latino of any race were 1.03% of the population.

There were 3,235 households, out of which 38.2% had children under the age of 18 living with them, 58.9% were married couples living together, 9.9% had a female householder with no husband present, and 27.2% were non-families. 22.4% of all households were made up of individuals, and 8.5% had someone living alone who was 65 years of age or older. The average household size was 2.71 and the average family size was 3.20.

In the town, the population was spread out, with 27.7% under the age of 18, 7.5% from 18 to 24, 33.7% from 25 to 44, 20.9% from 45 to 64, and 10.1% who were 65 years of age or older. The median age was 35 years. For every 100 females, there were 98.2 males. For every 100 females age 18 and over, there were 94.5 males.

The median income for a household in the town was $55,163, and the median income for a family was $61,633. Males had a median income of $42,100 versus $27,448 for females. The per capita income for the town was $20,936. About 1.8% of families and 3.7% of the population were below the poverty line, including 2.2% of those under age 18 and 12.0% of those age 65 or over.

== Education ==
Blackstone, being part of the broader Blackstone-Millville Regional School District, is home to the Blackstone-Millville Regional High School, serving both the town of Blackstone and its western neighbor, Millville.

In 2003, a new middle school was constructed, the Frederick W. Hartnett Middle School, named after former superintendent of schools, Frederick Hartnett. Blackstone is also home to the Augustine F. Maloney Elementary School, and to the John F. Kennedy Elementary School.

== Adjacent city and towns ==
- Woonsocket, Rhode Island
- Millville
- North Smithfield, Rhode Island
- Mendon
- Bellingham

== Government ==
State government
State Representative(s):	Michael Soter (R)
State Senator(s):	Ryan Fattman (R)
Governor's Councilor(s):	Paul DePalo (D)
Federal government
U.S. Representative(s):	James P. McGovern (D-2nd District),
U.S. Senators:	Elizabeth Warren (D), Ed Markey (D)

== Notable people ==
- Albert J. Adams, racketeer
- Perley Dunn Aldrich, composer
- Con Daily, baseball player
- Matthew Dicks, author
- Eddie Eayrs, baseball pitcher and outfielder in parts of three seasons in the major leagues
- Ambrose Kennedy, politician
- Donald Pelletier, prelate
- Bob Stewart, baseball umpire
- Fernand St. Germain, politician
- Eva March Tappan, author
- Webster Thayer, judge
- Gilbert Thompson, typographer
