= Perley A. Thomas =

Canadian-born entrepreneur

Perley Albert Thomas (1874–1958) was a Canadian-born American industrialist and entrepreneur. He was trained as a millsmith (specifically in woodworking), and moved to Cleveland, Ohio, where he was employed by a streetcar manufacturer.

Thomas was born on a farm outside of Chatham, Ontario, grew up in the area and in 1901 he moved to the US settling in Detroit.

He attended night courses at Case Institute of Technology, and learned technical drawing, design skills, and structural engineering. As the streetcar manufacturers transitioned from wooden to steel construction, his expertise allowed him to accept a better offer with Southern Car Company in High Point, North Carolina, where he became chief engineer, and he and his wife moved south in 1910. Thomas became chief engineer, draftsman and designer for the company, using both his mechanical skills and his experience as a skilled woodworker. After he was laid off there when the company folded in 1916, he was persuaded to undertake a contract to renovate streetcars for the Southern Public Utilities Company of Charlotte, North Carolina, using Southern's former facilities and many of its employees. The following year, he organized Perley A. Thomas Car Works, which became famous for its streetcars.

Perley A. Thomas streetcars were renowned for their expert craftsmanship and solid construction, and operated in many large North American cities, including Detroit, Michigan, New York City, Miami, Florida and San Juan, Puerto Rico. A famous Tennessee Williams play and later film of the same name was set in New Orleans, Louisiana, where Perley A. Thomas streetcars were operated on the route labeled "Desire" around the period of 1947 in which the story was set; hence the name: A Streetcar Named Desire. Late in the 20th century, local employees carefully restored the cars, which operate on a heritage streetcar system.

As he had noted and taken advantage of the transition from wooden to steel streetcars, he also recognized the transition from streetcars to buses which North America was undergoing in the 1930s. Thomas guided his company through a transition to bus manufacturing in 1936.

The Perley A. Thomas Car Works was later reorganized as Thomas Built Buses, Inc., and became one of the three principal builders of large school buses in the United States by the end of the 20th century. It is still based in High Point, and is part of the Freightliner Group of Daimler AG, a worldwide automotive manufacturer.

Perley A. Thomas was inducted into the North Carolina Transportation Hall of Fame in 2004. He was inducted into the North American Railway Hall of Fame, St Thomas, Ontario, in 2010.
