= Perley A. Thomas Car Works =

American Rolling stock manufacturer

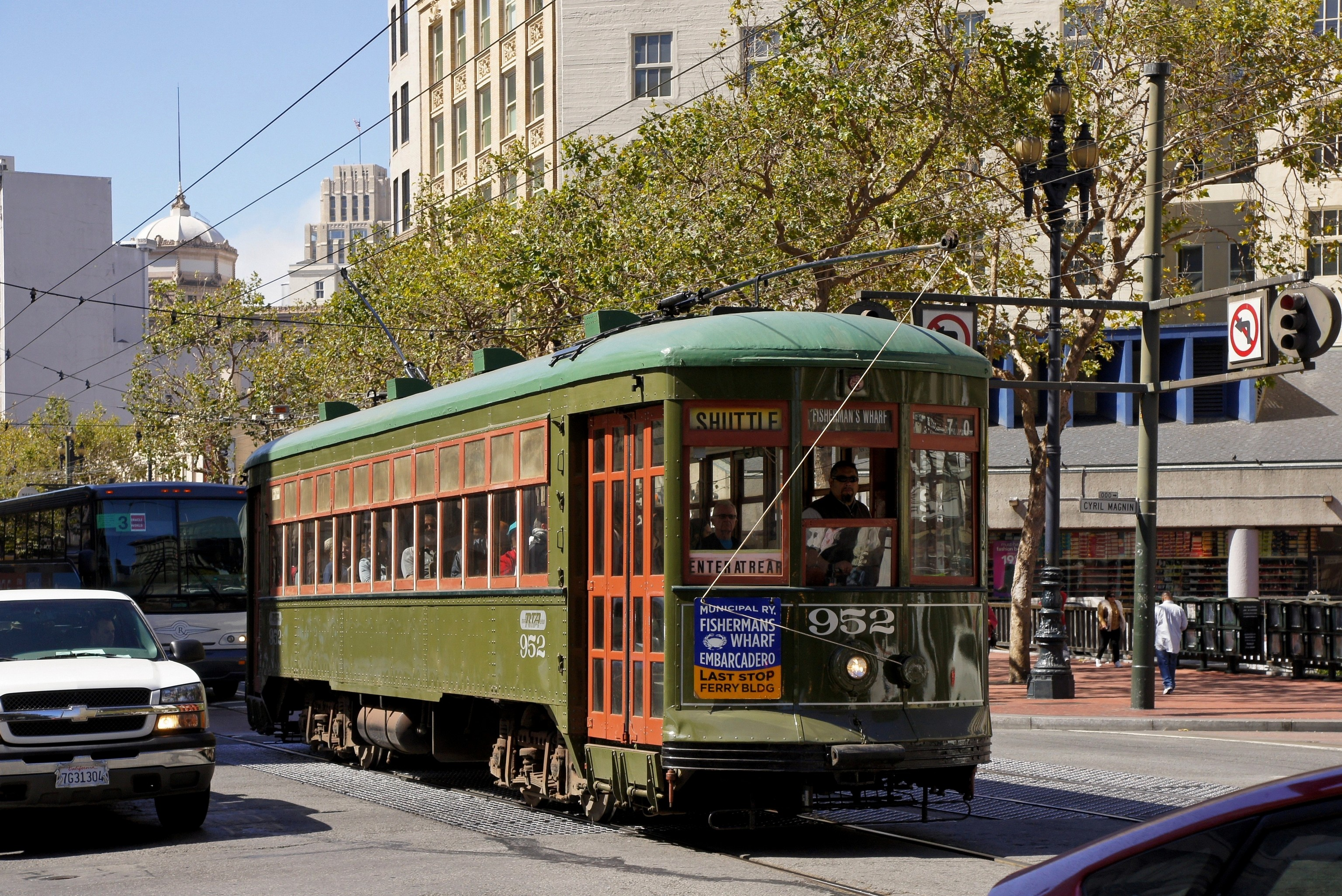
- Perley A. Thomas Car Works street car #952 on Market Street in San Francisco, 2010
- Industry: Transportation
- Founded: High Point, North Carolina, 1916
- Founder: Perley A. Thomas
- Fate: Renamed in 1972 as Thomas Built Buses
- Successor: Thomas Built Buses, Inc.
- Headquarters: High Point, North Carolina, United States
- Area served: North America
- Products: Streetcars; School buses

Perley A. Thomas Car Works, Inc. was an American manufacturer of streetcars based in High Point, North Carolina. Following the liquidation of Southern Car Works, its engineer Perley A. Thomas in 1916 founded the new company named for himself. Along with the manufacture of complete streetcars, Thomas Car Works also renovated and repaired existing cars to supplement its production.

At the beginning of the Great Depression, mass transit in the United States largely transitioned in format from streetcars to automotive-based buses, leading Thomas Car Works to convert to bus production. From the mid-1930s onward, the company dedicated its production towards school buses. Following World War II, the company became one of the primary manufacturers of large school bus bodies in the United States, leading Perley A. Thomas Car Works to be renamed as Thomas Built Buses, Inc. in 1972.

As Thomas Built Buses, the company is still based in High Point, operating as a subsidiary of Freightliner Trucks (of Daimler AG) since 1998.

== History ==
=== 1910s ===
In 1910, Perley A. Thomas joined Southern Car Company in High Point, North Carolina as an engineer and designer. By 1915, the company had begun its transition from wood-bodied designs to all-steel vehicles. However, Southern Car was unable to remain competitive, leading to its closure in early 1916. Following the closure of Southern Car Company, Thomas relied on his woodworking background and the furniture industry of High Point to found his own company, producing fireplace mantles and other home furnishings.

In the summer of 1916, Thomas was contracted by Southern Public Utilities Company in Charlotte, North Carolina to enclose its fleet of streetcars. As they were Southern Car Company streetcars designed by Thomas, the utility company sought him out for the renovation. Along with a small crew of former Southern Car Company builders, Thomas performed the work in a Charlotte car barn.

One month after securing the contract in Charlotte, Perley A. Thomas Car Works was officially organized in High Point, with Thomas hiring 30 employees from the former Southern Car Company. With a $6,000 loan, Thomas acquired the equipment of his former employer at auction, opening an assembly facility in a former ice manufacturing plant in High Point. By the end of the year, four additional cars were renovated for Southern Public Utilities in Winston-Salem, North Carolina. During 1917, Thomas Car Works renovated 9 streetcars for the United States Navy in Mobile, Alabama and a group of streetcars for Montgomery, Alabama.

In 1918, Thomas Car Works would see several company milestones, commencing production of new streetcars for the first time. The factory was capable of producing wooden or steel bodies, with the latter quickly becoming the most common (Southern Car had introduced all-steel bodies in 1911). At the end of the year, a 30-acre property was secured outside of High Point; the company constructed a larger assembly facility, allowing for simultaneous construction and repair/renovation of streetcars. In total, 25 streetcars were produced in the first year of production.

=== 1920s ===
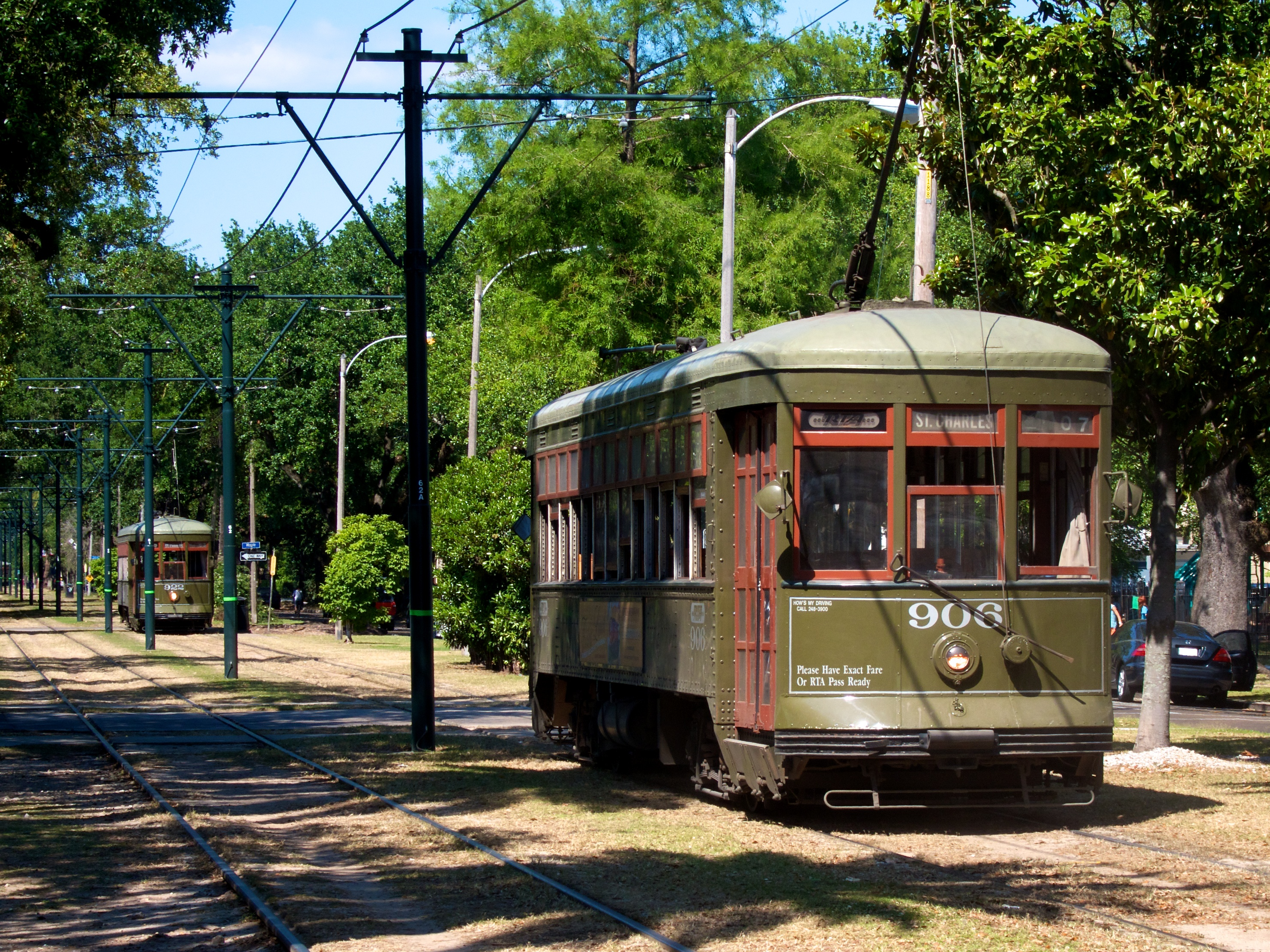
Two 900-series Perley Thomas streetcars in New Orleans

As a streetcar manufacturer, Thomas Car Works saw its greatest success during the 1920s, becoming one of the largest manufacturers of electric streetcars in the United States. In 1921, the company secured its largest-ever order of streetcars, from NOPSI (New Orleans Public Service Inc.). In total, 173 streetcars were ordered from 1921 to 1924, as NOPSI sought to standardize their fleet. The steel-bodied 800-900-series streetcars were double-ended (two sets of operating controls and two trolley poles), double-trucked, with an arched roof. Unable to fill the massive order entirely on their own, Thomas Car Works subcontracted a portion of the order to Philadelphia-based competitor J. G. Brill (using the Thomas design).

In September 1922, after the company had delivered 25 streetcars to NOPSI, the High Point factory was destroyed by fire, causing $225,000 in damage (along with 14 streetcars under construction). In response, Perley Thomas secured $100,000 from NOPSI to secure the parts to construct an order of 55 streetcars; a second order of 25 streetcars was delivered by the end of 1923. In total, NOPSI would order 173 800-900-series streetcars, with Thomas Car Works producing 98 (not including the 14 destroyed in the factory fire). The High Point factory was rebuilt to hold three tracks inside the factory; three stations on each track allowed 9 cars to be worked on simultaneously. The factory employed a 125-employee workforce, with seven complete streetcars produced each week on average.

In 1926, the Detroit United Railroad ordered 100 streetcars from Thomas Car Works; the 48-foot (14.63 m) long design was the longest streetcar ever built by the company. The sole manufacturer of the design, Thomas delivered streetcars to Detroit from 1926 to 1929.

=== 1930s ===
During the 1930s, Thomas Car Works would see several changes that would alter the company forever. Following the large order from Detroit, demand for streetcars began to decline sharply. In 1930, the company received its last order for streetcars, producing 4 for Mobile, Alabama. Subsequently, all production would transition away from rail to road-based vehicles. During 1931 and 1932, no vehicles were produced, shifting to repairs, streetcar renovations, and automotive refinishing. In 1933, the company produced its first trolley coach (an electric bus with a pair of trolley poles).

In mass transit, by the 1930s, rail-based streetcars were losing ground to automotive-based buses; the latter were not dependent on the power grid for their operation (and ownership), and buses offered more flexibility in routing. In 1934, Thomas built its first transit bus for Duke Power (the successor to the first Thomas customer).

In 1936, Thomas Car Works entered a bid to produce school bus bodies for the state of North Carolina. While required to produce 500 bodies, the company was only able to secure the materials for 200; North Carolina would split the bid between Thomas and Hackney Brothers. After five months of production, the bid was completed at a profit. For 1937, Thomas returned to bid for North Carolina school bus production, commencing a tradition that remains to this day.

=== Post World War II ===
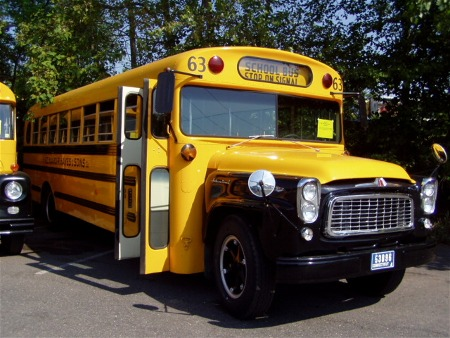
1961 Thomas Car Works Saf-T-Liner (on International B-160 chassis)

In 1940, Perley A. Thomas retired (at age 65), remaining as president and design consultant. During World War II, Thomas Car Works was active in war production, shifting from buses to bodies for the GMC CCKW 2½-ton 6x6 truck. As an additional means of revenue, the company renovated and repaired its former streetcars. Although streetcars had largely fallen out of favor, the suspension of domestic vehicle production was also applied towards transit vehicles as well as private automobiles; some cities had retained the networks for the operation of streetcars into the 1940s.

After World War II, Thomas Car Works returned to vehicle production, concentrating nearly entirely on school buses. In 1957, Thomas Car Works introduced the "Saf-T-Liner" trade name for the first time.

In 1958, Perley Thomas died at the age of 84; until his death, he would remain a design consultant in his retirement.

In 1972, as a third generation of the Thomas family assumed leadership, Perley A. Thomas Car Works was reorganized as Thomas Built Buses, Inc. Adopting a brand name in use by Thomas since the 1950s, the change was explained as bringing the company closer to its core product line of buses, 42 years after producing its final streetcar.

== Operators ==
Perley A. Thomas Car Works 900-series
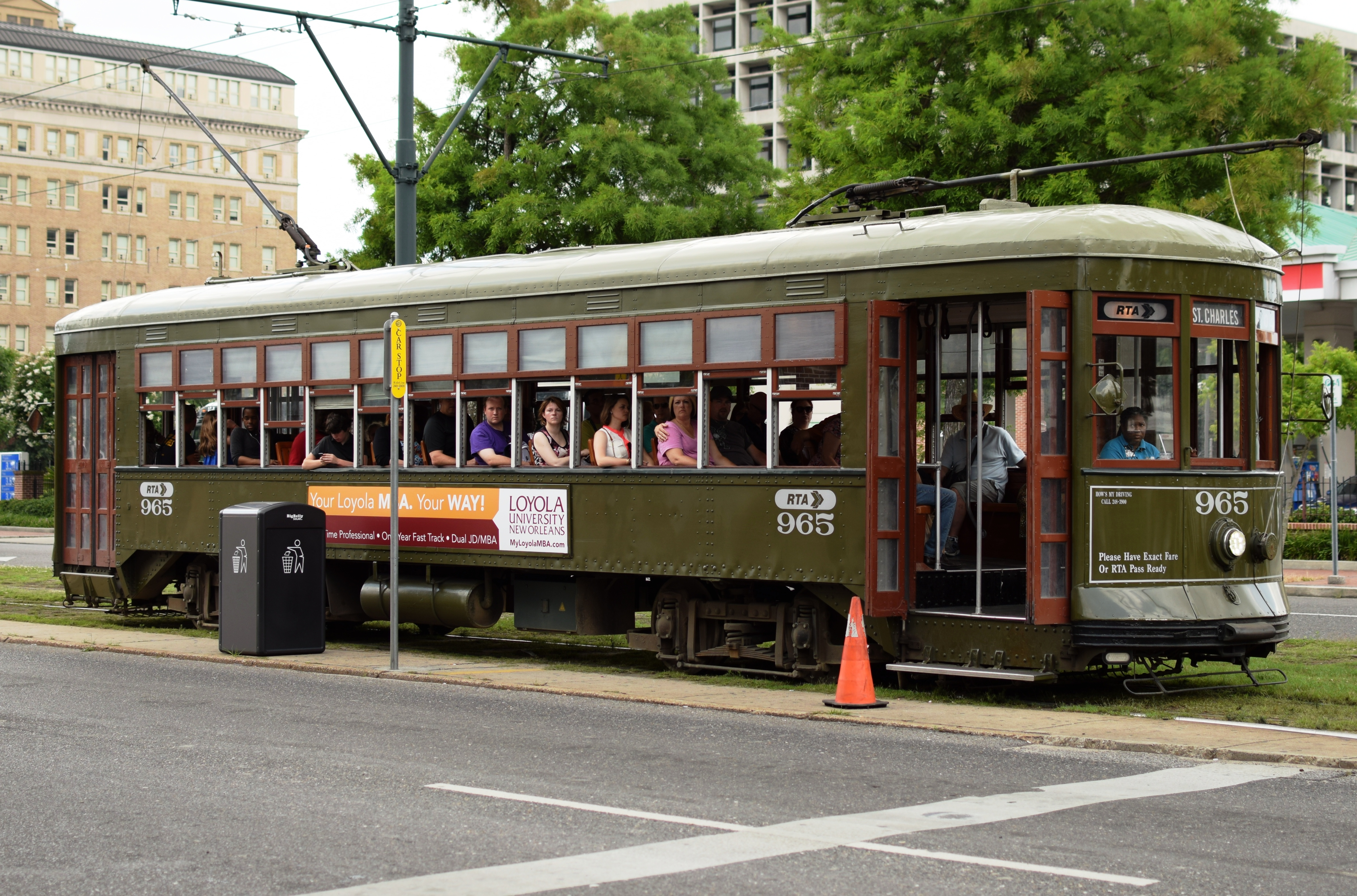
- New Orleans RTA #965 on St. Charles Line

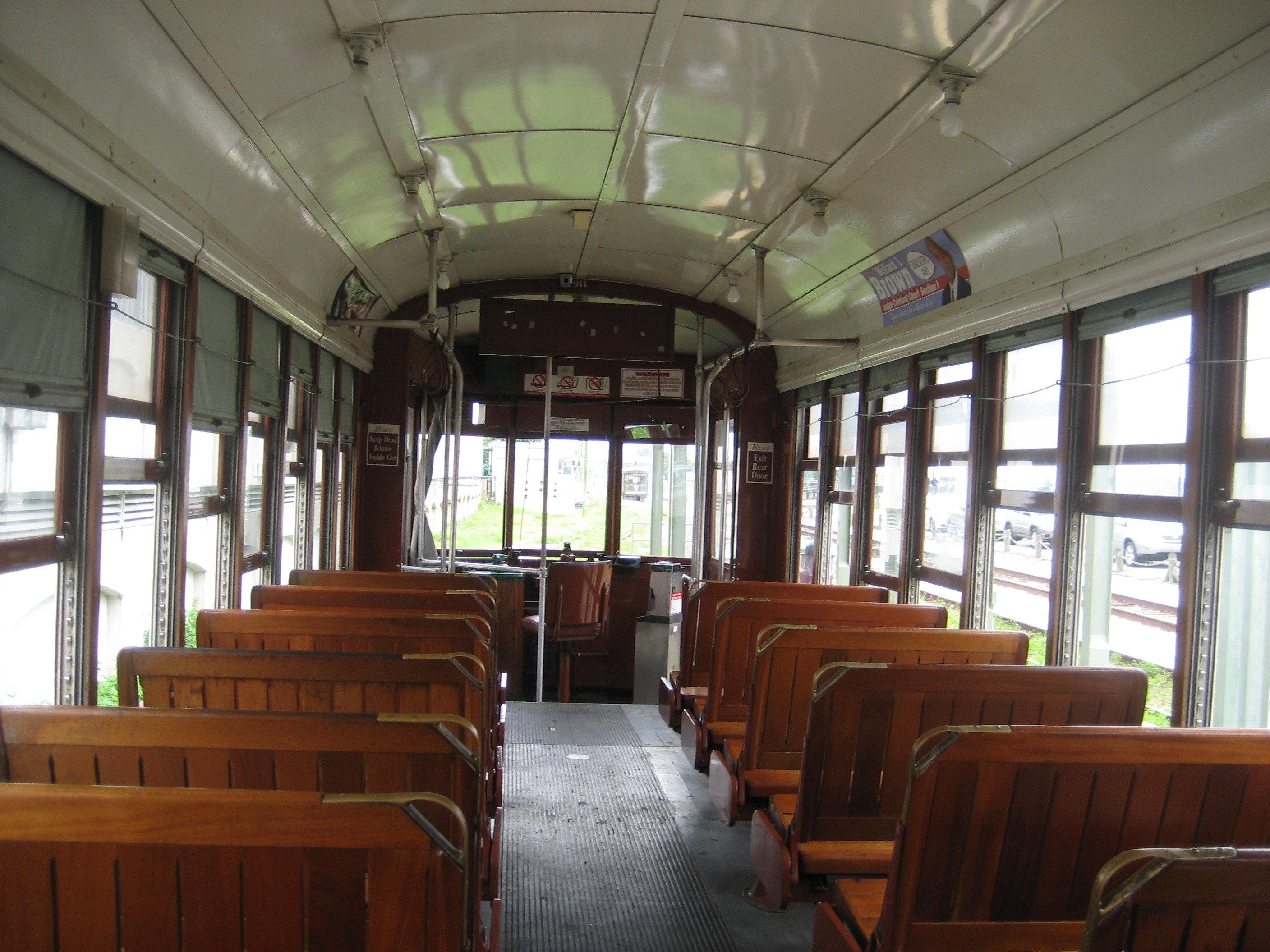
- Interior of Perley Thomas streetcar
- Manufacturer: Perley A. Thomas Car Works
- Designer: Perley A. Thomas
- Assembly: High Point, North Carolina
- Constructed: 1922–1924
- Entered service: 1922–present (New Orleans)
- Number built: 173
- Number in service: 35
- Number preserved: 10
- Predecessor: Southern Car Works 400-series
- Fleet numbers: 800-972

Specifications
- Car body construction: Steel
- Car length: 47 ft 8 in (14.53 m)
- Width: 8 ft 7 in (2.62 m)
- Height: 11 ft 6 in (3.51 m)
- Doors: Four (front and rear, each side)
- Wheel diameter: 33 in (0.84 m)
- Wheelbase: 4 ft 10 in (1.47 m)
- Weight: 42,000 lb (19,000 kg)
- Traction motors: 2x GE263
- Power output: 130 hp (96.94 kW)
- Electric systems: 600 V DC from overhead catenary
- Current collection: Trolley pole
- UIC classification: (1A)(A1)
- AAR wheel arrangement: 1A-A1
- Bogies: Brill 76E2
- Braking system: Air
- Seating: 52
- Track gauge: 5 ft 2 1/2 in (1,588 mm) Pennsylvania Trolley Gauge

In total, over 400 newly built streetcars were assembled by Perley A. Thomas Car Works from 1918 to 1930.

During streetcar production, Thomas produced streetcars for the following cities:

- Philadelphia, PA
- Washington, D.C.
- New York, NY
- Chicago, IL
- New Orleans, LA (see below)
- Charlotte, NC
- Greenville, NC
- High Point, NC
- Mobile, AL
- Sheffield, AL
- Detroit, MI
- Miami, FL
- Augusta, GA
- Knoxville, TN
- San Juan, Puerto Rico
- Havana, Cuba

=== Usage in New Orleans ===
As of 2019, the New Orleans Regional Transit Authority operates 35 Perley Thomas 900-series streetcars in active daily use, nearly a century after their construction. Dating from 1923 and 1924, the Thomas streetcars are operated on the St. Charles line (the oldest continuously operating streetcar line in the world). In 2005, all 35 Thomas streetcars survived Hurricane Katrina unharmed, while 30 of the 31 replica streetcars required restoration, placing them out of service through 2009. The Thomas cars are painted the traditional olive green color. Most of the replica cars are bright red, although a few have been painted olive green to provide ADA-compliant service on the St. Charles line.

To keep the Thomas streetcars in service, the RTA established a parts shop with the capability of building a complete replica of the Thomas streetcar design on its own to maintain a stock of replacement parts. The shop designed and produced the replica cars used on the Canal Street Line and the Riverfront Line. Along with the difference in color, the newer designs are ADA-compliant, and the Canal Street cars are air-conditioned.

== Preservation ==
Outside of their active usage in New Orleans, four Thomas streetcars (all from New Orleans) have been preserved by railway museums across the United States. Two additional streetcars are undergoing renovations for use as heritage streetcars in San Francisco. Two other cars, #919 and #924, retired from the Riverfront line, are owned by New Orleans RTA, but are currently inoperable.

Examples include:

- Connecticut Trolley Museum (NOPSI Car #836)
- Seashore Trolley Museum (NOPSI Car #966)
- Pennsylvania Trolley Museum (NOPSI #832)
- Shore Line Trolley Museum (NOPSI #850)

NOPSI Cars #913 and #952 are under the operation of San Francisco Municipal Railway (Muni). Both built in 1923, 952 is leased to Muni from New Orleans RTA since 1998; 913 was purchased from Orange Empire Railway Museum in 2005. As of 2019, both cars are in the process of restoration; 913 has not seen active service since 1964 and funds are being raised for its restoration.

Hagerstown and Frederick Railway Suburban Coach 150 is preserved inside the Myersville Public Library in Myersville, MD. 150 was built in 1918 for the Columbia Street Railway in South Carolina. H&F acquired 150 (along with three other Thomas cars) in 1923 for service out of Hagerstown to Boonsboro and Funkstown. In 1938, service to Boonsboro and Funkstown ended and the 150 was sold for scrap value. 150 was discovered as part of a home near Gambrill State Park and was purchased by Donald Easterday in 1990. Mr. Easterday moved the car to his property outside Myersville where it was restored and displayed for Myersville's Trolley Days. Following Easterday's passing in 2016, the car was donated to the town of Myersville. In 2019, 150 found its new permanent home inside the brand new public library.

== In popular culture ==
A famous Tennessee Williams play (and later, film) was set in New Orleans, Louisiana where Perley A. Thomas streetcars were operated on the Desire line around the period of 1947 in which the story was set, hence the name: A Streetcar Named Desire.
