= Perley Dunn Aldrich =

- Born: November 6, 1863; Blackstone, Massachusetts, U.S.
- Died: November 20, 1933 (aged 70)
- Resting place: Elmwood Cemetery, Adams, New York
- Occupations: Vocal teacher, composer, conductor
- Spouse: Jennie L. Lamson (m. 1887)

Perley Dunn Aldrich (November 6, 1863 – November 20, 1933) was a vocal teacher, composer, and conductor.

== Biography ==
He was born on November 6, 1863, in Blackstone, Massachusetts. In 1887, he married Jennie L. Lamson. He died on November 20, 1933, at the age of 70. He was buried in Elmwood Cemetery in Adams, New York.
