= Freightliner Argosy =

Model line of cabover trucks

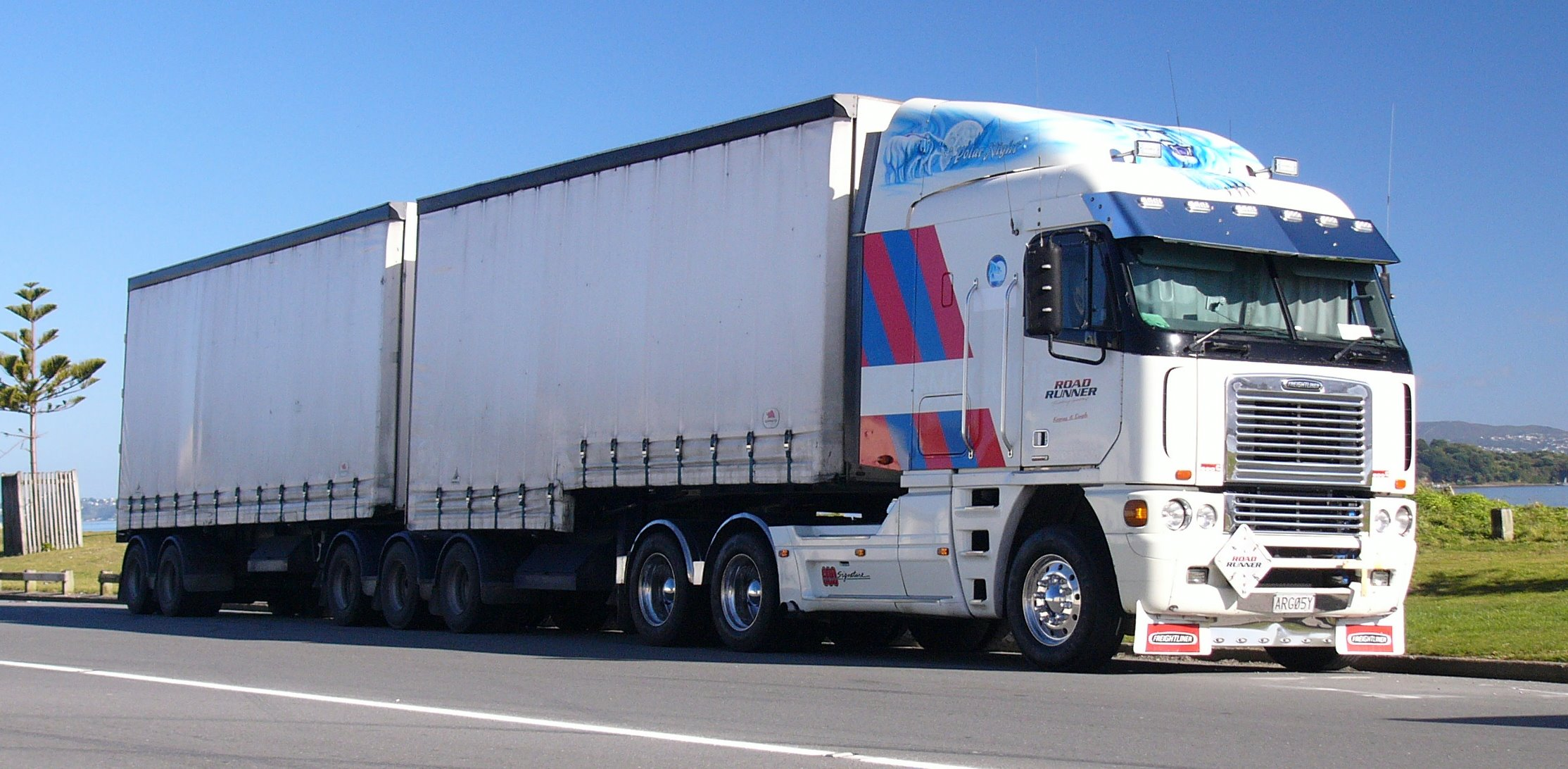
- 2008 Freightliner Argosy Evolution 6x4 as a B-double prime mover in New Zealand (note grille being flushed with bumper vents between headlights)

Overview
- Type: Truck
- Manufacturer: Freightliner Trucks (Daimler Trucks North America)
- Also called: Freightliner Century Class Argosy; Freightliner Argosy Safety Concept Vehicle
- Production: 1998–2020
- Model years: 1999–2006 (North American production); 1999–2020 (export)
- Assembly: United States: Cleveland, North Carolina

Body and chassis
- Class: Class 8 truck
- Body style: COE: 63-inch day cab; 90-inch mid roof; 101-inch mid-roof; 110-inch midroof; 110-inch raised roof
- Layout: 4x2 6x4
- Related: Freightliner Century Class; Freightliner Cascadia

Powertrain
- Engine: Caterpillar C12; Cummins ISM; Cummins ISX; Detroit Diesel Series 60; Detroit Diesel DD15; Mercedes-Benz OM457 (1998 concept only)
- Transmission: 18-speed Eaton-Fuller UltraShift - PLUS; 18-Speed Eaton-Fuller Autoshift Eaton-Fuller 10 speed, 13 speed, and 15 speed.

Dimensions
- Curb weight: 20,000 lb

Chronology
- Predecessor: Freightliner FLA/FLB
- Successor: Freightliner Cascadia (Export markets); Mercedes-Benz Actros (Export markets, indirect)

The Freightliner Argosy is a model line of cabover trucks that was produced by the American truck manufacturer Freightliner from the 1999 to 2020 model years. Developed as the replacement for the FLB cabover, the Argosy was a Class 8 truck, configured primarily for highway use. Competing against the International 9800, Kenworth K100E, and Peterbilt 362, the Argosy was the final Class 8 cabover marketed in North America, following the decline in use of the design in the United States and Canada.

After the 2006 model year, Freightliner shifted mass production of the model line entirely to export, ending sales of Class 8 COEs in North America. Sold nearly exclusively to South Africa, Australia, and New Zealand, the Argosy was produced through 2020. In North America, the model line remained available as a glider truck on a limited basis, ending in 2020.

Through its entire production, Freightliner assembled the Argosy in Cleveland, North Carolina. This facility produced vehicles for both North America and for export, as well as glider vehicles. In Australia and New Zealand, Freightliner replaced the Argosy with its Freightliner Cascadia conventional (bonneted) truck.

== Model overview ==
The Argosy made its debut in 1998 as the Freightliner Argosy Safety Concept Vehicle. Derived from the Freightliner Century Class conventional, the concept cabover truck shared major production components, including its doors, windshield, headlamps, and grille. Along with visual commonality, the Safety Concept Vehicle adopted telematics from the Century Class, facilitating electronic braking, messaging capability, daytime running lights, and traction control. In contrast to the production Argosy, the concept vehicle was fitted with a Mercedes-Benz OM457 12.0L I6 turbodiesel; it was fitted with 22.5-inch front wheels, with lower-profile 19.5-inch rear wheels.

Intended to preview a successor to the FLB-series cabover (introduced in 1987), the Argosy Safety Concept Vehicle was distinguished by a nearly flat interior floor (reducing the engine intrusion to only 3 inches high), outward-pivoting entrance steps, and a shorter vehicle length (allowing it to tow a trailer as long as 58 feet in the United States). While sales of COEs had declined to a 3% market share of the Class 8 truck segment for 1998, Freightliner had predicted that its new design would lead to a revival of the configuration.

=== First generation (1999–2011) ===
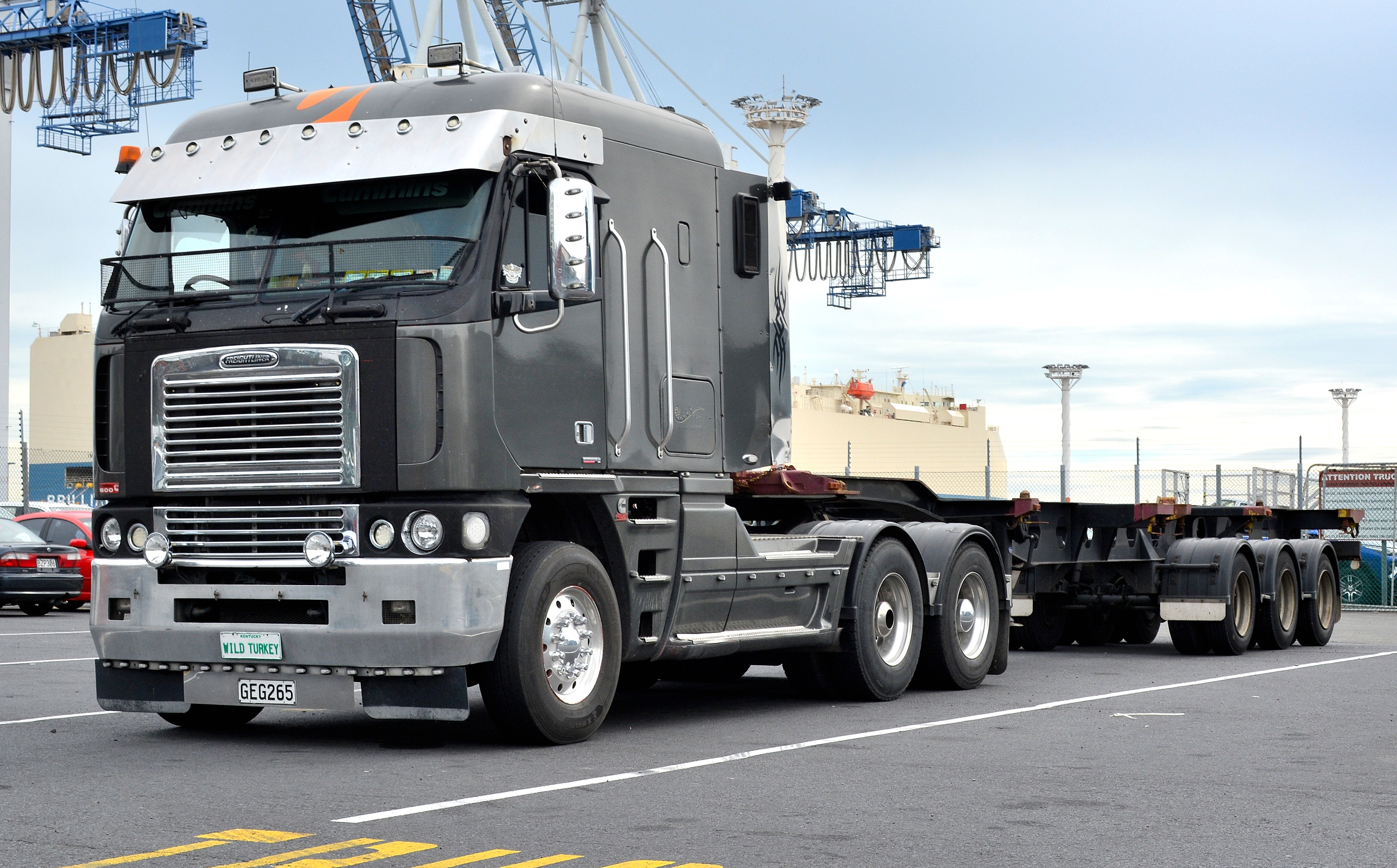
2001 Argosy SSB (New Zealand)

Entering mass production in 1999, the Freightliner Argosy replaced both the FLB and FLA Class 8 COEs, becoming the third generation of tilting Freightliner cabovers. Adopting virtually the entire design of the 1998 concept vehicle, the Argosy combined the set-back and set-forward front axles of its predecessors with an axle placement directly below the driver.

Several cab configurations were introduced. Alongside a 63-inch (BBC) day-cab, sleeper cab lengths of 90 inches, 101 inches, and 110 inches were offered; sleeper cabs were offered in either a mid-roof or raised-roof configuration (110 inch length). The Argosy shared its 2-piece windshield with the Century Class; a 1-piece windshield (with 3 windshield wipers) was offered as an option.

Carrying over a distinguishing exterior feature from the concept vehicle, the production Argosy offered electrically-powered pivoting entrance steps. Offered on sleeper cabs (alongside a fuel tank fairing), the feature was standard on the driver side and optional on the passenger side. Coinciding with the lowered engine intrusion, the gear shifter was integrated into the dashboard console, allowing walk-in access to the sleeper cab. The Mercedes-Benz engine of the concept vehicle was not used for production, as the Argosy adopted the Cummins ISM, Cat C12, and Detroit Diesel Series 60 inline-6 diesels.

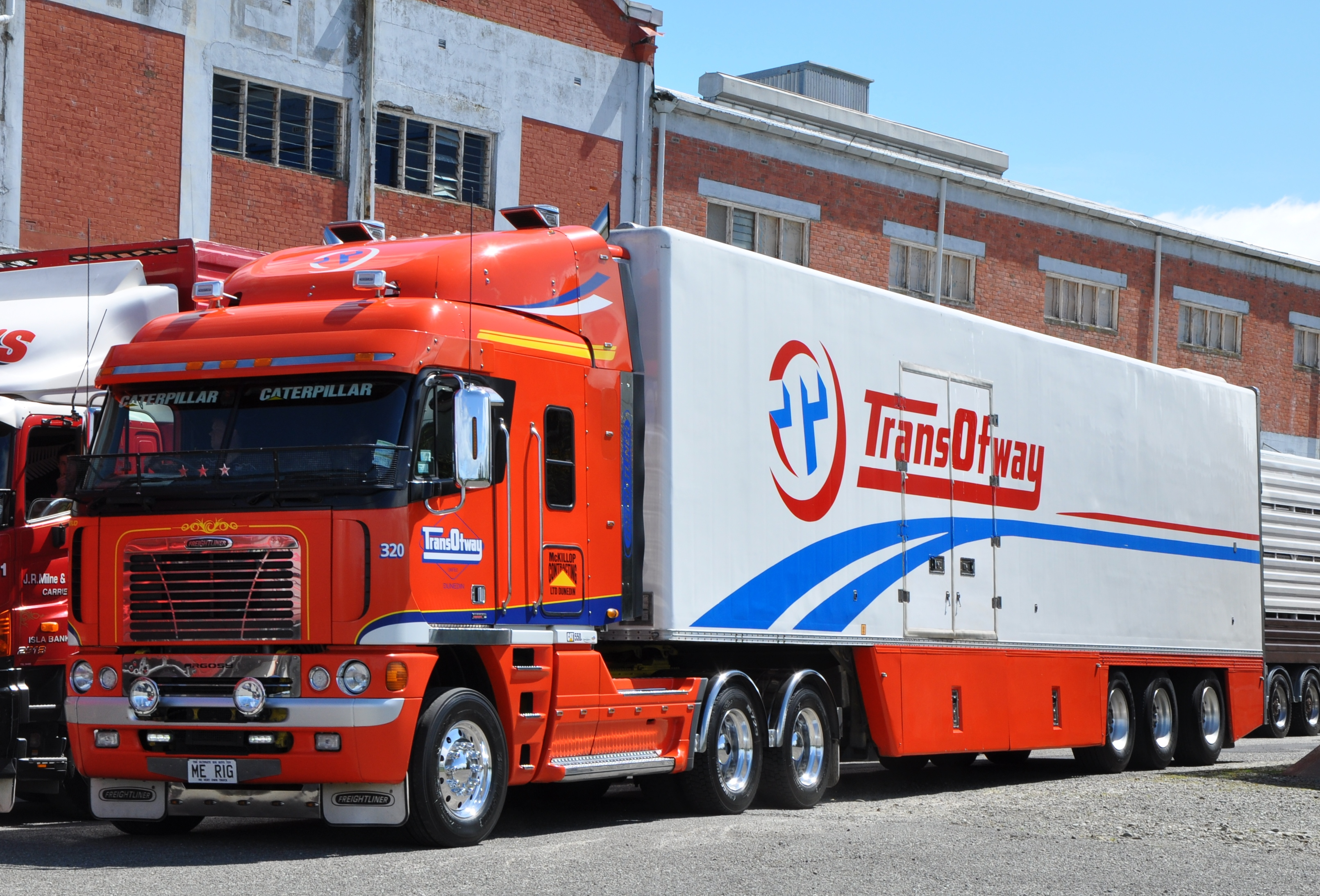
Argosy Evolution (facelift)

In 2006, the Argosy received an optional minor facelift. Marketed as the Argosy Evolution, the original grille (from the Century Class) was replaced with a new unit flush with the bumper vents; the cab corner vents were later updated. The interior received minor revisions as well, and chassis fairings were improved for greater fuel efficiency.

After 2006 production, Freightliner ended sales of the Argosy in the United States and Canada. The final Class 8 COE introduced in North America, the model line was withdrawn after only 7 model years of production, as declining sales of the type led to the discontinuation of competing vehicles from Ford, Kenworth, International, and Peterbilt, respectively.

From 2007 onward, Freightliner continued production of the Argosy entirely for export.

=== Second generation (2012–2020) ===
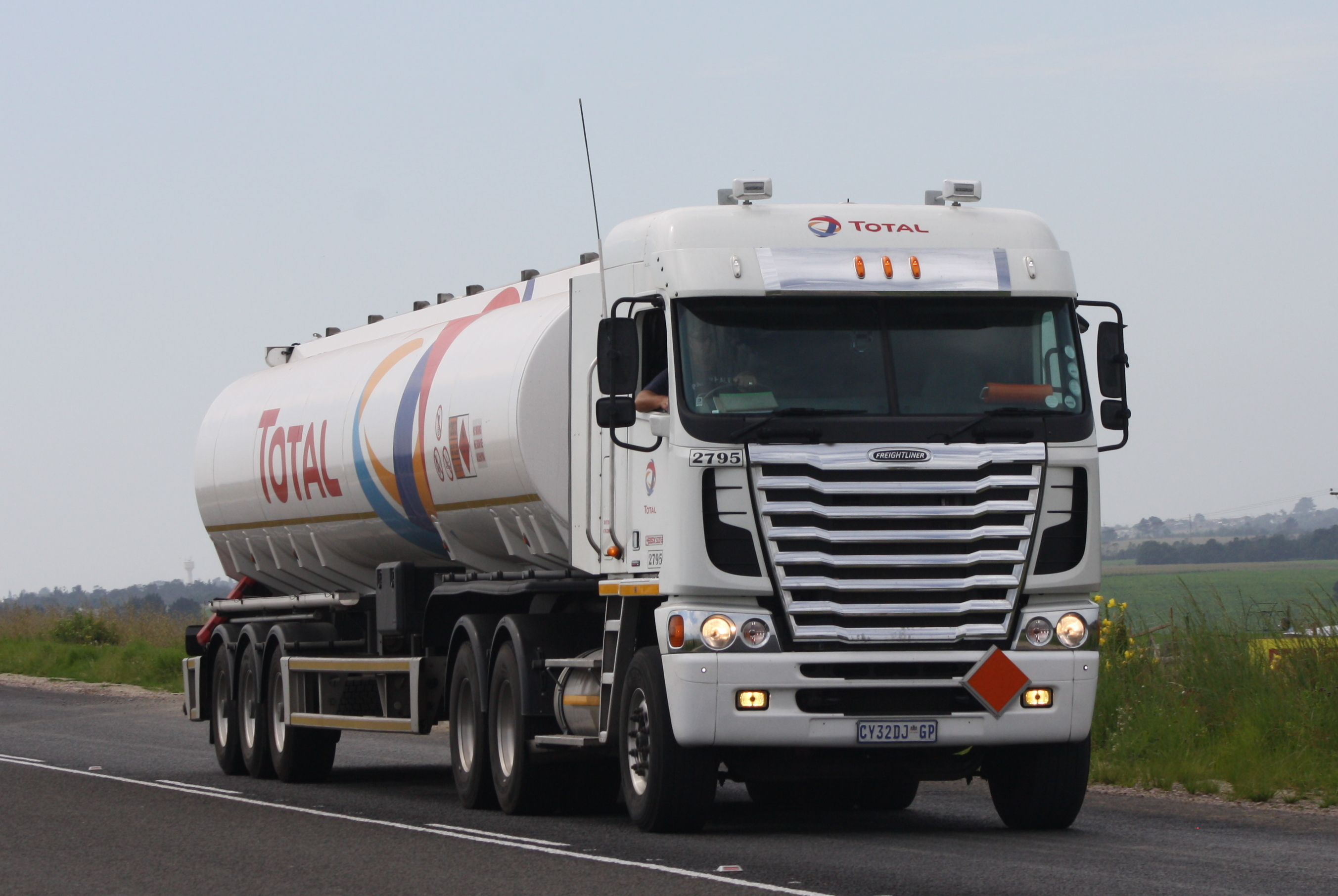
2012 Argosy (South Africa)

For 2012 production, Freightliner introduced a second generation of the Argosy. While again manufactured in the United States, the new generation was developed primarily for sales in export markets (in Australia, the Argosy was the best-selling Freightliner vehicle line). Distinguished by the introduction of a larger grille, the update brought extensive design upgrades, centered around aerodynamic and cooling improvements.

While sharing its underlying cab structure with the first generation, the 2012 Argosy adopted design commonality with the Cascadia (the successor of the Century Class and Columbia), including its drivers' compartment; in a loose preview of the 2018 Cascadia, the Argosy was designed with a trapezoidal grille opening and single-piece door glass (deleting the vent windows). To allow for a larger radiator, the cab was raised slightly; consequently, the previous three-inch floor intrusion was eliminated entirely.

In line with its conventional-style counterpart, the Argosy was powered by either a Cummins ISX or a Detroit Diesel DD15 (the latter, replacing the long-running Series 60). At its launch, 18-speed transmissions were standard, in either manual or automated manual form.

==== Discontinuation ====
In 2020, export of the Argosy to Australia and New Zealand came to a close, ending mass production of the model line in North Carolina; from 1999 to 2020, over 7,500 examples were exported to Australia. The same year, assembly of glider vehicles was discontinued in North America, closing down the Argosy model line completely after 22 years.

As of current production, the Argosy has not been replaced by an equivalent product line in North America since 2006. Freightliner Australia has commenced sales of a right-hand drive version of the Cascadia; also sourced from North America, the Cascadia is a hooded (bonneted) truck, less advantageous under trailer length laws. Outside of North America, the Mercedes-Benz Actros COE (also sold by Freightliner corporate parent Daimler AG) is within the same market segment as the Argosy, but weighs significantly more than a similarly-configured Argosy.

== Glider truck marketing ==
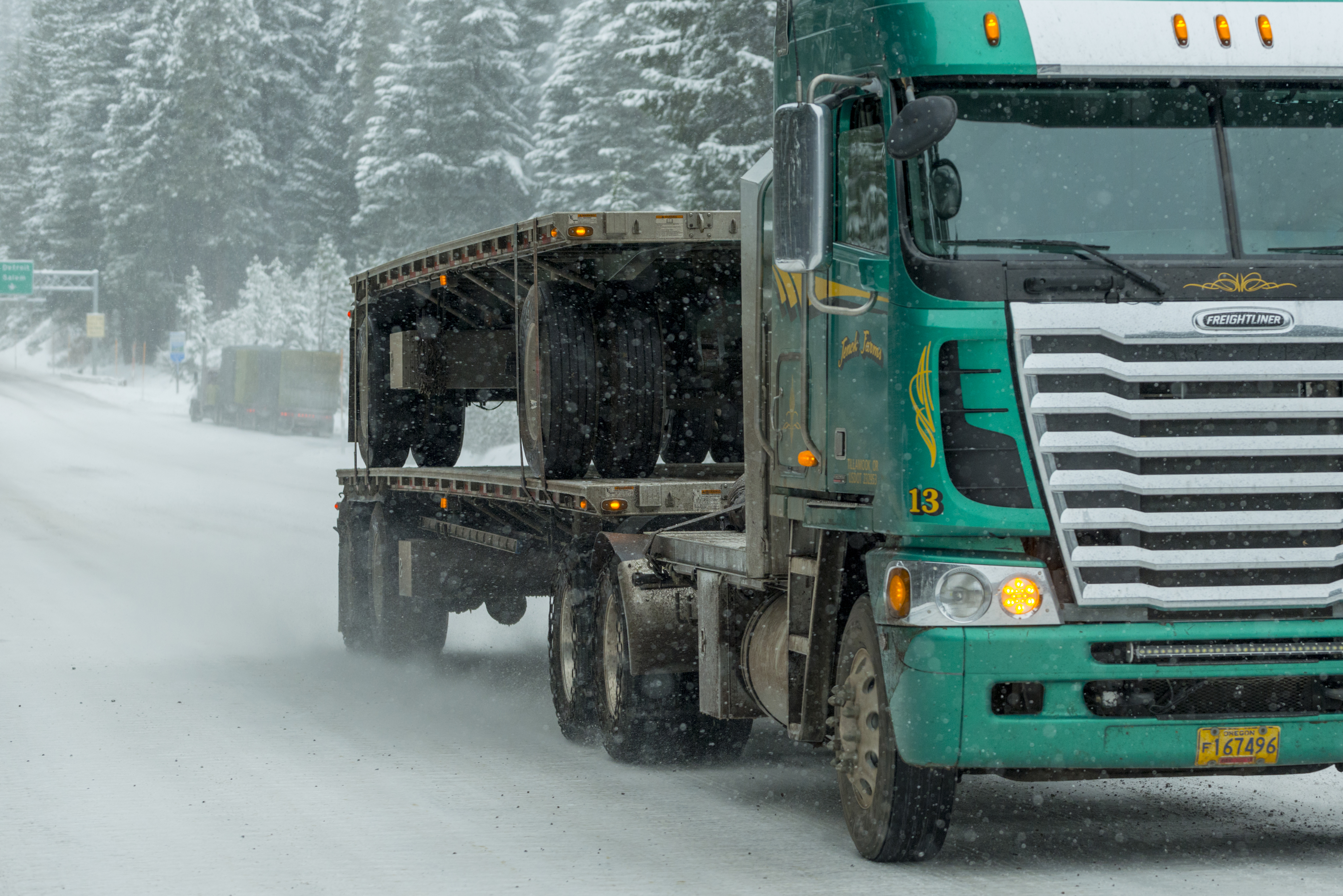
Later 2010s Argosy in United States (glider truck construction)

From 2007 onward, Freightliner continued to market the Argosy in North America. Instead of mass producing the vehicle, it was offered as a glider vehicle. In contrast to an incomplete vehicle (sold to a second party to finish its body), a glider vehicle is constructed as a vehicle designed to be completed with customer-supplied major components (typically, engine, transmission, and axles supplied from a previous compatible vehicle). While a means to continue the use of serviceable powertrains, the method is criticized as a loophole to circumvent emissions regulations.

As a glider truck, the Argosy remained available in North America alongside the Columbia, Coronado, Cascadia, and M2. Following its redesign for 2012, the Argosy continued as a glider truck in North America, adopting the second-generation design.

In 2020, Freightliner ended production of glider vehicles entirely, leading to the closure of the model line.

== Export use ==
As part of its development, the Argosy was intended to comply with European crashworthiness standards, becoming one of the safest trucks tested of the time. Outside of North America, trailer length laws remained more restrictive than in the United States and Canada, leading to continued demand for shorter-length cabover trucks. In response, during its entire production, the Freightliner Argosy was produced for export markets, with Freightliner primarily focusing on South Africa, Australia, and New Zealand.

From 1999 to 2020, export versions of the Argosy were assembled in Cleveland, North Carolina. Initially produced for export in CKD kits, Freightliner shifted towards export of completely assembled vehicles in the early 2000s. Along with their right-hand drive configuration, export versions of the Argosy offer several configurations not offered in North America, including twin-steer front axles (largely used on Western Star severe-service trucks), grille/bumper guards, and axle layouts configured for road trains (multiple trailer configurations are comparatively rare in North America).

In 2014, sales of the Argosy in South Africa were discontinued, leaving Australia and New Zealand as the sole markets for the model line. During 2018, Freightliner Australia announced it would withdraw the model line during 2020, replacing it with a right-hand drive Cascadia.

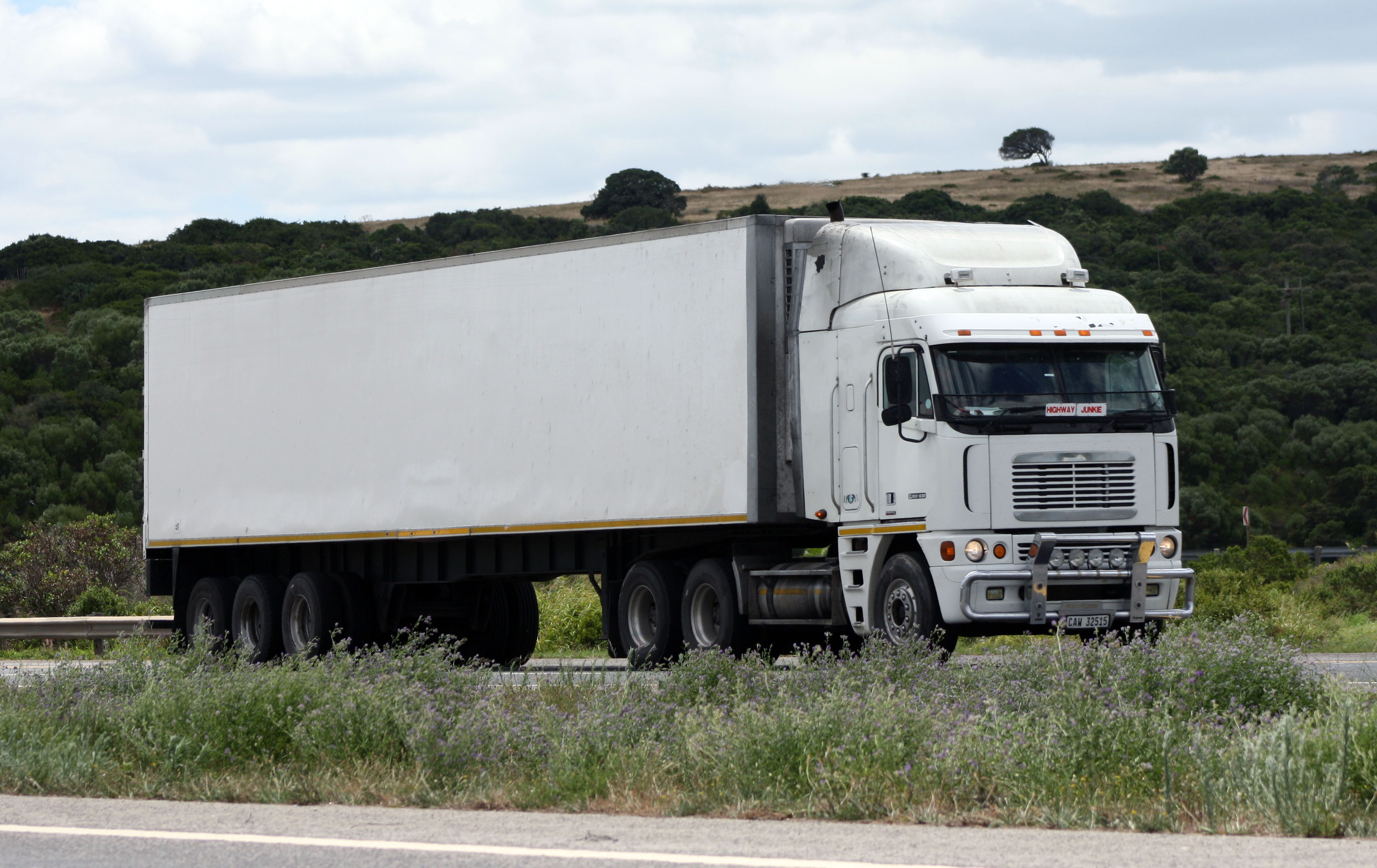
First-generation Argosy in South Africa

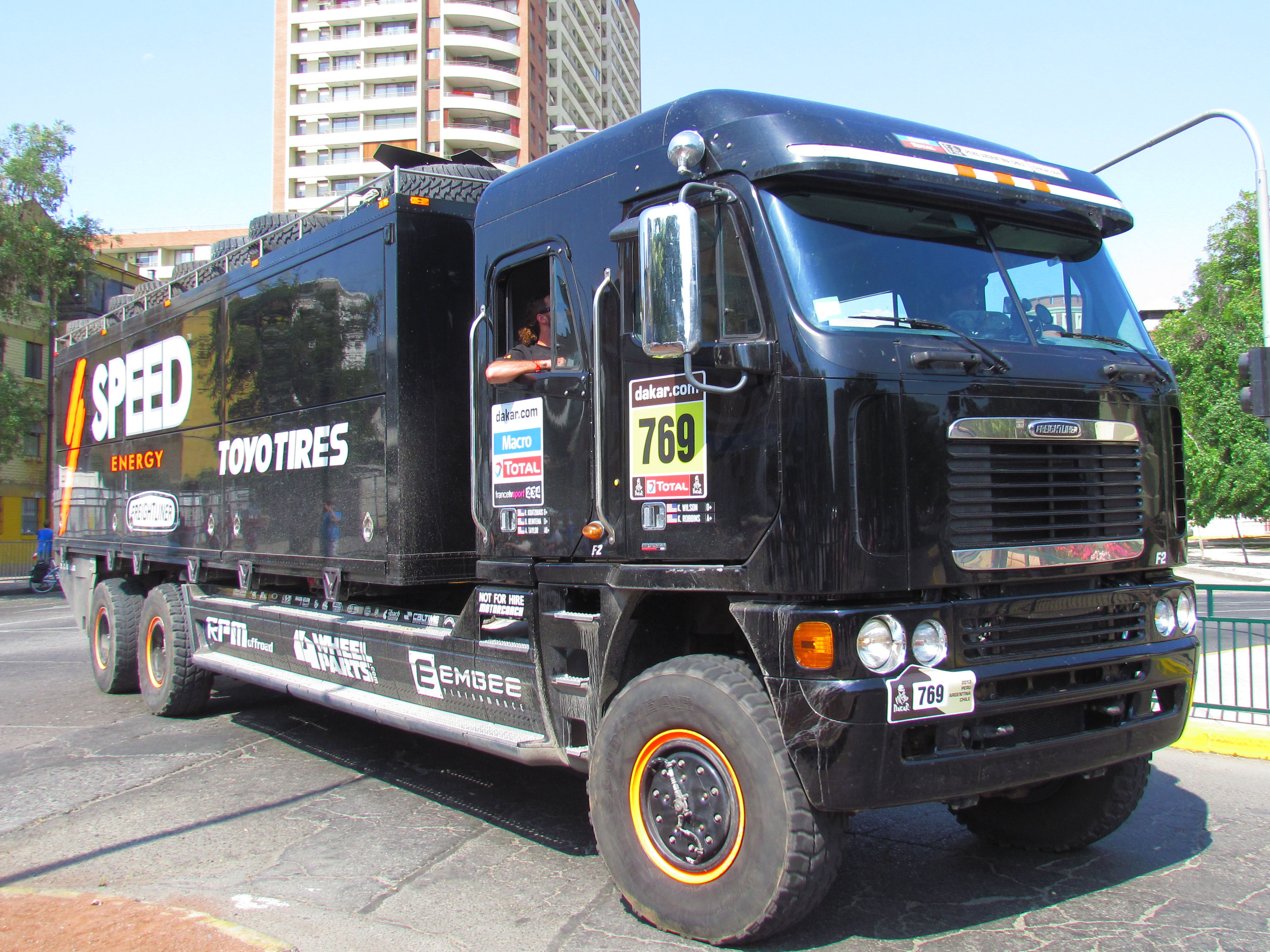
Argosy crew-cab in Chile (aftermarket conversion of sleeper cab)

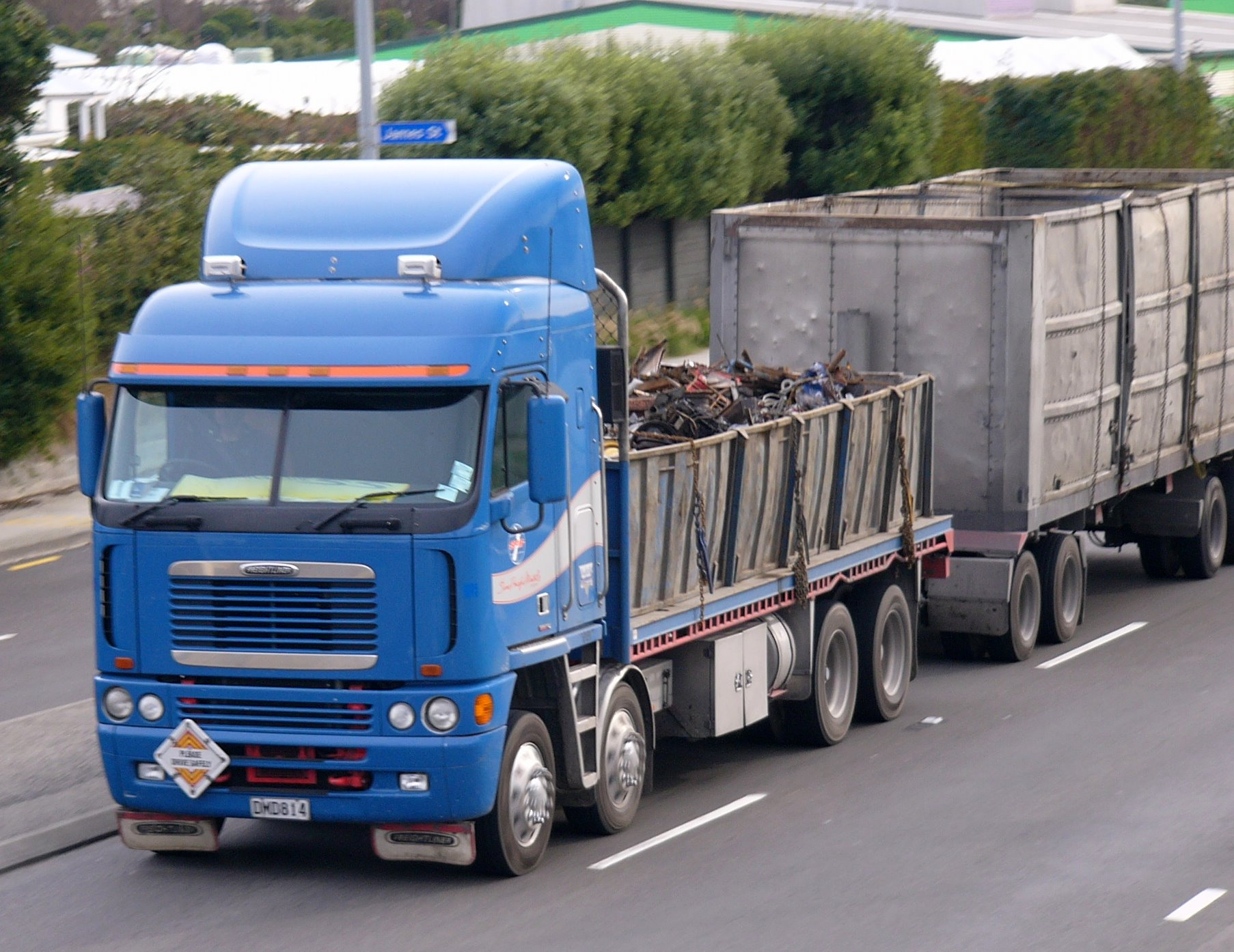
2006 Argosy 8x4 twin-steer flatbed towing trailer in New Zealand

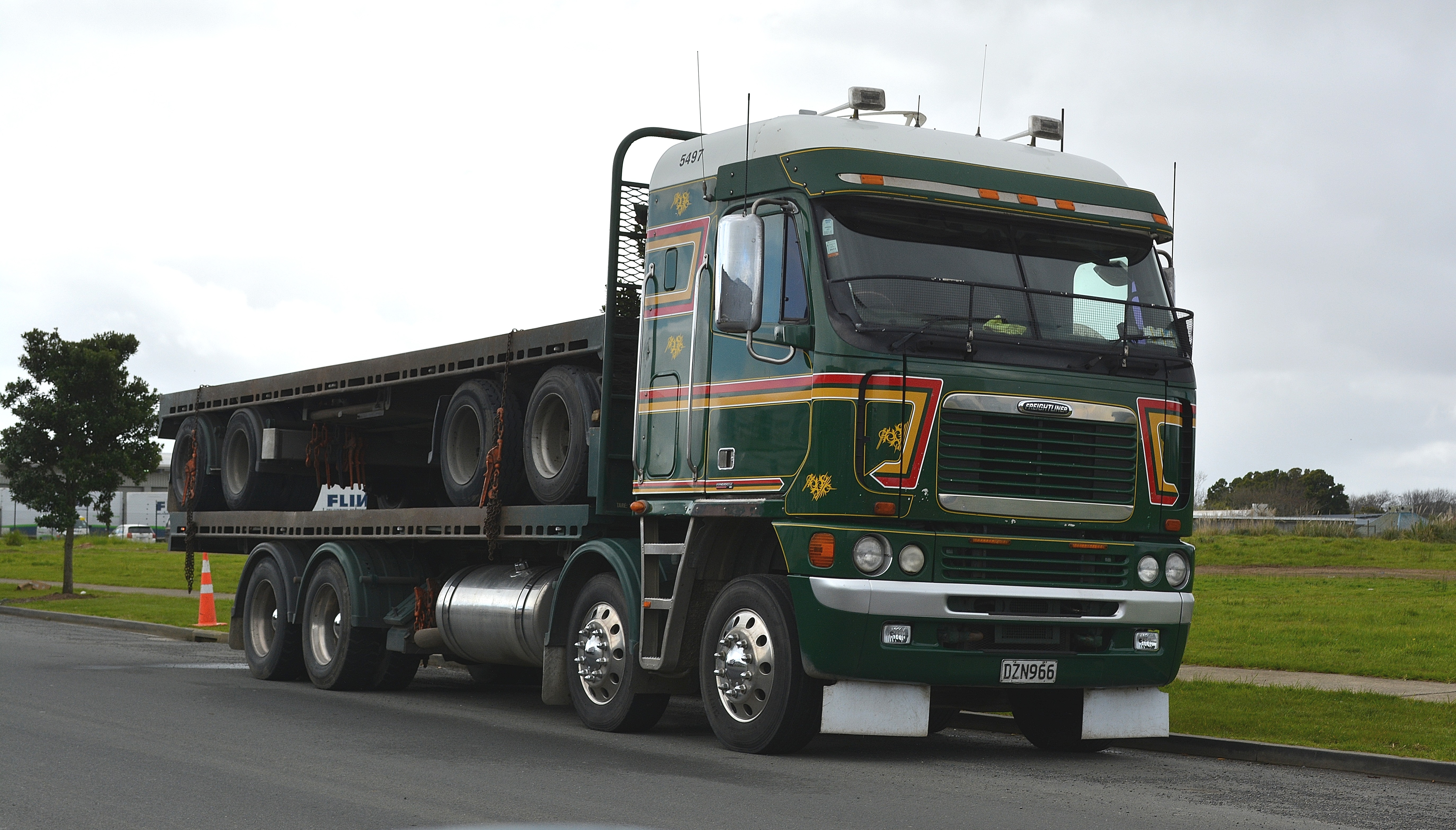
2007 Argosy 8x4 twin-steer in New Zealand transporting flatbed trailer

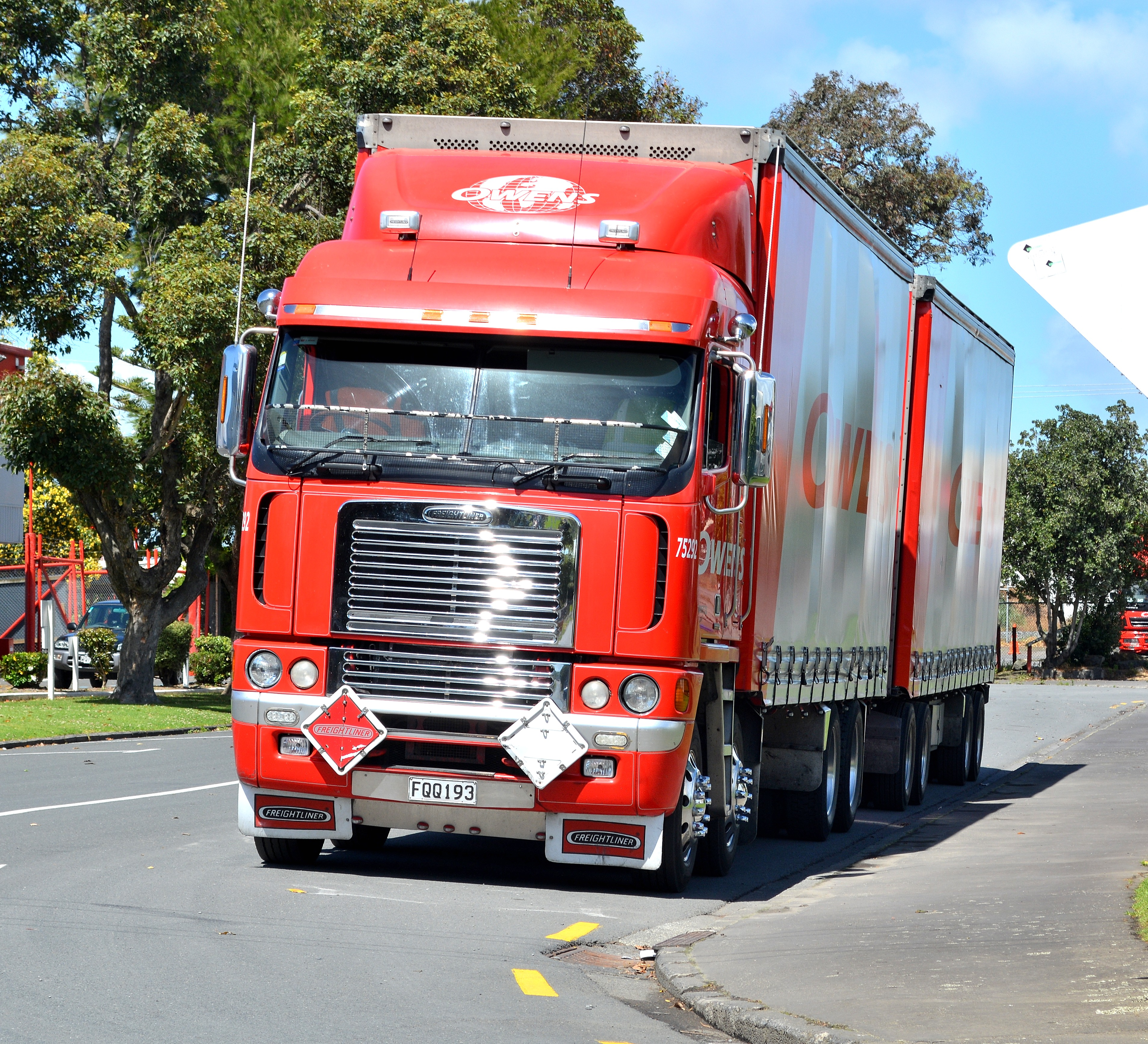
Argosy Evolution front fascia

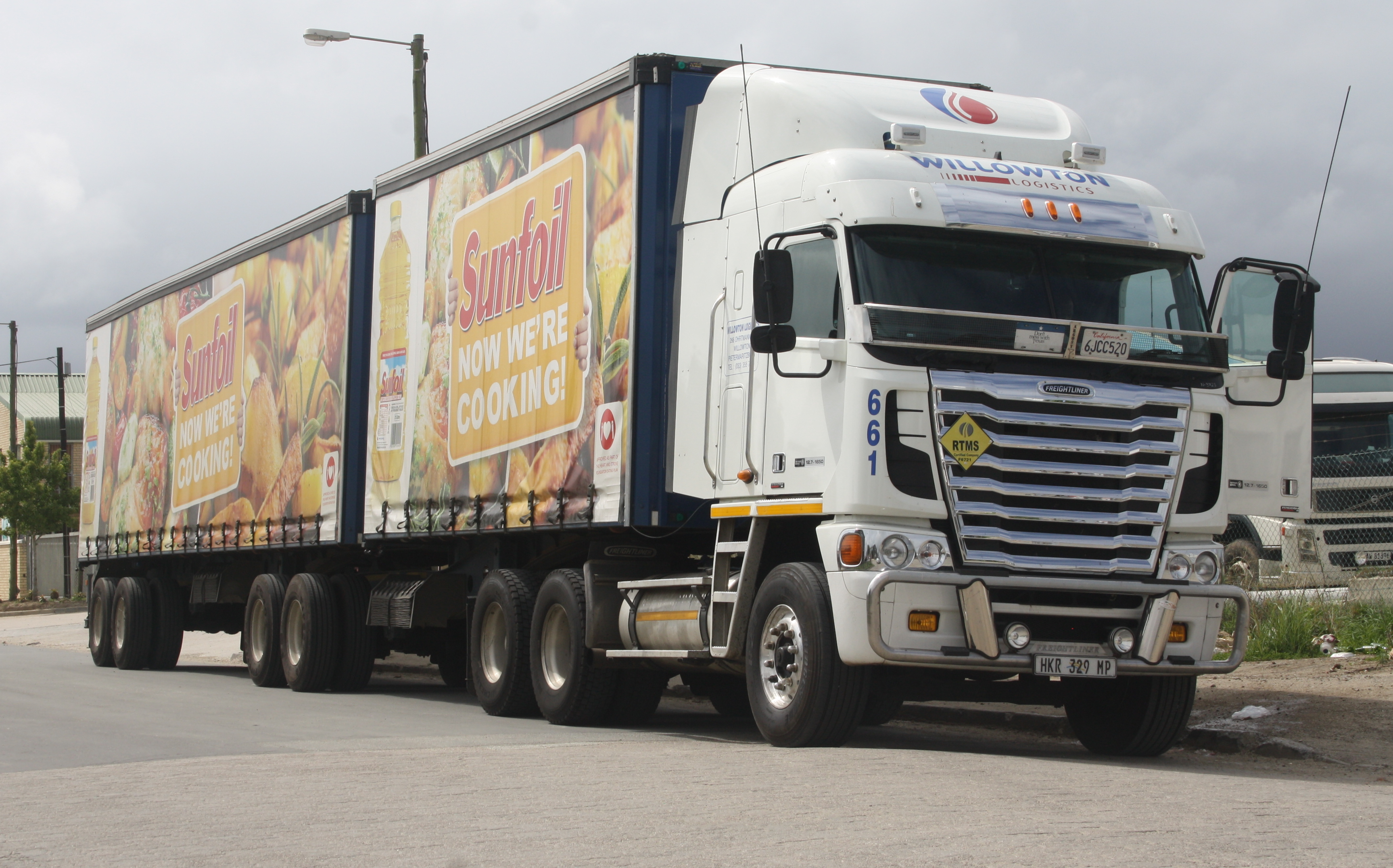
Second-generation Argosy towing tandem trailers in South Africa
