= Freightliner Coronado =

Motor vehicle

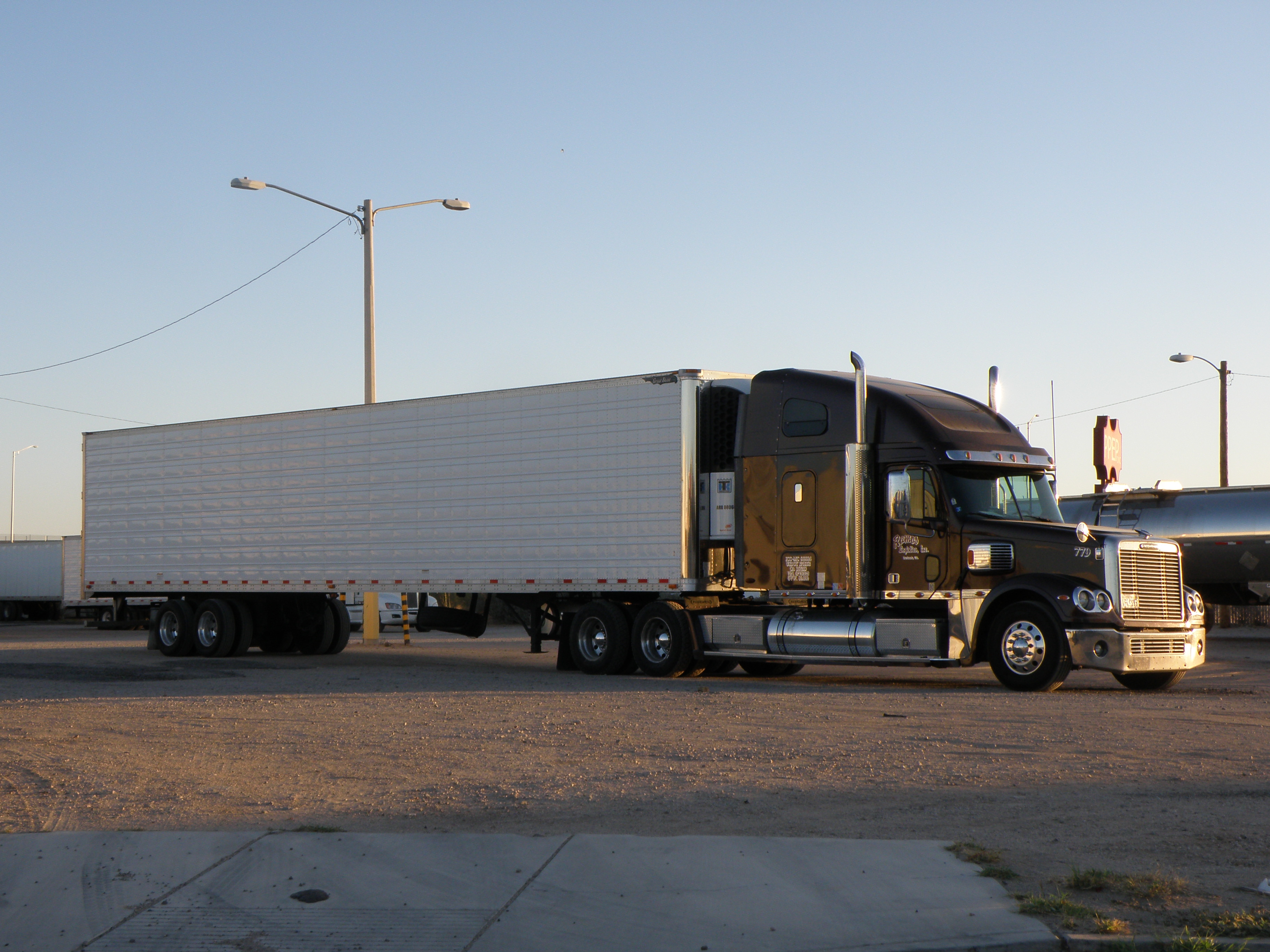
First generation Coronado with a trailer (United States)

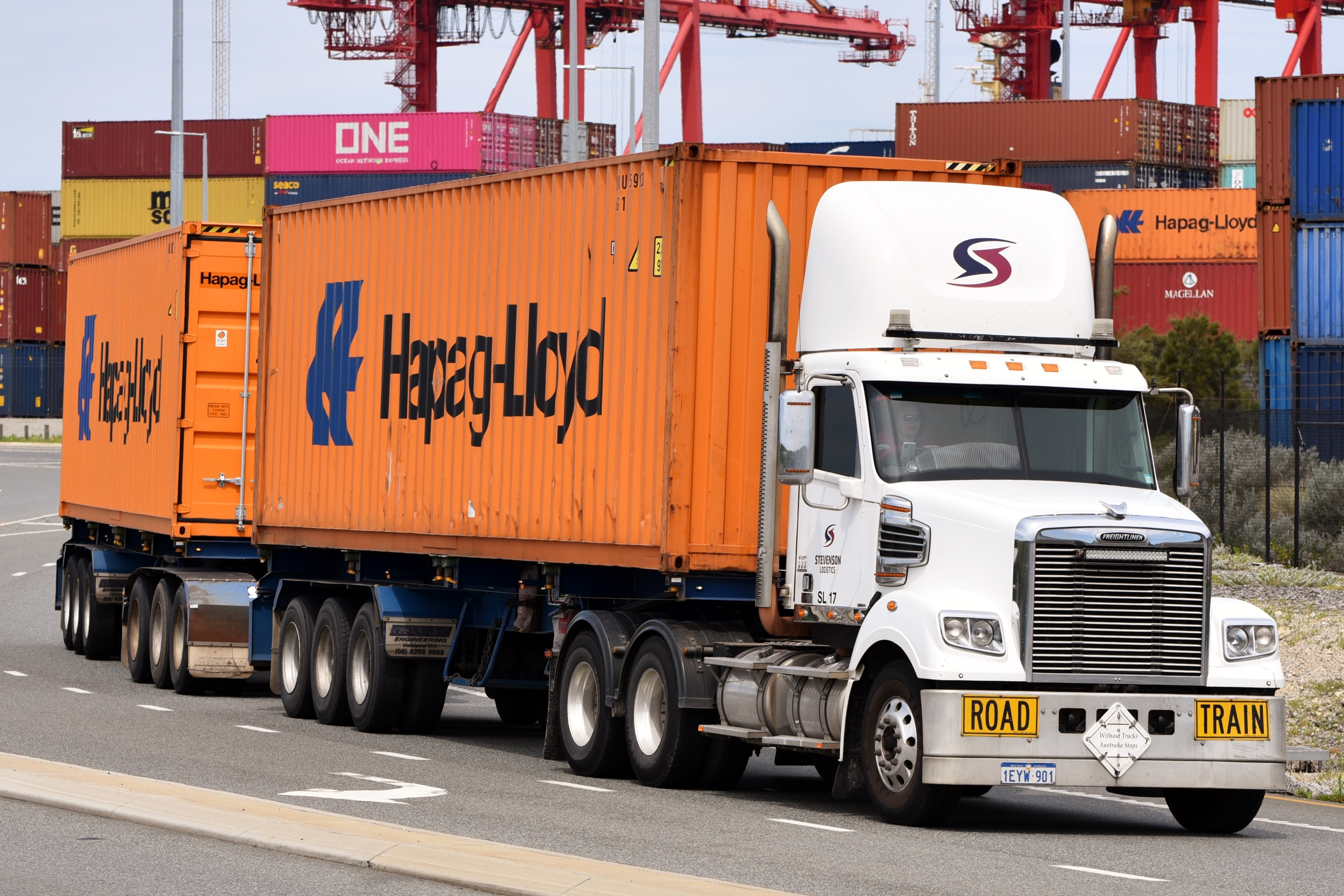
A second generation Freightliner Coronado hauling containers (Australia)

The Freightliner Coronado is a Class 8 conventional truck, intended for long haul and vocational use. It was introduced in January 2001, with production starting for the 2002 model year. It featured Cummins, Caterpillar, and Detroit engine options. That generation was discontinued in 2010 to make way for a second; however, the first generation remains available as a glider, referred to as the 122SD. It is available with Day cab and Sleeper cab. The Coronado was not replaced by the CA125 Cascadia, manly because the Cascadia was a modern successor to the Century.
