= Freightliner Century Class =

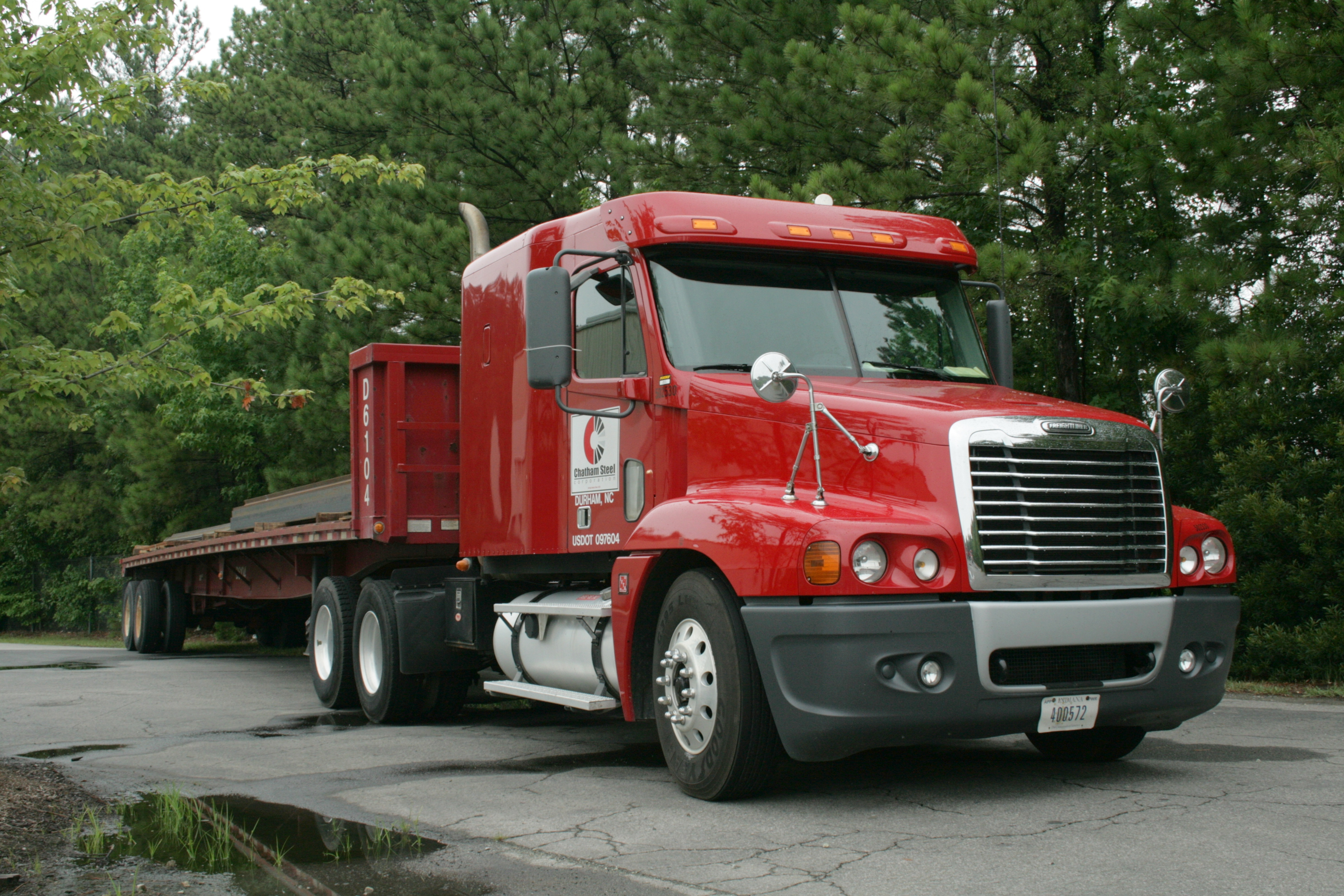
- 2005–2010 (facelift) flat roof sleeper Century

Overview
- Manufacturer: Freightliner
- Also called: Freightliner Century Class S/T; Freightliner Century Class CST112 (Australia)
- Production: 1995–2010 (North America, 1996–2010 model years), 1998–2020 for export markets 1995–present as a glider truck kit

Body and chassis
- Class: Heavy Duty Class 8 Truck
- Body style: Conventional Day Cab, Sleeper Truck
- Related: Freightliner Columbia, Freightliner Argosy

Powertrain
- Engine: Caterpillar C13; Caterpillar C15; Caterpillar 3406E; Detroit Diesel MBE 4000; Detroit Diesel Series 60; Detroit Diesel DD13/15/16; Cummins ISX; Cummins N14
- Transmission: Eaton 8, 9, 10, 13,& 18 speed manual Eaton UltraShift automated manual Allison 4500 RDS automatic

Chronology
- Predecessor: Freightliner FLD
- Successor: Freightliner Cascadia

The Freightliner Century Class is a Class 8 truck that was produced by Freightliner from 1996 to 2010. The inaugural model of the C-Series family of Freightliner conventional-hood trucks, the Century Class replaced the FLD conventional (which dated to 1987). The model line is an aerodynamic-style sloped-hood conventional, fitted with either a day cab or rear sleeper cab.

The Century Class remained in production in the United States until 2010 as the Freightliner Cascadia replaced it as the second generation of the C-Series family. The Century Class remained in production for export markets through 2020, when it was replaced by the Columbia CL112 and the Cascadia (which also replaced the Freightliner Argosy COE).

== Background ==
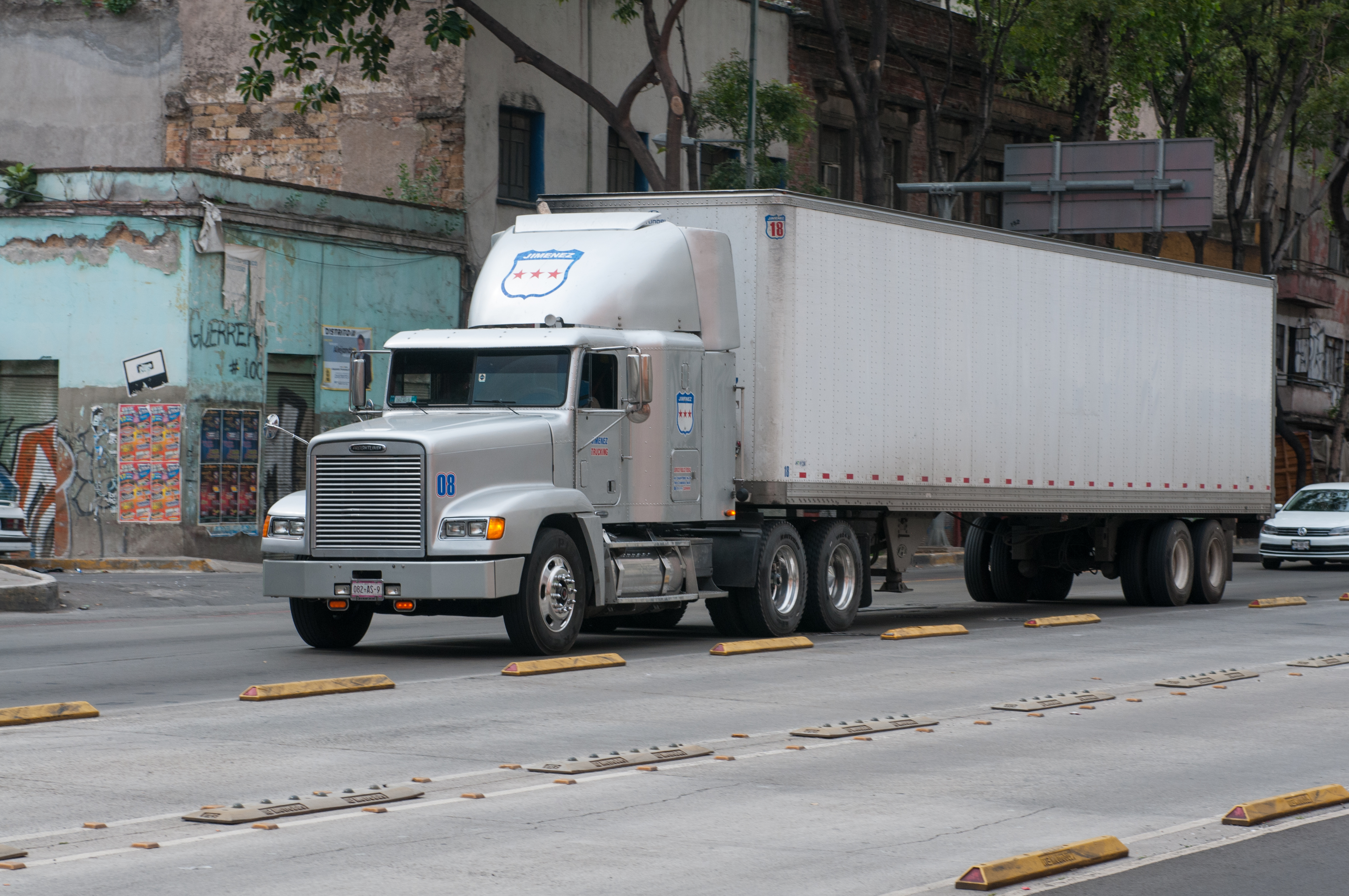
Freightliner FLD120, predecessor line to Century Class

In 1981, Freightliner changed ownership, changing hands from trucking company Consolidated Freightways (its founder) to Daimler AG. During the 1980s, Daimler instituted several major changes within the company. After only entering production of conventional-cab trucks in 1974, the company began to expand production of its Class 8 line; truck-length deregulation would lead to the near-disappearance of COE trucks in North America by the end of the 20th century.

In 1985, Freightliner introduced the Business Class truck range. The first vocational truck produced by the brand, the FLC 112 mated a Mercedes-Benz LKN (low-cab COE) cab with an all-new conventional chassis. In 1991, the Business Class was expanded, adding the medium-duty FL-Series (replacing the long-running Mercedes-Benz L-Series trucks in North America), again mating a Mercedes-Benz cab with a Freightliner-hood chassis.

Though the main FLD120 was an aerodynamic conventional, its fundamental structure dated back to 1977. In the early 1990s, the C-Series became the first Freightliner model family designed from the ground up by Daimler AG. Though not marketed in Europe (a region that does not favor hooded-style trucks), the Century Class/C120 was developed in response to meet European crash-test requirements. Along with introducing safety advances, development sought to lower overall cost of operation, seeking to reduce the number of maintenance points and reduce overall fuel consumption.

== Model overview ==
=== Century Class (C120) ===
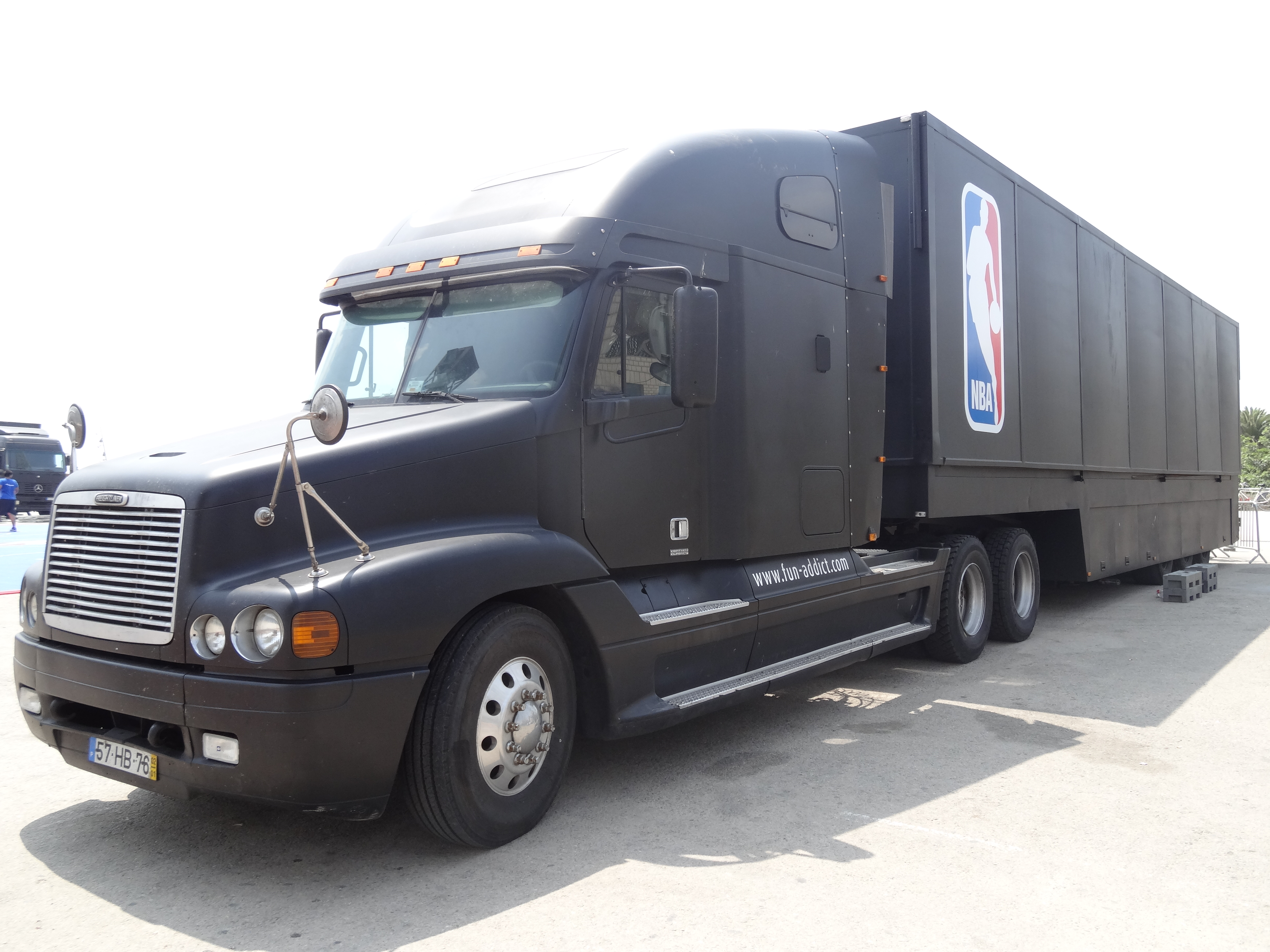
2000-2005 Freightliner Century Class S/T (high-roof sleeper cab)

Introduced in 1995 for 1996 production, the Century Class shared the 120-inch BBC length of the FLD120. Distinguished by its four separate headlamps, the model line was among the first large trucks to increase the use of onboard telematics; at the time, the vehicle had engine data logging, optional onboard messaging capability, and optional telephone and fax systems.

For 2000, the model line was revised, becoming the Century Class S/T (S/T = Safety and Technology). The S/T package added a driver's side air bag and improved seat mounting restraints. The Century Class S/T was also offered with a Driver's Lounge and Backpack option. The Backpack option was an added fiberglass hump added to the outside of a rear cab sleeper model that provided additional interior storage space between the bunks.

For 2005 production, the Century Class S/T underwent a facelift for the first time. To accommodate the air intake requirements of upgraded emissions standards, the intake area of the grille was increased significantly in size (extending into the bumper). To increase visibility (and simplify replacement), all headlamp, driving, and foglamp bulbs were replaced by replaceable composite bulbs. Though fitted with a larger, freer-flowing grille, the facelifted Century Class S/T saw no aerodynamic penalties from the update to its overall profile.

For 2010, the Century Class was retired in North America, replaced by the Freightliner Cascadia (introduced for 2008). The model remained in production for export sales through 2020.

== Variants ==
=== Columbia (CL120) ===
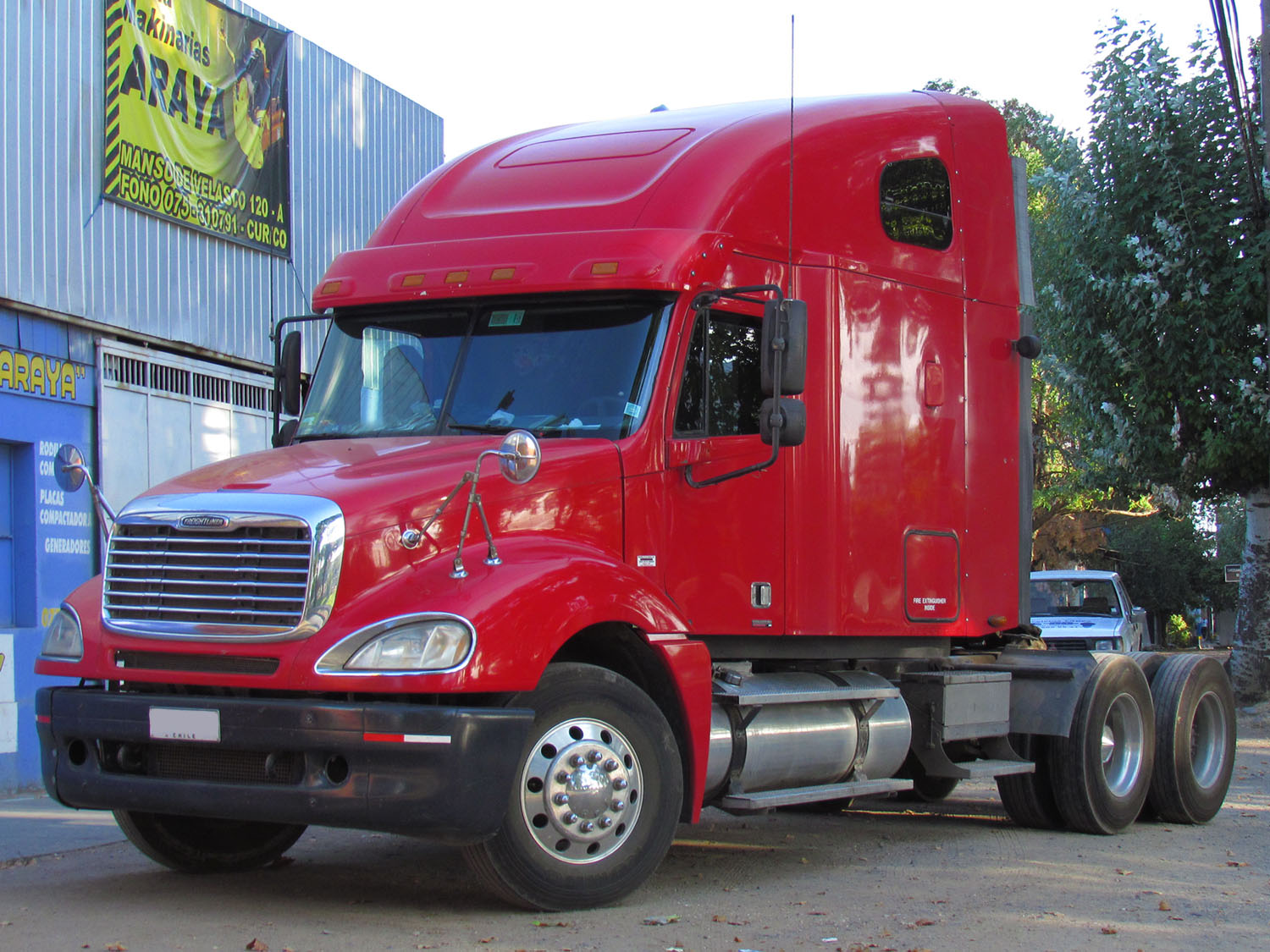
2010 Freightliner Columbia

For 2002 production, the Freightliner Columbia became a second aerodynamic conventional for the C-Series family. Sharing its cab structure with the Century Class, the Columbia was distinguished by its teardrop-shaped headlamps (styled like the Freightliner M2) and smaller grille.

In contrast to the Century Class, the Columbia was developed primarily for fleet applications, alongside usage by owner-operator customers.

=== Coronado (CC132) ===
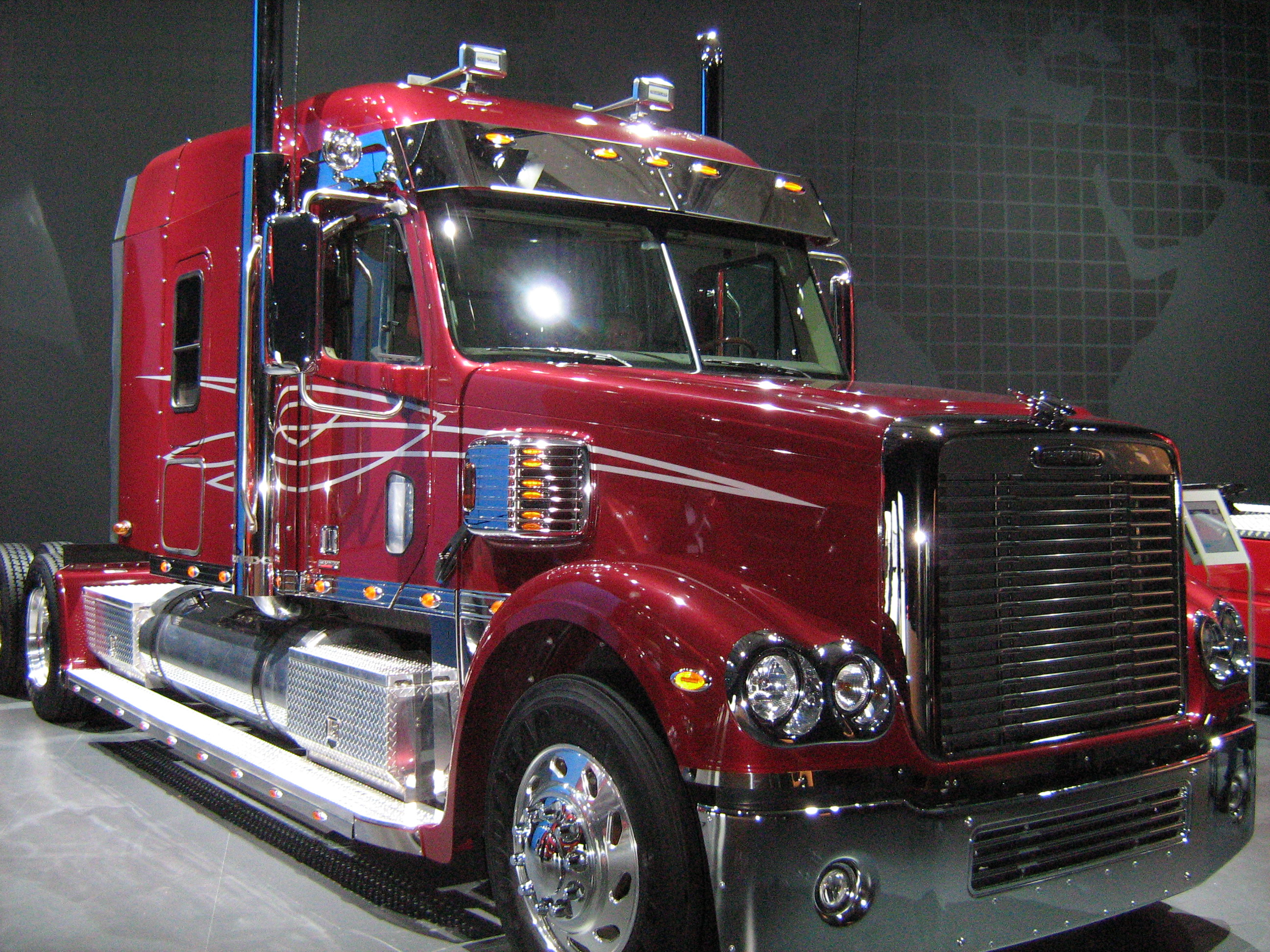
2008 Freightliner Coronado

For 2002 production, the Freightliner Coronado was introduced as a third model for the C-Series family. Serving as a 21st-century version of the FLD 132 (Classic XL), the Coronado shared its cab structure with the Century Class and Columbia, but was fitted with an extended-length hood with a large rectangular chrome grille, external air intakes, and chrome-trimmed headlamps.

Two versions of the Coronado were produced. In 2010, the model was restyled with trapezoidal headlamp bezels; this was later named the 122SD in North America. Currently, the 2002-2010 Coronado remains in production as a glider-kit truck.

=== Argosy ===
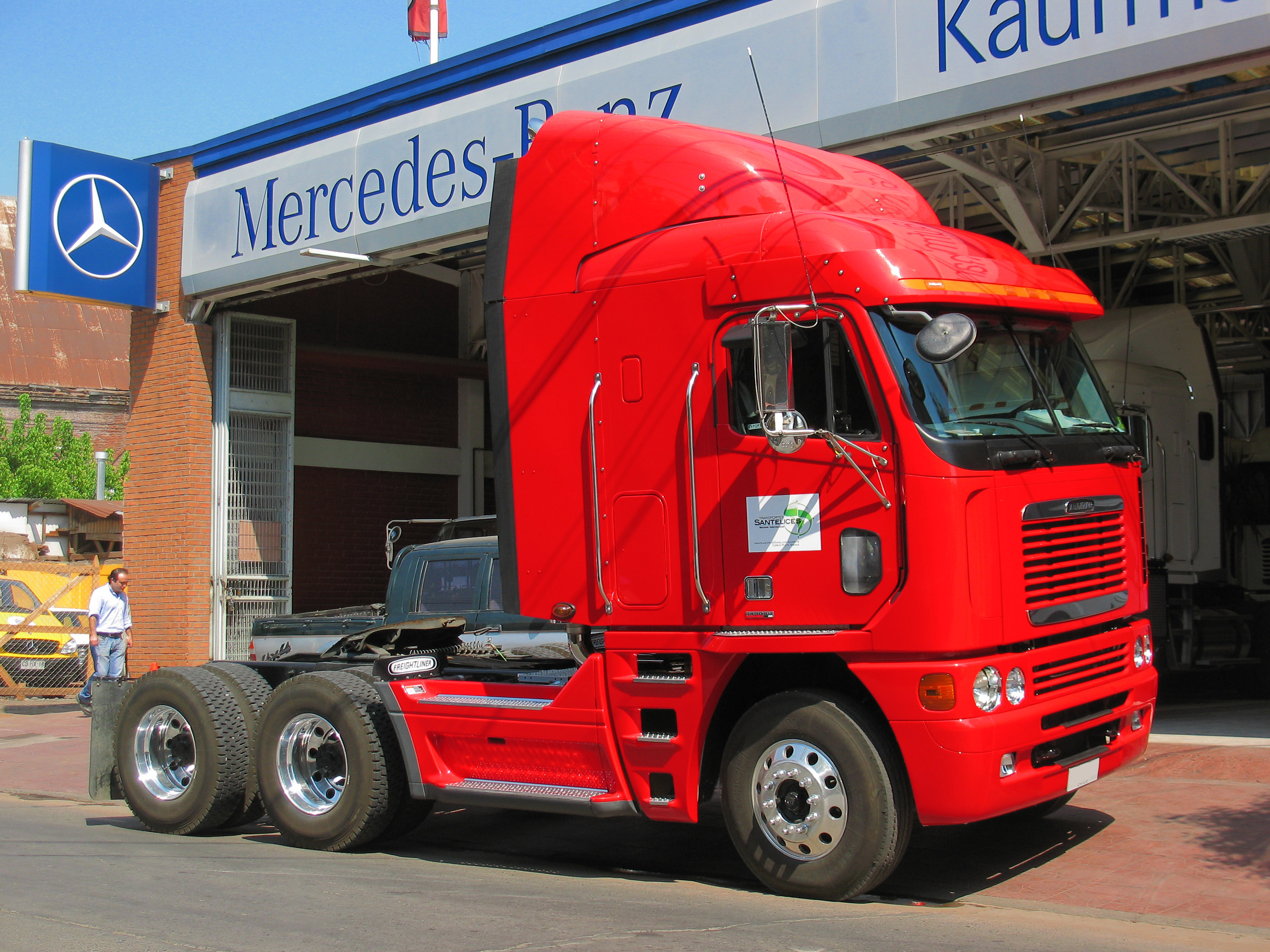
2011 Freightliner Argosy

Introduced for 1998, the Freightliner Argosy COE replaced the 1980s FLA/FLB COE lines. Along with sharing a visual resemblance with the Century Class (with both trucks sharing multiple structural components), the Argosy also shared its onboard telematics with the Century Class. One of the most advanced COE designs ever produced in North America, the vehicle was produced with an engine intrusion only 3 inches high (effectively creating a flat interior floor).

The Freightliner Argosy was the final COE design to be introduced and sold in North America, with Freightliner ending sales of factory-assembled vehicles after 2006; alongside export production, the Argosy remained available as a glider truck through 2020.
