= Mercedes-Benz OM457 engine =

Mercedes-Benz OM 457
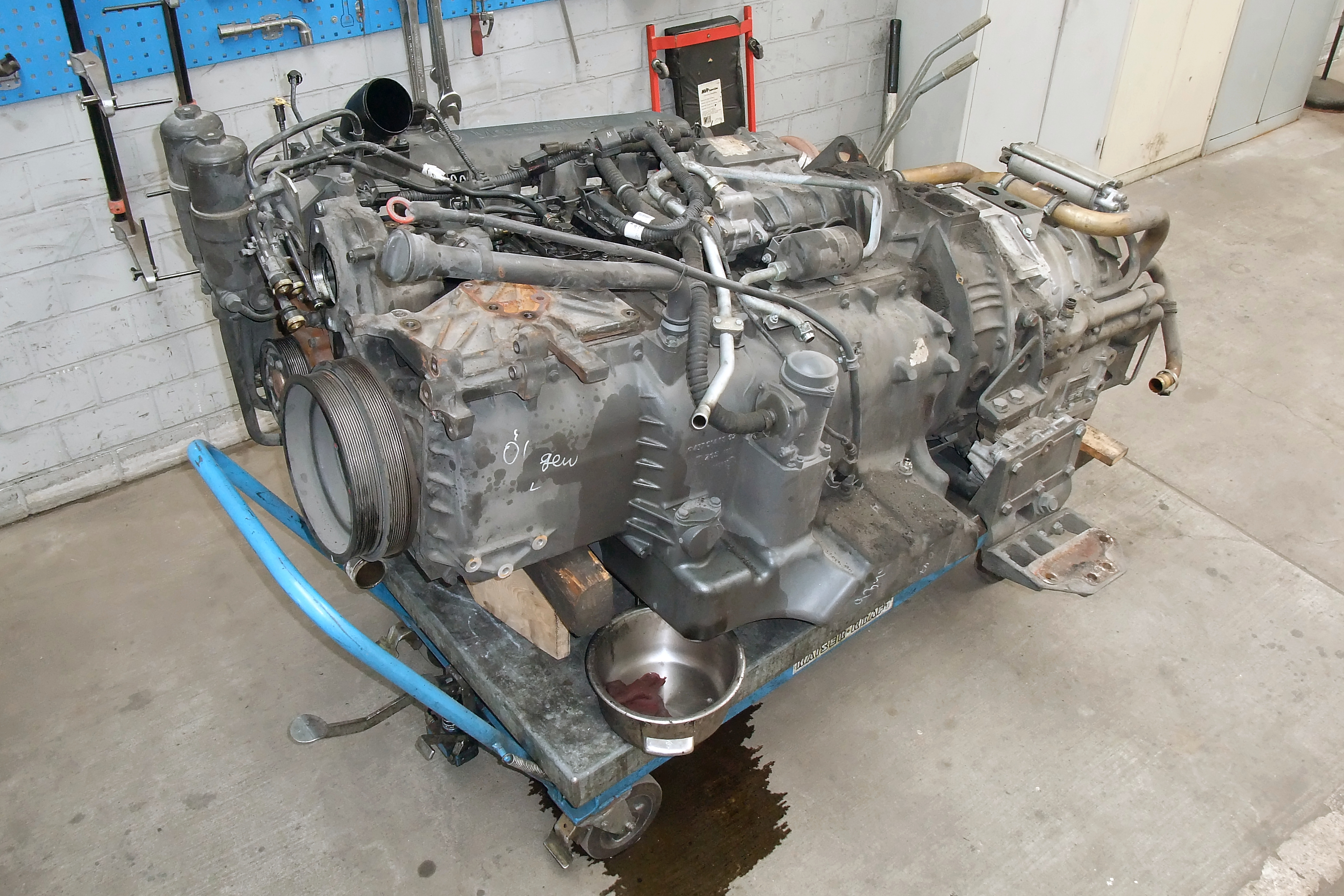

Overview
- Manufacturer: Mercedes-Benz
- Production: since 1998

Layout
- Configuration: Inline-6
- Displacement: 12.0 L (11,967 cc)
- Cylinder bore: 128 mm (5.0 in)
- Piston stroke: 155 mm (6.1 in)
- Cylinder block material: cast iron
- Cylinder head material: cast iron
- Valvetrain: OHV
- Compression ratio: 18.5:1

RPM range
- Idle speed: 560
- Max. engine speed: 2300

Combustion
- Turbocharger: 1 × BorgWarner, no VGT
- Fuel system: Unit injectors
- Management: Electronic
- Fuel type: Diesel fuel 51 CZ, DIN EN 590 or EN 14214
- Cooling system: Water-cooled

Output
- Power output: 185–335 kW (252–455 PS; 248–449 hp)
- Torque output: 1.1–2.2 kN⋅m (811–1,623 lb⋅ft)

Dimensions
- Length: 1,316 mm (51.8 in)
- Width: 746 mm (29.4 in)
- Height: 1,019 mm (40.1 in)
- Dry weight: 1,045 kg (2,304 lb)

Emissions
- Emissions target standard: Up to Euro V or IMO IV
- Emissions control systems: Selective catalytic reduction (BlueTEC) with Diesel exhaust fluid

Chronology
- Predecessor: OM447
- Successor: OM460 (Upstroked version to 12.8 L), OM471

The Mercedes-Benz OM457 Engine is a 12.0 L (11,967 cc) displacement inline 6-cylinder 4-stroke Diesel engine. It is one of many motors in the 400 series of engines, being an improved, electronically managed version of the OM447. The OM457 has many applications, including trucks, marine, military, municipal, bus and agricultural vehicles, as well as stationary settings. The engine has many differing trim and power levels, ranging from around 250 to 450 horsepower, as well as both a vertically mounted and, for buses, a horizontally mounted version (denominated OM 457 hLA).

The engine is water-cooled and is produced using a cast-iron cylinder block, with removable wet type cylinder liners. The engine utilizes diesel fuel delivered in a direct injection method from individual electronically-controlled and camshaft-actuated unit pumps. The cylinder heads are separate units for each cylinder.

The crankshaft is a precision forged unit running in seven three-layer bearings, with counterweights bolted onto the crank webs, much like any other diesel motor of its vintage. The middle bearing is also the thrust bearing. The connecting rods are of a split design, with bronze bushings for the piston pin.

Data	value
Mercedes-Benz Type	OM
Model	457.951 LA
Combustion cycle	Four-stroke diesel with direct injection
Number and arrangement of cylinders	vertical inline-6
Bore × Stroke, Displacement	128 mm × 155 mm (5.0 in × 6.1 in), 12.0 L (11,967 cc)
Compression ratio	18.5:1
Rated power	260 kW (354 PS; 349 hp) at 2000 rpm
Maximum torque	1.6 kN⋅m (1,180 lb⋅ft) at 1100 rpm
Cylinder firing order	1 - 5 - 3 - 6 - 2 - 4
Maximum pressure of injection nozzles	1,800 bar (26,000 psi)
Max. operating temperature	100 °C (212 °F)
Oil pressure	nominal 2–5 bar (29–73 psi), idle min 0.5 bar (7.3 psi)
Weight, dry	1,045 kg (2,304 lb)

== Bibliography ==
- DaimlerChrysler: Powersystems • Industrial Engines Maintenance and Repair Series 457, 500 and 900 Advanced Training. May 2003
