= Glider (automobiles) =

Vehicle without a powertrain

In the United States, with regard to automobiles, a glider is a vehicle without a powertrain (especially without an engine). Gliders are generally sold as unused car bodies, but a second-hand car may also be stripped of its powertrain and sold as a glider. The purpose of such a vehicle is to be used as a base for a non-standard powertrain, to create a novel variation of a conventional vehicle, custom car, exotic vehicle, or homemade electric vehicle conversion. The term is analogous to an aircraft with no engine being a glider.

== Glider kit ==
A glider kit is a term for a kit used to restore or reconstruct a wrecked or dismantled truck or tractor unit. All glider kits include a frame, front axle, and body (cab). The kit may also contain other optional components.

A motor vehicle constructed from a glider kit is titled as a new vehicle in the United States. An exception to this is the state of Georgia where, when issued, for a tractor cab restored with a glider kit will always be branded "Rebuilt".

== Glider truck ==
A glider truck is manufactured in the United States using a new frame from an original equipment manufacturer and a glider kit. A "pre-emissions" engine which does not meet current EPA emissions standards for a new tractor trailer may be installed. The required exhaust gas recirculation (EGR) technology is replaced by an older engine which doesn't have it, called a "pre-EGR engine."

Production of heavy duty glider trucks was estimated to be 10,000 in 2015, 4% of all sales. An Obama-era limit on production of 300 units yearly was lifted by the Trump administration. This change by the EPA was widely condemned by environmental groups and was withdrawn by Scott Pruitt's interim replacement facing the prospect of a likely loss in court.

== Used glider ==
One can obtain a glider by modifying a used car. Parts removed from the vehicle include:

- A/C & A/C condenser
- Air intake/cleaner
- Alternator
- Battery
- Brakes/Master cylinder
- Clutch
- Computer(s)
- Engine
- Flywheel
- Gas tank, with fuel pipe and pumps and sensors
- Heat panels
- Heater core
- Ignition
- Mount brackets
- Muffler system
- Power steering
- Radiator
- Radiator fan
- Radiator reservoirs
- Radio
- Spare tire
- Starter
- Suspension
- Transmission
- Warning lights and gauges
- Wiper fluid reservoir
- Wire

== See also ==
- Electric vehicle conversion
- Kit car
- Rolling chassis
