= 900 (disambiguation) =

900 may refer to:

== Numbers ==
- 900 (number), a number in the 900s range
- 900 telephone number, an area code in North America reserved for additional charge calling

== Time ==
- AD 900, a year in the first millennium of the Common Era
- 900 BC, a year in the first millennium Before Common Era
- 900s (decade) AD, a decade in the first millennium of the Common Era
- 900s BC (decade), a decade in the first millennium Before Common Era
- 900s (century) AD, a century in the first millennium of the Common Era
- 900s BC (century), a century in the first millennium Before Common Era
- 9/00, September 2000
- 9/00, September 1900

== Places ==
- 900 Rosalinde (1918 EC), a main-belt asteroid, the 900th asteroid registered
- Căile Ferate Române Line 900, the 900 line operated by Căile Ferate Române, a rail line in Romania

== Legislation ==
- Decree 900, Guatemalan land reform law of 1952
- H.R. 900, the Puerto Rico Democracy Act, a federal bill in the United States, 2007

== Military ==
Ships with pennant number 900

- HNLMS Mercuur (A900), a Royal Netherlands Navy submarine support ship
- USS LST-900, a WWII U.S. Navy tank landingship

== Products ==
- Astra Model 900, a semiautomatic pistol
- Commodore 900, a microcomputer

=== Vehicles ===
- Bréguet 900 Louisette, a sailplane
- GMT900, a General Motors full-size pickup truck
- GS&WR Class 900, a locomotive class
- MD 900, a model of helicopter from McDonnell Douglas Helicopters
- Saab 900, a mid-sized automobile
- Fiat 900T, also known as the Fiat 900e and Zastava 900, a van
- South Australian Railways 900 class, a locomotive class

== Other uses ==
- 900MHz (33cm), a UHF band
  - UMTS 900, a frequency band for cellular telephony
- 900 AM (900kHz; 333m), a radio station frequency
- 900 (skateboarding), a 900° spin, also found in skiing and snowboarding
- 900 mm gauge railways
- 900 Airport Express, an airport bus route in the Greater Toronto Area

== See also ==
- List of highways numbered 900
- 1-900 (disambiguation)
- 900 series (disambiguation)
- 900s (disambiguation)
- C900 (disambiguation)
- E900 (disambiguation)
- P900 (disambiguation)
- S900 (disambiguation)
- V900 (disambiguation)
- W900 (disambiguation)
