= C900 =

C900 or similar, may refer to:

- 준, the Unicode character U+C900; see List of modern Hangul characters in ISO/IEC 2022–compliant national character set standards
- c.900 (circa 900), about the year
  - AD 900
  - 900 BC
  - 900s (disambiguation), decades and centuries
- Commodore 900 computer
- C900, alternative name for the LG Quantum smartphone

== See also ==
- C90 (disambiguation)
