= 9900 =

9900 may refer to:

- A.D. 9900, a year in the 10th millennium CE
- 9900 BCE, a year in the 10th millennium BC
- Texas Instruments TMS9900, an early, 1976, 16 bit microprocessor
- Volvo 9900, a motor coach bus
- BlackBerry Bold 9900, a touchscreen smartphone
- Vermont Route 9900, a state highway
- 9900 Llull, an asteroid in the Asteroid Belt, the 9900th asteroid registered; see List_of_minor_planets:_9001–10000

== See also ==
- 990 (disambiguation)
- 900 (disambiguation)
- 90 (disambiguation)
