= 1900 (disambiguation) =

1900 was a year.

1900 may also refer to:

- 1900 BC, a year
- 1900 (number), a natural number
- 1900 (film), a 1976 Italian epic film
- 1900, main character of The Legend of 1900, a 1998 film
- 1900 (magazine), a Dutch sports publication
- ICT 1900 series, a family of mainframe computers
- Port 1900, Simple Service Discovery Protocol (SSDP), discovery of UPnP devices
- Beechcraft 1900, a turboprop regional airliner
- SP1900 EMU, a train in Hong Kong
- 1900, a 2008 album by Caramel Jack
- Fiat 1900, also known as the NSU-Fiat 1900, a passenger car
- Opel 1900, a family car marketed in the United States
  - Opel 1900 Sports Coupé, a sports coupé marketed in the United States

== See also ==
- Series 1900 (disambiguation)
- 1-900 (disambiguation)
- 190
