= Acqua Santa Maria =

Italian mineral water brand

- Type: Mineral water
- Distributor: Sicil Acque Minerali, Si.A.M. srl
- Origin: Italy
- Introduced: 1992; 34 years ago
- Website: www.acquasantamaria.it

Acqua Santa Maria is the main brand of the company Sicil Acque Minerali, Si.A.M. srl that is a company with registered office in Ragusa and operational headquarters Modica in Sicily, which since 1992 manages the extraction and bottling of mineral waters.

== Company ==
SI.A.M. SRL, was established in 1992, has its registered office in Ragusa and its operational headquarters in Modica. The company owns a mining concession called Santa Maria Zappulla, in the municipality of Modica and has 3 active wells, indeed the product is sold under 3 different brands.

The structure is 8,000 square meters. A large area, in which water is extracted, surrounds the entire factory.

== Springs and history ==
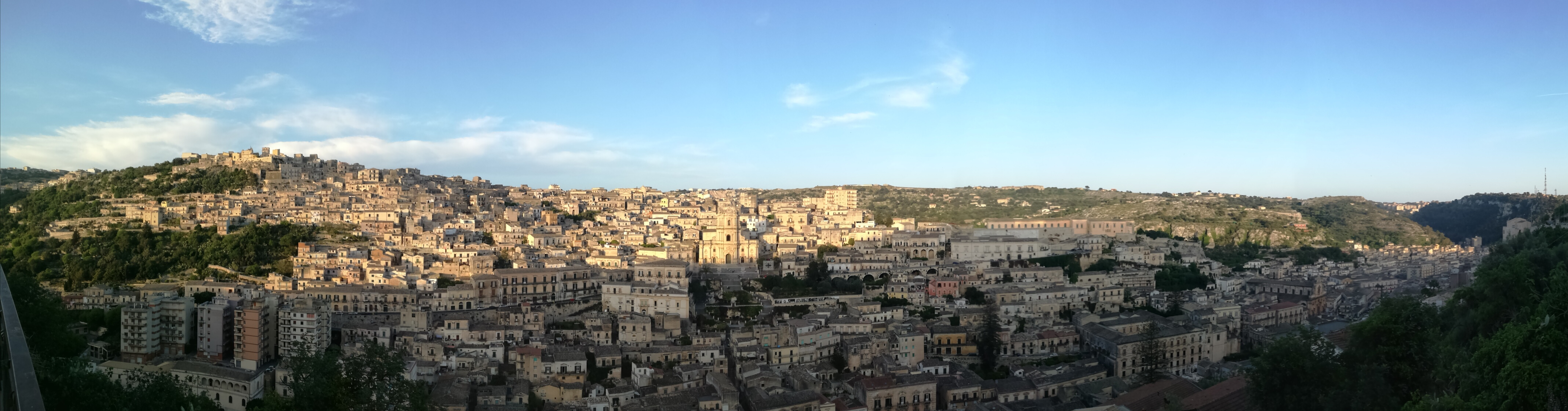
Panorama of Modica

The waters flow from sources in the extreme southeast of Sicily in a large, fertile limestone high plain of tectonic origin in the Hyblaean Mountains zone (in the Modica area) and together with another stream (San Francesco) they form the Mothicanus torrent.

The Modicane springs have been exploited since ancient times. Along these waterways, man has built kitchen garden and basins for collecting water that date back to the Arab domination that in Modica began in 844-845.

The Mothicanus torrent joins the San Liberale stream giving life to the Fiumara di Modica that flows into the Mediterranean Sea. Along the Motycanus torrent, between the cities of Scicli and Modica, caves and tombs have been found that attest to the human presence at these waterways already between the Bronze Age and the early Iron Age (around 900s BC).

The contrada that houses the springs and the headquarters of the company is called "Santa Maria Zappulla".

== Holding labels ==
- Santa Maria
- Ruscella
- Roverella

== Distribution ==
Mineral waters from Si.A.M. are sold primarily in Sicily, in the neighbors Calabria and Malta but also in the rest of Italy.
