= 1-900 (disambiguation) =

1-900 is a type premium rate telephone number, found in North America, using the pseudo area code "900".

1-900 may also refer to:

- 1-900 (film), a 1994 Dutch film
- 1-900 (record producer), a U.S. record producer, songwriter, musician

== See also ==
- 1900 (disambiguation)
- L-900, a Ford L series heavy duty truck
- Samsung Omnia SGH i-900 smartphone
- 900 (disambiguation)
