= Series 1900 =

Series 1900 or 1900 series may refer to:

- ICT 1900 series of mainframe computers
- Cisco 1900-series switch for computer networking
- FEVE 1900 series, a Spanish meter-gauge dual-mode locomotive
- Series 1900 dollar bills of the United States; see History of the United States dollar
- Series 1900 leu coins of Romania; see Coins of the Romanian leu

== See also ==
- 1900 world series of American baseball
- 1900 (disambiguation)
