= E900 =

E900 may refer to:

- Asus E900, a subnotebook computer
- Fujifilm FinePix E900, a digital camera
- Polydimethylsiloxane or dimethyl polysiloxane (E number: E900), a food additive
- Samsung SGH-E900, a mobile phone

== See also ==
- E90 (disambiguation)
