= Renfe Class 619 =

Spanish meter-gauge dual-mode locomotive

Renfe 619 series
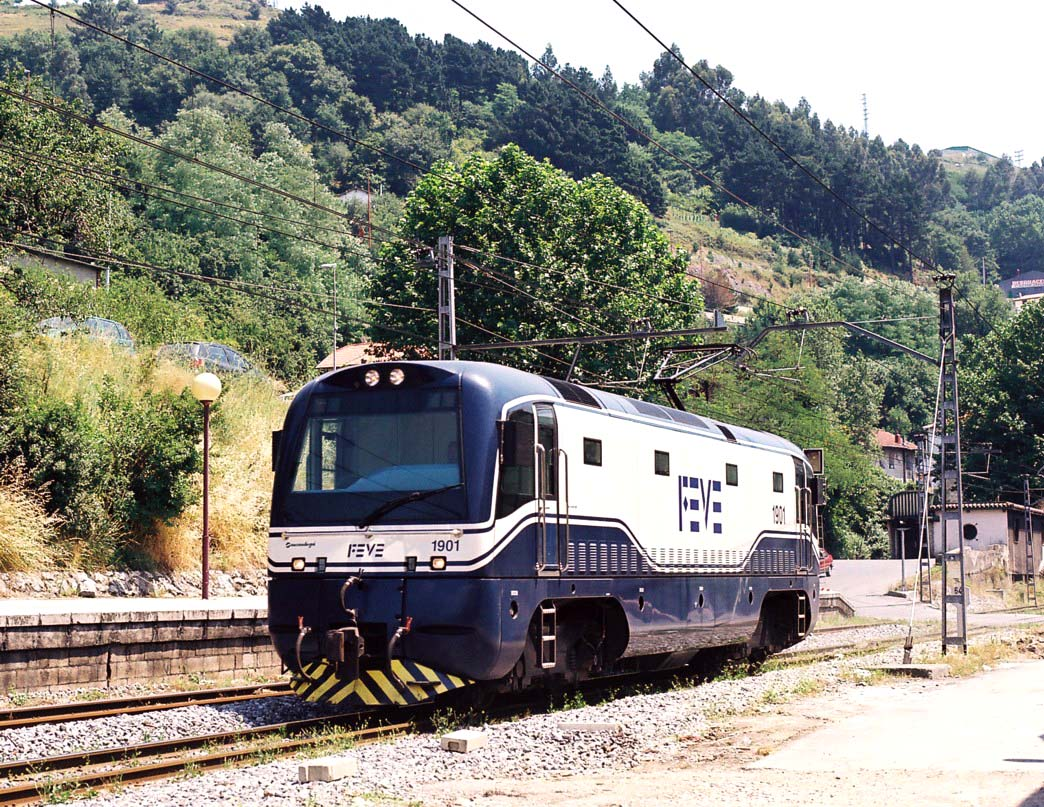
- Feve 1901 in 2005
Type and origin
- Power type: Dual-mode
- Model: Feve 1900 series Renfe 619 series
- Build date: 2002–2004
- Total produced: 17
Specifications
- Configuration
  - AAR: B-B
  - UIC: Bo′Bo′
- Gauge: 1,000 mm (3 ft 3 3/8 in)
- Wheel diameter: 880 mm (2.89 ft)
- Wheelbase: 8,790 mm (28.84 ft)
- Length: 14,030 mm (46.03 ft)
- Width: 2,600 mm (8.5 ft)
- Height: 3,700 mm (12.1 ft)
- Loco weight: 60 t (59 long tons; 66 short tons)
- Fuel capacity: 2,000 L (530 US gal)
- Electric system/s: 1,500 V DC
- Current pickup: Pantograph
- RPM
  - RPM low idle: 750 rpm
  - Maximum RPM: 1,500 rpm
- Engine type: Caterpillar 3512B V12 engine
- Alternator: Indar LSB-500-E/8
- Traction motors: Siemens 1 TB 2021
- Cylinders: V12
- Cylinder size: 170 / 190 mm (6.7 / 7.5 in)
- Loco brake: Rheostatic brake Compressed air brake
- Couplers: Alliance
Performance figures
- Maximum speed: 70 km/h (43 mph)
- Power output: 1,130 kW (1,520 hp)
Career
- Operators: Feve; Renfe; Ferrovial Construcción
- Class: 1900 series (Feve); 619 series (Renfe)
- Number in class: 17
- Numbers: 1901–1917
- Locale: Spain
- Delivered: 2002–2004
- First run: 2002
- Current owner: Renfe Cercanías AM; Ferrovial Construcción

The Renfe 619 series (formerly the Feve 1900 series until 2012) is a meter-gauge locomotive, manufactured by Ferrocarriles de Vía Estrecha (Feve) and currently owned by Renfe of Spain. It was the first dual-mode locomotive used on Spanish railroads. Seventeen locomotives were built in total, originally rebuilt from withdrawn Feve 1000 series locomotives. The locomotives were built for both freight and passenger services, including the tourist train Transcantábrico.

== Background ==
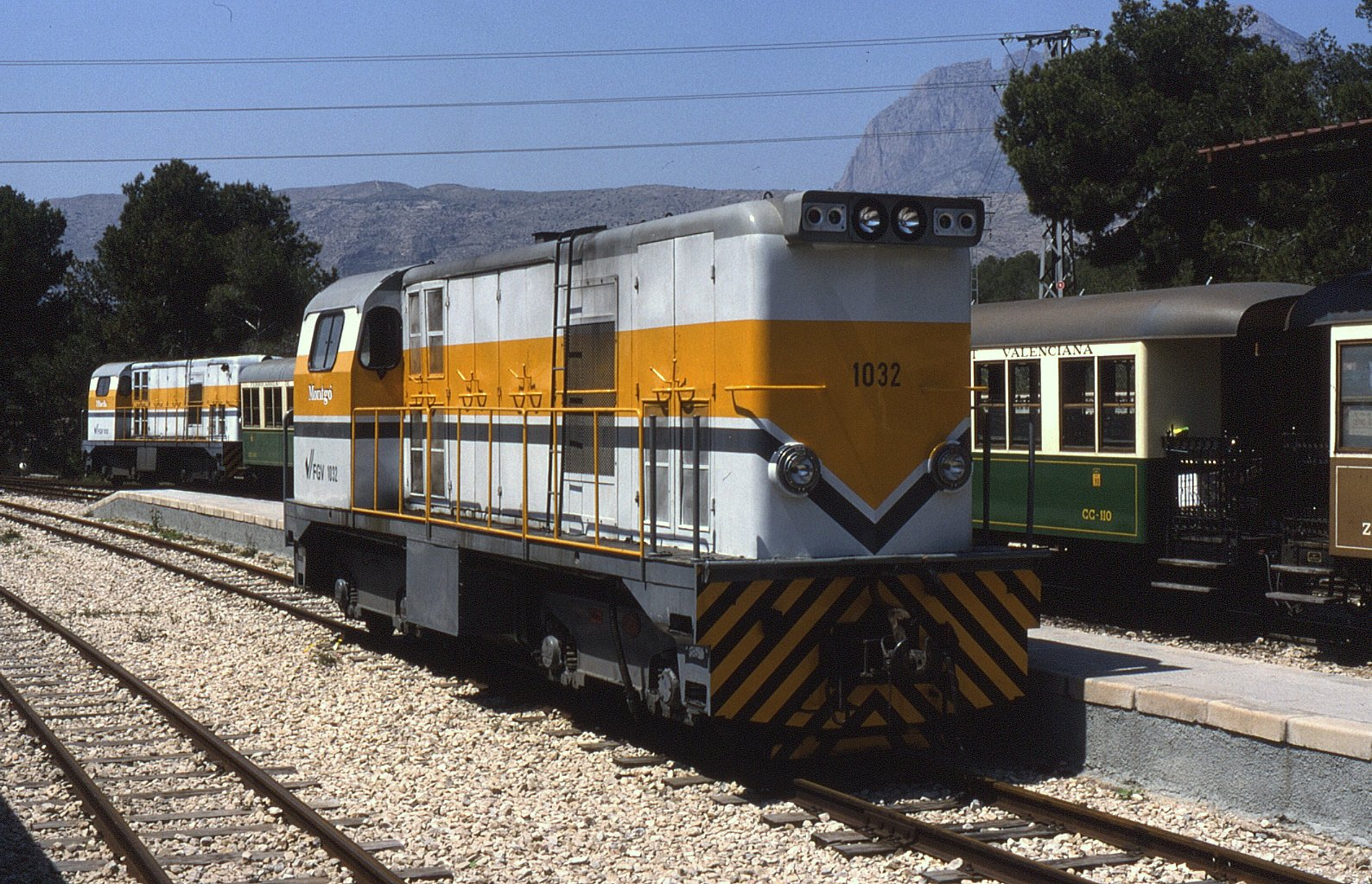
Feve 1000 series diesel locomotives in service with the Lemon Express, 1997

As a result of Spain's Ministry of Development 2000–2007 infrastructure plan, railroad infrastructure was being upgraded. Feve was modernizing their rolling stock; Feve had modernized the 2400 and 2600 series diesel multiple units, as well as the 3500 and 3600 series electric multiple units. In addition, six freight locomotives built by the French manufacturer Alstom received new engines. and had invested over €17,500,000 in 2002 (equivalent to US$35,100,000 in 2025) to build new locomotives. The FEVE 1000 series—a diesel locomotive built from 1955 to 1967 by Alstom—had been withdrawn from service, as they were becoming too old to operate, and were not powerful enough to haul Feve's steel trains. Feve repurposed the parts of the withdrawn 1000 series locomotives to build the 1900 series locomotives.

The 1900 series locomotives were developed by the Feve Rolling Stock Department (Note: Spanish: Dirección de Material de Feve) as a dual-mode locomotive; (Note: Spanish: Tracción Dual, lit. 'dual traction') they could run on electricity from overhead lines through pantographs, or from an onboard diesel engine. Several companies assisted Feve in the production of the series 1900 locomotives, including Siemens, Caterpillar, Suncove, Construcciones y Auxiliar de Ferrocarriles, Sunsundegui, and SAB WABCO. The 1000 series locomotives were fitted with a new body, new pneumatic and electrical equipment, and Siemens traction motors. The locomotives were intended for both freight services and for the tourist train Transcantábrico; several locomotives were painted in the latter's two-tone blue-white livery.

== History ==
Seventeen locomotives were built in total. The locomotives were built for two orders; the first order was for ten locomotives. The first locomotive, numbered 1901, was built and registered in September 2002. The locomotive underwent test runs in Valmaseda and Asturias, and entered service in December of the same year. The remaining nine locomotives of the first order, numbered 1902–1910, were built at the Sunsundegui workshops in Alsasua, and entered service in 2003. A second and final order of seven locomotives, which were numbered 1911–1917, were built and registered from June to July 2004.

In 2002, the 1900 series locomotives—the first dual-mode locomotives used on Spanish railroads—had reintroduced electric locomotives for freight services on Spanish meter-gauge railroads. In 2003, the Spanish rail network EuskoTren had virtually all of its 180 km of railroad lines electrified. EuskoTren had originally ceased their freight services in 1985, and ran exclusively passenger services. The locomotives hauled coils from the Aceraila rolling mill in Avilés, Asturias, to Lasarte station in Guipúzcoa, as part of an agreement between Feve and Euskotren.

The locomotives have contributed to reducing environmental pollution and noise pollution, specifically for freight services through urban areas. The locomotives would use their diesel mode during day services, and their electric mode during night services, when lower electricity rates were available. In 2011, the locomotives were upgraded to switch between diesel or electric modes while moving. (Note: Initially, the locomotives had to be stopped in order to switch between modes.)

The locomotives have been used for several tourist train services, including the Transcantábrico Gran Lujo, a 14-car train with seven sleeping carriages; Transcantábrico Clásico, a 13-car train with seven sleeping carriages; and the Tren Costa Verde Express, a 13-car train. In addition, the locomotives have also been used for the special services Tren de la Biosfera and Tren del Bajo Nalón.

On December 31, 2012, FEVE was absorbed into Renfe Operadora and Adif, with Renfe managing rolling stock and maintenance, and Adif managing infrastructure and operations. The following years, Renfe—the new meter-gauge railway operator—renumbered Feve's rolling stock to match UIC identification and simply train monitoring done by Adif. The original number for the series, 1900, was changed to the series's corresponding UIC number, 619. (Note: Locomotives classified with the number 600 were dual-mode locomotives.) The original number for the series is still commonly used.

=== Withdrawals ===
Since the locomotives were introduced, they had gradually been taken out of service. From 2007 to 2012, all 17 locomotives remained in service. In 2013, 14 locomotives were in service. In October 2024, seven locomotives were in service. Two locomotives had been cannibalized, with the remainder being taken out of service in March 2022, awaiting sale. On March 28, 2025, locomotive 619.013—one of the locomotives for sale at the time—was bought by Ferrovial Construcción, a railroad construction company. As of September 2025, seven locomotives operate for Renfe's tourist passenger services.

† Operating for Renfe Viajeros
‡ Operating for Ferrovial Construcción
* Awaiting sale

List of locomotives as of September 29, 2025
Feve No.	UIC No.	Rebuilt from	Depot	Registered	Status
1901	92 71 3 619-001-8	1025	Santander	2002/06/09	Cannibalized
1902	92 71 3 619-002-6	1026	Balmaseda	2003	In service†
1903	92 71 3 619-003-4	1029	El Berrón	2003	Not in service*
1904	92 71 3 619-004-2	1023	Balmaseda	2003	Not in service*
1905	92 71 3 619-005-9	1054	El Berrón	2003	In service†
1906	92 71 3 619-006-7	1031	El Berrón	2003	Not in service*
1907	92 71 3 619-007-5	1021	Balmaseda	2003	Not in service*
1908	92 71 3 619-008-3	1028	Santander	2003	Cannibalized
1909	92 71 3 619-009-1	1061	Santander	2003	Not in service*
1910	92 71 3 619-010-9	1063	Santander	2003	In service†
1911	92 71 3 619-011-7		El Berrón	2004/06/11	Not in service*
1912	92 71 3 619-012-5		El Berrón	2004/06/18	Not in service*
1913	92 71 3 619-013-3		El Berrón	2004/06/25	In service‡
1914	92 71 3 619-014-1		Santander	2004/07/02	In service†
1915	92 71 3 619-015-8		Balmaseda	2004/07/09	In service†
1916	92 71 3 619-016-6		Santander	2004/07/16	In service†
1917	92 71 3 619-017-4	1062	Balmaseda	2004/07/23	In service†
