= Sterling Trucks =

Former American truck manufacturer

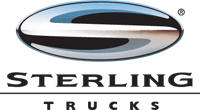
- Type: Subsidiary
- Industry: Automotive industry
- Founded: 1906; 120 years ago (original); 1997
- Defunct: 1953; 73 years ago (original); 2009
- Fate: Sterling Motor Truck Company: Acquired by White Motor Corporation (1951); Sterling Trucks: Closed (2009)
- Successor: Freightliner Trucks
- Headquarters: Redford Township, Michigan, U.S.
- Key people: William Sternberg (Founder)
- Products: Trucks
- Owner: Daimler-Benz (1997–1998); DaimlerChrysler (1999–2007); Daimler AG (2007–2009)
- Parent: Freightliner Corporation (1997–2008); Daimler Trucks North America (2008–2009)
- Website: sterlingtrucks.com

Sterling Trucks Corporation (commonly designated Sterling) was an American truck manufacturer from 1998 to 2009. Specializing in heavy-duty (Class 6-8) commercial trucks, the company was established following the 1997 acquisition of the heavy-truck product lines of Ford Motor Company by Daimler AG, parent company of Freightliner. Within the Freightliner product range (later Daimler Trucks North America), Sterling was slotted between Freightliner and flagship manufacturer Western Star. Sterling-brand trucks were sold in the United States, Canada, Mexico, Australia, and New Zealand.

Sterling Trucks was the namesake of Sterling Truck Motor Company, which closed its doors in 1953. In place of the Ford Blue Oval emblem, Sterling Trucks maintained an oval emblem with a sterling-silver "S"; for much of its production, the company continued production of the second-generation Ford Louisville/Aeromax product line. In the 2000s, the company expanded its product range with medium-duty (Class 5–7) trucks.

Headquartered in Redford Township, Michigan (Detroit), Sterling assembled its conventional-cab vehicles in St. Thomas, Ontario and Portland, Oregon. After years of struggling to meet sales expectations, Daimler discontinued the Sterling Trucks line in 2009.

== History ==
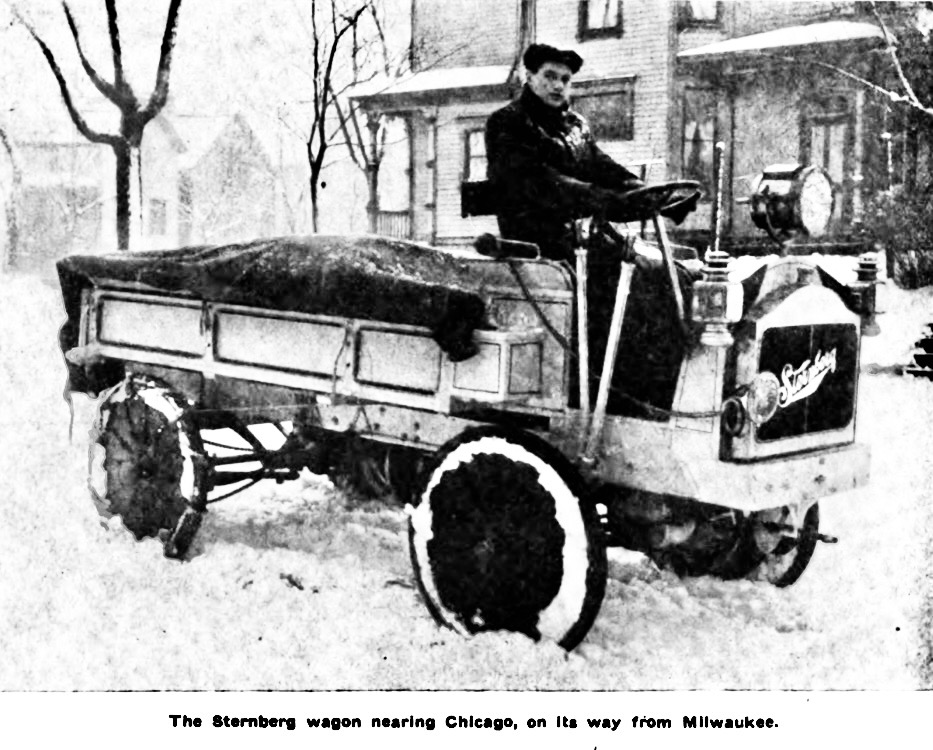
Sternberg truck (1908)

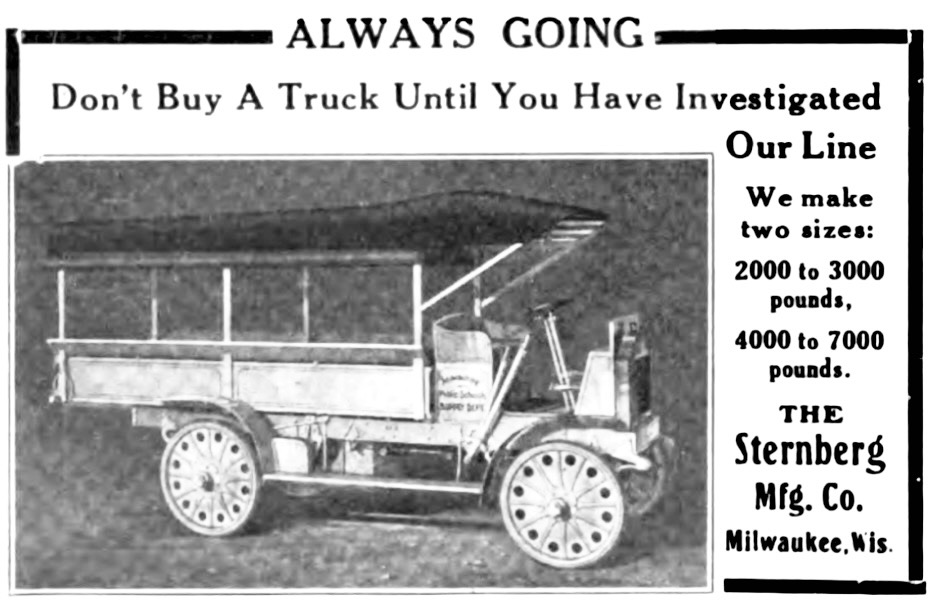
Sternberg advertisement (1909)

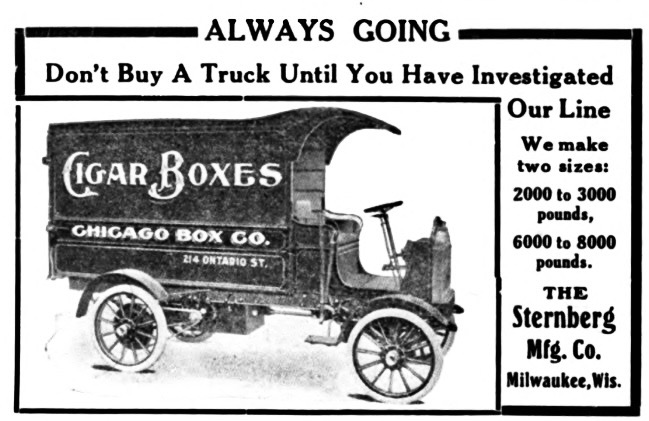
Sternberg truck advertisement (1909)

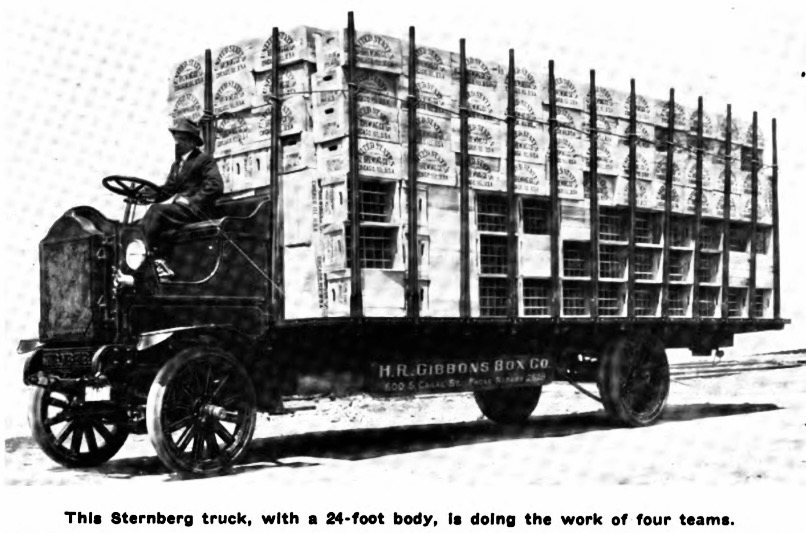
Sternberg truck (1913)

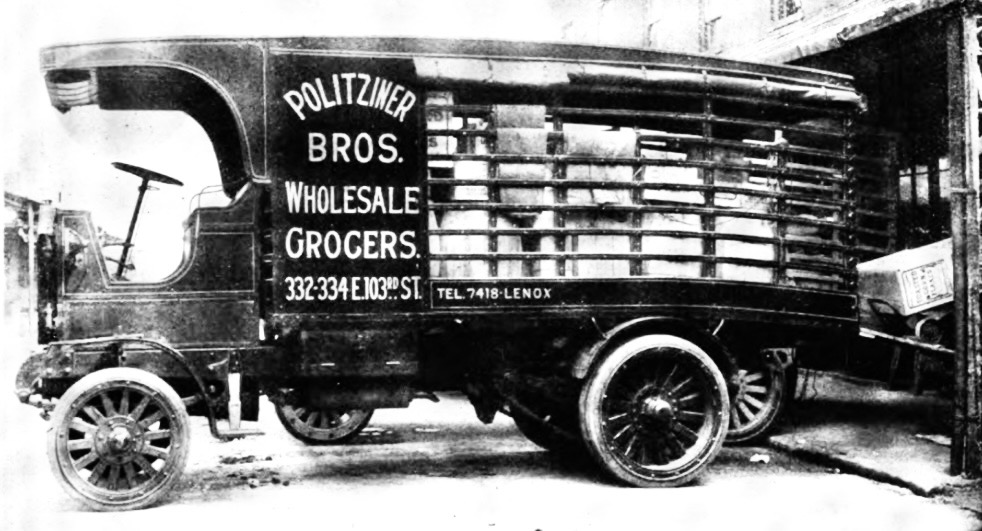
Sternberg 5t (1914)

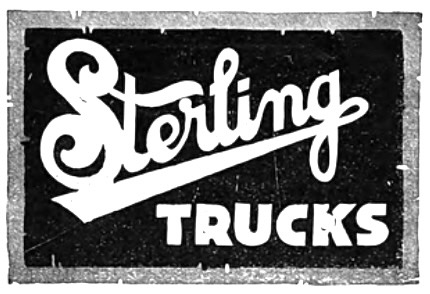
Sterling Trucks logo (1927)

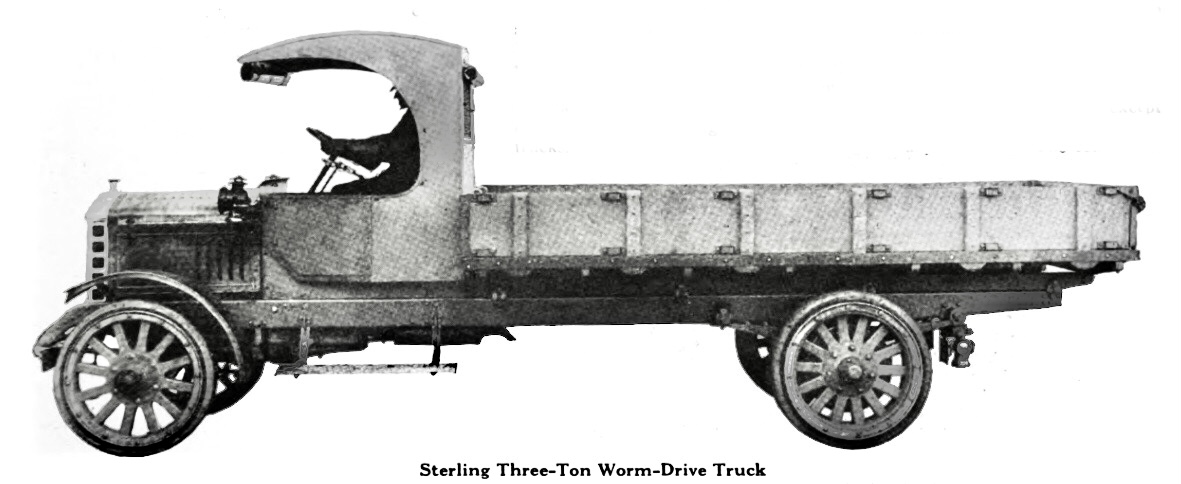
Sterling 3,5 t (1915-1918)

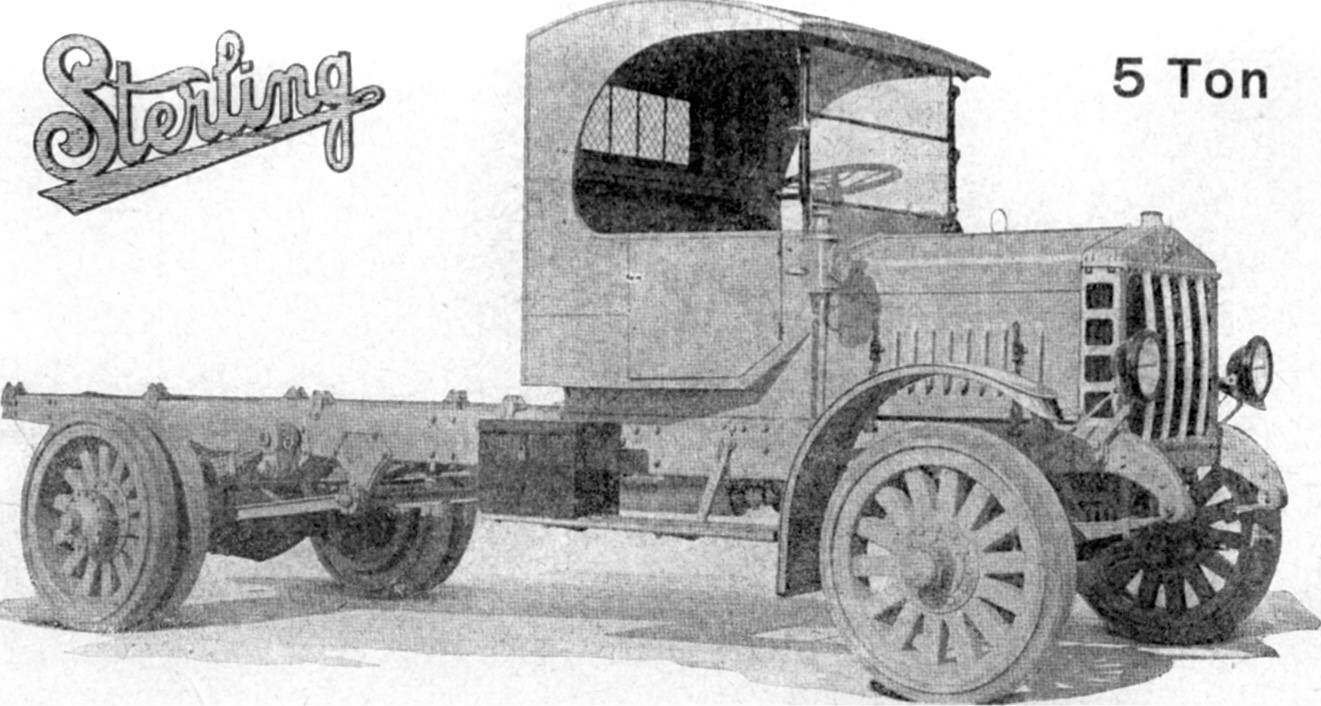
Sterling 5 t (1916-1919)

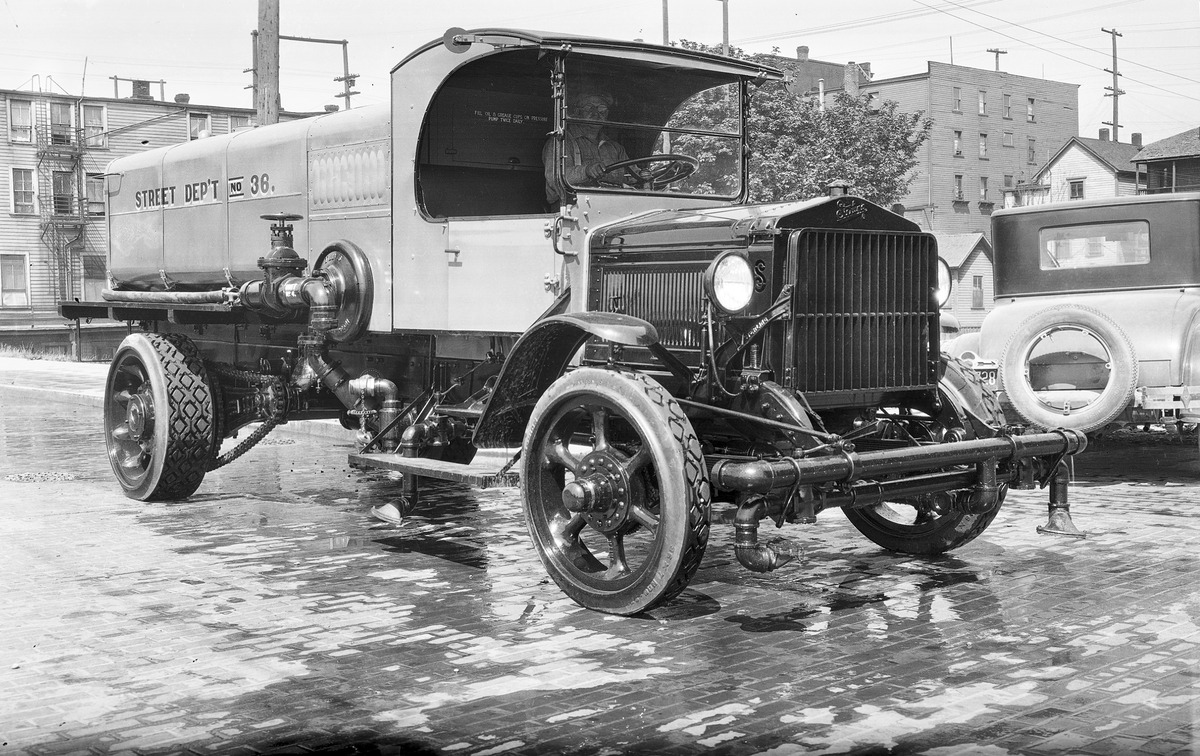
A street-cleaning truck in Seattle by the original Sterling company

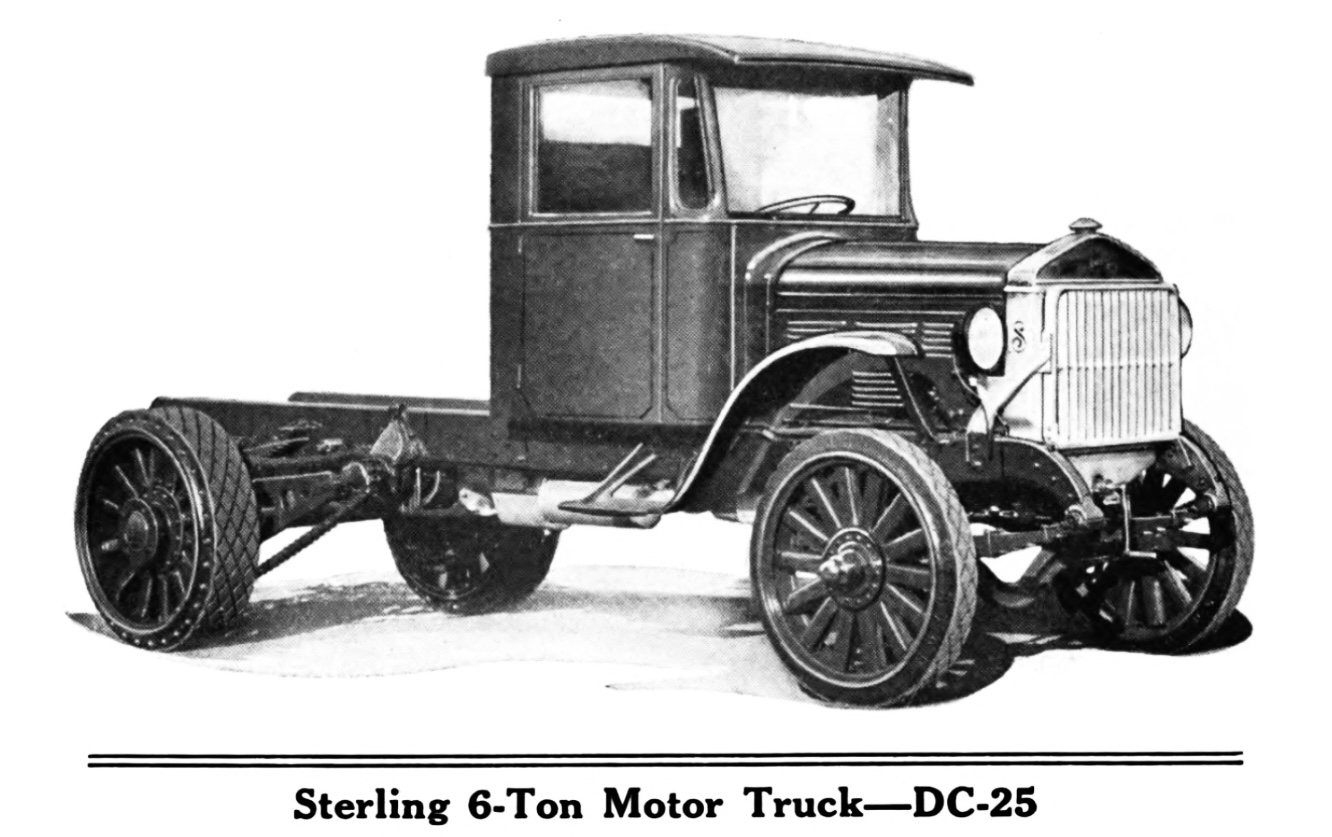
Sterling DC 25 (1928-1929)

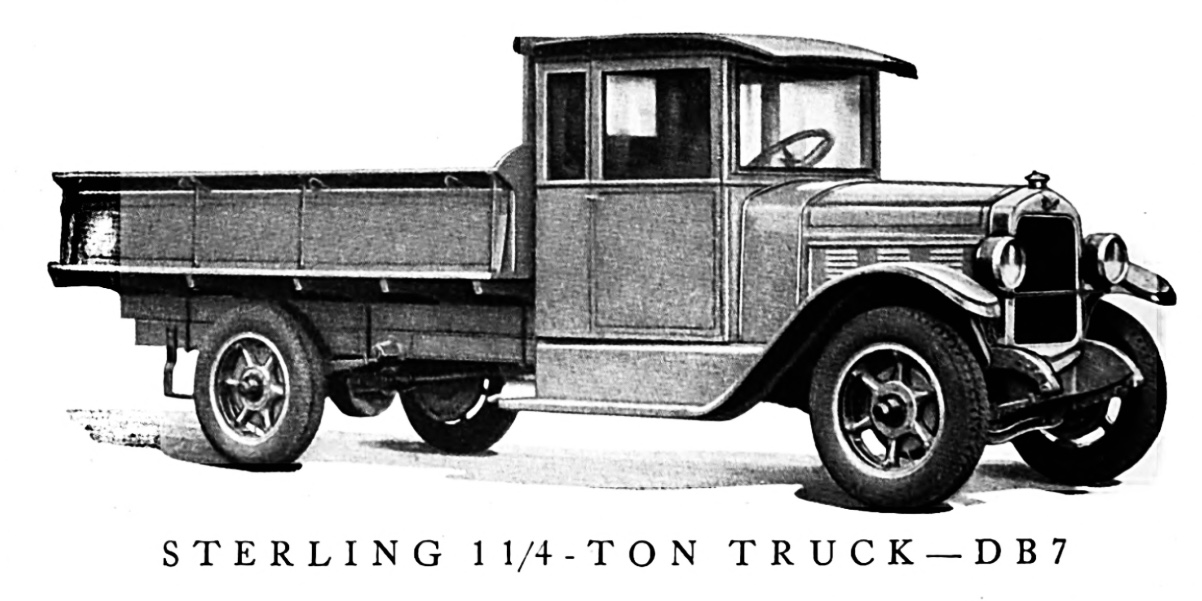
Sterling DB 7 (1929-1930)

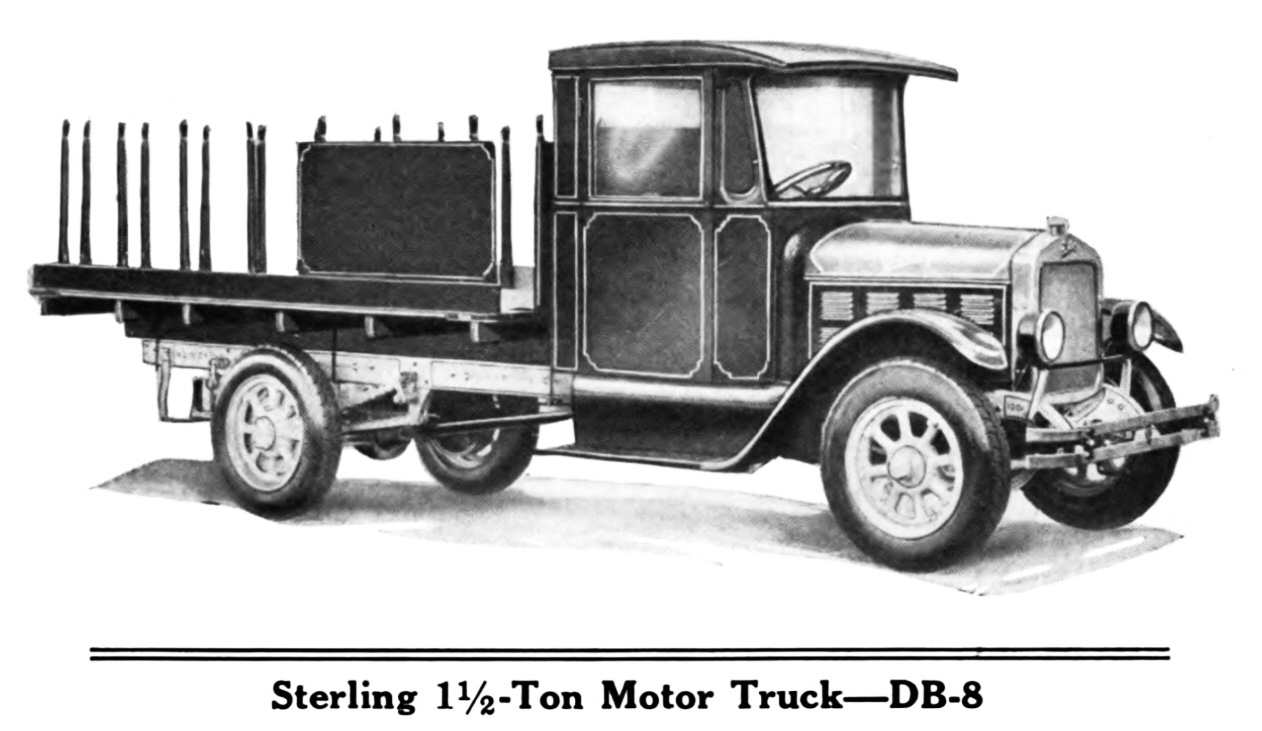
Sterling DB 8 (1928-1930)

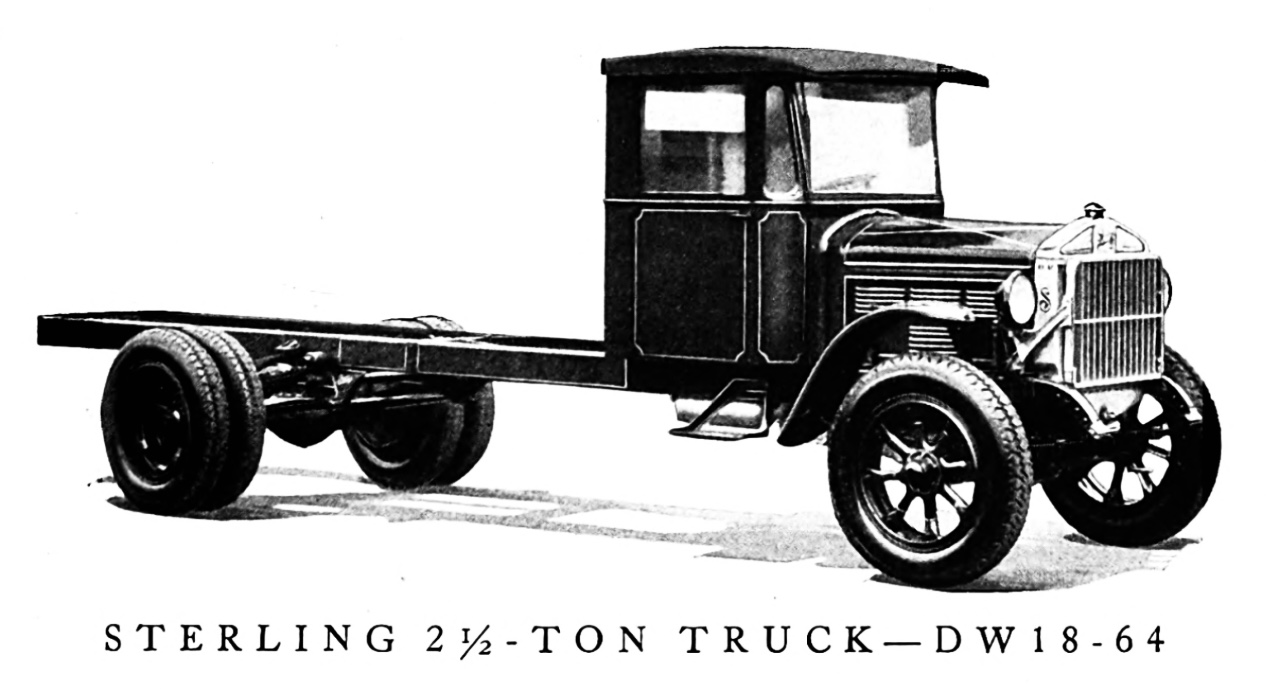
Sterling DW18-64 (1929-1930)

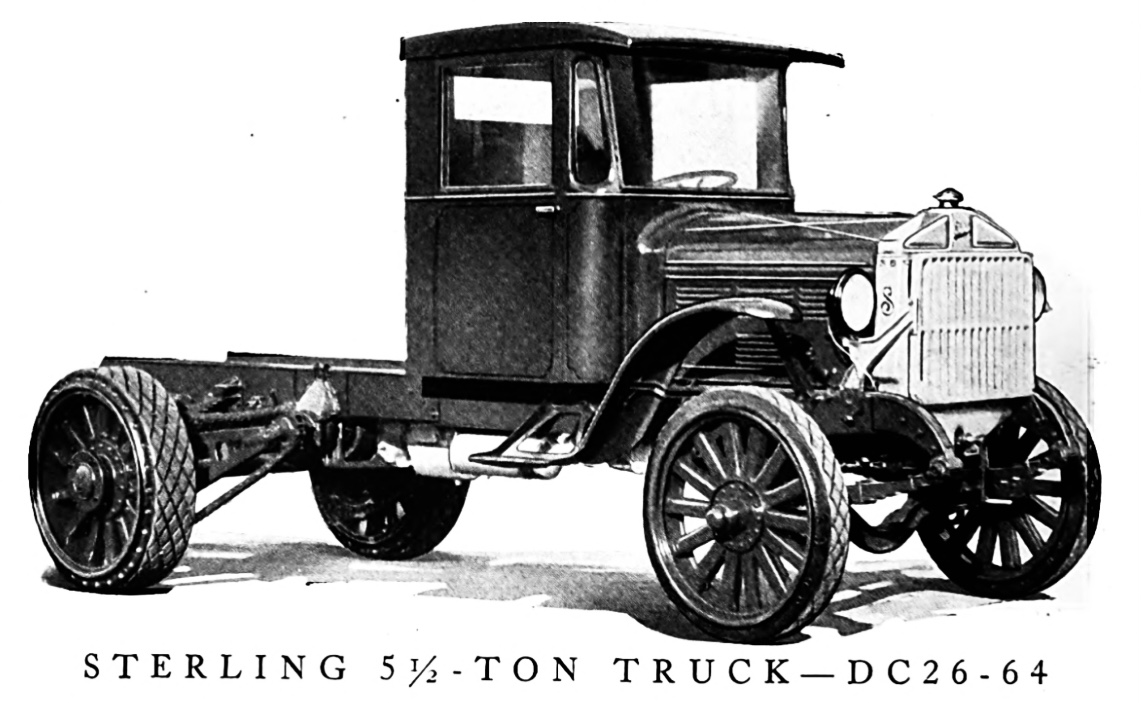
Sterling DC 26-64 (1929-1930)

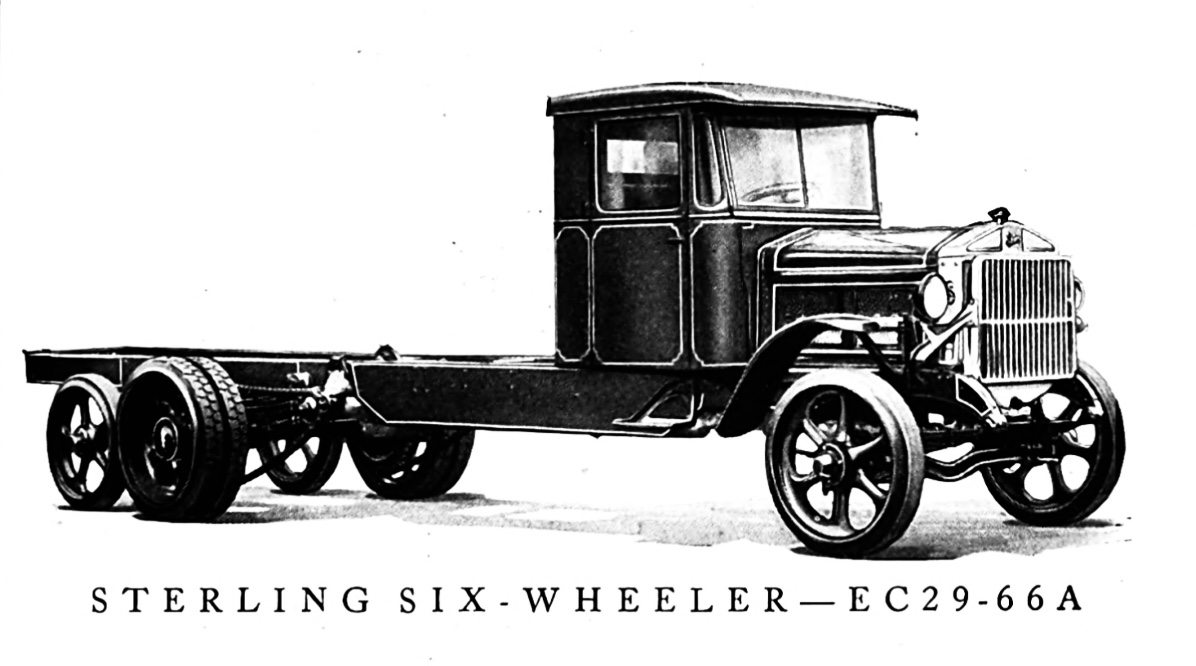
Sterling EC 29-66 A (1929-1930)

=== Sternberg/Sterling Motor Truck Company (1907–1953) ===
The original company was founded in 1906 by William Sternberg as the Sternberg Motor Truck Company of Milwaukee, Wisconsin. Early models offered were of cab-over design, in 1-, 1.5- 3.5- and 5-ton capacities. Sternberg changed the company name to Sterling at the onset of World War I. Sterling built many different heavy-duty trucks for commercial, construction and military customers in the ensuing years. In 1938, Sterling sold 267 units and in 1939 it increased to 326 trucks.

The company was bought by White Motor Corporation on June 1, 1951. About two years later, the Sterling nameplate was retired.

As the Sterling trademark had become dormant for so long, when Freightliner (whose own trucks were distributed by White Motor Corporation from the 1950s to 1975) sought to use the name in 1997, there were no grounds for objection from Volvo.

Year	Production	Model	Serial numbers
1914		2,5 t	
		3 t	
		5 t	
		6 t	
change from Sternberg to Sterling		The sale to Great Britain with the change from the German last name to Sterling should be improved.	
1915	66	2,5 t	200001-200066
	174	3,5 t	300001-300174
	44	7 t	700001-700044
1916	94	2,5 t	200067-200160
	294	3,5 t	300175-300468
	101	5 t	500000-500100
	86	7 t	700045-700130
1917	304	2,5 t	200161-200464
	160	3,5 t	300469-300557, 3560-3630
	173	5 t	500101-500211, 5202-5263
	50	7 t	700131-700180
1918	208	2,5 t	2465-2672
	278	3,5 t	31000-31052, 3631-3855
	167	5 t	5264-5430
	20	7 t	700181-700200
1919	216	2,5 t	2673-2888
	129	3,5 t	31053-31103, 3856-3904, 3971-3999
	104	5 t	5451-5530, 5592-5615
	318	7 t	9000-9317
1920	1,732	1,5 t	10011-11561
	↑	2 t	10022-11742
	78	2,5 t	2926-2999, 21000-21003
	163	3,5 t	3921-3946, 31111-31247
		5 t	
		7,5 t	
1921			
1922			
1923			
1924		⟨GB 1⟩, ⟨GB 2⟩,	
1925		DW 8	
		DW 10	
		DW 8X	
		DW 12	
		DW 14	
		DW 13D	
		DW 16	
		DW 15D	
		EW 20	
		EW 19D	
		EW 23	
		EW 22D	
		EC 23	
		EC 22	
		EWS 25	
		EWS 24D	
		EW27	
		ECS 24	
		ECS 23D	
		EC 26	
		EC 25D	
		EC 29	
		EC 28	
		EC 35	
		EC 34D	
1926		DW 9	
		DW 10	
		DW 12	
		DW 10S	
		DW 12S	
		DW 14	
		DW 18	
		DW 14 S	
		EW 20	
		EW 23	
		EC 23	
		EW 27	
		EWS 25	
		ECS 24	
		EC 26	
		EC 29	
		EC 35	
1927		DW 9	
		DW 10	
		DW 12	
		DW 10S	
		DW 12S	
		DW 14	
		DW 18	
		DW 14 S	
		EW 20	
		EW 23	
		EC 23	
		EW 27	
		EWS 25	
		ECS 24	
		EC 26	
		EC 29	
		EC 35	
		DW 18 ( 4 cyl.)	
		EC 24 ( 6 cyl.)	
		DW 18 (6 cyl.)	
1938	~ 267		
1939	~ 326		
1946			
1947	717		
1948	445		
1949	249		
1950	402		
1951	207	June 57, thereafter included in White	
1952			
1953		the Sterling nameplate was retired	
Sum	~ 12,000		

Model in angle bracket = ⟨bus⟩

=== Sterling Trucks Corporation (1997–2009) ===
The Sterling name was applied by Freightliner to Class 8 tractors, as well as a range of medium- and heavy-duty cab/chassis vehicles as a continuation of the Ford L-Series after Freightliner's purchase of Ford's heavy truck product lines and the Louisville production facility. With bodies added by third-party upfitters/body builders, these cab/chassis vehicles were used for freight distribution as well as heavy vocational uses, such as construction, snow plowing and refuse collection.

In the last few years of operation, the company also marketed light to medium-duty cab/chassis vehicles from corporate siblings, such as the 360 (a rebadged Mitsubishi Fuso Canter) and Bullet (a badge-engineered Dodge Ram Chassis Cab). These were typically outfitted with bodies suitable for use as lighter vocational trucks — those designed to perform jobs other than straight freight hauling — including fire trucks, garbage trucks, dump trucks, concrete mixers, tanker trucks, and snowplows.

==== Discontinuation ====
On October 14, 2008, Daimler Trucks North America announced a plan to discontinue the Sterling product line in an effort to consolidate its North American truck manufacturing operations under the Freightliner and Western Star brands. The company stopped taking orders for new trucks in January 2009, the St. Thomas manufacturing plant closed in March 2009, and the Portland, Oregon, plant was closed in June 2010.

== Models ==
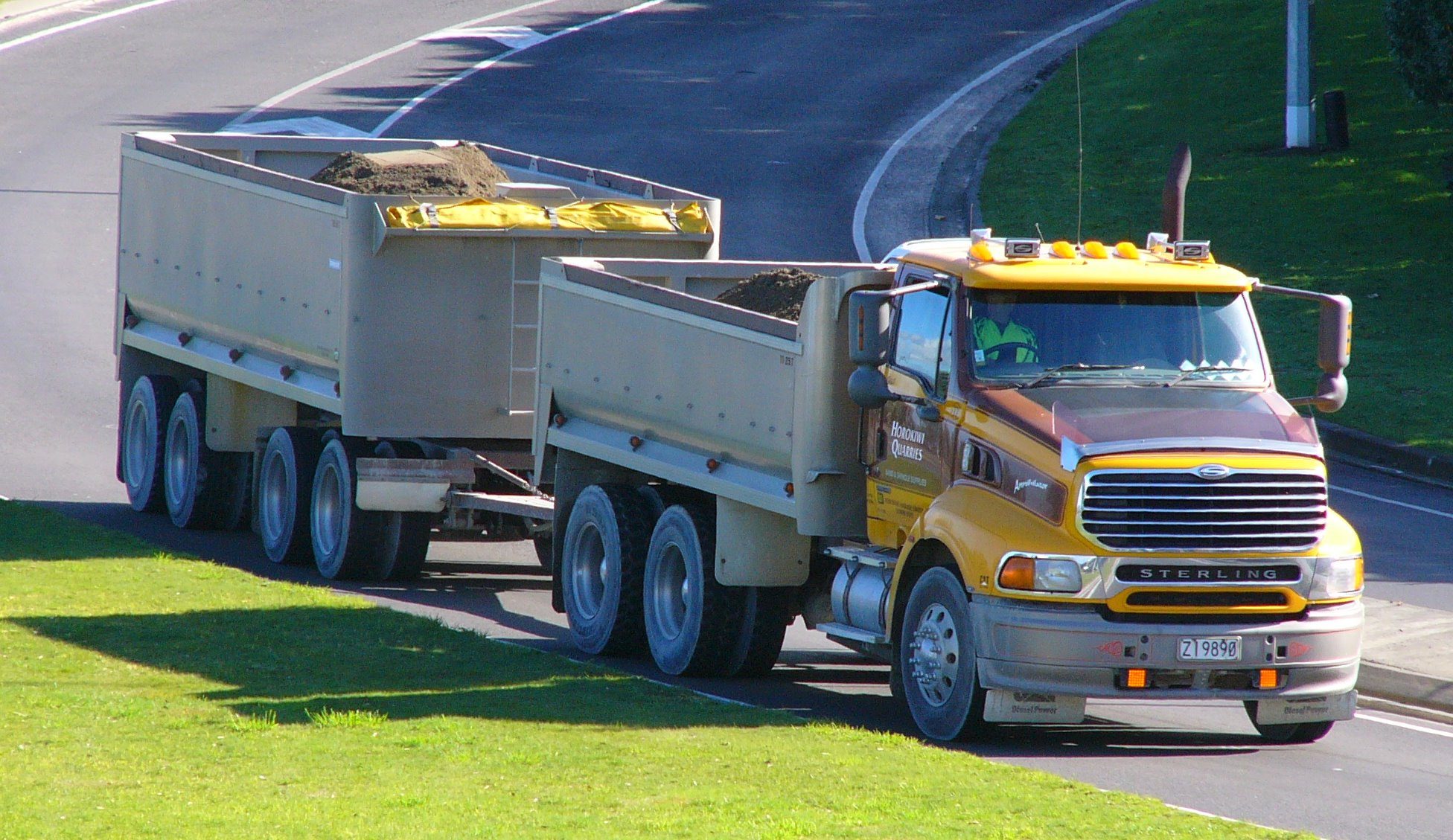
Sterling Acterra dump truck with trailer in New Zealand

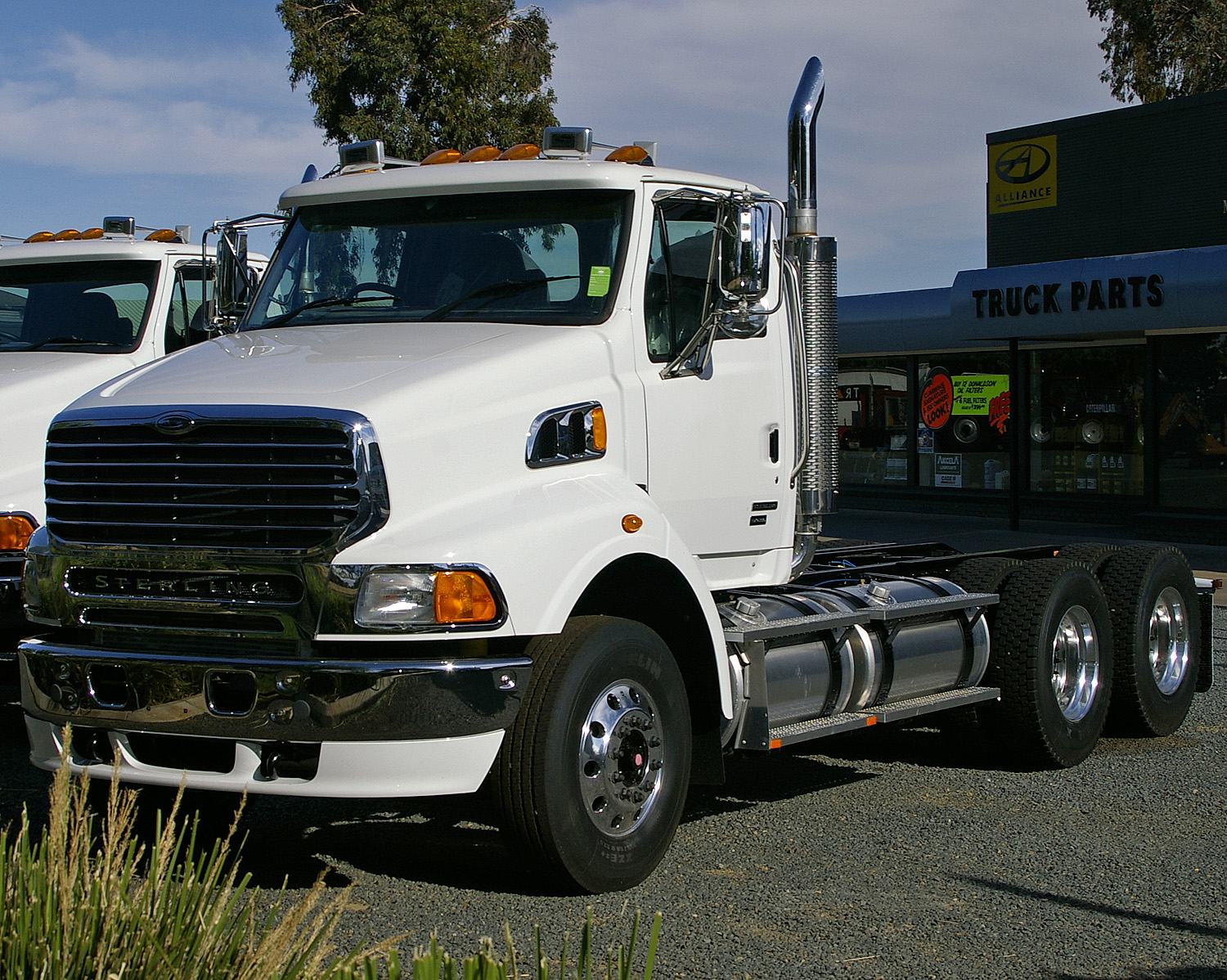
Sterling HX9500 MBE

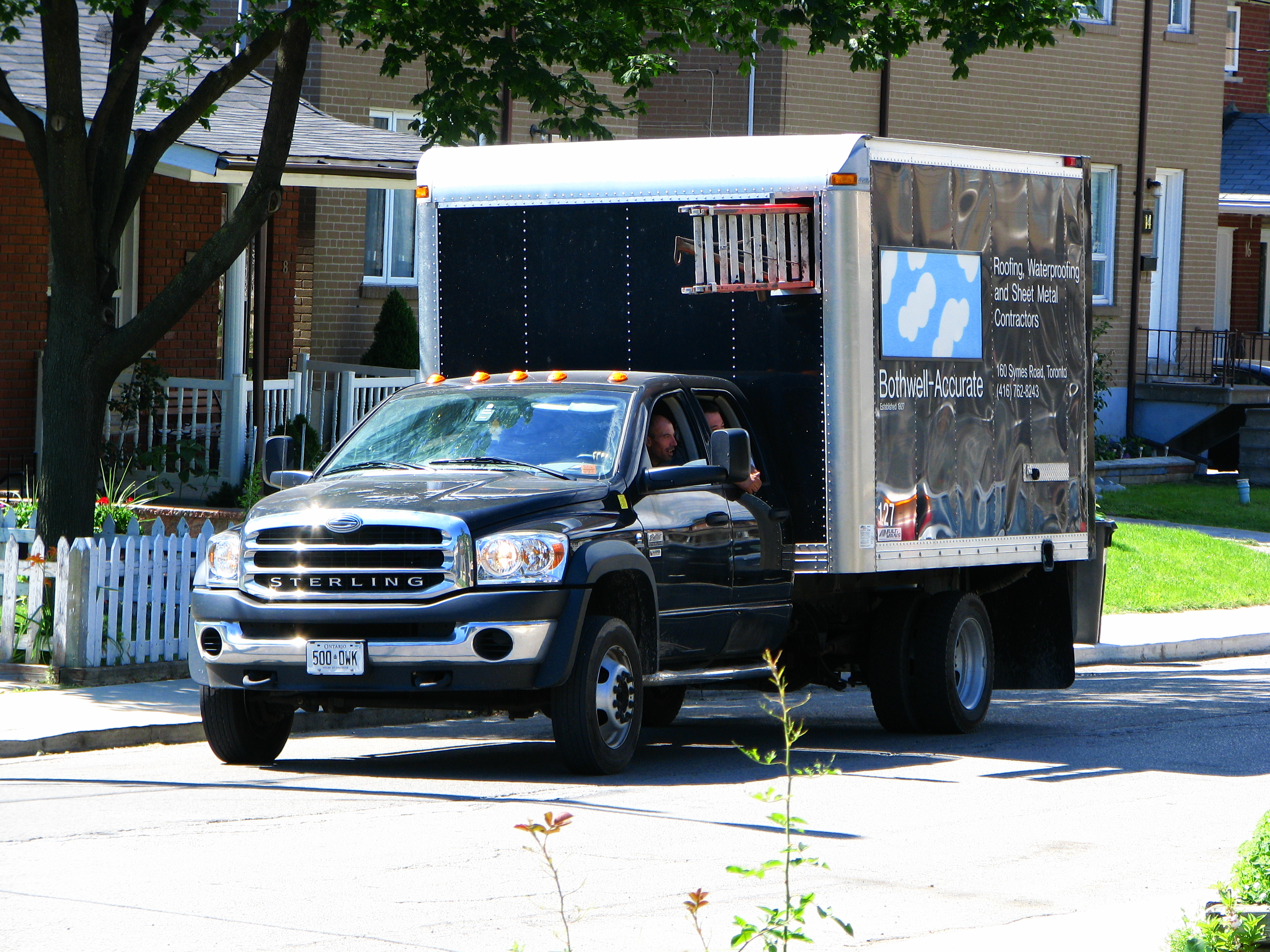
A Sterling Bullet in Ontario, Canada

From 1997 to 2009, Sterling produced several lines of trucks. Within Daimler-Benz, the Sterling product range was slotted between the Freightliner and Western Star product lines. Through much of its existence, the Sterling product range served as continuation of the second-generation Ford Louisville/AeroMax conventional product line (introduced in 1996).

- Sterling 360 – a rebadged Mitsubishi Fuso Canter medium-duty cabover sold as the Fuso FE model in the U.S. and Canada and the Fuso Canter in Europe, Asia, Australia, and New Zealand.
- A line – set back
- Acterra – (1999–2009) Class 5-8 medium-duty, using L-line cab with Freightliner Business Class chassis.
- Bullet – a cab/chassis model based on the third generation Dodge Ram 4500/5500 platform
- Condor – rebadged Freightliner cab. Was used commonly on garbage trucks.
- L line – set back, set forward

== See also ==
- Freightliner Trucks
- Western Star Trucks
