= Robert Mushtare =

American ten-pin bowler

Robert Mushtare (born 1988 or 1989 (age 36–37)) is an American ten-pin bowler from Carthage, New York who is recognized by the United States Bowling Congress (USBC) for having bowled two perfect 900 series, one on December 3, 2005 and the other on February 19, 2006, both at Pine Plains Bowling Center in Fort Drum, New York. He is also said to have rolled another in league play prior to the aforementioned two; that previous 900 series was not officially recognized by USBC because the league in which he was bowling was not properly certified by USBC on the date his 900 series was rolled. Due to the order of USBC certification procedures, it will never be known if it would have been approved even if his league had been certified at the time. The two 900's for which Mushtare was officially recognized came under great scrutiny because they were pre-bowled, meaning he bowled days before his regular league competition, and was sometimes bowling alone. ESPN's Jeremy Schaap did an investigative report on the controversy which was broadcast on the ESPN program Outside the Lines. Glenn Allison, who bowled an uncertified 900 series in 1982, was skeptical of Robert's achievements, as was former professional bowler and Team USA coach Tim Mack.

With this recognition, Mushtare is also officially recognized as the first youth bowler to shoot a certified 900 series, the first bowler (youth or adult) to bowl more than one, and the first bowler from New York state to achieve the feat. The ensuing controversy also led to a change in USBC rules; Rule 118e(8) now reads "Unopposed pre or post bowled scores will be eligible for USBC Awards except High Score Awards [such as a 300 game, 800 series, or 900 series award]"; had this rule been in effect for the 2005-2006 bowling season, Mushtare would not have been officially recognized for either of the 900's for which he is now recognized.

== Male Youth High Series ==
- 900 Robert Mushtare, Fort Drum, N.Y., December 5, 2005
- 900 Robert Mushtare, Fort Drum, N.Y., February 19, 2006
- 889 Shane Tetterton, Sinking Springs, Pa., September 24, 2006
- 888 Brentt Arcement, Kenner, La., January 20, 1990
- 879 Jacob Peters, Decatur, Ill., April 27, 2005
- 879 Gary Faulkner Jr., Memphis, June 22, 2008

These scores are from the USBC (United States Bowling Congress) Records and stats page.

== Junior Gold Tournament ==
In 2006, Mushtare did not advance to the semi-finals at the United States Bowling Congress Junior Gold championships. Throughout the tournament, Mushtare managed to have met several PBA players and even some higher level coaches in the sport of bowling. Junior team USA coach Rod Ross had stated, "I was very impressed with his physical game. He throws a phenomenal ball and has a nice loose arm swing. He has a lot of raw talent. He can definitely strike and strike a lot, and there's no doubt in my mind that he shot those 900s." And even though the 900 bowler did not make the first cut, Mushtare said the experience was memorable and that it was a great learning experience for him.

== Interviews ==
In June 2006, Mushtare had a personal interview with Jim King once King was able to contact the 17-year-old bowler. During his interview Mushtare states that he has bowled three 900 series during his league time and he has bowled two 900 series during practice. Now, after 4 months of deliberation, two of Mushtare's 900 series were approved. Mushtare states that the reasons for his pre-bowls were for school functions and a few bowling tournaments that Mushtare was scheduled to participate in. Mushtare also states that his third 900 series bowled was witnessed by personal friend Jamie Grimm. During this time, Mr. Grimm himself bowled his first 300-game and got a 741 series. Jim King also mentions that there were rumors going around that Mushtare's father is the owner of the bowling alley. Mushtare's response was "No. My father does not own it. It is owned by the government and located on a military base."

== League History ==
League	Type	Average	Games	Center/Association
2009-2010				
Friday Night mixed	Winter	247	83	Pine Plains Bowling Center (Watertown USBC)
County League	Winter	227	90	Pla Mor Lanes (Watertown USBC)
Seaway Scratch Challenge	Summer	216	44	Seaway Lanes (Watertown USBC)
Fort Drum Adult/Jr.	Summer	208	30	Pine Plains Bowling Center (Watertown USBC)
Standard Composite Average		229	247	
2008-2009				
Senior Co-Ed	Winter	0	0	Seaway Lanes (Watertown USBC)
Saturday Morning youth Senior	Winter	0	0	Lakeview Bowling Center (Syracuse USBC youth)
2007-2008				
Jr. King of the hill	Winter	0	0	Flamingo Bowl (Syracuse USBC youth)
Junior/Senior	Winter	230 (R)	81	Pine Plains bowling center (Watertown USBC youth)
Standard Composite Average		230 (R)	81	
2006-2007				
Jr. King of the Hill	Winter	223	40	Flamingo Bowl (Syracuse USBC youth)
Junior/Senior	Winter	220	75	Pine Plains bowling center (Watertown USBC youth)
Lakeview Sport Shot league	Summer	196	39	Lakeview Bowling Center (Syracuse USBC youth)
Standard Composite Average		221	115	
Sport Composite Average		196	39	
2005-2006				
Jr. King of the Hill	Winter	0	0	Lakeview Bowling Center (Syracuse USBC youth)
Pine Plains Jr./Sr.	Winter	242 (R)	78	Pine Plains Bowling Center (Watertown USBC youth)
Standard Composite Average		242 (R)	78	
