= V900 =

V900 or variation, may refer to:

- E-TEN V900, a Pocket PC phone
- LG V900, an LG mobile phone
- Bravia Chaimite V-900 armoured recovery vehicle
- Geely Galaxy V900, an extended-range electric minivan

== See also ==
- V90 (disambiguation)
