= 900s =

900s may refer to:

- 900s (century) AD, the period from 900 to 999, a century in the first millennium of the Common Era, almost synonymous with the 10th century (901–1000)
- 900s BC (century), a century in the first millennium Before Common Era
- 900s (decade) AD, the period from 900 to 909, a decade in the first millennium of the Common Era, almost synonymous with the 91st decade (901–910)
- 900s BC (decade), a decade in the first millennium Before Common Era

== See also ==
- S900 (disambiguation)
- 900 series (disambiguation)
