= V90 =

V90 may refer to:

== Automobiles ==
- Maxus V90, a light commercial van
- Volvo 960, an estate car manufactured 1990–1998
- Volvo V90, an estate car manufactured from 2016

== Other uses ==
- Conventional volt, a unit of measurement, symbol V_{90}
- DB Class V 90, a locomotive
- Hanlin eReader V90, an ebook reader
- ITU-T V.90, a telecommunications standard
- Vestas V90-2MW, a wind turbine
