= Caramel Jack =

English band from Brighton

- Origin: Brighton, England
- Genres: Americana, indie, alternative country, pop, folk, experimental
- Years active: 1995–present
- Labels: World of Furr (2000)
- Members: Joe Doveton; Richard Scott; Norman Walker; Simon Gunningham
- Website: www.facebook.com/CaramelJackMusic

Caramel Jack are an English pop, folk and experimental band, formed by Joe Doveton and Richard Scott in Brighton, England in 1995. They cite a broad range of influences including Miracle Legion, Pink Floyd, The KLF and The Triffids.

== Film ==
The tracks "King Solomon" and "Bring the Mountain", from their album Everybody Get Shot, were featured on the soundtrack of the 2006 film, We've Got the Toaster.

== TV ==
In 1996, the band appeared in an episode of the ITV Meridian show The Pier entitled "It's Not Only Rock And Roll", which also featured The Levellers, Kula Shaker, Gary Crowley and Chris Evans.

== Other activities ==
Richard Scott's music that was used in the 2007 documentary Traces of Lee Miller – Echoes from St. Malo, released by Hand Productions and the University of Sussex, about the photographer Lee Miller's coverage of the siege of the French town towards the end of World War II.

== Critical response ==
Uncut magazine has described their music as a "diversity (of) mind-spinning—country-folk to chamber-pop to burlesque with hip hop beats"

== Band members ==
- Joe Doveton (vocals)
- Richard Scott (guitar, keyboards, vocals)
- Michael Eyers (bass guitar)
- Simon Gunningham (drums)

== Discography ==
=== Albums ===
- The Curse of Caramel Jack (7-track CD EP) (1998)
- Everybody Get Shot (1999)
- Seven Brides for Caramel Jack (2001)
- Songs From Low Story (2004) – featuring B. J. Cole
- 1900 (2008)

=== Other appearances ===
The track "Modern Girls on Trains", which originally appeared on The Curse of Caramel Jack, was featured on the compilation album, Abuse Your Friends Vol.2 – Various Artists.
