= P900 =

P900 may refer to:

- Sony Ericsson P900, a Symbian OS v7.0 based smartphone
- Nikon Coolpix P900, a superzoom digital bridge camera
