= 900 series (bowling) =

Three consecutive perfect games by a bowler

A 900 series in ten-pin bowling refers to three consecutive perfect games bowled by an individual bowler. A 300 is a perfect score in one game, thus a player's maximum possible score would be 900 in a series of three consecutive games (the typical number of games in a single league session). To achieve the feat, a bowler would have to bowl 36 consecutive strikes.

== Sanctioning ==
To date in the United States, 44 individuals have bowled a total of 45 certified (or "sanctioned") 900 series – that is, 900s that have been officially recognized by the United States Bowling Congress (USBC), the sport's national governing body in the US. Steve Meyer of Spencerport, New York was the most recent to bowl a 900 series on November 7, 2026.

On 1 July 1982, Glenn Allison bowled the first 900 series to be recorded in sanctioned league play. He achieved this feat using a Columbia 300 plastic bowling ball with a conventional drilled grip, on wood lanes, and an oil pattern that would be sanctioned today as sport compliant. This accomplishment was not officially certified by the then-American Bowling Congress (ABC), which cited non-compliant lane conditions. To this day, there is a cult following supporting Glenn Allison and urging the USBC to officially recognize him as the first bowler to achieve a perfect series, especially because it was accomplished before the era of reactive bowling balls, and other scores in the bowling center that night were not unusually high. However, the USBC still refused to sanction Allison's 900 series after concluding a re-evaluation in 2014, stating among other things that it would call into question all other rejected honor score applications from that era.

In fact, the first six 900 series reported in ABC league play were all rejected for certification. The first perfect series to be officially sanctioned by the ABC/USBC was shot by collegiate bowler Jeremy Sonnenfeld on 2 February 1997 at Sun Valley Lanes bowling alley in Lincoln, Nebraska.

The first 900 in the history of the Professional Bowlers Association was bowled by Joe Scarborough on 22 April 2013 in a PBA50 Tour (formerly PBA Senior Tour) event. The PBA had seen three consecutive 300 games on one other occasion, by Norm Duke in 1996, but this was not considered to be an official 900 series because the games were not part of a contiguous set. The first two of Duke's 300 games were at the end of one round of play, and the third was at the beginning of the next round.

Robert Mushtare is the youngest bowler to have rolled a USBC-certified 900 series, doing so on 5 December 2005 at age 17 and is also currently the only bowler to have rolled a second certified 900, a feat achieved on 19 February 2006, less than 3 months after his first 900. On 11 January 2017, John Buchanan III became the oldest bowler (71) in USBC history to roll a sanctioned 900 series.

== The 900 Club ==
#	Name	Age	Hand	Location	Date
1	Jeremy Sonnenfeld	20	(R)	Lincoln, Nebraska	2 February 1997
2	Tony Roventini	28	(L)	Greenfield, Wisconsin	9 November 1998
2	Vince Wood	20	(R)	Moreno Valley, California	29 September 1999
4	Robby Portalatin	28	(L)	Jackson, Michigan	28 December 2000
5	James Hollywood “Bill Miller” Hylton	28	(R)	Salem, Oregon	2 May 2001
6	Jeff Campbell II	22	(R)	New Castle, Pennsylvania	12 June 2004
7	Darin Pomije	30	(R)	New Prague, Minnesota	9 December 2004
8	Robert Mushtare	17	(R)	Fort Drum, New York	3 December 2005
9	Lonnie Billiter Jr.	24	(R)	Fairfield, Ohio	13 February 2006
10	Robert Mushtare (2)	18	(R)	Fort Drum, New York	19 February 2006
11	Mark Wukoman	50	(R)	Greenfield, Wisconsin	22 April 2006
12	P. J. Giesfeldt	24	(R)	Milwaukee, Wisconsin	23 December 2006
13	Rich Jerome Jr.	29	(R)	Baltimore, Maryland	22 December 2008
14	Chris Aker	47	(L)	Winnemucca, Nevada	30 October 2009
15	Andrew Teall	24	(R)	Medford, New Jersey	2 November 2009
16	Andrew Mank	22	(R)	Belleville, Illinois	18 March 2010
17	William Howell III	22	(L)	Newburgh, New York	21 October 2010
18	Matt Latarski	23	(R)	Oakwood, Ohio	28 November 2010
19	Bob Kammer Jr	41	(R)	Merrillville, Indiana	9 January 2012
20	John Martorella Sr.	28	(R)	Greece, New York	12 April 2012
21	Jimmy Schmitzer	18	(R)	Norco, California	20 April 2012
22	James Williams	47	(R)	Wakefield, Rhode Island	16 April 2013
23	Joe Scarborough	50	(R)	Lady Lake, Florida	21 April 2013
24	Todd James	31	(R)	Laurel, Delaware	18 March 2014
25	Amos Gordon	29	(R)	Fort Carson, Colorado	11 April 2014
26	Earon Vollmar	26	(R)	Toledo, Ohio	19 January 2015
27	Hakim Emmanuel	38	(R)	Brockton, Massachusetts	19 February 2015
28	David Sewesky	27	(L)	Plymouth, Michigan	10 January 2016
29	Dale Gerhard	59	(R)	Linden, Pennsylvania	12 January 2016
30	Sean Osbourne	24	(R)	Cypress, Texas	22 November 2016
31	John Buchanan III	71	(R)	Evansville, Indiana	11 January 2017
32	Sam Esposito	26	(R)	Lockport, Illinois	3 February 2017
33	Brady Stearns	23	(R)	St. Cloud, Minnesota	28 March 2017
34	Joe Novara	26	(R)	East Islip, New York	16 October 2017
35	Jonathan Wilbur	36	(R)	North Clarendon, Vermont	14 January 2019
36	Jeremy Milito	26	(L)	Farmingdale, New York	25 April 2019
37	Wesley Low Jr.	23	(L)	Glendale, Arizona	19 July 2020
38	Cody Schmitt	26	(R)	Elkhart Lake, Wisconsin	17 November 2021
39	Stephen Kosela	42	(R)	Aliquippa, Pennsylvania	13 March 2022
40	Bryan Deck	44	(R)	New Castle, Indiana	20 June 2022
41	Desron Weatherspoon	42	(R)	Cheektowaga, New York	18 January 2025
42	Andrew Granite	35	(R)	Sacramento, California	14 November 2025
43	Erik Howard	23	(L)	Louisville, Kentucky	25 February 2026
44	Dylan Macon	33	(R)	Lubbock, Texas	18 June 2026
45	Steve Meyer	46	(R)	Greece, New York	7 November 2026
