= S900 =

S900 may refer to:

- Akai S900, a 1985 12-bit sampler
- Canon S900, a Canon S Series digital camera
- SuperMac S900, a Macintosh clone from 1996
- Yamaha PSR-S900, a portable keyboard

== See also ==
- 900s (disambiguation)
- 900 series (disambiguation) including 'series 900'
