= La Carrera (Siero) =

La Carrera (43°23′0″N 5°41′0″W) is a parish in Siero, a municipality within the province and autonomous community of Asturias, in northern Spain. It is located south of Highway N-634 and north of Highway A-64. The capital, Pola de Siero, is to the northeast.

== Villages and neighbourhoods ==
Following the 2011 Nomenclator, the parish of La Carrera is divided in these villages and neighbourhoods:

- El Berrón (3,473 inhabitants)
- La Carrera
- Ferrera
- Forfontía
- Les Granxes
- Mudarri (Mudarre)
- Nora (Ñora)
- La Parte
- Posada (Posá)
- Vega Muñiz (Vegamuñiz)
- Venta de Soto (La Venta Soto)
- Xixún
