= C90 =

C90 or C-90 may refer to:

== Science and technology ==
- Multiple myeloma and malignant plasma cell neoplasms (ICD-10 code)
- Caldwell 90 (NGC 2867), a planetary nebula in the constellation Carina
- C_{90}, the conventional electrical unit for the coulomb
- C90 audio cassette, a blank audio cassette in the very popular 90 (2 x 45) minute length

=== Computing ===
- Cray C90, a supercomputer
- C90 (C version), a standardized ISO C form of the C programming language, virtually the same as the ANSI C ("C89") standard

== Transportation ==
- Beechcraft C90 King Air, an aircraft
- Continental C90, an aircraft engine
- Honda Super Cub, an underbone motorcycle designated C90 in a 90 cc version
- Chicago terminal radar approach control, (FAA designation C90); See Air traffic control

== Other uses ==
- C90-CR (M3), a rocket launcher
- Ruy Lopez chess openings (ECO code)
