= Ford L series =

Ford L-series trucks
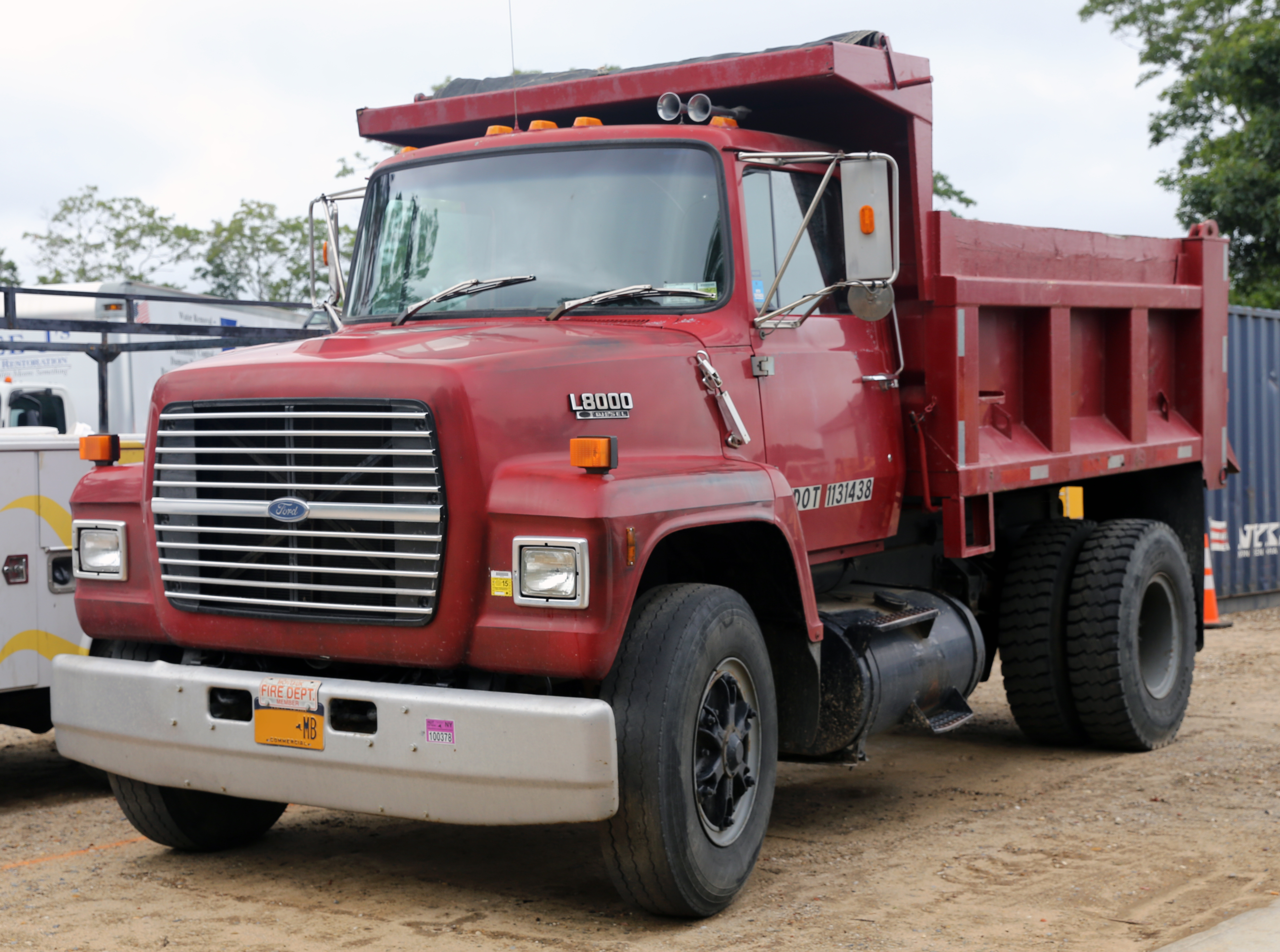
- 1989 Ford LN8000 single-axle dump truck

Overview
- Type: Medium-duty truck Heavy-duty truck
- Manufacturer: Ford Motor Company
- Also called: Ford LTL
- Production: 1970-1998; 1998-2009 (as Sterling)
- Assembly: United States: Louisville, Kentucky, (Kentucky Truck Assembly); Australia: Eagle Farm (Brisbane), Queensland (1975-1990s), Broadmeadows, Victoria (Broadmeadows Commercial Vehicle Plant)

Body and chassis
- Class: Class 6-8 truck
- Layout: Conventional cab

Chronology
- Predecessor: Ford F series Super Duty and N series
- Successor: Ford: F-650/F-750 Super Duty; Sterling Trucks: A-Line, L-Line, Acterra

The Ford L-series is a range of commercial trucks that were assembled and marketed by Ford between 1970 and 1998. The first dedicated Class 8 conventional truck developed by the company, the L-Series was colloquially named the "Louisville Line", denoting the Kentucky Truck Plant that assembled the trucks. The successor to the Ford N-series and the Ford F-900/1000 Super Duty, the line was a Class 6-8 truck. Slotted above the medium-duty F-Series, the L-Series was produced over a wide variety of applications through its production life, including both straight trucks and semitractors.

The L-Series was produced in Louisville, Kentucky, alongside medium-duty F-Series trucks; at various times, it was also produced alongside the C-Series COE (and the CF-series Cargo that replaced it). For its second generation introduced in 1996, the Ford Louisville nickname became the official name for the model line. Sold primarily as a semitractor, the aerodynamically enhanced Ford Aeromax served as a flagship model for both generations.

After the 1996 sale of the Ford heavy-truck line to Freightliner, the production of the second-generation L-Series was transferred from Ford to Freightliner during 1998. The model line continued under the Sterling Trucks nameplate, lasting through 2009.

== Background ==
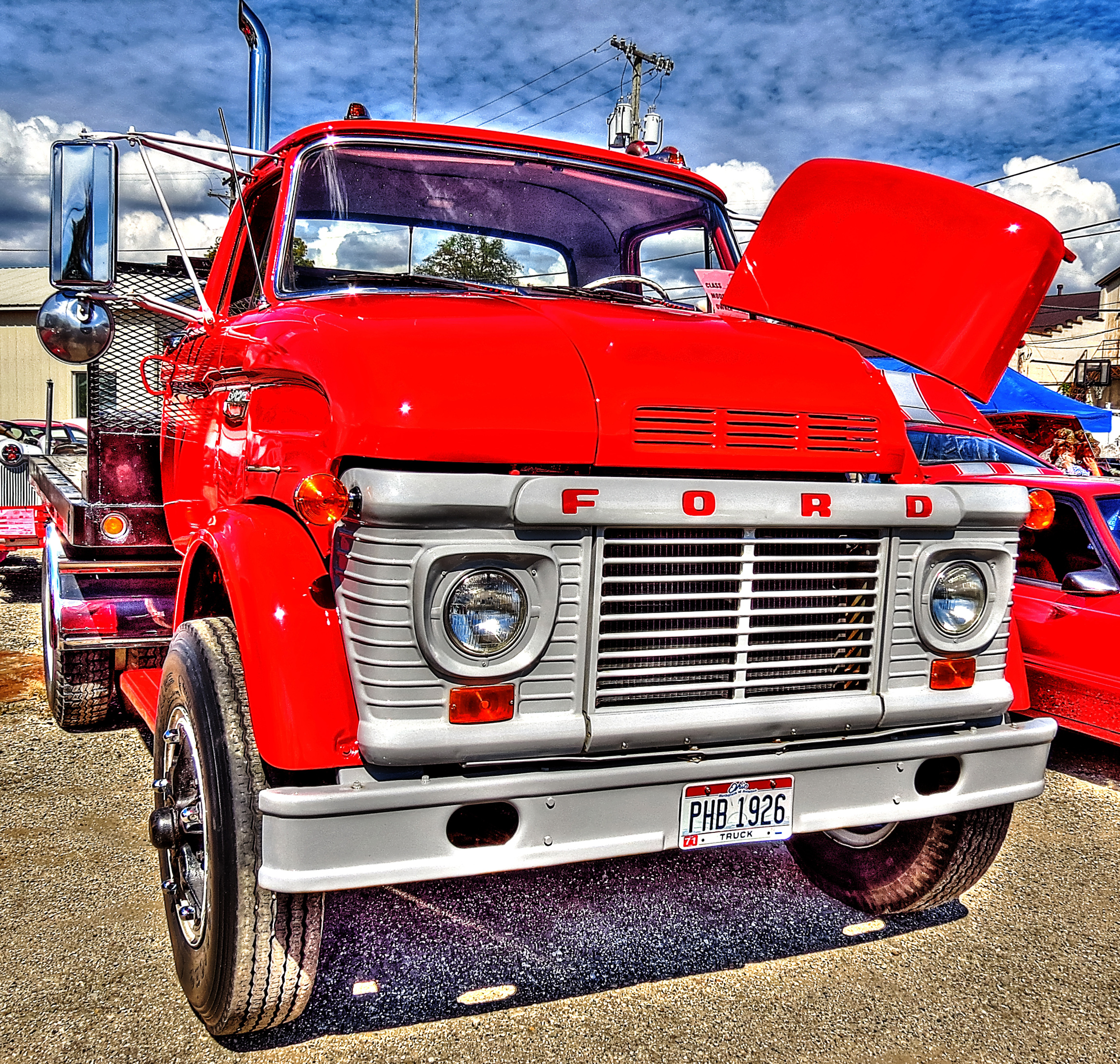
A 1964 Ford N-Series truck, one of the two predecessors to the L-Series

Following the 1957 introduction of the C-series low-cab COE, Ford began to transition its heavy-truck lineup away from models derived from the F-Series line. In 1961, the Super Duty F-Series (F-750 to F-1100) was redesigned with a heavier-duty chassis, sharing only its cab with smaller F-Series trucks. The same year, Ford introduced the H-Series heavy truck. Derived from the C-Series, the H-Series mounted the cab higher on an all-new chassis with a forward-mounted axle (taking on the "Two-Story Falcon" nickname); while a Super Duty V8 was standard, the optional Cummins NH inline-6 was the first factory-installed diesel offered in a Ford truck.

For 1963, Ford introduced the N-Series, a short-hood conventional truck. Similar in concept to the 1948-1956 "cab-forward" C-Series, the all-new design moved the cab upward and forward (the latter, to shorten the overall length of the vehicle). Sharing much of its front bodywork with the H-Series, the N-Series derived its cab structure from the F-Series.

In 1966, the H-Series "Two-Story Falcon" was replaced by the W-Series Class 8 COE. A clean-sheet design (distinguished by its straight-edged design), the W-Series was offered solely with diesel engines; to save weight, an all-aluminum cab was offered as an option (alongside the standard steel cab)

At the end of the 1960s, Ford began construction of Kentucky Truck Assembly, adding a dedicated facility in Louisville for commercial truck production. In 1969, the facility opened, with Louisville Assembly moving entirely to cars (later joined by light trucks). Coinciding with the construction of the assembly facility, Ford sought to consolidate the N-Series and the heavy F-Series into a single, all-new product line.

With the "L" in L-Series denoting its Louisville origins, the new product line featured a larger cab, adding the front-hinged hood adopted by the Mack R-series, Kenworth W900, and Peterbilt 352.

== First generation (1970–1995) ==
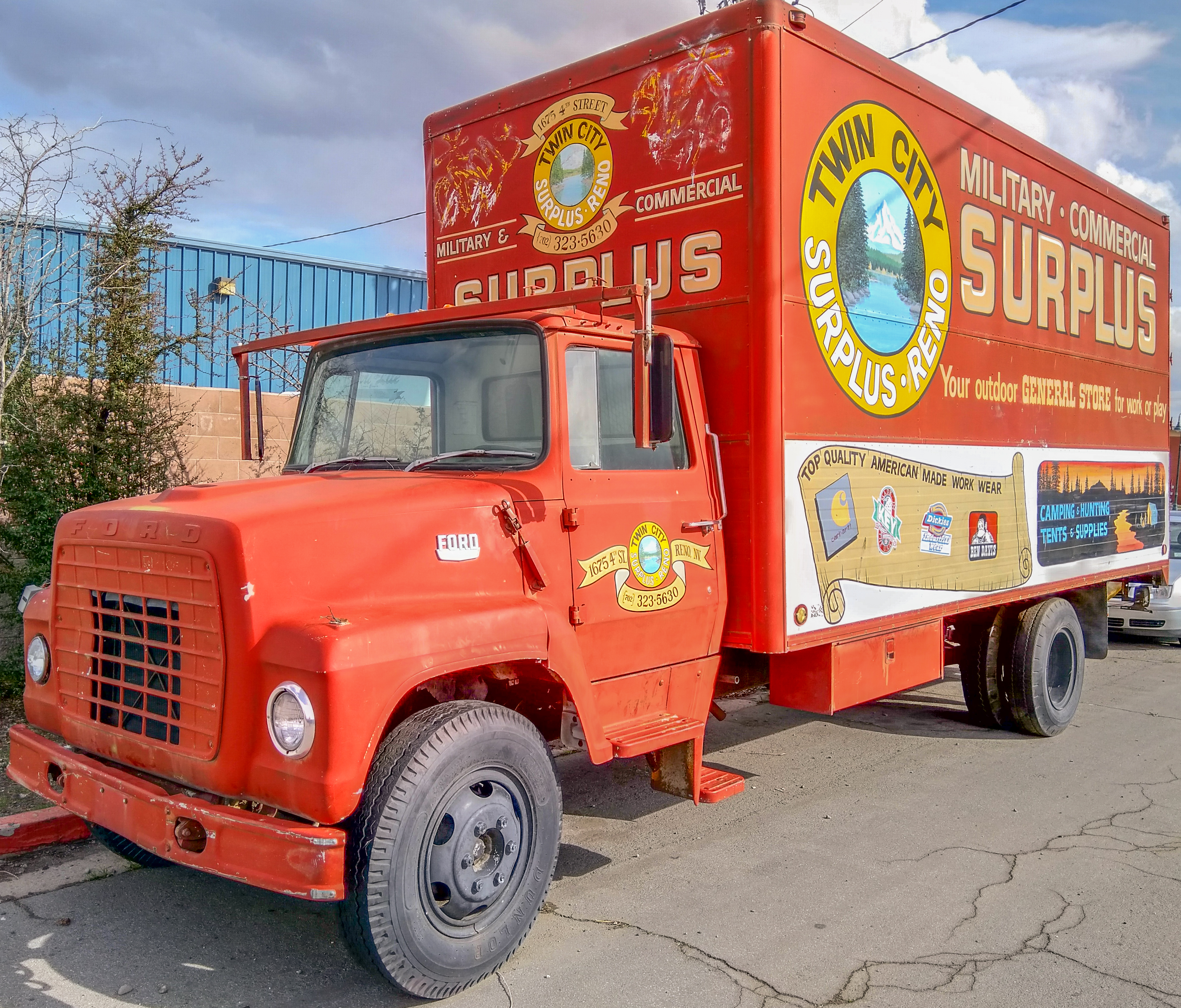
1973 Ford L600 box truck

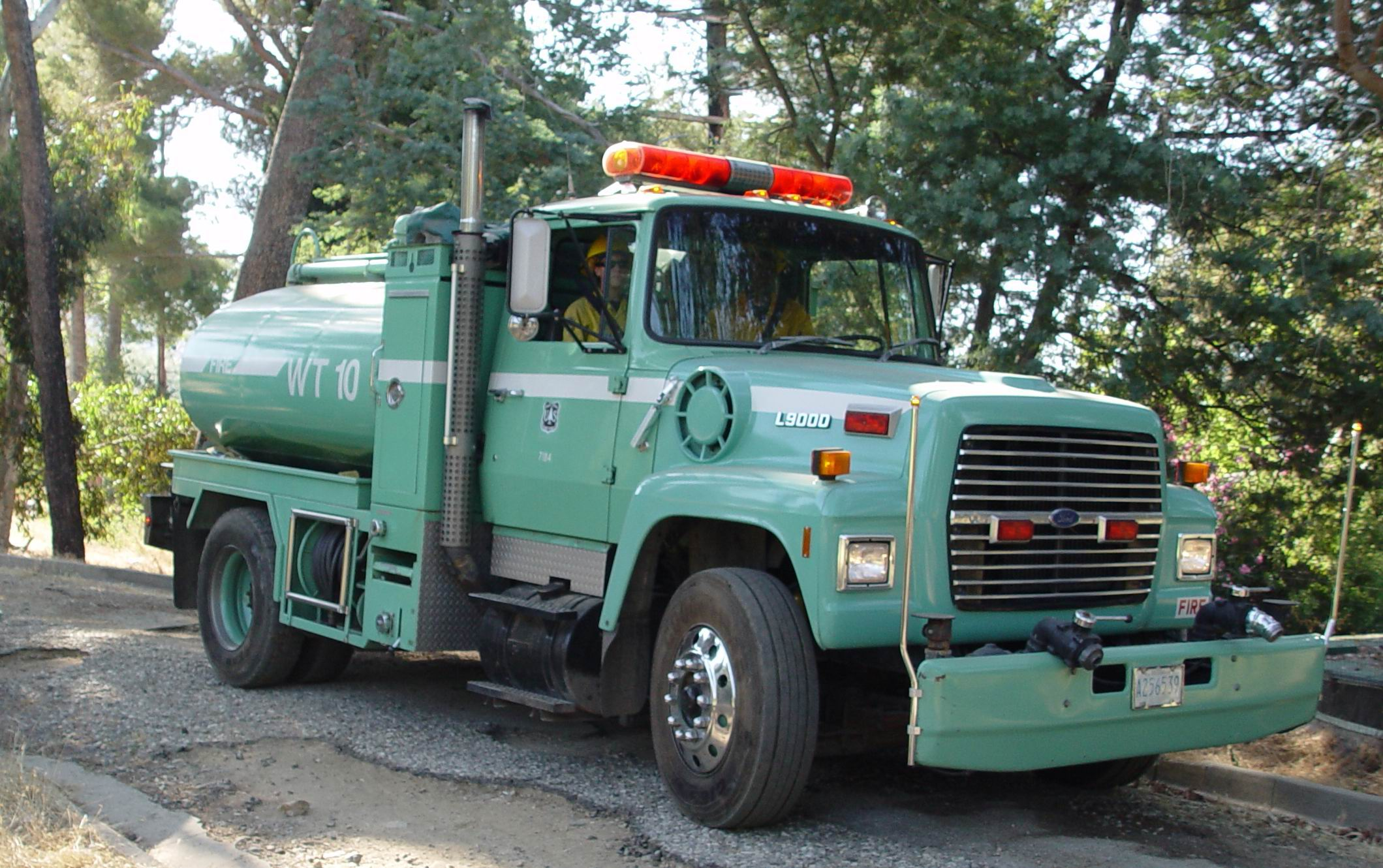
Ford L9000 Fire tank truck

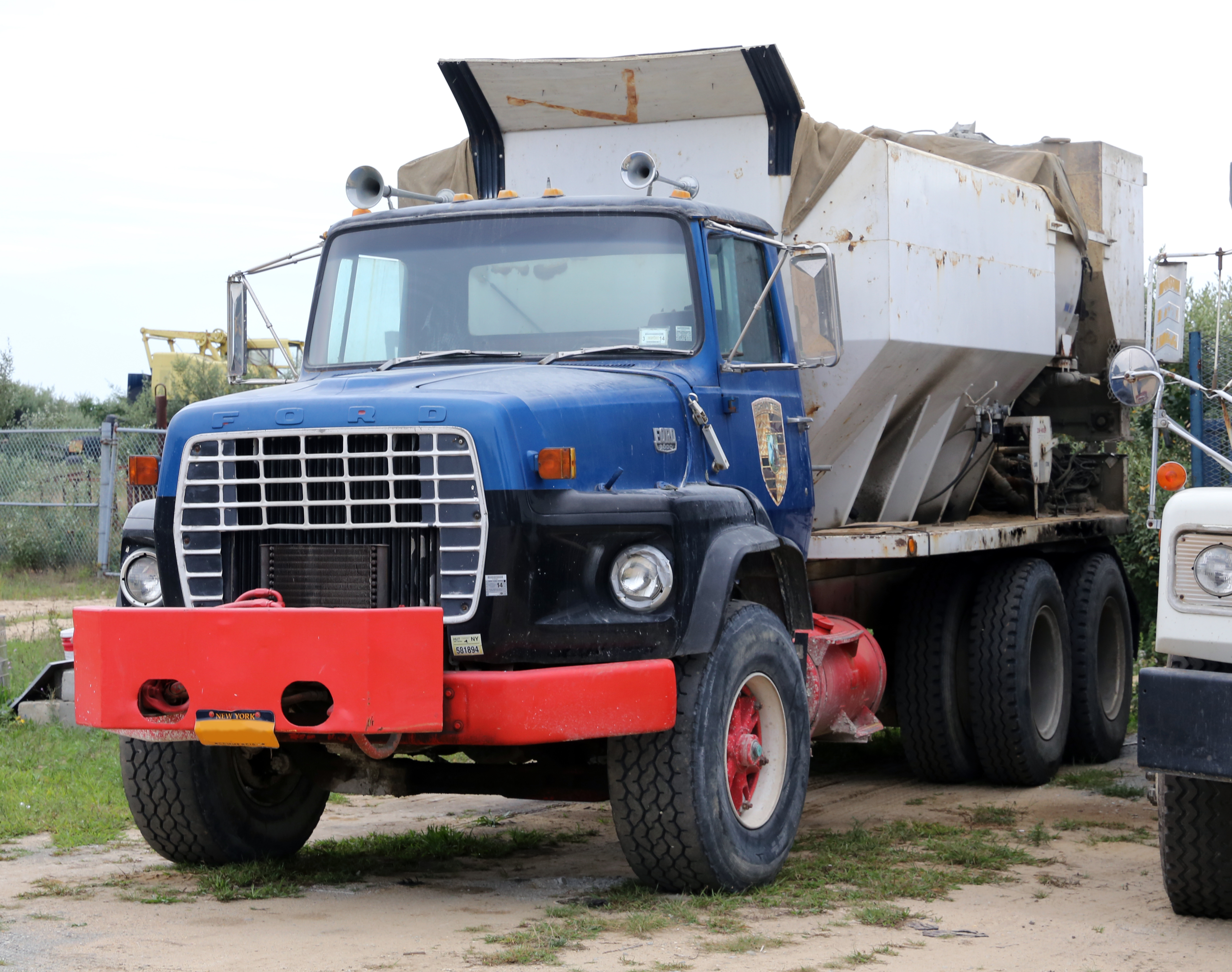
1981 Ford LTS 9000 concrete mixer

For 1970, the L-series was introduced in four size ranges and two hood lengths and grille styles, and with single or tandem (denoted by the "T" in the model designation) rear axles. Powertrains included a wide range of gasoline and diesel engines, based on GVWR.

In 1971, Ford introduced a set-back front axle configuration. For the rest of the 1970s, the L-series saw few major changes. In 1976, the LL/LTL-9000 was introduced. Designed as a truck for long-haul drivers, the LTL-9000 was a competitor to the GMC General, Kenworth W900, Mack Super-Liner, and Peterbilt 359. Fitted with a set-forward front axle and a longer hood, this version had more room for larger powertrains. In 1981, Ford gave the LL/LTL-9000 its own grille and headlight styling, including one of the first uses of the Ford Blue Oval in North America.

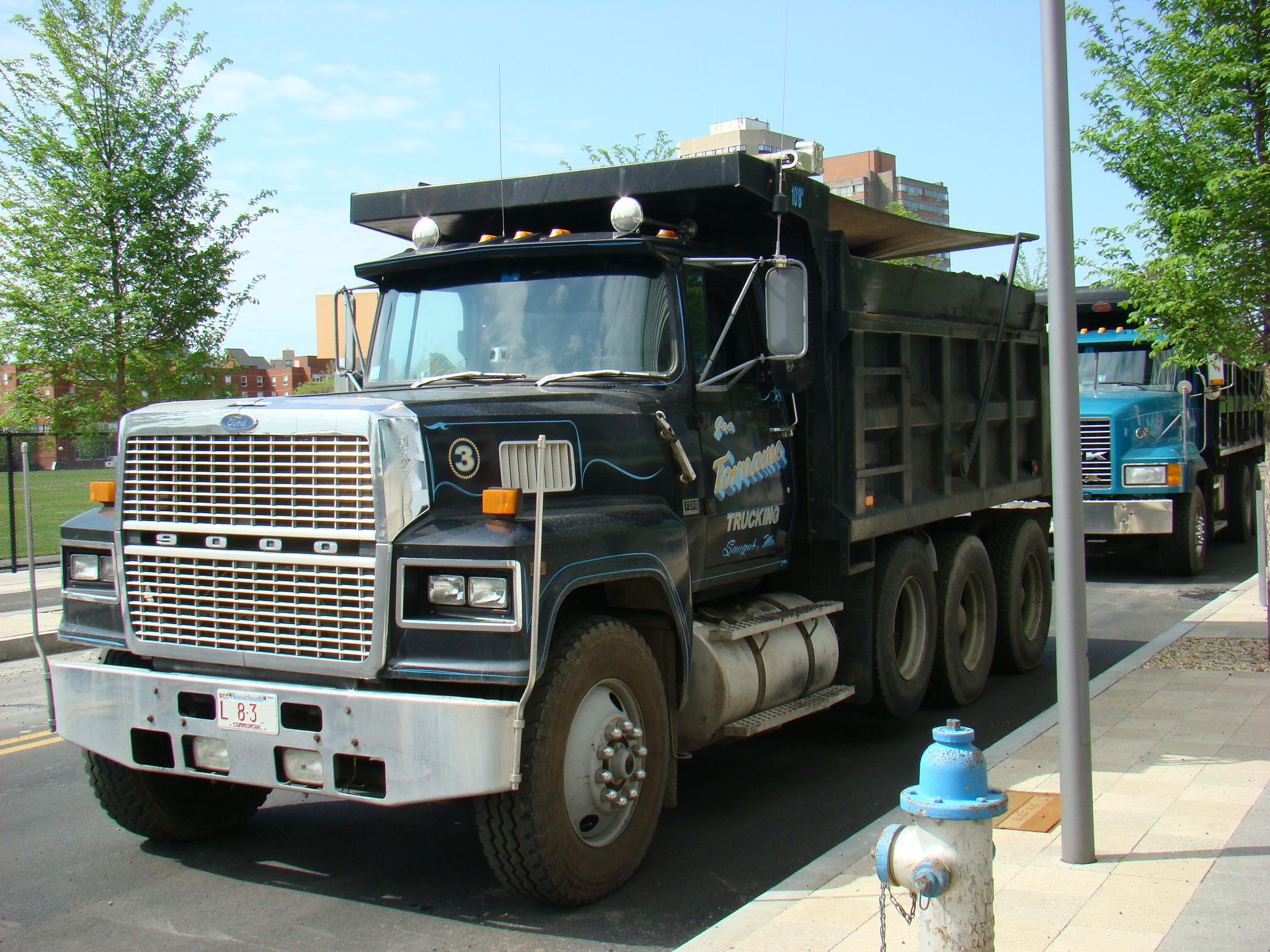
Ford LTL9000 dump truck

Although the L-series had few revisions throughout its production, elements of its design were used in other Ford vehicles. In 1974, the W-series cabover received a larger grille similar to the chrome version on the L series. For 1978, the F-series/Bronco grille was given a similar egg-crate grille pattern. In the 1980 redesign of the medium-duty F- series, the hexagonal shape of the grille was carried over; it is a theme used in all Super Duty trucks since their 1998 introduction.

In 1984 (as 1985 model year), the rest of the L-series became one of the last North American Fords to adopt the Ford Blue Oval; as with the LTL-9000, it was placed above the grille. In 1988, the L-series changed its grille design from an egg-crate design to that of horizontal chrome bars; the Ford Blue Oval became centered. In addition, rectangular headlights became standard in 1991.

In 1992 was the introduction of the set-back front axle version of the LL/LTL-9000, designated the LLS and LTLS-9000, along with the corresponding Aeromax versions that had more aerodynamic bumpers and optional chassis skirting.

=== Aeromax (1988–1995) ===
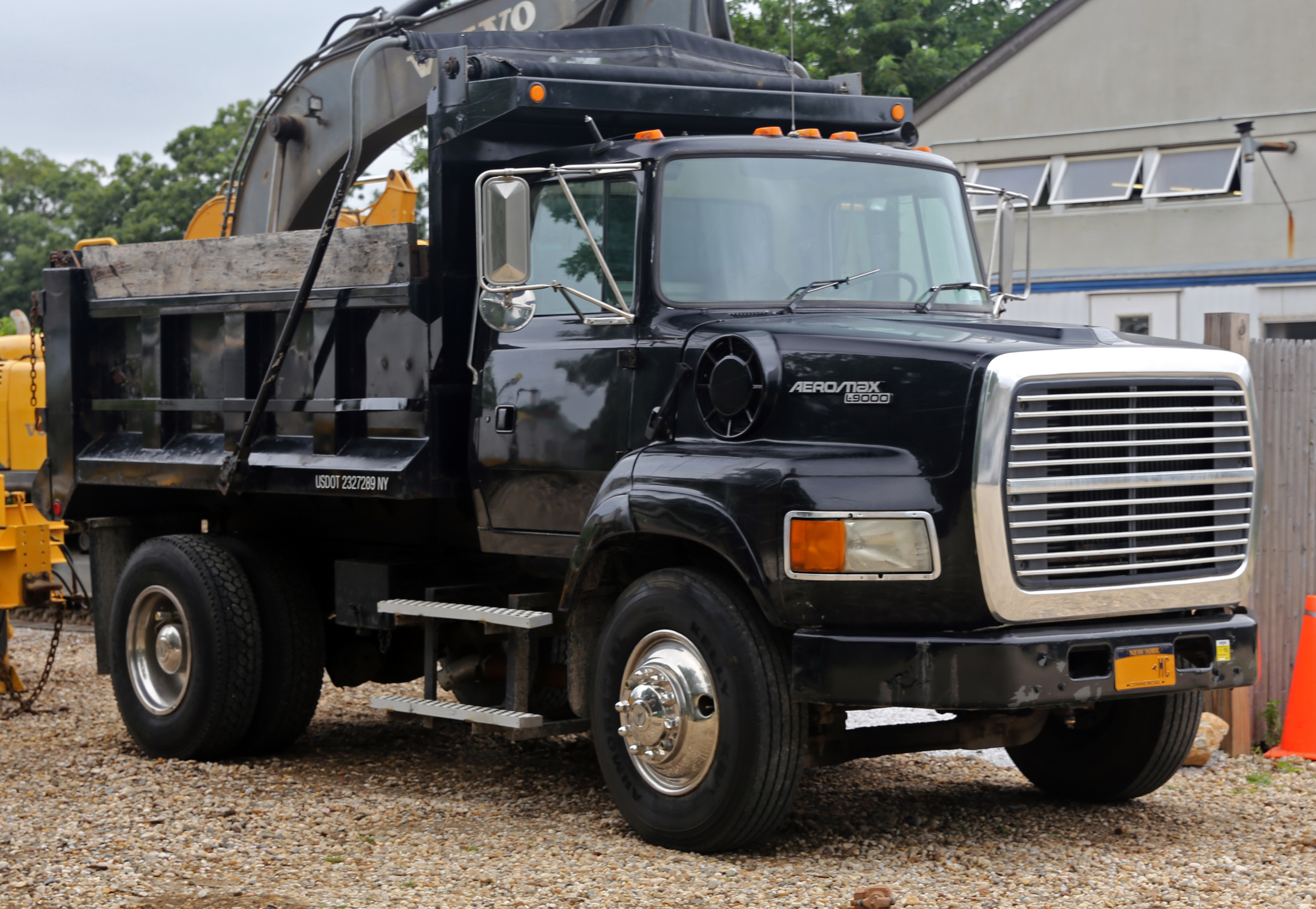
1995 Ford Aeromax dump truck

As a response to the aerodynamic Kenworth T600, for 1988, Ford introduced its own aerodynamic semitractor. Named AeroMax L9000, the new design was an extensive upgrade of the L-9000. While sharing the same cab of the medium-hood LS-9000, the Aeromax used a set-back front axle to add a form-fitting front bumper with swept front fenders. For the first time in a North American truck, automotive-style composite headlights were used. Other aerodynamic enhancements included skirted fuel tanks and a specially designed "Aero Bullet" sleeper unit. The Aeromax L9000 was one of the most aerodynamic trucks in North America upon its introduction in 1988.

Following its introduction as a semitractor, the AeroMax line expanded into the vocational truck lineup alongside the rest of the Ford L series. A later LA-8000 was introduced for "Baby 8" intra-city delivery.

In 1992 was the introduction of the extended-hood, set-back front axle Aeromaxes, designated LLA and LTLA-9000. These featured optional full-length chassis skirting, along with the same aero headlights and bumpers of the older medium-hood LA series.

=== Models ===
The L-series came in a total of four size ranges, designated by GVWR. As with previous Ford heavy-truck tradition, gasoline-engine trucks received a three-digit model number, while diesel-engine trucks were given a four-digit model number. L-600/L-6000 and L-700/L-7000 series were Class 6/7 medium-duty trucks, typically sold as straight trucks. L-800/L-8000 trucks were Class 8 trucks, typically sold in severe-service configurations. L-900/L-9000 chassis were available in all axle configurations, but were typically sold as semitractors; the LTL-9000 was only sold with a diesel engine.

1973–1977 Models

Model	Max. GVWR (Note: Gross Vehicle Weight Rating is the loaded weight of the truck.)	Engine (Note: Standard engine unless noted.)	Trans (Note: Speeds in manual(M), automatic(A).)
LN 600	24,000 lb (11,000 kg)	361 V8	5M, 4A
LN 700/7000	27,500 lb (12,500 kg)	361 V8/V175	10M, 4A
L 800/8000	35,000 lb (16,000 kg)	361 V8/V175	13 M
LT 800	46,000 lb (21,000 kg)	475 V8 (Note: Highest rated optional engine.)	13M
LT 8000	61,000 lb (28,000 kg) (Note: LNT 54,000 lb (24,000 kg) LTS 64,000 lb (29,000 kg).)	V-225	
L 900/9000	35,000 lb (16,000 kg)	401 V8/NH230	
LT 900/9000	61,000 lb (28,000 kg)	475 V8 / 3406	5x4M
LL 9000			
LTL 9000			
LTLS 9000 (Note: From 1992)			

=== Powertrain ===
Almost all models had at least one engine option, the 9000 series had several. The 600–800 series had a Ford 330, 361, or 389 V8 standard, 700–900 had a 477 or 534 V8 optional. The 900 series had a 401 V8 standard. In 1979, the 361 or 389 V8 was replaced by a 370, and the 401 V8 was replaced by a 429; the 477 or 534 V8 remained as options. Detroit 6-71, 6-92, 8-71, and 8-92 engines were options, also.

The 7000 and 8000 series had a Caterpillar V175 standard, the 7000 had a V200, and the 8000 had a V225 available. The 9000 series had a Cummins NH230 standard, Cummins N-series with up to 350 hp (261 kW), and Caterpillar 3406 series up to 375 hp (280 kW) were optional.

1973 engines (not all are shown)

Model	Displacement	Type (Note: Gasoline (G), diesel (D), turbocharged (T), inline (I), (V), and number of cylinders)	Power	Torque	Notes
Ford 361 V8	361 cu in (5.9 L)	G V8	138 hp (103 kW)	250 lb⋅ft (340 N⋅m)	Std 6/7/800
Ford 401 V8	401 cu in (6.6 L)	G V8	171 hp (128 kW)	274 lb⋅ft (371 N⋅m)	Std 900
Cat. V175	522 cu in (8.6 L)	D V8	175 hp (130 kW)	352 lb⋅ft (477 N⋅m)	Std 7/8000
Cat. V225	636 cu in (10.4 L)	D V8	225 hp (168 kW)	530 lb⋅ft (720 N⋅m)	Opt 8000
Cum. NH230	855 cu in (14.0 L)	D I6	230 hp (172 kW)		Std 9000
Cum. NTC350	855 cu in (14.0 L)	DT I6	350 hp (261 kW)		Opt 9000
Cat. 3406	893 cu in (14.6 L)	DT I6	375 hp (280 kW)	1,091 lb⋅ft (1,479 N⋅m)	Opt 9000

== Second generation (1996–1998) ==
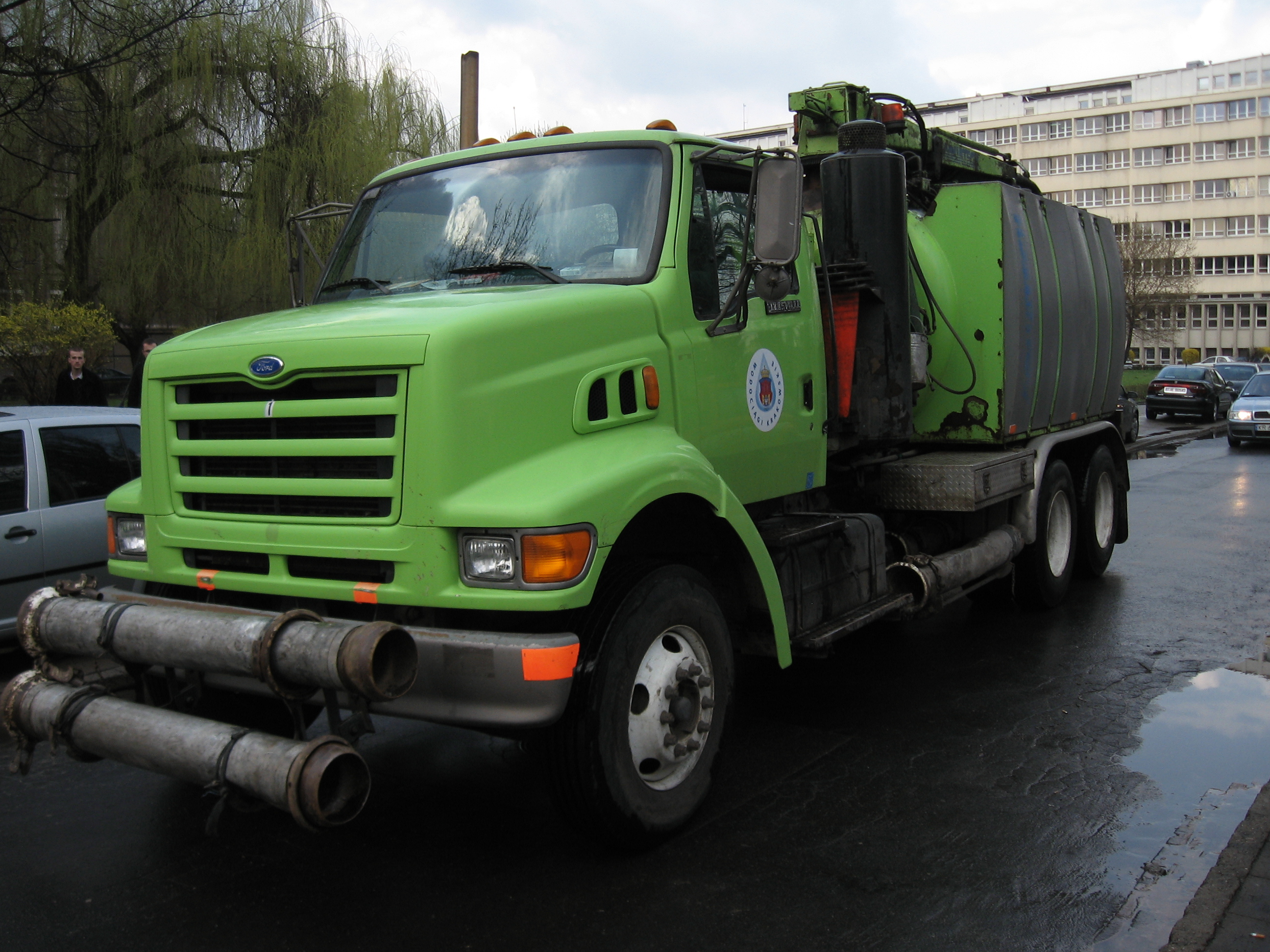
1996–1998 Ford Louisville in Poland

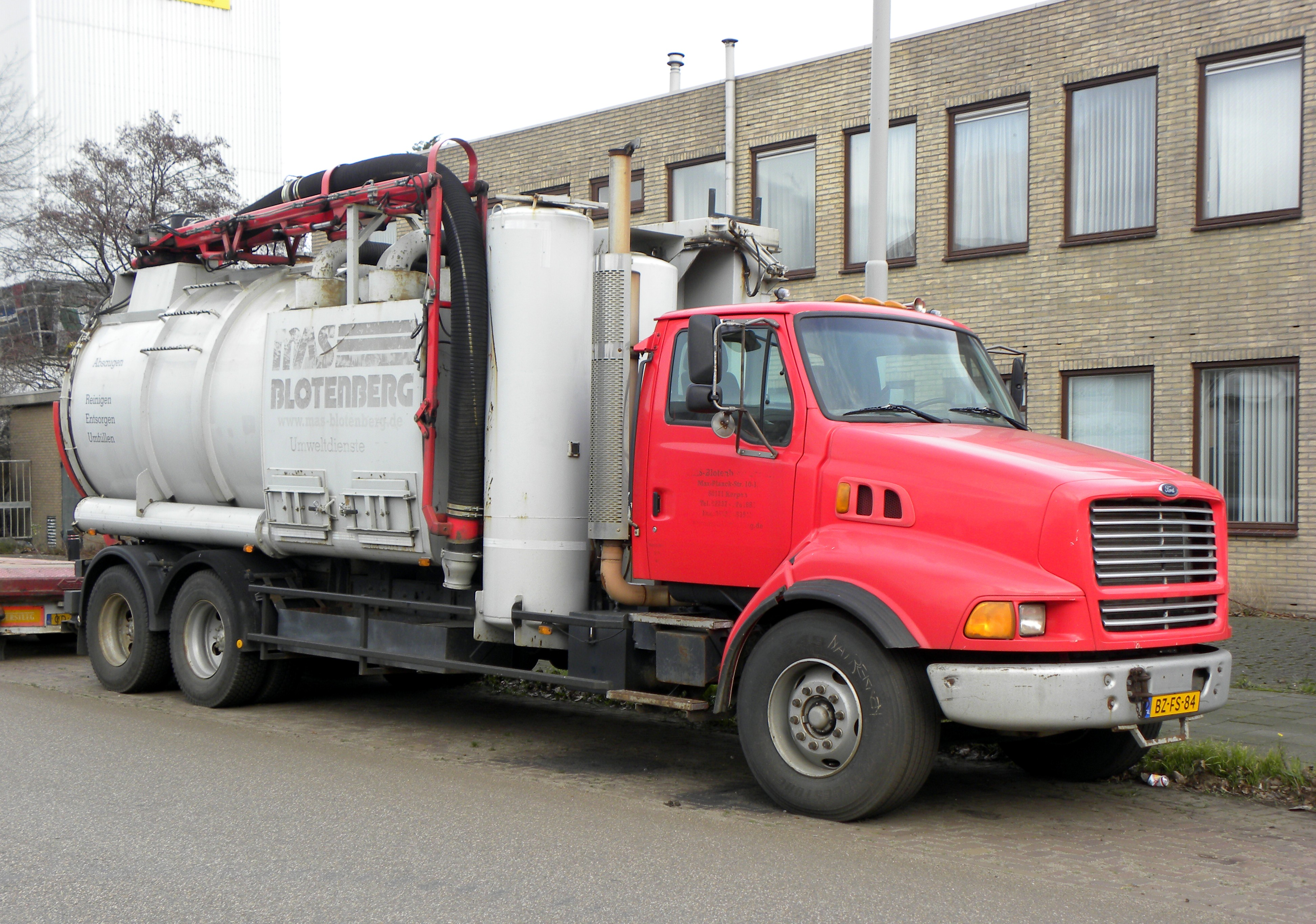
Ford Aeromax 9500 in Europe

For 1996, the Ford heavy-truck lines were redesigned; the second-generation heavy-truck line was nearly exclusively for Class 8 weight ranges.

Chassis weights were increased, front axle GAWRs (Note: Gross Axle Weight Rating is the loaded weight of the axle.) were available up to 20,000 lb (9,100 kg), single rear axles to 23,000 lb (10,000 kg) as before, and tandem rear axles to 46,000 lb (21,000 kg). On tandems, a walking beam type was standard and two different air suspensions were available.

In the redesign, both the Aeromax and Louisville gained a wider cab with a sloping windshield. Although Aeromax models lost their composite headlights, it gained a much larger slope to the hood. To aid ergonomics, the Aeromax and Louisville borrowed many interior controls from other Ford vehicles. Another redesign was the grille bars; in the second generation, the trucks that had extended frame bumpers knocked of the "middle" full painted piece off the grille.

=== Models ===
As was the case previously, the heavy-truck line was split into aerodynamically optimized semitractors (the newly renamed Aeromax 9500) and vocational/severe-service trucks. In the case of the latter, the popularity of the Louisville nickname led Ford to drop the L-series nomenclature and adopt the Louisville nameplate officially.

1996 models

Model	Max. GVWR	Engine	Trans
LN 6000	35,000 lb (16,000 kg)		
LN 7000	35,000 lb (16,000 kg)		
L 8000	35,000 lb (16,000 kg)	mid-range	
LT 8000	64,000 lb (29,000 kg) (Note: LTS 66,000 lb (30,000 kg).)	mid-range	
L 9000	35,000 lb (16,000 kg)		
LT 9000	64,000 lb (29,000 kg)		
LA 8000 (Note: Aeromax)	35,000 lb (16,000 kg)	mid-range	
LA 9000	35,000 lb (16,000 kg)		
LTA 9000	60,000 lb (27,000 kg)		
LL 9000	35,000 lb (16,000 kg)		
LTL 9000	60,000 lb (27,000 kg)		

=== Powertrain ===
The second generation did not offer gasoline or diesel V8s; all engines were inline-6 turbocharged diesels. The Caterpillar 3406 and Cummins N14 (the evolution of the NTC series) continued as heavy-duty engines in the 9000 models.

1996 engines (Not all are shown)

Model	Displacement	Type (Note: Mid-range (Mid), heavy Duty (HD), electronic control (E), overhead cam (O))	Power	Torque
Cat. 3176	629 cu in (10.3 L)	Mid	325 hp (242 kW)	975 lb⋅ft (1,322 N⋅m)
Cat. 3406	893 cu in (14.6 L)	HD E	475 hp (354 kW)	1,650 lb⋅ft (2,240 N⋅m)
Cum. L10	611 cu in (10.0 L)	Mid	260 hp (190 kW)	975 lb⋅ft (1,322 N⋅m)
Cum. N14	855 cu in (14.0 L)	HD E	460 hp (340 kW)	1,650 lb⋅ft (2,240 N⋅m)
DD Series 60	677 cu in (11.1 L)	E O		
DD Series 60	775 cu in (12.7 L)	HD E O	450 hp (340 kW)	1,550 lb⋅ft (2,100 N⋅m)

== End of Ford production (1998) ==
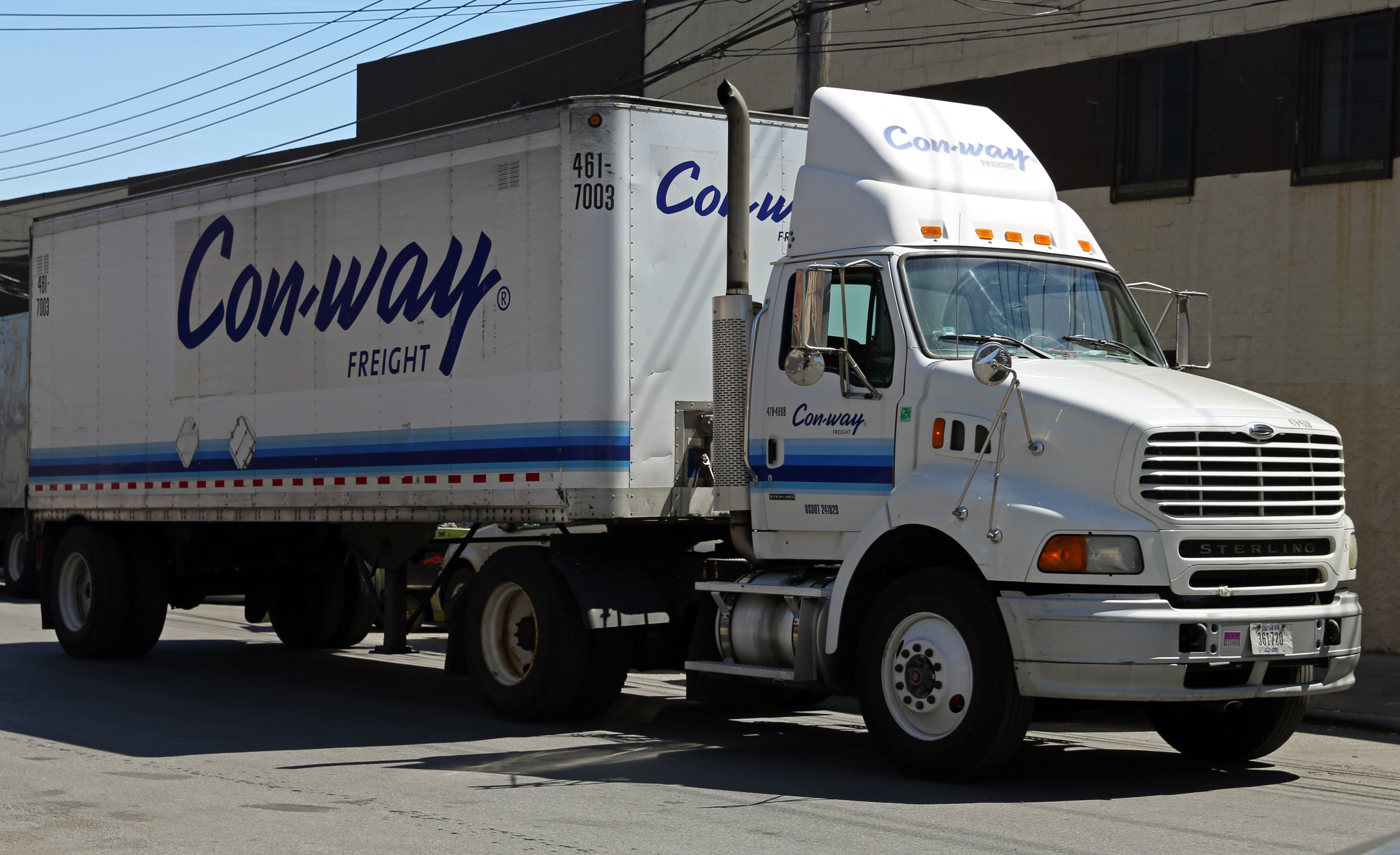
Sterling A-Line 9500

At the end of 1996, Ford completed the sale of its heavy-truck operations, selling the rights and production tools of the Louisville, Aeromax, and Cargo to Freightliner. Ford ended production of the Louisville/Aeromax in 1998; the truck lines re-entered production as Sterling Trucks from 1998 to 2009; both lines were produced concurrently by Ford and Freightliner during 1998.

In 1998, Sterling began production in St. Thomas, Ontario, Canada, of their L-Line 7500, 8500, 9500, and A-Line 9500. A Mercedes Benz diesel was introduced late in 2000, and a very low-profile "CarHauler" model was developed; otherwise very little change occurred between 1998 and 2008. Production ended in 2009.

== Resources ==
- American Truck & Bus Spotter's Guide: 1920–1985, by Tad Burness.
- Ford Trucks Since 1905, by James K. Wagner.
- Ford Heavy Duty Trucks 1948–1998, by Paul G. McLaughlin.
- Ford Truck Chronicles: by the Auto Editors of Consumers Guide.
