= E90 =

E90 can refer to:

== Transportation ==
- BMW 3 Series (E90), an automobile platform
- Embraer 190, an aircraft
- European route E90
- Toyota Corolla (E90), an automobile platform
- Sakai Senboku Road, route E90 in Japan

== Other uses ==
- Nokia E90 Communicator, a 3G smartphone
- King's Indian Defense (ECHO code: E90), a chess opening
- E-90 Super Sweeper, a robot that appears in Sonic X
