= 990 (disambiguation) =

990 may refer to:

- Year 990
- EgyptAir Flight 990
- Form 990, "Return of Organization Exempt From Income Tax," a form from the Internal Revenue Service of the United States
- List of highways numbered 990
- 990 AM - the frequency of some radio stations
