= W900 =

W900 may refer to:

- Sony Ericsson W900i, a mobile phone
- Kenworth W900, a long-haul transport truck
