= 900 series =

900 series or series 900 or variation, may refer to:

- 900 series (bowling), three consecutive perfect games by an individual bowler
- AMD 900 chipset series, set of chipsets released in 2011
- Euskotren 900 series, a train type
- GeForce 900 series, family of graphics processing units developed by Nvidia
- Karosa 900 series, collective term for several modifications of a bus which was produced by Czech company Karosa in the town Vysoké Mýto from 1994 to 2007
- Lotus 900 series, their first self-developed engine
- Saab 900, an automobile
- Volvo 900 Series, range of executive cars produced from 1990 to 1998

== See also ==
- S900 (disambiguation)
