= 900s BC (decade) =

Decade

The 900s BC is a decade that lasted from 909 BC to 900 BC.

== Events and trends ==
- 909 BC — Jeroboam, the first king of the northern Hebrew kingdom of Israel, dies and is succeeded by his son Nadab. An alternate of this date is 910 BC.
- c. 900 BC — the Adichanallur relics, from Tamilnadu Culture, India are 2,900 years old: The Archaeological Survey of India (ASI)
- c. 900 BC — the Villanovan culture emerges in northern Italy (Villanovan II).
- c. 900 BC — Foundation of Anuradhapura, Sri Lanka.
- c. 900 BC — Greek Dark Ages end.
- c. 900 BC — Geometric period of vases starts in Ancient Greece.
- c. 900 BC — The inhabitants of the Aegean region establish small, distinct groups in valleys, on coastal plains and on islands, living in self-sufficient, close-knit communities but all speaking some form of the same language.
- c. 900 BC — San Lorenzo, the center of early Olmec culture, is destroyed, probably by migrating peoples from the north, and power passes to La Venta in Tabasco.
- c. 900 BC — La Venta starts to thrive.
- c. 900 BC — Colossal head (no. 4) from La Venta, Mexico, is made. Olmec culture. It is now kept at La Venta Park, Villahermosa, Tabasco, Mexico.
- c. 900 BC – 600 BC — Great Pyramid and ball court, La Venta, Mexico, is built. Olmec culture.

== Significant people ==
- Jeroboam, the first king of the northern Hebrew kingdom of Israel, dies.
- Osorkon II, king of Egypt, is born (approximate date).
- Ahab, king of Israel, is born (approximate date).
- Jehoshaphat, king of Judah, is born (approximate date).
