= Murphy-Hoffman Company =

Privately owned multi-state network of truck dealerships

- Type: Private
- Industry: Automotive; Financial services Truck Leasing and Rental; Truck Parts; Truck Service; Factoring (finance)
- Founded: Springfield, MO, United States, (January 2, 1975)
- Headquarters: Leawood, Kansas
- Number of locations: Over 100 Locations
- Divisions: Kenworth
- Subsidiaries: Arkansas Kenworth, Inc.; Colorado Kenworth, Inc.; Georgia Kenworth, Inc.; Kansas Kenworth, Inc.; MHC Financial Services, Inc.; MHC Truck Leasing, Inc.; MHC Truck Source, Inc.; North Carolina Kenworth, Inc.; Oklahoma Kenworth, Inc.; Ozark Kenworth, Inc.; Southland Truck Center, Inc.; Tennessee Kenworth, Inc.; Texas Kenworth Company; Transportation Resources, Inc.
- Website: https://www.mhc.com/

Murphy-Hoffman Company (MHC) is a privately owned multi-state network of truck dealerships and leasing locations, providing truck-related services. Founded in Springfield, Missouri, as of 2022 it is based in Leawood, Kansas.

== History ==
MHC was founded in 1975 in Springfield Mo., as Ozark Kenworth, Inc. by Reed Murphy Senior and Ken Hoffman. Starting with a temporary facility with only three employees, MHC today operates more than 130 locations across 19 states, including heavy and medium duty truck dealerships, full-service leasing and rental locations, transport refrigeration locations, TRP Parts retail stores, dump body manufacturing and a finance company.

== Business ==
MHC's divisions support the heavy and medium duty truck industry with dealerships, truck leasing and rental dealerships, transport refrigeration dealerships and MHC Financial Services.

=== Truck Dealerships ===
MHC operates over 135 truck dealerships throughout its network, offering new Kenworth, Volvo, Ford, Hino and Isuzu truck sales, all-makes and models used truck sales, all-makes parts.

=== Truck Leasing and Rental ===
MHC Truck Leasing manages more than 4,700 trucks for a wide range of businesses.

=== Transport Refrigeration ===
MHC runs four Carrier-Transicold dealerships that carry an array of replacement parts for both Carrier and Thermo King refrigeration units.

== Reception ==
MHC has earned Kenworth's North American Dealer of the Year Award over 14 times in the last 30 years. The company has also received the Kansas City Business Journal's Champions of Business Award two times in the last five years.

== Operations ==
MHC operates dealerships across 19 states. Additionally, the company owns and operates its RoadReady Center, a pre-delivery inspection facility in Chillicothe, Ohio, Truck Source, a network of used truck dealerships, RoadForce, a private all-makes parts label, and the first TRP All-Makes Parts and Service store in Grandview, Mo.

== See also ==
- PACCAR
- Kenworth
- Class 8 Trucks
- Semi-trailer truck
- Dump truck
- Hino
- Ford
- Volvo
