= Gadi Fraiman =

Israeli artist and sculptor

Gadi Fraiman גדי פריימן
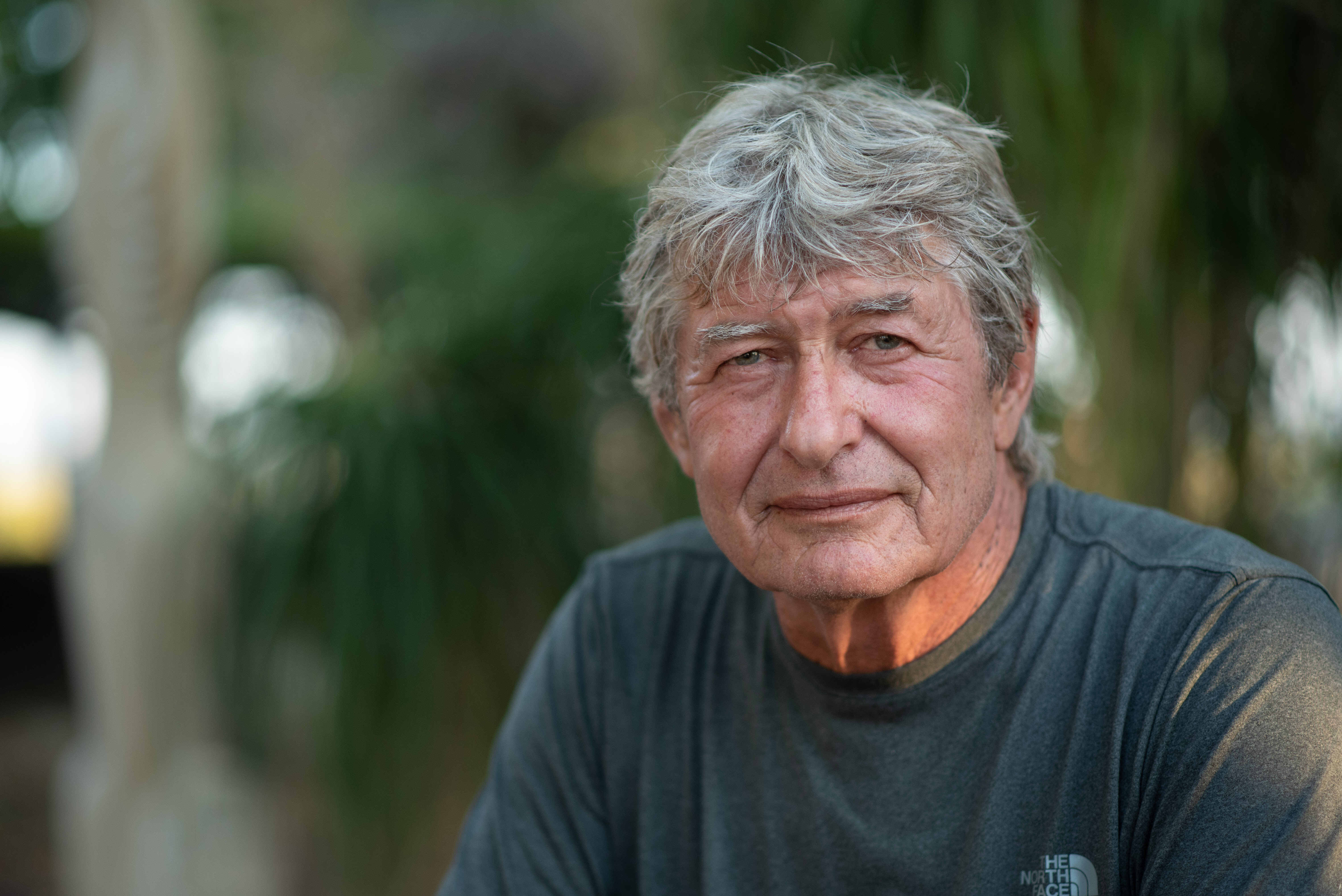
- Born: October 25, 1958 (age 68); Łódź, Poland
- Known for: Bronze and stone sculptor
- Website: https://gadifraiman.com/

Gadi Fraiman (Hebrew: גדי פריימן) is an Israeli sculptor and painter. He is best known for his work with painted bronze sculptures, which incorporate movement and interact with the environment. He owns the studio Gadi Fraiman Sculpture Garden - Art gallery in Mishmar David, Israel, where he displays his work.

== Life and career ==
Fraiman was born in Poland to parents Itzhak, a Holocaust survivor and Anna. He moved to Israel at age 8 with his family in 1966. In Kibbutz Mishmar David, he began working as a farmer during his early 20's.

Fraiman started carving stones in his free time using tools he found in a warehouse on the kibbutz in 1982. He decided to build a larger studio in 1995, located on the top of a hill in the outskirts of the kibbutz. He restored the building and displayed his work in the gallery he opened up there. In 2002, he established a school for sculpting in bronze and stone in his studio. As of 2018, he continues to create art in his studio in Mishmar David.

== Works ==
Fraiman's work is exhibited in several galleries. Apart from his bronze and colored artworks, Fraiman has series such as the Butterflies Series that include the pieces Momentum, Magic, The Butterfly Effect and Courtship. The butterflies in stone and bronze refer to the symbol of freedom. The Dance Series includes Ballet, Colored Dance, Dancer and Tango. His interest in movement resulted in his Dancing Sculptures, in which two dancers that create a new form together. The Mask Series in which two flowing, interconnected figures join to dance, include Games of Masks, Pretenders, Observers and Chess. In his Relationship Series sculptures, he reflects on the nature of human relationships. These include Relationship, Shadows, Evolution, Lovers, Dating Battle and Bonded, while the Bird Series includes Swan, Flamingo, Bird of Paradise and Black Swan.

Fraiman's work with metal includes Tango, Innocence, Balloon Girl series, Blossom Ball City of Bat Yam, Solar system Kiryat Bialik and Teva Square, Neot Hovav, Israel and his work with stone includes Gezer Calendar, Kansas, The Fallen Soldiers Elkana, Mushrooms and Gnomes, and Restoration of Ancient Coins.

=== Works ===
- 2023 - Flamingo, Public Monument, Nassau, Bahamas
- 2021 - Innocence, Monument, Bat Yam, Israel
- 2020 - Perspective Public Monument, Bat Yam, Israel
- 2019 - Blossom Ball, Public Monument, Bat Yam, Israel
- 2018 - Solar System Public Monument, Kiryat Motzkin city hall, Israel
- 2015 - Solar System monument, Ramat Hovav, Israel
- 2015 - The Band, Givaat Shmuel, Israel
- 2014 - The Church of God Monument, Horns of Hattin, Israel
- 2009 - Son's Inheritance monument, Elkana, Israel
- 2009 - Gezer ancient tablet reproduction, Leawood, Kansas, USA
- 2008 - TEVA Fountain, Beer Sheba, Israel
- 2006 - Dwarf Park Holon, Israel
- 2004 - Animals, The Biblical Zoo, Jerusalem, Israel
- 2001 - Creation, Beilinson Hospital, Israel
- 1999 - A Tribute to Yitzhak Rabin, Beilinson Hospital, Israel
- 1998 - Rotem Lookout, Jerusalem, Israel
- 1997 - The Stork's Visit, Shoham, Israel
- 1995 - Sculptors working in the street, Shoham, Israel
- 1992 - Hat Lady Ramat Hasharon, Israel
- 1991 - Lovers, Ganei Tikva concert hall, Israel
- 1990 - No Title Rishon Lezion, Israel

== Exhibitions ==
- 2018 - Solo Exhibition, Discount Bank, Tel Aviv, Israel
- 2016 - ‘Gadi Fraiman’ Gallery launce, Mishmar David, Israel
- 2014 - Bartoux Gallery, Cannes, France
- 2004 - Harvey Krueger's Sculpture Garden Dedication, New Jersey, USA
- 1993 - Solo exhibition, Migdal gallery, Tel Aviv, Israel
- 1992 - Sculpture Garden Dedication, Brogues, Belgium
