= Mark Pigott =

American businessman (born 1954)

- Born: Mark Charles Pigott; February 6, 1954 (age 72); San Francisco, California, US
- Education: Stanford University (BS, BA, MS)
- Occupation: Businessman
- Employer: Paccar (1978–present)
- Title: Chairman and CEO of Paccar (1997–2014); Executive chairman of Paccar (2014–present)
- Spouse: Cindy Piggot

Mark Charles Pigott (born February 6, 1954) is an American businessman and philanthropist. He has been executive chairman of Paccar since April 2014. He was previously chairman and chief executive officer (CEO) of Paccar from January 1997 to April 2014. Pigott has been listed in Forbes magazine, in their annual listing of the top ten CEOs in the country.

== Education ==
Pigott was born in San Francisco and raised in Seattle. He graduated from Stanford University receiving a Bachelor of Science in Industrial Engineering (1976), a Master of Science in Business (1984), and a Bachelor of Arts in Humanities (1998). He has received an Honorary Doctorate Doctor of Science from Trinity College, Dublin (2007), an Honorary Doctorate of Laws (LL.D.) from Gonzaga University (2008), an Honorary Doctorate of Humane Letters (D.H.L.) from Lehman College, NY (2010), an Honorary Doctorate of Fine Arts from the University of Puget Sound, WA (2014), an Honorary Doctorate of Humane Letters from the University of Washington, WA (2016), and an Honorary Doctorate from Washington State University, WA (2019).

== Business career ==
Mark Pigott's career with Paccar began in 1978. He is the fourth generation of the Pigott family to lead the company is a publicly traded company in the capital goods and financial services industries. PACCAR's major brands are DAF Trucks, Kenworth and Peterbilt trucks, PACCAR Financial, PacLease, PACCAR Parts, PACCAR Information Technology and PACCAR Powertrain.

During Pigott's tenure as chairman and CEO, Paccar has delivered a 1,700 percent total return to shareholders and received J.D. Power and Associates Awards for highest customer satisfaction as well as International Truck of the Year Awards.

Pigott has been Chairman of the DAF Supervisory Board since 1996, served on The Business Council (Washington, D.C.) (retired), and on the Washington State Business Roundtable Executive Committee (retired).

== Philanthropy ==
Mark Pigott is president of the PACCAR Foundation, which annually donates $5–$10 million in support of education, social services and the arts. Beneficiaries include University of North Texas (2006), Stanford University (2006), Mississippi State University (2007), Gonzaga University (2006), East Mississippi Community College (2007), University of Washington (2008), Seattle University (2009), University of Puget Sound (2013) and Washington State University (2014). Pigott established the PACCAR Award for Teaching Excellence at the University of Washington in 1997. This is the highest honorarium teaching award for MBA professors in the United States. In 2014, PACCAR was ranked fifth on a list of 25 top large corporate philanthropists in the state of Washington by the Puget Sound Business Journal Book of Lists.

On a personal basis, Pigott has funded professorships and scholarships at Stanford University, Gonzaga University, Cambridge University, and Trinity College, Dublin.

Pigott holds seats on the board of the Royal Shakespeare Company America, The British Library Foundation, St. George's Society (New York) Advisory Board, and Trinity College Foundation. He is a life member of the National Gallery London, The British Library, Royal Society for the encouragement of Arts, Manufacture Commerce (RSA), and the Royal National Theatre, UK. Major philanthropy activities of his include strategic planning and implementation of capital projects at St Paul's Cathedral, London. A bibliophile, Pigott is involved in numerous projects benefiting the British Library. He established the annual Pigott Poetry Prize in Ireland (2014). He has lectured at graduate schools of business, including the University of Washington, Seattle University and Cambridge University.

== Personal life ==
Pigott lives in Medina, Washington with his wife Cindy. He is a member of Augusta National Golf Club.

== Awards and honors ==
Mark Pigott has been awarded numerous honors, awards, and knighthoods over the course of his career. Notable awards include:

| Year | Award or Honor | Organization | Country |
|---|---|---|---|
| 2025 | Grand Officer of the Order of the Crown | Order of the Crown (Belgium) | Belgium |
| 2018 | Britannia BAFTA Humanitarian award | BAFTA Los Angeles | United States |
| 2016 | Knight of the Order of St. John | Venerable Order of Saint John | United States |
| 2014 | Chevalier of Orders and Letters | FrenchCulture.org | France |
| 2013 | Inducted into Industry Week's Manufacturing Hall of Fame | Industry Week | United States |
| 2012 | Honorary Knight Commander of the Most Excellent Order of the British Empire (KBE) | Order of the British Empire | United Kingdom |
| 2010 | Medal of Honor from the St George's Society of New York | St. George's Society of New York | United States |
| 2009 | Knights Cross of the Order of Merit | Republic of Hungary | Hungary |
| 2009 | Commander of the Order of St. John | Venerable Order of Saint John | United States |
| 2009 | Guild of Benefactors | Cambridge University | United Kingdom |
| 2008 | Officer of the Order of Orange-Nassau | Order of Orange-Nassau | Netherlands |
| 2007 | Stanford University Governors’ Award for over 30 years' of dedicated service to the University | Stanford University | United States |
| 2003 | Officer of the Order of the British Empire (OBE) | Order of the British Empire | United Kingdom |

== Other sources ==
- BusinessWeek – “Thinking Outside the Truck”
- PACCAR - The Pursuit of Quality, Alex Groner and Barry Provorse; Documentary Media, Seattle, Washington, 2005 – 4th Edition
- Kenworth Trucks: The First 75 Years, Doug Siefkes; Sasquatch Books, Printed in Canada, 1998
- PACCAR Inc Business Background Report, ChoiceLevel Books, Filiquarian Publishing, LLC / Qontro, June 12, 2009
