= PACCAR Columbus Plant =

- Built: 2009
- Operated: 2010–present
- Location: 1000 Paccar Drive; Columbus, Mississippi, United States
- Coordinates: 33.4779°N 88.5974°W
- Industry: Automotive
- Products: engines
- Employees: 650
- Area: 400 acres (160 ha)
- Volume: 420,000 square feet (39,000 m^{2})
- Owner: Paccar

PACCAR Columbus Plant is an engine manufacturing plant in Columbus, Mississippi, owned by Paccar.

== History ==
On July 17, 2007, PACCAR broke ground on its $400 million, 400,000-square-foot engine manufacturing and technology center on a 400-acre site in Columbus, Mississippi. Groundbreaking was hosted by PACCAR CEO Mark Pigott and Mississippi Governor Haley Barbour.

PACCAR finished its construction on its new engine plant in 2009 despite the 2008 global recession, and the $300 million plant was opened on September 15, 2010, with 25 MX-13 engines being produced per day. By the late 2010s, the plant scaled up its output to roughly 150–180 engines per day, employing a workforce of around 500 to 600 workers operating across multiple shifts.

In 2020, the factory celebrated its 10th anniversary, having produced over 250,000 heavy-duty MX-11 and MX-13 diesel engines for Kenworth and Peterbilt trucks. In 2023, PACCAR broke ground on a $209.4 million expansion project at the site. The expanded facility was opened in March 2026, creating roughly 100 new jobs in the Golden Triangle region.

== Products made ==
- PACCAR MX-13 (2010–present)
- PACCAR MX-11 (2016–present)
