= Paccar =

American commercial vehicles and heavy equipment manufacturing company

Paccar Inc.

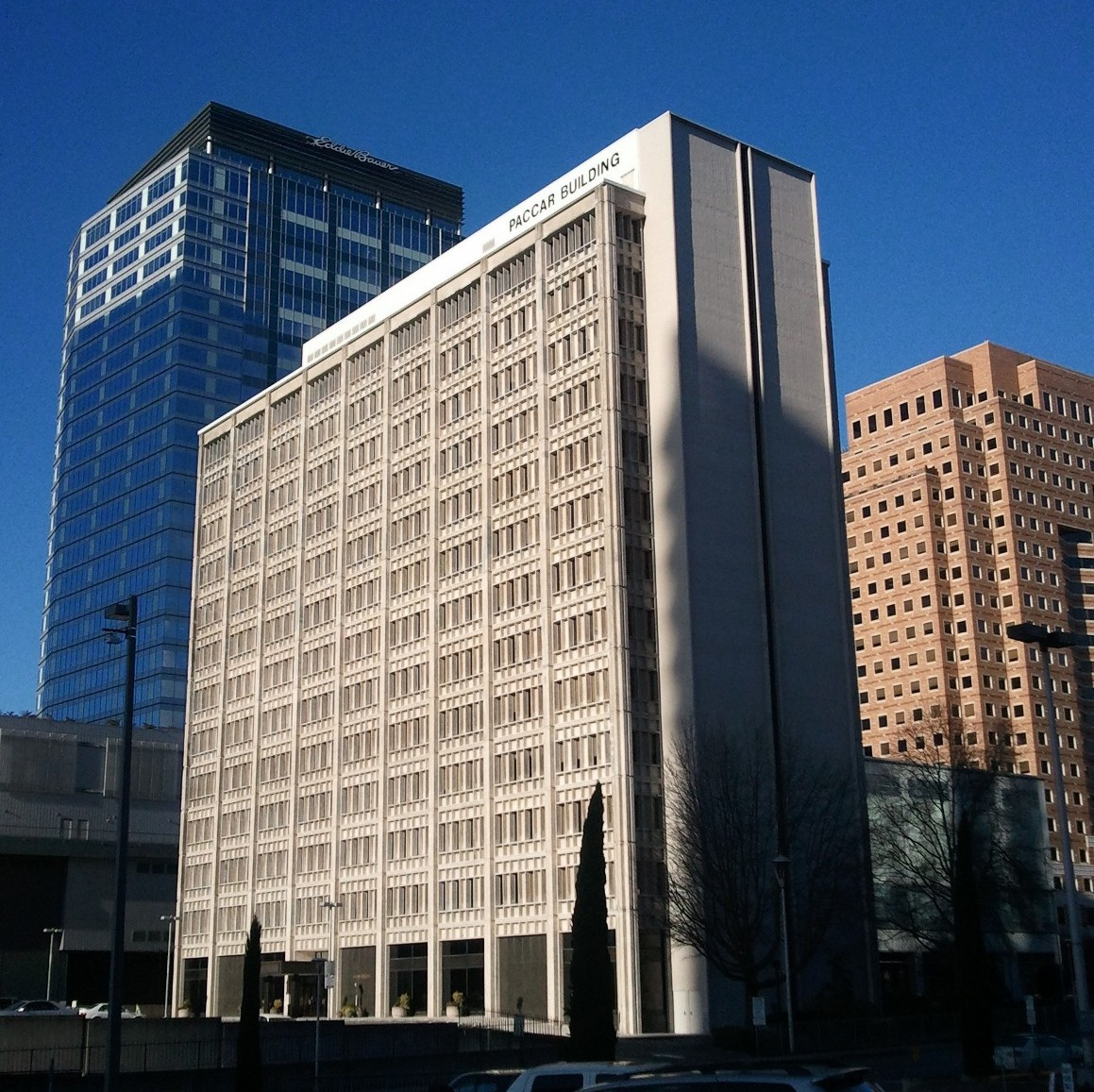
- The PACCAR Building, the company's headquarters in Bellevue, Washington, U.S.
- Type: Public
- Traded as: Nasdaq: PCAR; Nasdaq-100 component; S&P 500 component
- Industry: Heavy equipment; Automotive; Engines; Powertrain; Truck components; Financial services; Information technology
- Founded: 1905; 121 years ago
- Founder: William Pigott
- Headquarters: Bellevue, Washington, United States
- Area served: Worldwide
- Key people: Mark C. Pigott (chairman); Preston Feight (CEO)
- Products: Products List: Paccar MX13 & MX11; Paccar PR, GR & FR; Braden, Carco & Gearmatic; Tandem Axle; Class 6 Trucks; Class 7 Trucks; Class 8 Trucks
- Revenue: ▼US$26.2 billion (2025)
- Operating income: ▼US$2.32 billion (2025)
- Net income: ▼US$2.38 billion (2025)
- Total assets: ▲US$44.3 billion (2025)
- Total equity: ▲US$19.3 billion (2025)
- Number of employees: 25,900 (2025)
- Divisions: Kenworth; Peterbilt; DAF Trucks
- Subsidiaries: List: Transportation; Kenworth; Peterbilt; DAF Trucks; Tatra (19%); Leyland Trucks Financial services; Paccar Financial Corp.; PacLease Equipment; Winch; Braden; Carco; Germatic Aftermarket parts; Paccar Parts; Paccar Parts Europe; Paccar Parts South America International sales; Paccar Global Sales Information technology; Paccar ITD Truck components; Dynacraft Research and development; Paccar Technical Center; DAF Central Lab Engine manufacturing; Paccar Engine Company International; Paccar Australia; Kenworth Australia; DAF Trucks Australia; Paccar New Zealand; Southpac Trucks; ALL RIG Parts; Paccar Mexicana; Kenworth Mexicana; Peterbilt Mexicana; Paccar Canada; Kenworth Canada; Peterbilt Canada; Paccar India; Paccar China; Paccar Brazil; DAF Trucks Brazil
- Website: paccar.com

Paccar Inc. (stylized as PACCAR) is an American company that manufactures heavy-duty trucks. It operates subsidiaries including Kenworth, Peterbilt, and DAF Trucks. Headquartered in Bellevue, Washington, PACCAR also provides financial services and industrial parts. Its stock is listed on the Nasdaq and is part of the S&P 500 index.

== History ==
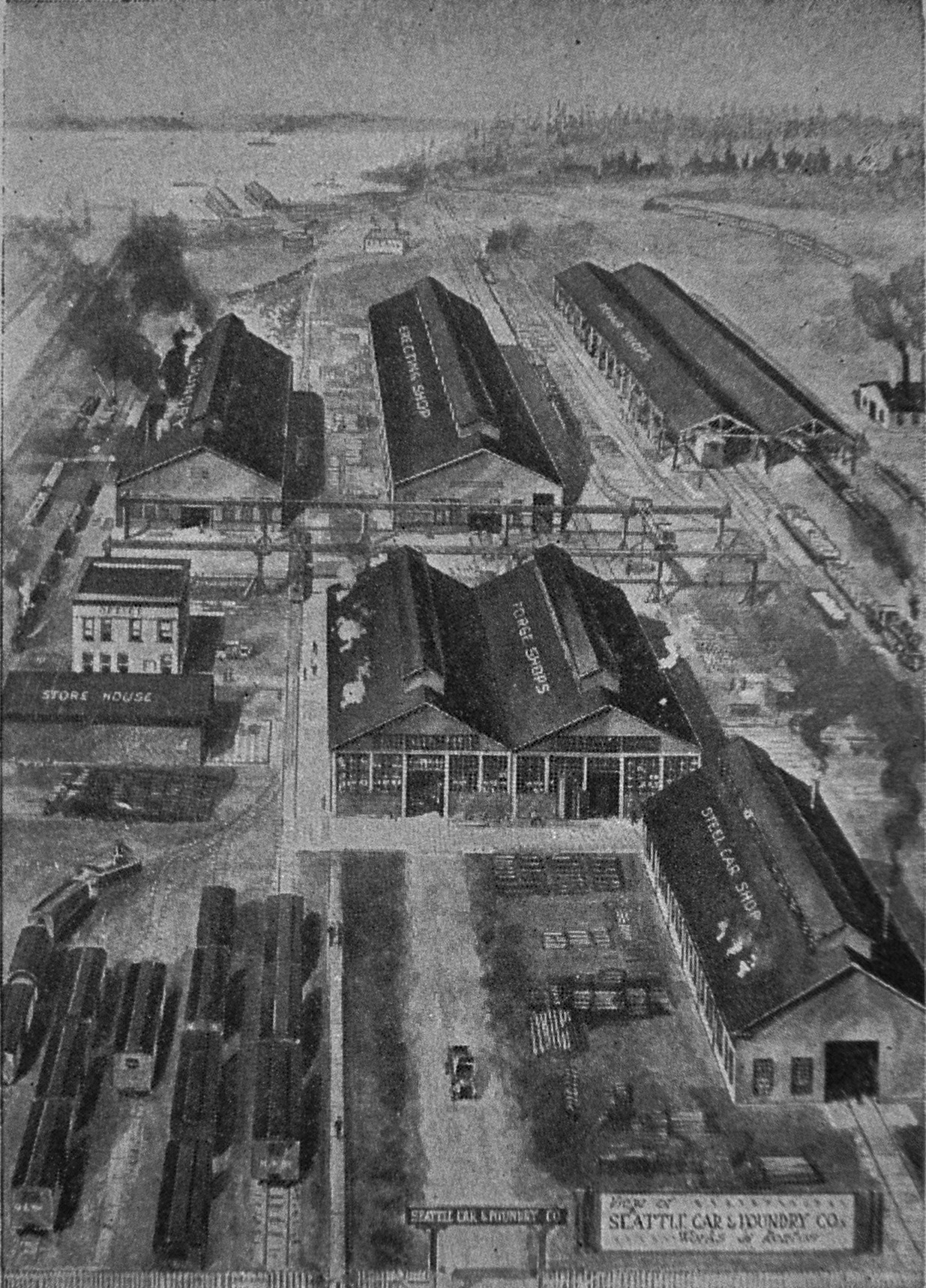
Seattle Car and Foundry works at Renton, Washington, 1916

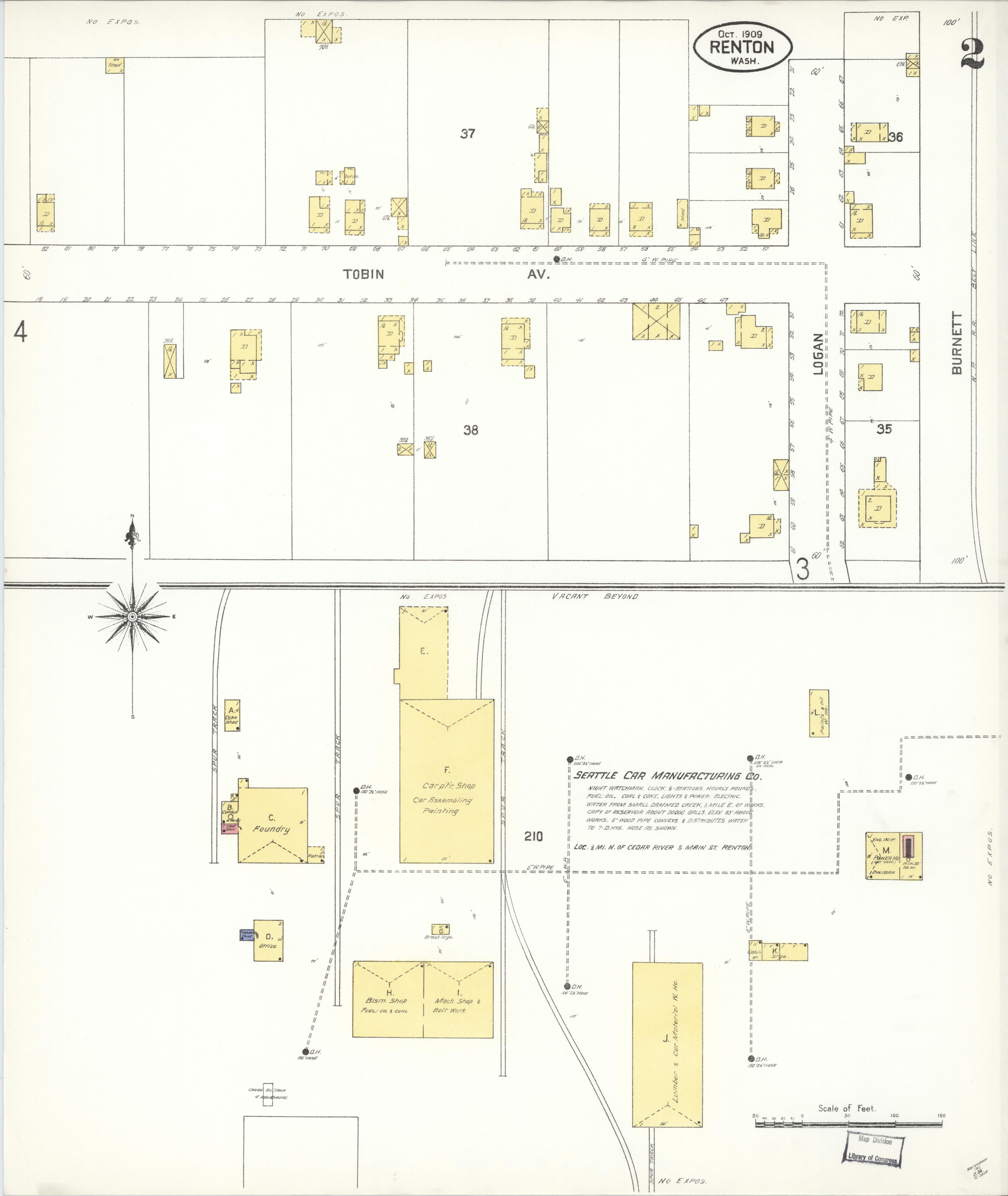
Seattle Car plant (1909)

The company was founded by William Pigott Sr. as Seattle Car Manufacturing Company in 1905, with a capitalization of $10,000. Its original business was the production of railway and logging equipment. The company built a new factory in Renton in 1909 after its Duwamish facility was destroyed in fire as well as to fulfill large number of orders.

In 1917 it merged with a Portland firm, Twohy Brothers, which was its only competitor on the west coast at the time and company was renamed as Pacific Car and Foundry Company. The company manufactured horse or oxen-drawn logging trucks built specifically to address the dense, hilly forests in which the Northwest logging industry operated to transport massive logs. The following years the company specialized in designing air brakes, open cars, refrigerated boxcars for shipment of perishable items and the universal trailer which could be pulled by a truck. The company also manufactured structural steel that was finished by hand that was used to create columns and girders that went into many Seattle-area buildings.

In 1924, the founder, William Pigott sold a controlling interest in the company to American Car and Foundry Company. However, his son, Paul Pigott reacquired a significant interest in the company from American Car and Foundry Company in 1934.

During the Great Depression in 1930 despite the stock market crash, the company's earnings rose; but as the Great Depression deepened, Pacific Car and Foundry became one of the most depressed businesses in the Northwest. During the late 1930s, Pacific Car and Foundry received government contracts for steel fabrication for construction of Lake Washington Floating Bridge (today the Lacey V. Murrow Bridge) as well as orders from other companies.

=== During World War II ===
During World War II, Pacific Car and Foundry's sales grew due to an increased demand for steel used in airplanes, airports, bridges, naval ships, highways and other equipment that helped build America's infrastructure to support the war effort. Pacific Car also sub-contracted for Boeing, building aluminum wing spars for B-17 bombers. During 1942 and 1943 the company also built M4A1 Sherman tanks for the U.S. Army. The company was able to cast almost all the parts for the tanks at its own foundry. Other notable vehicles that were built included the M25 tank transporter, known as the "Dragon Wagon," and the T28 super-heavy tank. Everett-Pacific Shipbuilding & Dry Dock Company was established in 1942 that built ships and other marine products for the US Navy in Port Gardner Bay in Everett. It was bought by Pacific Car and Foundry in 1944.

=== Post-war ===
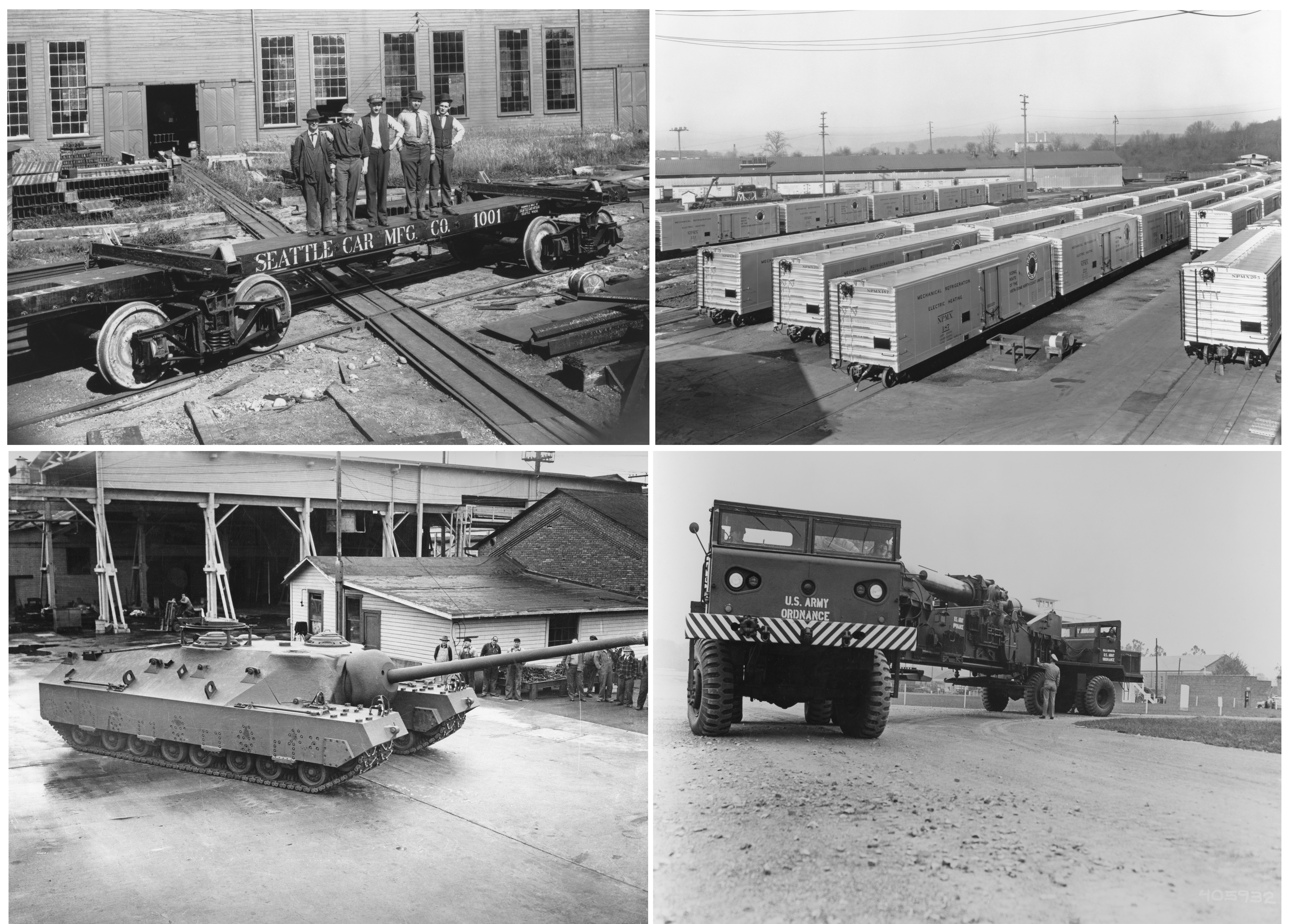
PACCAR's history in the 1900s. Clockwise from top: Seattle Car Mfg in 1909 with a skeleton log rail car, Pacific Car & Foundry yard with refrigerator rail cars in 1950, Kenworth tandem T-10 trucks hauling an atomic cannon, and the T28 super-heavy tank during WW 2

==== Kenworth ====
After World War II ended, Paccar was a part of the federal government's Mobilization Planning Program, which meant that it promised to devote 100 percent of its facilities to military production in the event of a national emergency. The company was a prime contractor during the Korean War for producing tanks. Pacific Car chose to subcontract many of the necessary parts, boosting smaller businesses in the state. In 1945 Paccar purchased the Kenworth Motor Truck Corporation. Named after founding stockholders Harry Kent and Edgar Worthington, Kenworth had been producing trucks in Seattle since it was incorporated in 1923.

During World War II, Kenworth produced trucks, airplane assemblies and sub-assemblies for the United States military. As the war drew to an end Kenworth shifted attention to production of commercial trucks for the postwar market. In 1956 Kenworth lost independent status and became a division directly under Pacific Car and Foundry.

==== Dart Truck and Peterbilt Motors ====
In 1954, Paccar acquired the Dart Truck Company and Peterbilt Motors Company. Dart specialized in heavy off‑highway dump trucks, while Peterbilt produced trucks and buses as a competitor to Kenworth. By 1960, Peterbilt became a division of the company.

==== Structural steel ====
Pacific Car's structural steel division made the steel used to build the 50-story Seattle-First National Bank headquarters and to build Seattle's Space Needle in 1961. The firm provided 5,668 steel panels, weighing 58,000 tons, which formed a major part of the load bearing walls for New York City's World Trade Center Twin Towers. The World Trade Center, like the Sea-First building, bore the building's load on the exterior walls rather than on an interior structural skeleton. The steel panels were shipped by rail from Seattle to New York City on more than 1,600 railcars. Pacific Car was the largest contractor of the 13 steel fabricators that provided steel for the World Trade Center towers.

=== The 1970s to 1990s ===
In 1970 Pacific Car created an overseas manufacturing facility at Bayswater, Melbourne, Australia, producing Kenworth Trucks to serve the growing developing local and Southeast Asian Markets, which still trade strongly today. The first completed locally built truck rolled off the production line in March 1971, and Australian made vehicle exports commenced in 1975. At the beginning of 1972, Pacific Car and Foundry, intending to exit steel manufacturing, introduced its current name, PACCAR.

Despite a serious slowdown due to recessions during 1974, PACCAR continued to generate increasing sales throughout the 1970s. PACCAR purchased Wagner Mining Company in 1975, which built underground Mining Vehicles, International Car Company in 1975 and Foden Trucks a British truck manufacturer in 1980. Fodens sold trucks in Europe and Africa.

Paccar International was formed in 1972 that promoted exports worldwide. Paccar Technical Center was established in 1980 in Mount Vernon, Washington, as a research and testing facility. The facility included test tracks, engine test cells, materials test laboratories and structural laboratories. The tech center conducts an Open House event every April that coincides with the Skagit Valley Tulip Festival.

In 1983 the International Car Co Division in Kenton, Ohio, which had been acquired on December 1, 1975, was disbanded. In 1983 the Paccar Rail Leasing Inc subsidiary in Renton, Washington, and the RAILEASE Inc subsidiary in Bellevue, Washington, were disbanded. In 1986 the Pacific Car and Foundry subsidiary in Renton was renamed to Paccar Defense Systems Division. In 1984, PACCAR posted record sales in its history of $2.25 billion.

In the mid-1980s, PACCAR share of Class 8 trucks dropped to about 18% owing to aggressive competition from Freightliner Trucks, which is a subsidiary of Daimler AG and the merged operations of Volvo, White, and General Motors. This competition forced PACCAR to close its Kenworth assembly plant in Kansas City in April, 1986 and its Peterbilt plant in Newark, California, the following October. PACCAR acquired Trico Industries in 1986 which was a manufacturer of oil exploration equipment based in Gardena, California, for $65 million in order to reduce its dependence on the Class 8 Truck market.

During the mid-80's PACCAR was negotiating with the Rover Group, for acquiring its British Leyland truck division. However, Rover management decided to sell the truck division to DAF Trucks, which was a Dutch automotive concern. PACCAR's Dart Truck Company and Wagner Mining Equipment Company were sold in 1984 and 1989 in order to remain profitable. In 1987, PACCAR entered the automotive parts and accessories retail market by acquiring Al's Auto Supply and Grand Auto Incorporated.

=== The 1990s and beyond ===
Paccar Parts was created in 1992 in Renton, Washington. The building it was housed in occupied part of the company's historic Pacific Car and Foundry site. In the same year, PACCAR purchased a 21 percent stake in Wood Group ESP which added to its oil field equipment manufacturing. In 1993, PACCAR acquired a line of winches from heavy equipment manufacturer Caterpillar. The same year it brought a new plant in Washington on line to help meet the increased demand for trucks. In 1994 the company began selling in New Zealand for the first time and entered new countries in Asia and Central and South America. The company made its Mexican joint venture VILPAC, S.A., a wholly owned subsidiary in 1995. PACCAR's Winch division was one of the world's largest manufacturer of industrial winches by 1994.

Paccar International sells trucks to more than 40 countries, becoming one of North America’s leading exporters of capital goods by 1995. The Kenworth truck plant opened in Renton, Washington, on June 4, 1993. Mark Pigott became president of PACCAR in 1997 after Charles Pigott retired. In 1996, PACCAR invested US$543 million to purchase DAF Trucks N.V., based in the Netherlands, after pursuing the acquisition since 1985. Funding was sourced through the sale of Trico Industries to EVI in 1997. PACCAR’s financial and leasing subsidiaries were also successful in the late 1990s.

In 1998, PACCAR purchased Leyland Trucks, based in the UK, known for producing light- to medium-duty trucks (6–44 metric tons). PACCAR is one of the largest manufacturers of heavy-duty trucks worldwide through its brand names Kenworth, Peterbilt, and DAF. Competitors include Daimler Trucks, Navistar, and Volvo.

=== 2000s ===
On September 15, 2010, PACCAR opened its new $300 million engine plant in Columbus, Mississippi, with 25 MX-13 engines being produced per day.

In December 2011, the organization Public Campaign criticized PACCAR for spending $760,000 on lobbying and not paying any taxes during the severe economic recession of 2008–2010, instead getting $112 million in tax rebates, despite making a profit of $465 million. in 2010 PACCAR introduced the MX-13, an 12.9 liter 6-cylinder turbo diesel that is offered in Kenworth and Peterbilt trucks and the MX-11 originally debuted in Europe for DAF Trucks including the CF and XF models and in 2016, for the first North America customer deliveries the MX-13 was available for the Kenworth T680 and Peterbilt models.

== Leadership ==
- William Pigott (1905–1937)
- Paul Pigott (1937–1961)
- Robert O'Brien (1961–1965)
- Charles Pigott (1965–1997)
- Mark Pigott (1997–2013)
- Ron Armstrong (2013–2019)
- Preston Feight (2019–present)

== Subsidiaries ==
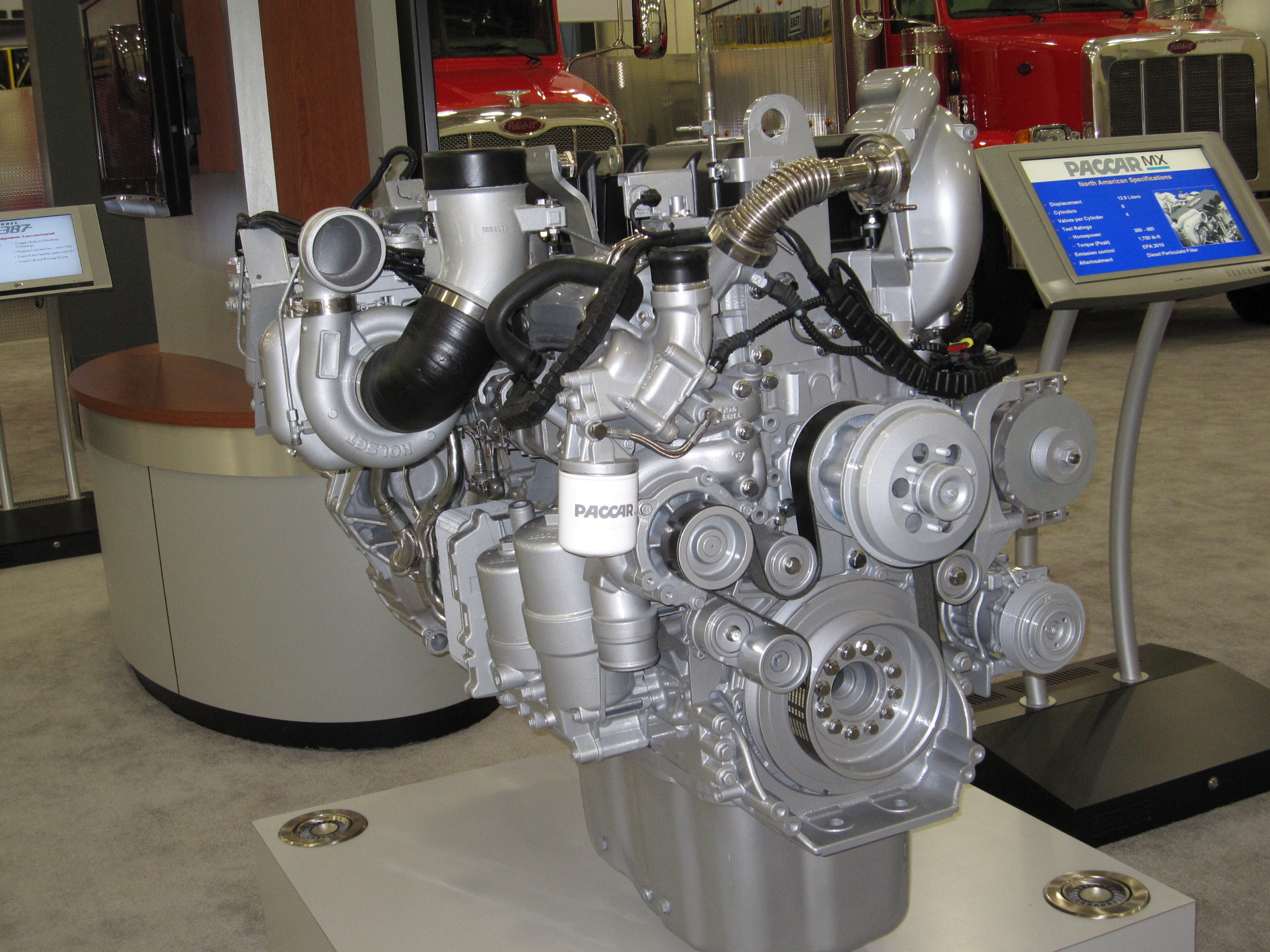
Paccar MX engine

- Peterbilt
- Kenworth
- DAF Trucks
- Leyland Trucks
- PacLease
- Paccar Parts
- Paccar Financial Corp
- Paccar Global Sales
- Paccar ITD (Information Technology Division)
- Dynacraft
- Paccar Technical Center

== Former subsidiaries ==
- Pacific Car and Foundry: Railroad freight cars and cabooses, and military vehicles manufactured at 1400 N 4th Street, Renton Washington.
- International Car Co Division: Railroad cabooses and freight cars manufactured at 31 Bales Road, Kenton Ohio.
- PACCAR Winch

== Sources ==
- David Wilma, Pacific Car and Foundry Co. becomes Paccar Inc on January 25, 1972, HistoryLink, April 11, 2001.
- Paccar – The Pursuit of Quality, Alex Groner and Barry Provorse; Documentary Media, Seattle, Washington, 2005 – 4th Edition
