= Leawood, Kansas =

- City
- Location within Johnson County and Kansas
- Interactive map of Leawood, Kansas
- Coordinates: 38°54′27″N 94°37′33″W
- Country: United States
- State: Kansas
- County: Johnson
- Founded: 1920s
- Incorporated: 1948
- Named for: Oscar Lee

Government
  - Mayor: Marc Elkins

Area
  - Total: 15.20 sq mi (39.38 km^{2})
  - Land: 15.10 sq mi (39.12 km^{2})
  - Water: 0.10 sq mi (0.26 km^{2})
- Elevation: 958 ft (292 m)

Population (2020)
  - Total: 33,902
  - Density: 2,245/sq mi (866.6/km^{2})
- Time zone: UTC−6 (CST)
  - Summer (DST): UTC−5 (CDT)
- ZIP Code: 66206, 66207, 66209, 66211, 66224
- Area code: 913
- FIPS code: 20-39075
- GNIS ID: 485611
- Website: leawood.org

Leawood (/ˈliːwʊd/) is a city in Johnson County, Kansas, United States, and is part of the Kansas City metropolitan area. As of the 2020 census, the population of the city was 33,902.

== History ==
=== 19th century ===
After the 1803 Louisiana Purchase, the area east of present-day Leawood opened for settlement. The Santa Fe Trail which ran through the area also contributed to the development of the area. The Border Ruffian War (1855–1857), part of a larger conflict known as Bleeding Kansas, damaged the local economy as pro-slavery activists from the slave state of Missouri attacked settlers, traders, and those traveling along the Santa Fe Trail. Conditions improved with the founding of Oxford, Kansas, the predecessor of Leawood. The township was destroyed by the American Civil War, and there was little left by 1865.

Leawood was named for Oscar G. Lee, the original land owner of the town site.

=== 20th century ===
Modern Leawood was established in the 1920s, after Oscar G. Lee, a retired police chief from Oklahoma, moved to Johnson County. He supervised the construction of Lee Boulevard for public use.

In 1948, a housing development by the Kroh Brothers led to the incorporation as a city. On November 30, 1948, Leawood became a city of the third class with a population of less than 2,000. By 1959, it had become a city of the second class. As of 2014, it is a city of the first class with approximately 32,800 residents. The 2020 Census shows population of 33,902.

As of 2015, it was one of the Kansas City metropolitan area's wealthiest suburbs, alongside Mission Hills, Kansas, and the Country Club Plaza. Particularly the neighborhoods of Hallbrook and Mission Hill Estates were all rated in the top 1%, according to a widely cited research professor.

== Covenants ==
The developers of Leawood, the Kroh Brothers (Clifford E. Kroh Jr., and brother John A. Kroh Sr.) and their father Clifford E. Kroh Sr., emulated Kansas City urban planner and real estate developer J. C. Nichols, if not competed and attempted to eclipse him. Nichols developed neighborhoods defined by "large lots, curvilinear streets, uniform architecture, extensive deed restrictions, and homes associations," according to "Race, Real Estate, And Uneven Development; The Kansas City Experience, 1900–2000" by Kevin Fox Gotham.

The Kroh Brothers for years used restrictive covenants for homeowners similar to those developed by J. C. Nichols, which have come under increasing scrutiny since the George Floyd Protests of 2020.

For example, on April 4, 1945, John A. Kroh Sr., filed the following language for a subdivision called Leawood Estates: "None of said lots or portions of lots shall ever be sold, conveyed, transferred, devised, leased or rented to or used, owned or occupied by any person of Negro blood or by any person who is more than one-fourth of the Semitic race, blood, origin, or extraction, including without limitation in said designation, Armenians, Jews, Hebrews, Turks, Persians, Syrians, and Arabians, excluding, however, from the application of this paragraph partial occupancy by bona fide domestic servants employed thereon."

The Kroh Brothers diversified into shopping malls and office buildings, and developed the original Ward Parkway Shopping Center. Their properties stretched across the country, with more than 100 developments in 13 states. The firm failed in a high-profile bankruptcy in 1987. Clifford Kroh's grandsons, John A. Kroh Jr. and George P. Kroh, both served time in prison for bank fraud and conspiracy.

== Geography ==
According to the United States Census Bureau, the city has a total area of 15.16 square miles (39.26 km^{2}), of which 15.06 square miles (39.01 km^{2}) is land and 0.10 square miles (0.26 km^{2}) is water.

The city is over 9 miles (14 km) north to south and about 2 miles (3.2 km) east to west. Its eastern border is with Kansas City, Missouri on the Kansas-Missouri state line, which includes eight different Kansas City neighborhoods. On its north and northwest, Leawood is bordered by Prairie Village, which is a similarly small suburb community. Its remaining western and southern boundaries is shared with Overland Park.

The city is split into four wards. and most of the city's neighborhoods have HOAs. The city's land area is approximately 75% developed and growth is expected to continue in the future.

== Demographics ==
Historical population
Census	Pop.	Note	%±
1950	1,167		—
1960	7,466		539.8%
1970	10,349		38.6%
1980	13,360		29.1%
1990	19,693		47.4%
2000	27,656		40.4%
2010	31,867		15.2%
2020	33,902		6.4%
2023 (est.)	33,980		0.2%
U.S. Decennial Census; 2010–2020

=== Racial and ethnic composition ===
Leawood city, Kansas – Racial and ethnic composition Note: the US Census treats Hispanic/Latino as an ethnic category. This table excludes Latinos from the racial categories and assigns them to a separate category. Hispanics/Latinos may be of any race.
Race / Ethnicity (NH = Non-Hispanic)	Pop 2000	Pop 2010	Pop 2020	% 2000	% 2010	% 2020
White alone (NH)	26,039	28,861	29,013	94.15%	90.57%	85.58%
Black or African American alone (NH)	401	603	502	1.45%	1.89%	1.48%
Native American or Alaska Native alone (NH)	36	37	41	0.13%	0.12%	0.12%
Asian alone (NH)	603	1,203	1,717	2.18%	3.78%	5.06%
Native Hawaiian or Pacific Islander alone (NH)	2	11	5	0.01%	0.03%	0.01%
Other race alone (NH)	26	48	109	0.09%	0.15%	0.32%
Mixed race or Multiracial (NH)	189	417	1,427	0.68%	1.31%	4.21%
Hispanic or Latino (any race)	360	687	1,088	1.30%	2.16%	3.21%
Total	27,656	31,867	33,902	100.00%	100.00%	100.00%

=== 2020 census ===
As of the 2020 census, Leawood had a population of 33,902 with 12,742 households and 9,974 families. The population density was 2,244.3 per square mile (866.5/km^{2}). There were 13,484 housing units at an average density of 892.6 per square mile (344.6/km^{2}); 5.5% were vacant.

The median age was 46.5 years; 24.0% were under the age of 18, 6.6% were from 18 to 24, 17.5% were from 25 to 44, 29.4% were from 45 to 64, and 22.4% were 65 years of age or older. For every 100 females there were 94.3 males, and for every 100 females age 18 and over there were 91.1 males age 18 and over.

Of the 12,742 households, 33.2% had children under the age of 18 living in them; 70.9% were married-couple households; 8.7% had a male householder with no spouse or partner present; and 17.8% had a female householder with no spouse or partner present. About 19.4% of all households were made up of individuals and 11.3% had someone living alone who was 65 years of age or older.

100.0% of residents lived in urban areas, while 0.0% lived in rural areas.

Racial composition as of the 2020 census
Race	Number	Percent
White	29,316	86.5%
Black or African American	512	1.5%
American Indian and Alaska Native	64	0.2%
Asian	1,724	5.1%
Native Hawaiian and Other Pacific Islander	7	0.0%
Some other race	227	0.7%
Two or more races	2,052	6.1%

Non-Hispanic whites comprised 85.58% of the population.

=== 2016–2020 American Community Survey ===
The 2016–2020 5-year American Community Survey estimated the average household size at 2.6 and the average family size at 3.0; 57.9% of residents had a bachelor's degree or higher.

The median household income was $156,538 (with a margin of error of +/- $9,441) and the median family income was $194,974 (+/- $22,055). Males had a median income of $116,151 (+/- $13,915) versus $46,187 (+/- $8,762) for females. The median income for those above 16 years old was $76,032 (+/- $4,591). Approximately, 1.0% of families and 1.4% of the population were below the poverty line, including 1.1% of those under the age of 18 and 1.8% of those ages 65 or over.

=== 2010 census ===
As of the census of 2010, there were 31,867 people, 11,781 households, and 9,367 families living in the city. The population density was 2,116.0 inhabitants per square mile (817.0/km^{2}). There were 12,384 housing units at an average density of 822.3 per square mile (317.5/km^{2}). The racial makeup of the city was 92.3% White, 1.9% African American, 0.1% Native American, 3.8% Asian, 0.4% from other races, and 1.4% from two or more races. Hispanic or Latino of any race were 2.2% of the population.

There were 11,781 households, of which 38.0% had children under the age of 18 living with them, 72.7% were married couples living together, 4.8% had a female householder with no husband present, 2.0% had a male householder with no wife present, and 20.5% were non-families. 18.1% of all households were made up of individuals, and 9.6% had someone living alone who was 65 years of age or older. The average household size was 2.70 and the average family size was 3.09.

The median age in the city was 44.7 years. 28.1% of residents were under the age of 18; 4.3% were between the ages of 18 and 24; 18% were from 25 to 44; 34.3% were from 45 to 64; and 15.3% were 65 years of age or older. The gender makeup of the city was 48.5% male and 51.5% female.

The city has become more Democratic in voting since 2016, going from majority conservative to a reliably swing district with near parity in party identification and fundraising. The city is evenly divided 50/50 Democratic-Republican.

=== Religion ===
Leawood is home to the main campus of the United Methodist Church of the Resurrection, which is the largest church in the Kansas City Metropolitan Area and the largest Methodist church in the country with 22,000 members and an average weekly attendance of 13,600. In 2017, one of the world's largest stained glass works, costing $3.4 million, was installed during the construction of the new sanctuary, depicting the arc of the Christian Biblical narrative, and features Jesus Christ in the center surrounded by historical figures.

Leawood is also home to three Catholic parishes: Church of the Nativity, Curé of Ars and St. Michael the Archangel.

== Economy ==
=== Top employers ===
According to Leawood's 2017 Comprehensive Annual Financial Report, the top employers in the city were:

#	Employer	# of Employees
1	AMC Theatres Support Center	450
2	Reece & Nichols	415
3	American Academy of Family Physicians	362
4	Blue Valley Unified School District	346
5	Select Quote	Less Than 50 (2024 Layoffs)
6	City of Leawood	256
7	Murphy-Hoffman Company	250
8	Nueterra Holdings Company	184
9	DEMDACO	150
10	Bukaty Companies	120

=== Shopping centers ===
Town Center Plaza is home to a number of upscale stores with few or no other locations in the Kansas City area.

== Government ==
=== Law enforcement ===
The Leawood Police Department is the main department in the city of Leawood, the Johnson County Sheriff's Office also assists as well. The Leawood Police Department was formed on January 18, 1949. The agency was formed when Robert E. Combs became the city's first chief of police. The first officers hired on were unpaid volunteers who wanted to help their community. By 1971 the city had gradually started paying patrol officers, and in 1986 the agency had reached 26 officers, 6 civilians and 1 dispatcher. Now the agency has around 60 officers. Currently the Leawood Police Department enrolls officers in the Johnson County Regional Police Academy who, following their graduation, join the agency, raising the number of officers hired. Leawood Police Officers have a dark navy blue uniform, dark blue pants, as well as black shoes or boots, and a badge with the department's insignia on it along with the Kansas state logo.

The Kansas Highway Patrol rarely patrols the city unless there is a major event. The Leawood police chief is Dale Finger, who has been chief since 2021.

== Education ==
=== Schools ===
Two public school districts serve Leawood -- Shawnee Mission School District and Blue Valley USD 229.

=== Libraries ===
The Johnson County Library serves the residents of Leawood.

In June 2014, Leawood city officials shut down a Little Free Library due to city ordinance prohibiting free-standing structures in the front yards of residential homes. The family of the nine-year-old boy who built the structure created a Facebook page to support amendment of Leawood's city code. Another resident of the city who erected a Little Free Library was threatened with a $25 fine. There are discussions among the city's residents in working with the city to amend its code regarding free-standing structures in residents' front yards.

== Notable people ==
Notable individuals who were born in and/or have lived in Leawood include Saturday Night Live comedian Heidi Gardner, co-founder of Garmin Corporation Min Kao, romance novelist Julie Garwood, U.S. Representative from Missouri Karen McCarthy, baseball pitcher Dan Quisenberry, founder of Hallmark Cards Joyce Clyde Hall, and tight end for Kansas City Chiefs Travis Kelce.

== Sister cities ==
- Yilan City, Taiwan (1988)
- Gezer Regional Council, Israel (2003)
