= Kenworth =

American truck manufacturer

Kenworth Truck Company
- Kenworth "KW" emblem and name badge
- Type: Division
- Industry: Manufacturing
- Predecessor: Gerlinger Manufacturing Company (1915), Gersix Motor Company (1917)
- Founded: 1923; 103 years ago in Seattle, Washington, U.S.
- Founders: Harry Kent; Edgar K. Worthington
- Headquarters: Kirkland, Washington, U.S.
- Key people: Jim Walenczak (General Manager and PACCAR vice president)
- Products: See listing
- Parent: PACCAR
- Website: www.kenworth.com

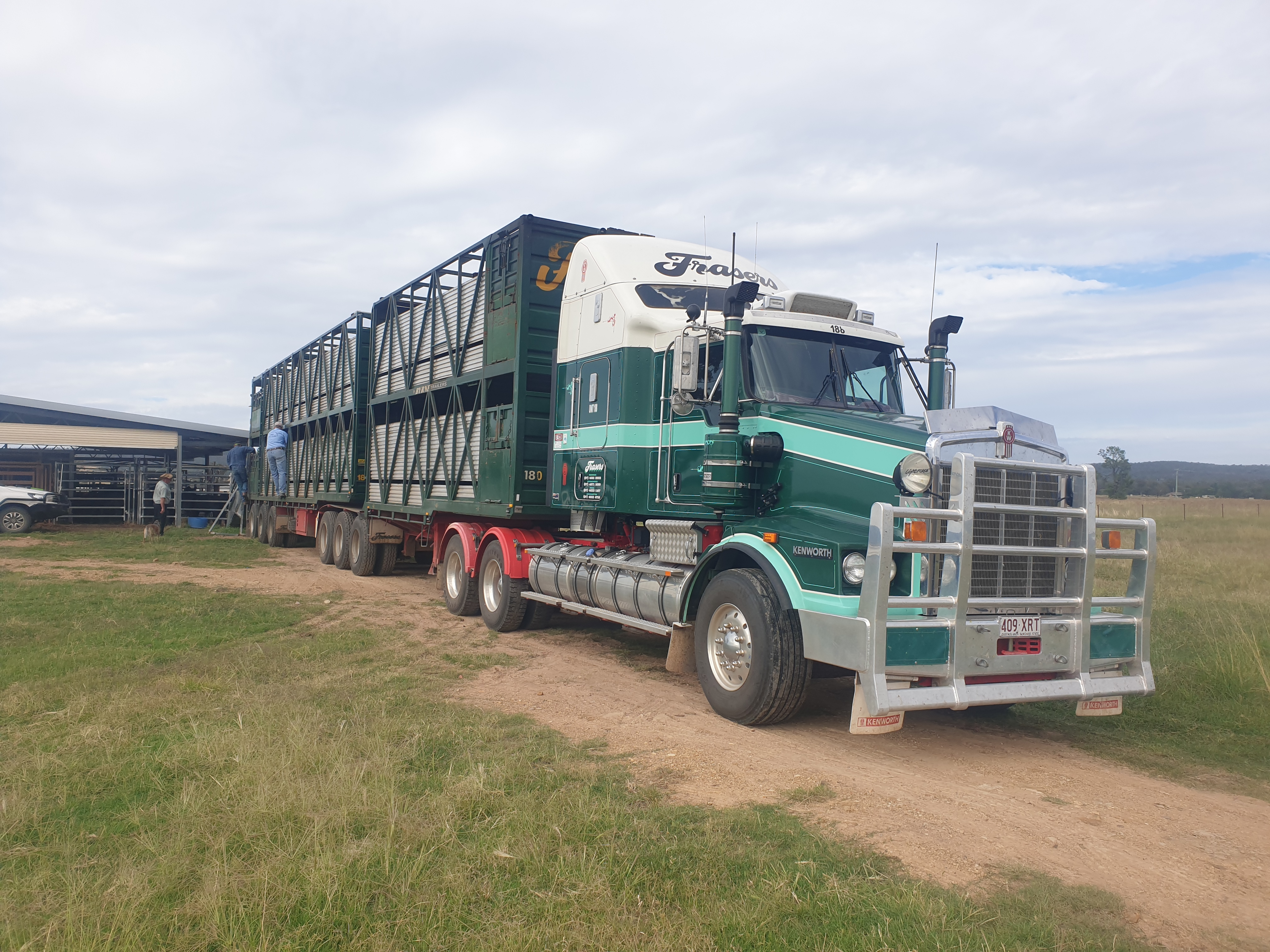
An Australian Kenworth T659 unloading cattle

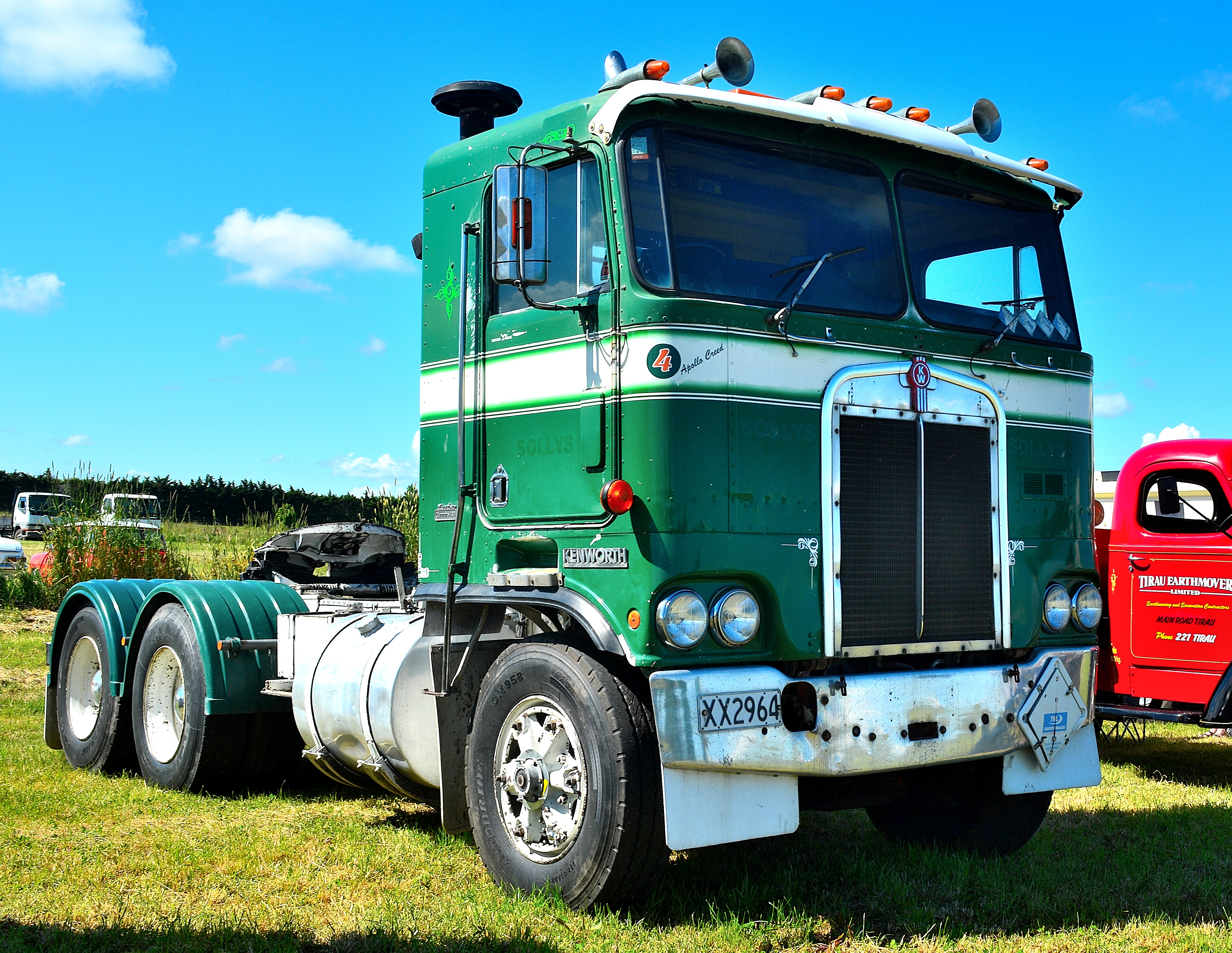
A 1985 Kenworth K 124CR

Kenworth Truck Company is an American truck manufacturer. Founded in 1923 as the successor to Gersix Motor Company, Kenworth specializes in production of heavy-duty (Class 8) and medium-duty (Class 5–7) commercial vehicles. Headquartered in the Seattle suburb of Kirkland, Washington, Kenworth has been a wholly owned subsidiary of PACCAR since 1945, operating alongside sister company (and marketplace rival) Peterbilt Motors.

Kenworth marked several firsts in truck production; the company introduced a raised-roof sleeper cab, and the first heavy-duty truck with an aerodynamically optimized body design. The Kenworth W900 has been produced continuously since 1961, serving as one of the longest production runs of any vehicle in automotive history. The K100 was also released in 1961.

== History ==
=== 1912-1923: Gerlinger Motors ===
Kenworth traces its roots to the 1912 founding of Gerlinger Motors in Portland, Oregon; the company was a car and truck dealership owned by brothers George T. Gerlinger and Louis Gerlinger, Jr. In 1914, the brothers expanded into vehicle manufacturing, marketing a truck named the Gersix. Deriving its name from its inline six-cylinder engine (one of the first trucks equipped with the type), the Gersix was framed in structural steel, intended for commercial use.

While the first vehicle was completed largely as a side project, the heavy-duty construction of the Gersix found itself in demand by loggers in the Northwest. In 1916, Gerlinger Motors relocated from Portland to Tacoma, Washington, leasing a building from Seattle businessman Edgar K. Worthington.

In 1917, Gerlinger Motors filed for bankruptcy and was put up for sale, with E.K. Worthington acquiring the company with business partner Captain Frederick Kent. To emphasize its connection to truck manufacturing, the company was renamed Gersix Motor Company. In 1919, Captain Kent retired, with his son Harry Kent replacing him as partner in the company.

In 1922, Gersix produced 53 trucks in its final year located at its factory on Fairview Avenue at Valley Street. Following continued strong demand of the model line, the company found itself with $60,000 to reincorporate and relocate its headquarters.

=== 1923-1930s: Kenworth Motor Truck Company ===
In January 1923, Gersix Motor Company was reincorporated as the Kenworth Motor Truck Company, combining the names of partners Kent and Worthington. Under the new name, the company relocated within Seattle to 506 Mercer Street, and later to 1263 Mercer Street. In contrast to car manufacturers, Kenworth abstained from assembly lines, instead constructing vehicles in individual bays. The company also introduced a practice of building vehicles to customer specification (a practice still offered by Kenworth today).

In 1926, Kenworth expanded its product line, introducing its first bus. In 1927, production was increased from two vehicles a week to three; the same year, manufacturing began in Canada (to avoid import taxes).

In 1929, E.K. Worthington retired, with Harry Kent becoming company president. In another change, to accommodate increased demand, Kenworth relocated to a larger factory within Seattle.

The onset of the Great Depression hit the company hard; initially in good financial health, a substantial decline in new vehicles and a high rate of vehicle loan defaults forced the company to adapt. In 1932, Kenworth produced its first fire truck; adapted from its commercial truck, Kenworth fire engines were among the heaviest-duty fire apparatus of the time.

In 1933, diesel engines became standard equipment, replacing gasoline engines entirely; at the time, diesel fuel cost 1/3 the price of gasoline. In another design innovation, Kenworth introduced the first factory-produced sleeper cab.

In 1935, the Motor Carrier Act was passed, introducing new size and weight regulations for the trucking industry in the United States; to comply with the legislation, Kenworth underwent an extensive redesign of its truck line. To match weight regulations, the new trucks received aluminum cabs and axle hubs; four-spring suspension was introduced, with torsion bars for the rear axles. In 1936, Kenworth introduced the Model 516, its first cabover (COE) truck; the tandem-axle 346 was introduced for 1937. In 1937, Harry Kent died, with Philip Johnson becoming company president.

=== 1940s: War production and company sale ===
In 1939, Kenworth introduced its 500-series trucks, which would form the basis of its commercial truck line into the mid-1950s. By the end of the 1930s, demand for trucks began to recover, with Kenworth producing 226 trucks in 1940.

Following the onset of World War II, Kenworth converted to war production, supplying the Army with 4-ton 6x6 M-1 recovery vehicles. In 1943, the company became a supplier for Boeing, manufacturing components for the B–17 and B– 29 bombers. To maintain its government contracts, Kenworth commenced production of the M-1 wrecker at a temporary facility in Yakima, Washington. In total, the company would supply the Army with 1,930 wreckers by the end of World War II; to accommodate the extensive increase in production, Kenworth introduced an assembly line to produce the vehicle.

In 1944, company president Phil Johnson died, leaving ownership split between his wife, Harry Kent’s widow, and another company director. Uninterested in owning the company, all three initially planned to offer their ownership to company employees, but financing for the offer was never completed. In 1945, Pacific Car and Foundry Company purchased Kenworth as a wholly owned subsidiary. By the end of 1946, Kenworth relocated again in Seattle, following the purchase of a former Fisher Body factory by Pacific Car and Foundry; this would house all Kenworth manufacturing under a single roof.

In 1948, Kenworth redesigned the cab of its COE product line, later nicknamed the "Bull-nose" 500-series.

=== 1950s: Market expansion ===
By 1950, Kenworth had grown outside the Pacific Northwest, marketing vehicles across the western half of the United States and across nearly 30 countries worldwide. In 1951, the company received an order for 1,700 Model 853s from ARAMCO in the Middle East. The Model 801 was introduced as an earth-moving dump truck, adopting one of the first cab-beside-engine configurations.

In 1955, Kenworth began the redesign of its COE product line, launching the CSE (Cab-Surrounding-Engine); in line with the Bull-nose, the CSE shared its underpinnings with the 500-series trucks and did not have a tilting cab.

In 1956, Pacific Car and Foundry revised its ownership of Kenworth, changing it from an independent subsidiary to a division. The same year, the 900-series was introduced with an all-new "drop-frame" chassis, with the CSE cabover replaced by the K-series COE (derived from the 900 series). In 1957, Kenworth ended bus production, selling the rights to its product line (see below).

In 1958, Kenworth became a sister company to Peterbilt, as the latter company was acquired by Pacific Car and Foundry. In 1959, the company further expanded its sales base, establishing facilities in Mexico.

=== 1960s: W900 and K100 ===
For 1961 production, Kenworth underwent a substantial revision of its commercial truck line, debuting the W900 and the K900 (later renamed the K100); the W and K model prefixes are derived from company founders Worthington and Kent. The W900 debuted the first complete redesign of the Kenworth conventional cab since 1939 with a standard tilting hood. Similar in appearance to the previous K500, the K900/K100 received a taller cab and the doors of the W900.

To meet increased demand for the new product lines, Kenworth opened a new assembly facility in Kansas City, Missouri, in 1964. From 1964 to 1966, Kenworth nearly doubled its yearly truck sales. In 1968, the company established Kenworth Australia; in place of importation and conversion, right-hand drive trucks were produced and developed in Melbourne, Australia.

=== 1970s: Product line diversification ===
During the 1970s, the company underwent further expansion, adding an all-new facility in Chillicothe, Ohio, in 1974. The W900 and K100 underwent their most substantial revisions, becoming the W900A and K100C. Kenworth added two new product lines in 1972, adding the C500 6x6 severe-service conventional and the Hustler low-cab COE (developed jointly with Peterbilt and produced in Canada). The same year, parent company Pacific Car and Foundry adopted its current name PACCAR.

Coinciding with the 50th anniversary of the company, annual Kenworth sales exceeded 10,000 for the first time for 1973.

For 1976, Kenworth launched a flagship customization series, the VIT (Very Important Trucker) with a high level of interior features; distinguished by its skylight windows, the Aerodyne sleeper cab was the first factory-produced sleeper cab with stand-up headroom (for both the W900 and K100). To commemorate the American Bicentennial, the VIT series was introduced in a limited-edition series of 50 (with each truck named after a state).

=== 1980s-1990s ===
In 1982 and 1984, respectively, the W900 and K100 underwent their most substantial revisions, becoming the W900B and K100E. While visually distinguished by the adoption of rectangular headlamps, the updates were centered around upgrading fuel economy, road handling, and reliability.

In 1985, the Kenworth T600 was released by the company; in contrast to the W900, the T600 was designed with a set-back front axle and a sloped hoodline. While the latter initially proved controversial, the combination improved aerodynamics, fuel efficiency, and maneuverability. Intended as an expansion of the Kenworth model line, the success of the T600 would lead to the introductions of similar designs from multiple American truck manufacturers. In 1986, the T800 was introduced, adapting the sloped hoodline and set-back front axle for a heavy-duty chassis; the shorter-hood T400 was introduced in 1988 as a regional-haul tractor.

In 1987, Kenworth introduced the Mid-Ranger COE, its first medium-duty truck. Shared with Peterbilt, the Brazilian-produced Mid-Ranger was derived from the MAN G90 (a wide-body version of the Volkswagen LT). In 1992, the Mid-Ranger became the K300, as PACCAR shifted production to Sainte-Thérèse, Quebec.

In 1993, Kenworth opened its facility in Renton, Washington, as its third United States assembly plant.

In 1994, the T300 was introduced as the first Kenworth medium-duty conventional truck, adapting the T600 to a lower-GVWR Class 7 weight rating. The Aerocab sleeper was introduced, integrating the Aerodyne II sleeper cab and the drivers' cab as a single unit.

In 1996, Kenworth introduced the T2000 as its next-generation aerodynamic conventional. While not directly replacing the T600 and W900, the T2000 was a completely new design (the first from Kenworth since 1961). The first "wide-body" Kenworth conventional, the model shared its cab with Peterbilt, distinguished by its bumper-mounted headlamps. The T2000 was discontinued in 2010.

In 1998, parent company PACCAR purchased British truck manufacturer Leyland Trucks, two years after Dutch manufacturer DAF Trucks (the two had been merged as Leyland DAF from 1987 to 1993). Within PACCAR, DAF would develop COE trucks for Kenworth and Peterbilt.

=== 2000s-present: 21st-century trucks ===
In 2000, Kenworth redesigned its medium-duty COE range, with the K300 replacing the MAN-sourced design with a DAF 45 (Leyland Roadrunner) cab. Following declining demand for Class 8 cabovers, the K100E was quietly phased out after 2002 production in North America; Kenworth Australia continuing production of the model line.

In 2006, the company released the K500, the largest COE ever produced by the company. Developed primarily for off-highway applications, the K500 combined the chassis of the heavy-duty C500 and the COE cab of the DAF XF; all examples produced from 2006 to 2020 were sold for export.

In 2008, Kenworth underwent a modernization of its model line. The T600 underwent a substantial revision to its aerodynamics, becoming the T660. The medium-duty T300 was replaced by the Class 5-7 T170/T270/T370 model family. The low-cab COE made its return, based on the DAF LF. Initially marketed as the K260/K360, the model line was renamed the K270/K370 for 2013. The T660 would be discontinued in 2017.

For 2011 production, the T700 replaced the T2000, adopting a larger grille and fender-mounted headlamps. For 2013 production, the T680 was introduced as the third-generation aerodynamic Kenworth conventional, serving as a single replacement for the narrow-body T660 and the wide-body T700. The T700 was discontinued in 2014 while the T660 was discontinued in 2017 (32 years after the introduction of the T600). Sharing the same cab as the T680, the T880 was introduced as the first wide-body Kenworth for vocational applications, alongside the W900S and the T800 model family.

In 2018, the W990 was introduced as the flagship conventional of the Kenworth model line. Sharing the wide-body cab of the T680 and T880, the W990 is the longest-hood conventional ever produced by Kenworth. As of current production, the W900 remains part of the Kenworth model line (six decades after its introduction).

For 2021 production, Kenworth introduced three model lines of electric vehicles, with the K270E, K370E, and T680E powered by battery-electric powertrains. In 2021, Kenworth launched the T680 FCEV with a 10 vehicle demonstration fleet in California. The T680 FCEV is powered with a Toyota hydrogen fuel cell, has six hydrogen tanks and a driving range over 300 miles (480 km) at a full load weight of 80,000 pounds (36,000 kg).

In 2022, Kenworth announced a new T680. The T680 Next-Gen was redesigned with the future in mind. The new Next-Gen model has a skinnier, but taller grill than the original T680. It has a completely all-new front bumper. Like the 579 Next-Gen (See Peterbilt), it has an all-new interior and steering wheel.

== Current models ==
=== Current products ===
==== United States/Canada/Mexico ====
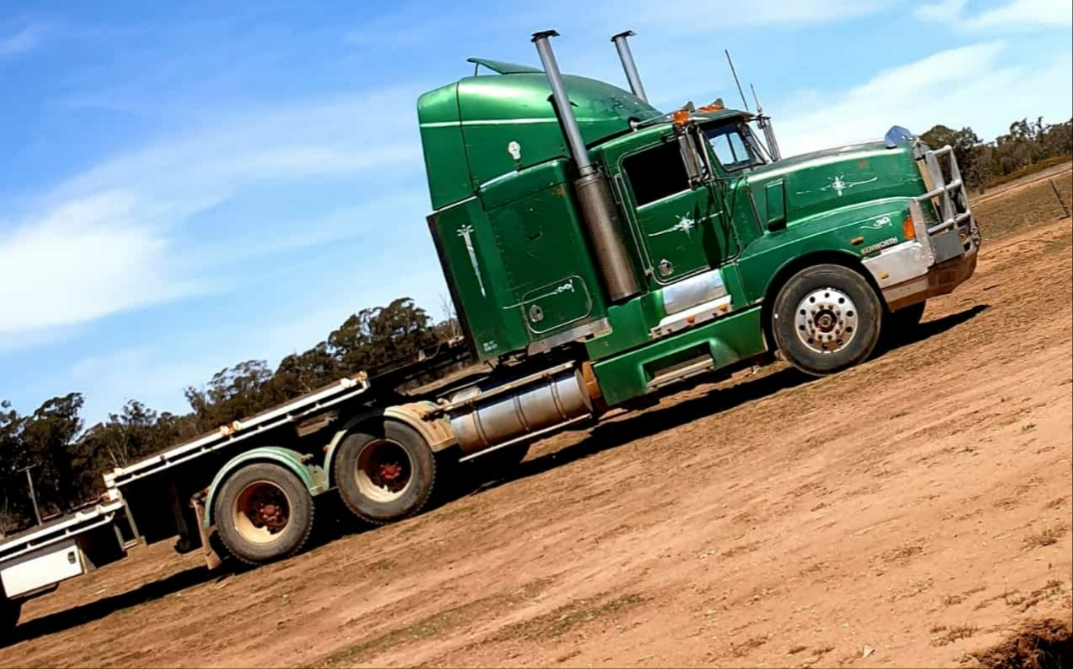
Kenworth T600

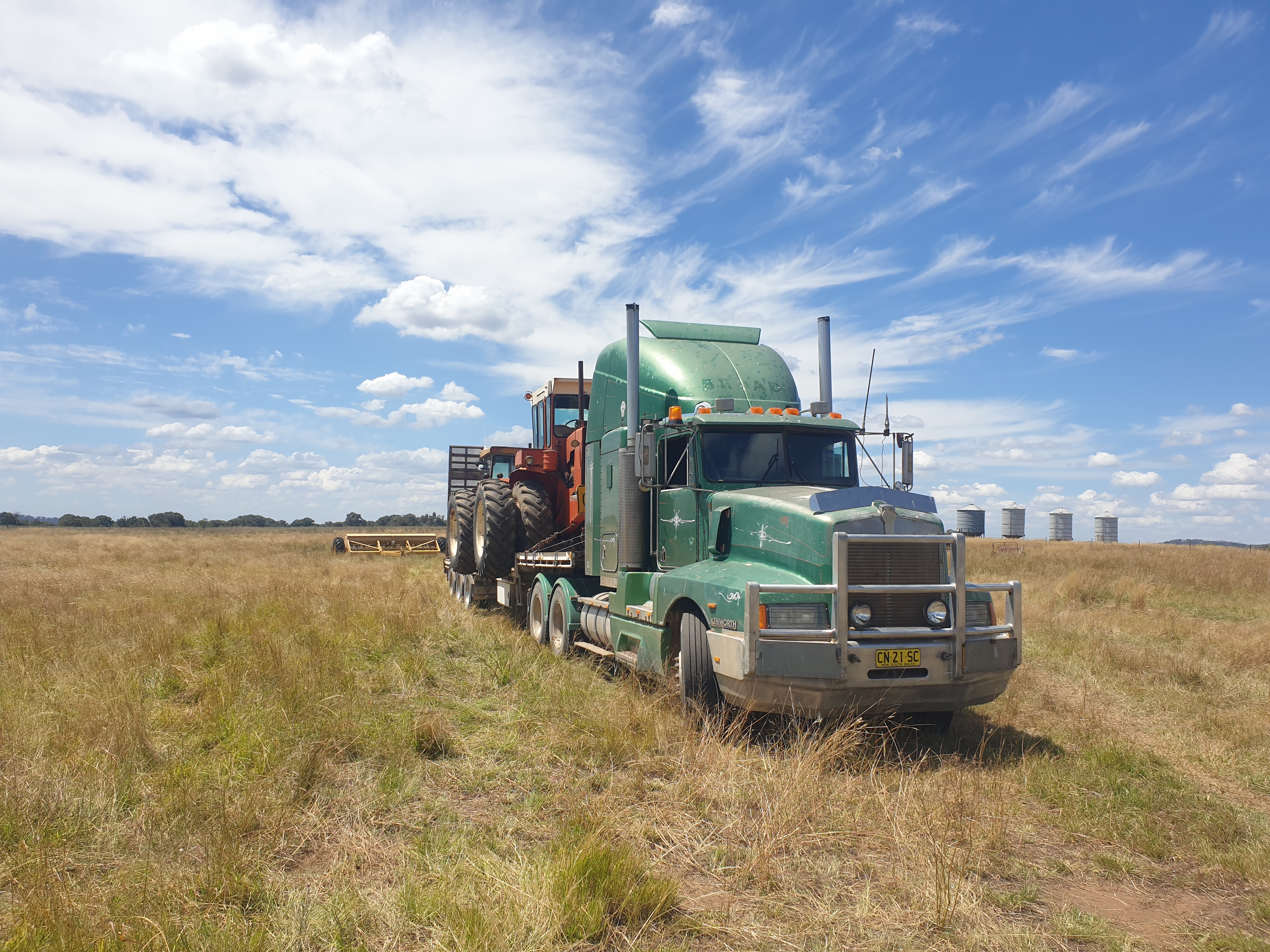
Kenworth T600

As of current production, Kenworth offers the following vehicles in North America.

- C500 (1972–present)
- K270/K370 (2013–present)
- T170/T270/T370 (2008–present)
- T440 (2011–present)
- T470 (2010–present)
- T680 (2013–present)
- T800 (1986–present)
- T880 (2014–present)
- W900 (1961–present)
  - Kenworth has built more than 280,000 W900s since 1963.
- W990 (2018–present)

==== Australia ====
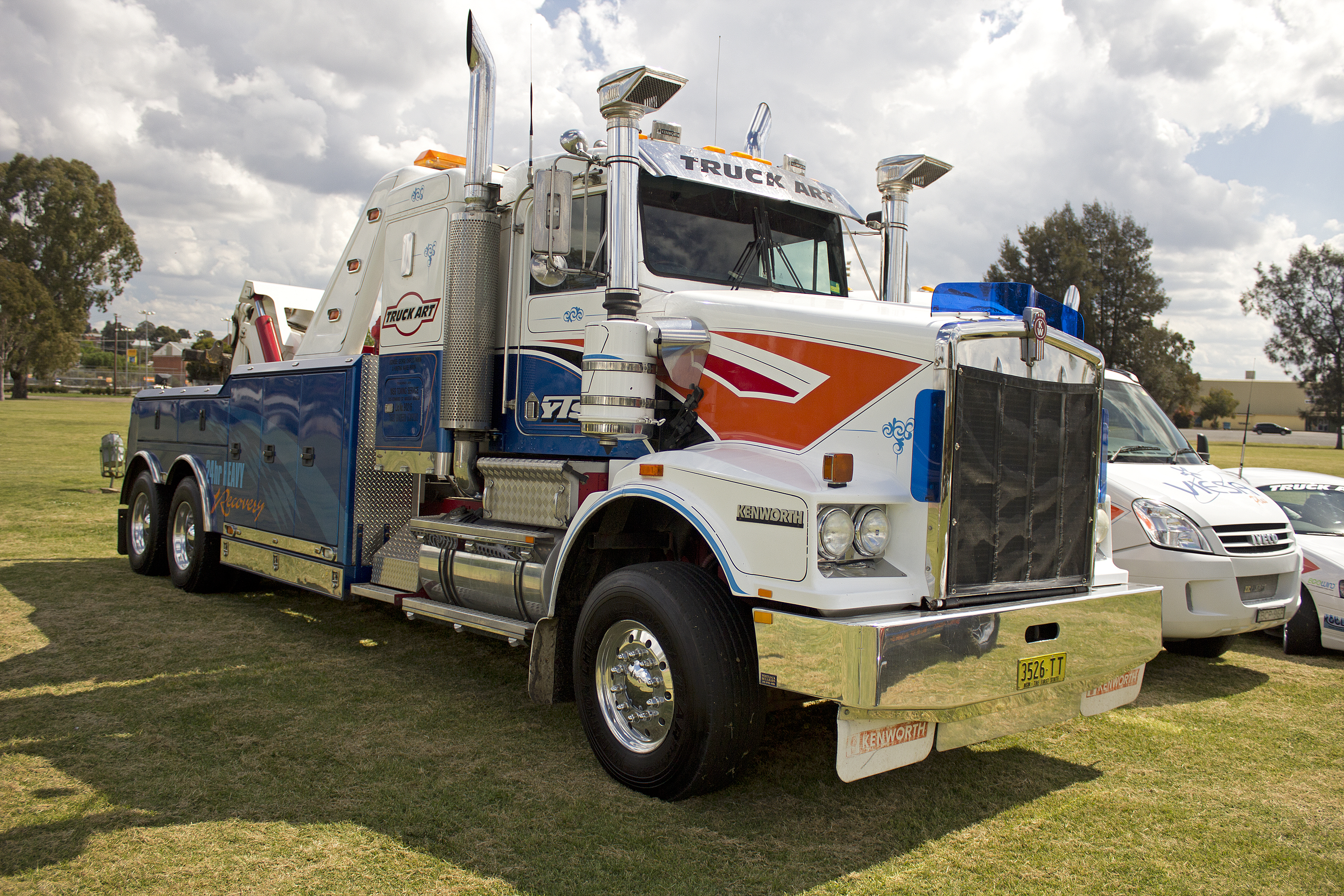
Kenworth T650, used as a heavy vehicle tow truck

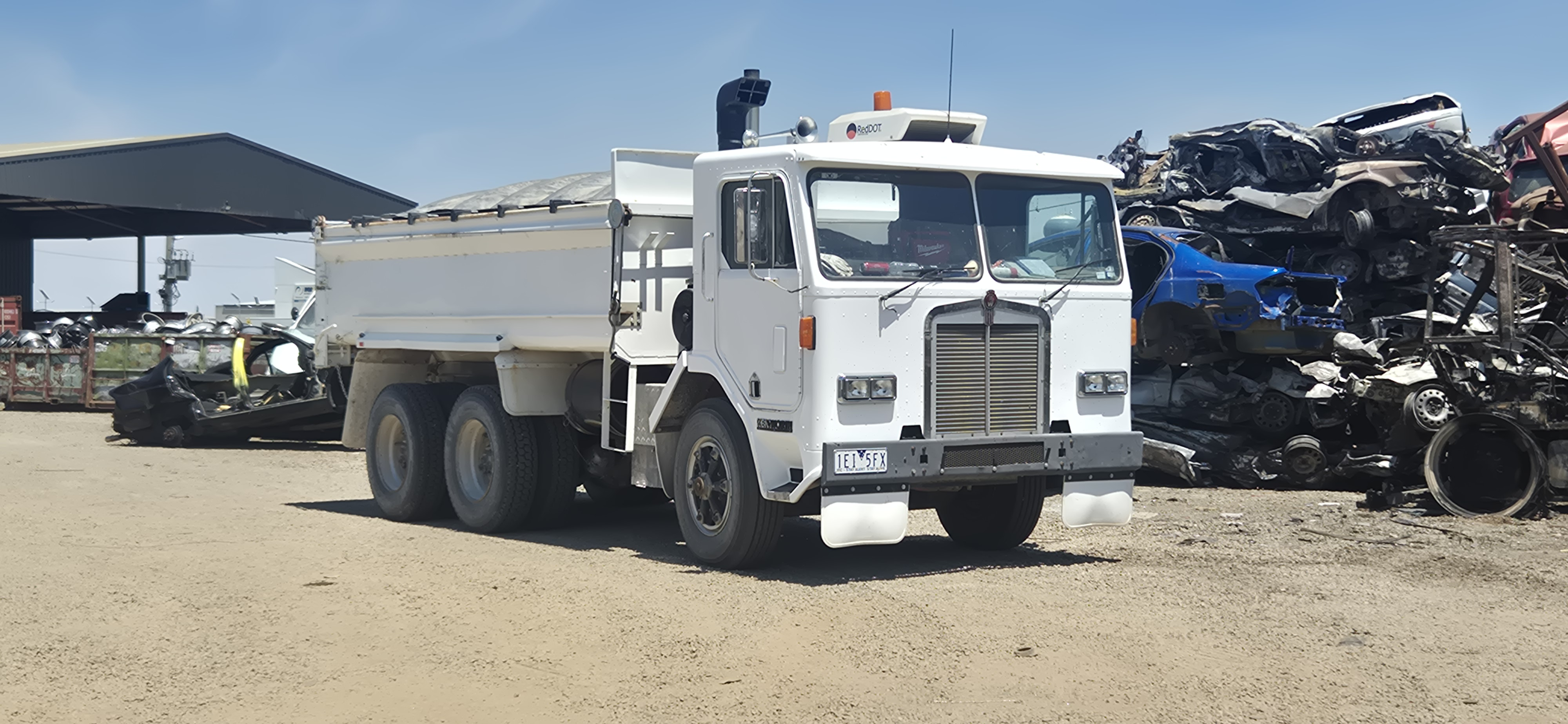
1988 Kenworth L700 Tipper seen in Australia

The headquarters for Kenworth Australia is located in Bayswater, Victoria where all Australian models are assembled. The first Kenworth model in Australia was the KWS925, imported fully built in 1962. Soon later, Kenworths were imported in complete knock-down kits and assembled in Preston, Victoria. Australian built Kenworth models are also exported to nearby RHD markets in New Zealand, Japan, Thailand and Papua New Guinea.

The T range includes the bonneted conventional models and the C for heavy haulage, mining, off-road and road train use, and the K range covers the cab over models. As of July 2020 the only models that do not have Twin-Steer configurations are T410 SAR, T610 SAR, T900, C510, C540.

Kenworth Australia started building the new range of trucks tying in their 2008 release with the model range being the '08 Series'. This includes the following conventional (bonneted) models; in approximate order of smallest to largest: the T358/A, T408SAR, T408, T608, T658, T908 and C508. The only cab over truck built was the K108, which was very popular in the B-Double market segment owing to its shorter length.

===== Legend Series =====
The Kenworth "Legend" Series is a limited production truck based on a previous models styling with modern improvements such as safety and environmental. Originally commencing in 2015 with the Kenworth T950 Legend, inspired by the Kenworth T950 that was in production from 1992 - 2007. This model of Kenworth Legend had 75 produced and sold out in 48 hours. The T950 Legend also came with a special edition Cummins ISXe5 engine which was painted in Cummins Heritage Beige.

2017 Saw the second truck in the Kenworth Legend Series released, that being the Kenworth T900 Legend inspired by the 1991 Kenworth T900. There were 257 Kenworth T900 Legends produced, The T900 Legend came with a special edition Cummins X15 painted in black and red to commemorate the Cummins N14 that many of the original T900 came with.

In 2021 the third truck in the Kenworth Legend Series was released this being the SAR Legend, a homage to the W900 SAR that was produced from 1975 until 1987. The SAR Legend has sales orders of over 700, a final number currently has not been released. The special edition Cummins X15 in the Kenworth SAR Legend is painted in Cummins Heritage Beige, similar to the Cummins Big Cam which were in many of the original Kenworth SARs.

Previous Australian Kenworth models include:

- T300 Series: T300, T350, T358, T359, T388
- T400 Series: T400, T401, T401 ST, T402, T403, T404/SAR, T408/SAR, T409/SAR (T450, T480)
- T600 Series: T600, T601, T604, T608, T609
- T650 Series: T650, T658
- T900 Series: T900 Classic, T904, T908, T900 Legend
- T950 Series: T950, T950 Tradition, T950 Legend
- K Series: K100, K123, K124, K125, K100E, K100G, K104, K104B, K108, K200

Current Australian Kenworth models include:

- T Series: T360, T410, T410 SAR, T610, T610 SAR, T659, T909
- C Series: C509, C510, C540
- K Series: K220

==== Mexico ====
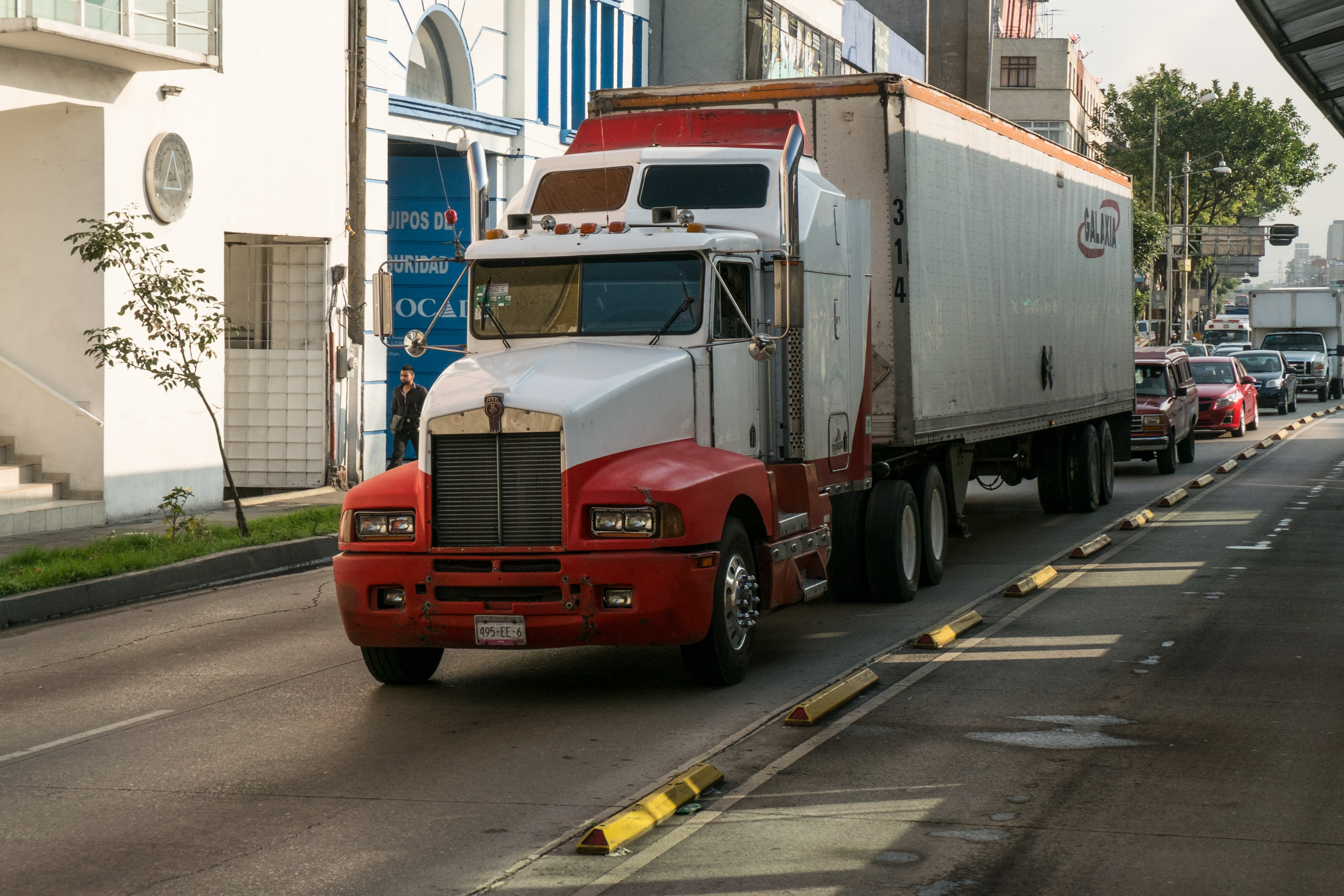
Kenworth Truck (Mexico)

In the early 2000s Kenworth introduced the T604 to Mexico, based on the Australian T604 with a few modifications, mostly in the hood.

== Operations ==
Kenworth currently has manufacturing plants in Chillicothe, Ohio; Renton, Washington, US; Sainte-Thérèse, Quebec, Canada; Bayswater, Victoria, Australia (Kenworth Australia); and Mexicali, Baja California, Mexico.

== Bus production ==
Bus production was a mainstay at Kenworth during the early years of company history; at one time, buses were its most lucrative form of business. When the company was still known as Gerlinger Motor Car Works, their first two full-chassis vehicles were school buses based on the Gersix truck chassis.

=== 1920s ===
==== BU series ====
In 1926, Kenworth developed a chassis specifically for school and transit bus operators, known as the BU. The BU model sported a wheelbase of 212 inches (5,400 mm) that was expanded two more inches in 1927, and could be fitted with bodies ranging from 21 to 29 passengers. The BU model also heralded the return of the Buda six-cylinder engine, and remained the company's principal offering through 1931. The new model became so popular in the Pacific Northwest that production rose from 99 units in 1927 and 127 units in 1927, to 230 units by 1930.

By that time, the predominant number of BU models produced were sent to school bus body builders and were built for use in school districts throughout the Seattle and Puget Sound area of Washington state.

=== 1930s ===
==== KHC series ====
Kenworth continued expanding into bus production throughout the 1930s, despite the Great Depression being a major influence. To assist Kenworth's 80 factory workers - who were idled by the Depression, the company undertook a bold move by introducing a new line of buses in August 1932. Known as the KHC-22 (Kenworth - Heiser - City), the 23-passenger bus was developed by Kenworth engineers as a stock demo vehicle to help aid a glum sales picture, and to jumpstart the local economy. At a time of mild economic recovery, the KHC22 proved to be very popular and sparked a renewed interest in Kenworth buses. Major operators of the KHC-22 (later expanded to a 225-inch (5,700 mm) wheelbase, 33-passenger KHC-33, in September 1933) were the Portland Railway, Light & Power Company of Portland, Oregon, and Spokane United Railways.

Production of Kenworth buses continued throughout the 1930s and into the early 1940s, and during this time Kenworth was manufacturing bus chassis for body builders such as Wentworth and Irwin (later renamed Wentwin), and Heiser. Heiser, long an often chosen body for school buses bearing Kenworth chassis, would later be purchased by Pacific Car and Foundry Company in 1937.

==== Model 870 and 871 ====
In 1933, Kenworth also released its most popular and successful line of transit bus, a conventional styled bus based on their Model 86 heavy duty truck. Powered by a Hercules JXCM engine, the model 870 as it was known, would soon be replaced by a model 871, which became Kenworth's standard line of buses throughout the early and mid-1930s. Experiments with "deck-and-a-half" buses would soon follow, made reality in the W-1 model, as well as the company's very first experiments with rear-engine coach-type buses in 1936.

==== Transit buses ====
Kenworth changed its production line early in 1939, reflecting a desire to remain "in tune" with market forces. The conventional bus chassis, which had become poor sellers, were dropped altogether, and Kenworth focused its designs on more transit or "coach-type" buses with engines being located either underfloor or at the back of the bus.

By this time, Kenworth was a major force in transit bus production, and nearly every major transit company in the Pacific Northwest were running Kenworth buses. Seattle Municipal Railway purchased several new model 601s to replace the previous model H30s, which were powered by a Hall-Scott 135 engine underfloor and had bodies built by the Pacific Car and Foundry Company. Kenworth also built a model 612, which became the company's most widely distributed underfloor coach. 27 were built with 14 wheelbase variations (and seven engine variations), and all 27 were sold by as many as 15 different operators.

=== 1940s ===
At the beginning of the decade, bus customers began to decline in number, but the company received larger orders as several regional operators consolidated into larger, territorial ones. Bremerton Transit purchased several buses in 1940 to accommodate the increase in ridership due to the preparations for the war itself; the same year, the Seattle Municipal Railway purchased 30 buses in a single order, assisting Kenworth in breaking a production record. Producing about 40 buses yearly, Kenworth became a low-volume bus manufacturer, accommodating special-order coaches. Gray Line affiliates Seattle, Portland, and Vancouver purchased several of these special coach orders known as Grayliner or Grayliner Junior buses; the bodies for these buses were all built by Pacific Car and Foundry.

At the onset of World War II, war production took precedence over bus manufacturing as Kenworth supplied recovery vehicles for the U.S. Army. Along with military variations of their commercial truck line, Kenworth buses remained in production for use as troop transports. In 1945, Kenworth was sold to Pacific Car and Foundry; both companies believed bus production would play a pivotal role in jumpstarting a postwar economy. Kenworth also saw the opportunity in hiring former military truck and aircraft workers as part of launching its post-war product line. For 1946, Kenworth launched four new model lines of buses, deriving their model designations from the first four letters of the company name. The Model K was a line of small intercity/interurban buses; the Model E, a trolley coach; the Model N, a city transit bus; the Model W, an intercity bus.

Subsequently, Kenworth added the Model O one-door transit bus and Model T prototype school bus. Ultimately, the company built trolley buses for just one city – a single order of 50 of model E2 built in 1947–48 for the Portland Traction Company, in Portland, Oregon.

==== Model K, N, W ====
Outwardly similar in appearance, the Model K intercity/interurban and Model W intercity bus differed in function, size, and layout. The Model K was shorter, with a capacity of 25-33 passengers; the longer Model W seated 31-41 passengers. The Model K was equipped with a rear-mounted International Red Diamond RD450 while the Model W used a horizontally mounted underfloor Hall-Scott 190 engine. The Model N, in its original configuration, was a 36-44 passenger bus; after the design found no takers, the vehicle was downsized in 1947 to a 32-36 passenger bus.

After 1947, Kenworth revised its model designations, assigning numerals to its model lines to signify evolutionary variants of each design.

==== Kenworth "Brucks" ====
As production orders for the interurban model Ks and model Ws waned, Kenworth focused its attention on special orders including an order of 10 "Brucks" for Great Northern Railway in Montana, (an earlier version was built for Northern Pacific Transport, but was a split-level coach) and several Highway Post Office coaches.

These "special order coaches" were based on the Model T school bus, which entered production in early 1949. The company also test-marketed a small 20-passenger bus known as the Carcoach (only one example was built).

=== 1950s ===
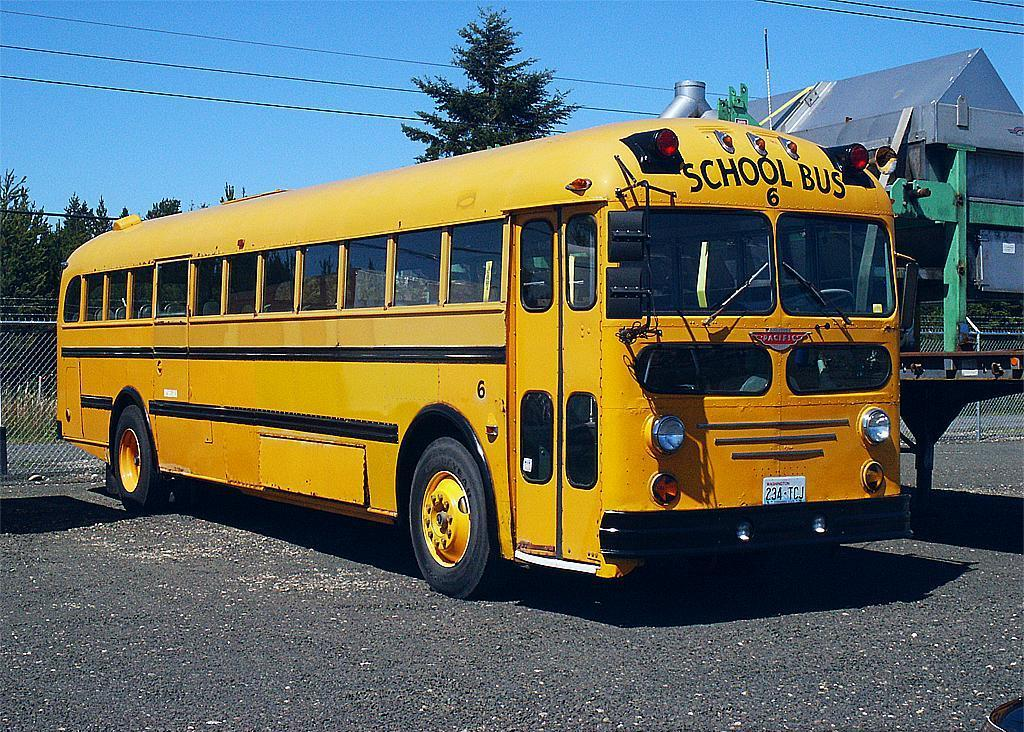
1955 Kenworth T-126 "Pacific School Coach"

==== Model T and CT ====
The Model T school bus, which entered production after the last bus was built for Great Northern in April 1949, was an immediate hit with many school bus operators in the Pacific Northwest. The T-126 as it was known, boasted a unique four-pane windshield that offered unheralded forward visibility in any school bus at the time, and was the first school bus ever built to feature a roof escape hatch (now required equipment). Production of the T-126 averaged over 375 buses per year, making it Kenworth's most lucrative bus offering in the company's history up to that time.

Shortly after its launch, Kenworth renamed the line the model CT. The model CT also came in several varying passenger capacities ranging from 55, 61, 67, 73, and 79 passengers. The model CT "Pacific School Coach" was powered by an International Red Diamond 450 inline six-cylinder gas engine placed at the rear of the bus, and a LeRoi H540 engine was made available for an LR-73 model that was produced in August 1950. Some orders for modified model CTs were made available and sold internationally, with variants being sold to Uruguay and Venezuela, as well as the Middle East.

==== End of production ====
After the boom of school bus production, and to focus more on truck production due to a rising number of heavy duty truck orders, all bus production was shifted from Kenworth over to Pacific Car and Foundry in the middle of 1956. After some final cleanup, PC&F wound up completely outstanding orders for the Pacific School Coach in early 1957. Shortly afterwards, PC&F sold all rights, tooling, and equipment to school bus manufacturer Gillig Bros. of Hayward, California.

Following the acquisition, multiple features of the Model T/CT were integrated into the Gillig Transit Coach line of school buses; the model line was produced until 1982.

== Reception ==
The brand claims to maintain an image of high quality, it has won five of six JD Power Awards in 2005, and was a clear sweep in the 2007 J.D. Power Awards for Heavy Duty Truck Product Satisfaction.

== Gallery ==
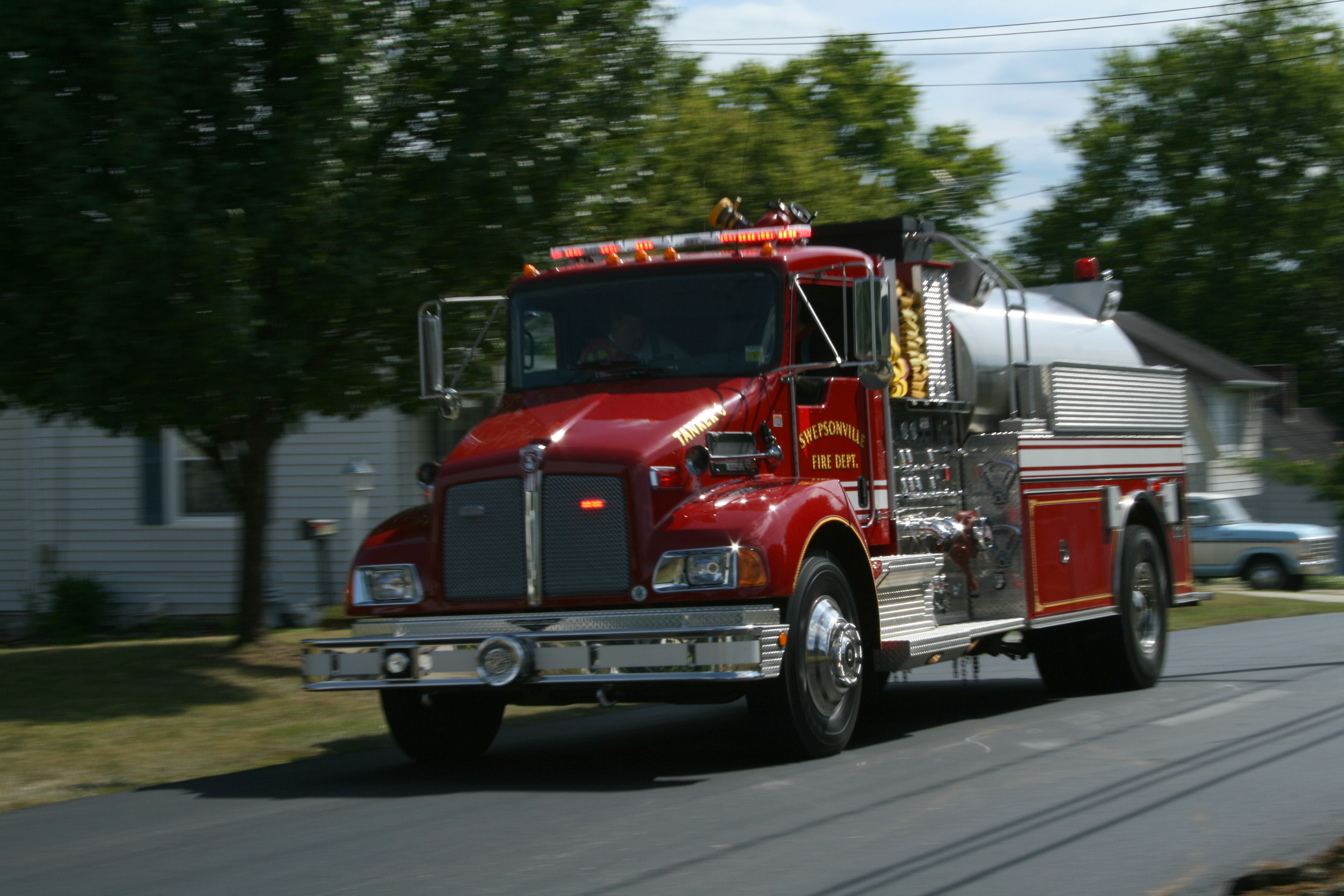

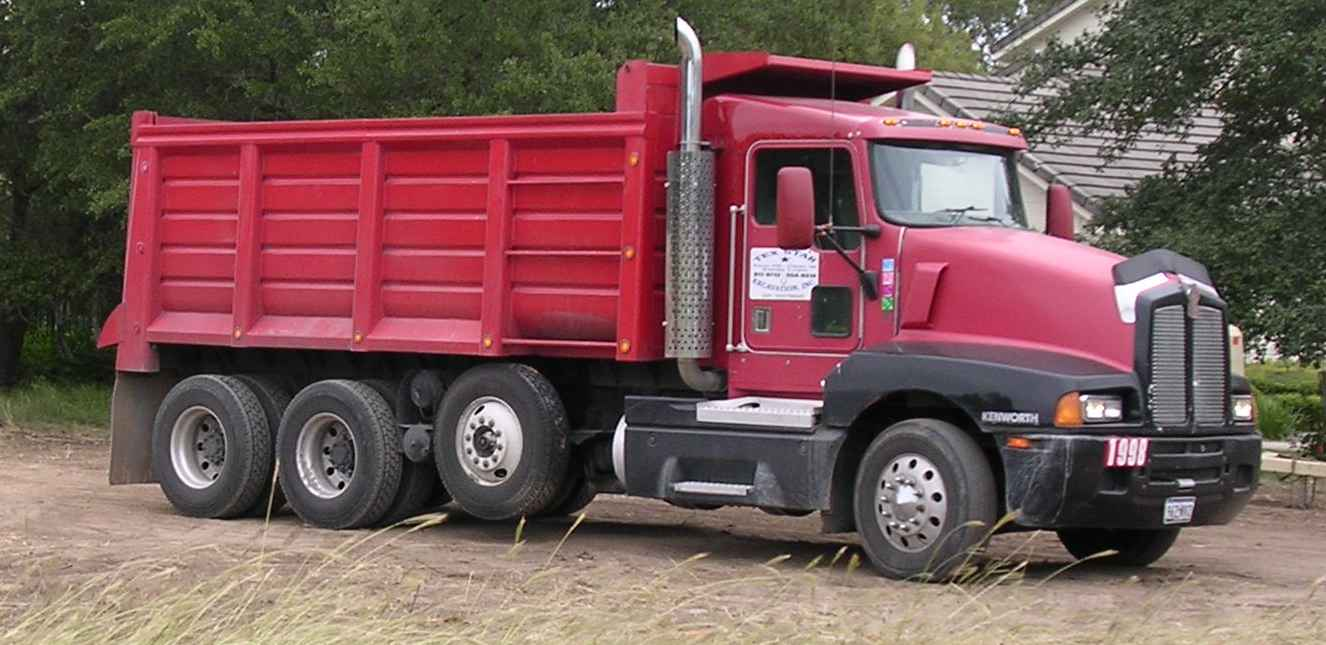

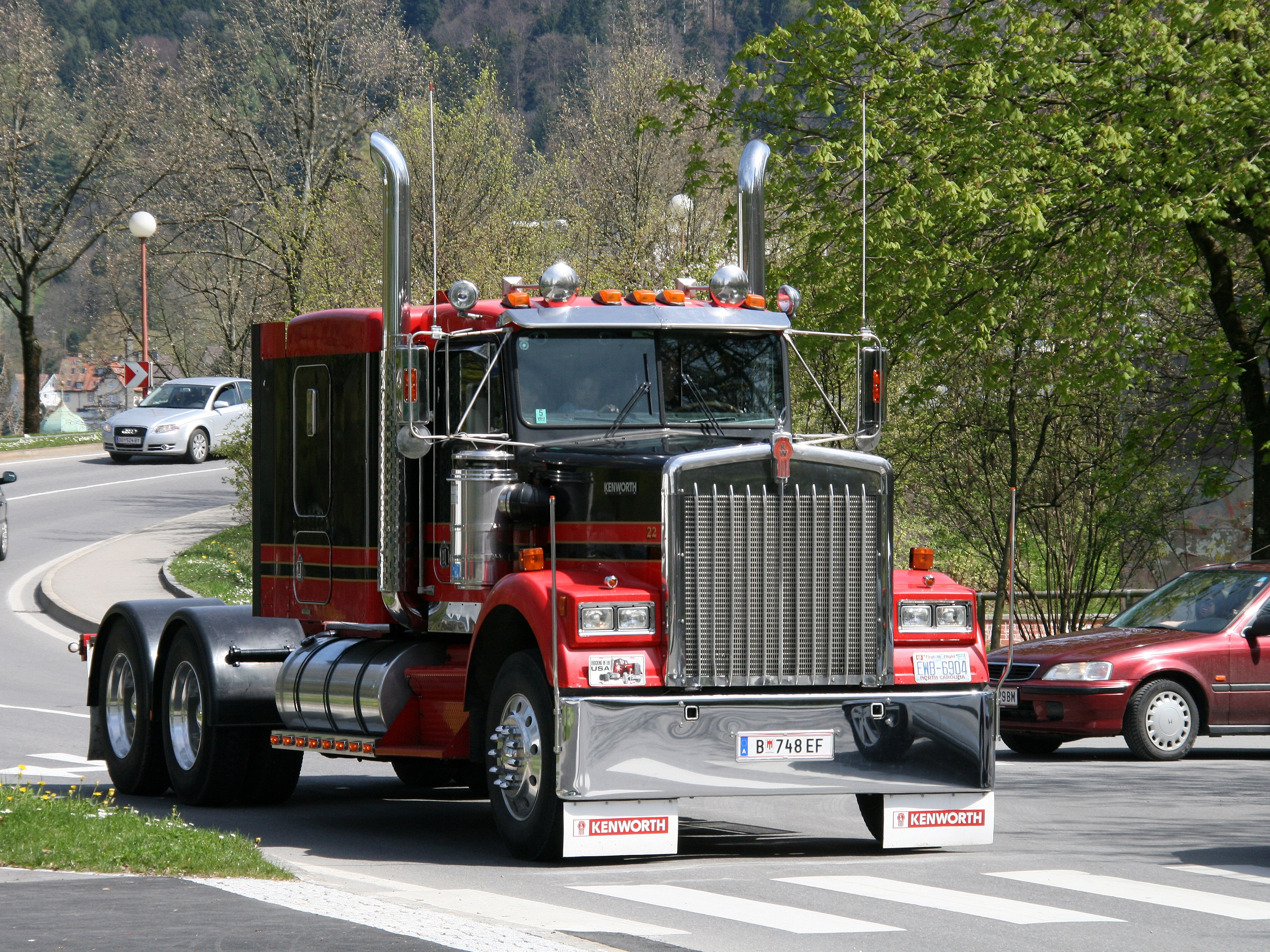

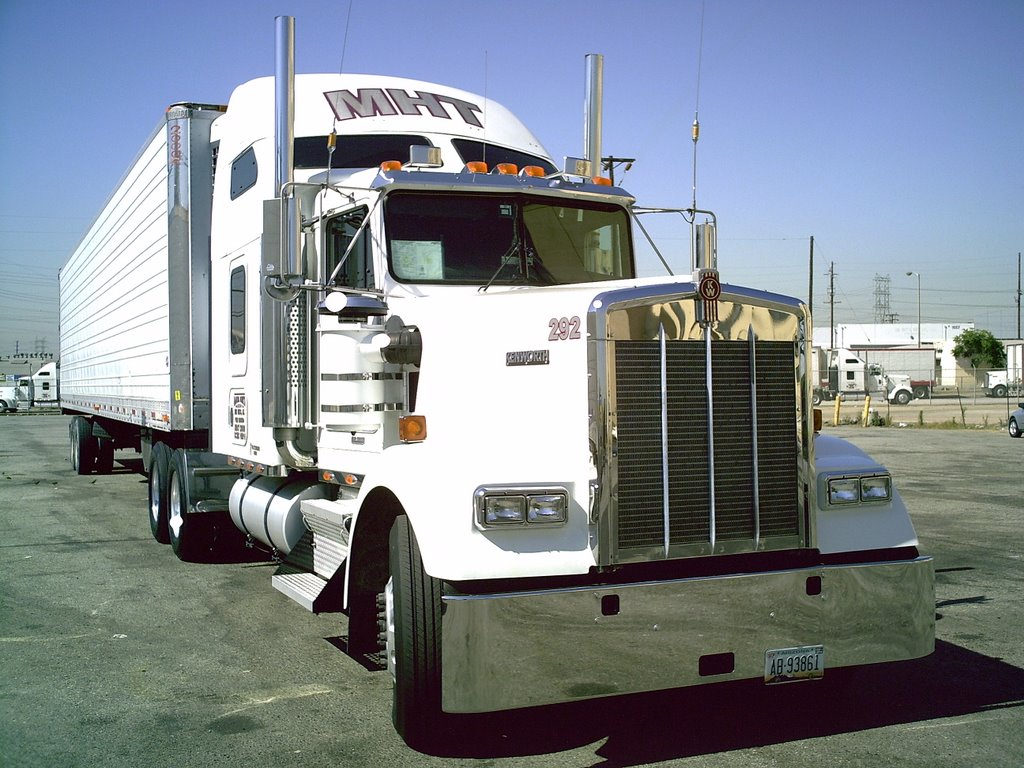

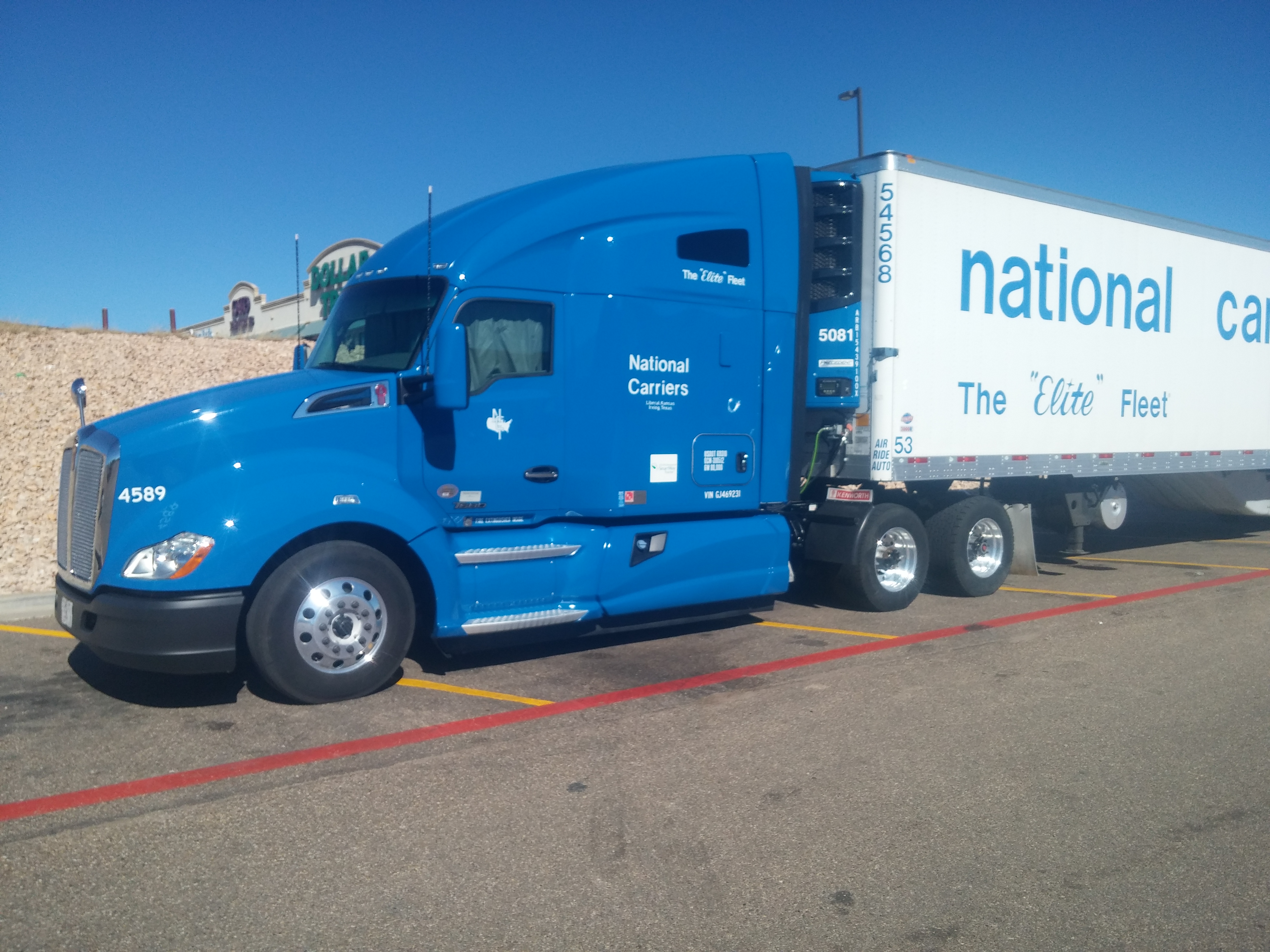

== See also ==
- Paccar
  - Peterbilt (Kenworth's sister company in Paccar)
  - Dart (commercial vehicle) (Kenworth's sister company in Paccar)
  - DAF Trucks
- Murphy-Hoffman Company (Largest US Kenworth dealership)
- Gillig Corporation
- Class 8 Trucks
- Semi-trailer truck
- Dump Truck
