= Peterbilt Madison Plant =

- Operated: 1969–2009
- Location: 430 Myatt Drive; Madison, Tennessee, United States
- Coordinates: 36°16′27″N 86°41′30″W
- Industry: Automotive
- Products: trucks
- Employees: 390 (2009)
- Area: 68 acres (28 ha)
- Volume: 202,000 square feet (18,800 m^{2})
- Owner: Peterbilt (Paccar)

Peterbilt Madison Plant was a Peterbilt truck manufacturing plant in Madison, Tennessee, owned by Paccar.

== History ==
The plant traces its roots back to 1969 as Peterbilt opened its facility to produce Peterbilt 352 and 282 Cab-Over-Engine (COE) "Pacemaker" models. Along with the ability to meet additional product demand, the location was chosen to serve customers closer to the East Coast.

In 1973, production of the Madison facility was doubled, allowing the company to deliver 8,000 vehicles yearly. In 1981, the Madison facility began assembly of the Model 362 COE.

In August 2000, Peterbilt laid off approximately 370 assembly line workers and 60 salaried employees at the Madison plant, and reduced the daily production rate from 50 to 35 trucks per day due to an industry-wide slowdown in heavy truck sales.

On September 2, 2002, Peterbilt officially barred 750 union workers from entering the plant because a major labor contract dispute erupted between Peterbilt's parent company, PACCAR, and the United Auto Workers (UAW) Local 1832. Production of Peterbilt trucks was temporarily shifted to the company's non-union plant in Denton, Texas. Just one week prior to the lockout, 500 of those workers had already been issued layoff notices due to declining truck sales. Approximately 10 months later, approximately 250 union workers returned to work on July 2, 2003, after reaching a settlement.

In February 2007, Peterbilt laid off between 677 and 750 employees at the plant, cutting its local workforce by more than half.

In June 2008, Peterbilt halted production at the plant following a failure to reach a new contract agreement with the United Auto Workers (UAW) Local 1832. In April 2009, Peterbilt officially announced a temporary shutdown of the idled facility due to worsening economic conditions and dropping sales.

On September 29, 2009, PACCAR announced it will permanently close the Peterbilt truck manufacturing plant in Madison, Tennessee by December 1, 2009, and will lay off 390 workers at the plant; shifting all US Peterbilt truck production to Denton, Texas. This was caused by falling market demand and a 70% drop in sales over the prior 18 months, leading PACCAR to align production capacity with market needs.

In 2010, the plant was acquired by The Metropolitan Government of Nashville and Davidson County in partnership with the Metropolitan Transit Authority (MTA) for $16 million. MTA contributed $9.4 million to relocate its administrative offices and bus maintenance operations, which had sustained severe damage during the May 2010 Nashville floods. Today, the site operates as a primary hub for WeGo Public Transit.

== Products made ==
- Peterbilt 352
- Peterbilt 282
