= T.A. Peterman =

American businessman (1893–1944)

- Born: March 22, 1893; Tacoma, Washington
- Died: November 16, 1944 (aged 51); Vancouver, Washington
- Known for: Founding the Peterbilt Motors Company.

T.A. Peterman, short for Theodore Alfred "Al" Peterman, was the founder of Peterbilt Motors Company.

== Early life ==
Theodore Alfred Peterman was born on March 22, 1893 to Theodore F. Peterman, a German and the founder of Peterman Manufacturing Company, and his mother, Katherine Corcoran. The Roblin Roll of Non-Reservation Indians in Western Washington (1919) lists Theodore Alfred Peterman as having Cowlitz ancestry through his mother.

== Early career ==
Peterman's early business career was in logging and timber in Washington state. He owned a mill in Tacoma that produced plywood. For company use, he began to invest in modifying and rebuilding surplus military vehicles and older logging trucks. One early invention, in association with an employee Ed Valentine, was the use of a drum brake not cooled by water. He lived in Morton, Washington during the 1930s, opening a logging company specifically for his mill. During his time in Morton, Peterman introduced another advancement, the use of trailer rollers to allow logs to shift during transport, preventing momentum from carrying trucks off the road during cornering. Peterman, who went by the nickname Al, was described as tall and "rangy", and reputed by townspeople to be kind and a "renaissance man in the logging world." He left Morton in 1940.

== Peterbilt Motors Company ==
In 1939, with a need to expand his timber interests and a desire to build to custom logging trucks, he acquired Fageol Truck and Coach Company of Oakland, California from Sterling Motor Truck Co. Peterman sought to build his vehicles with a focus on quality and within two years, the vehicles were beginning to be recognized as such. The first Peterbilt trucks were nearly identical in appearance to the former Fageol designs.

== Death ==
Peterman died of cancer on November 16, 1944, in Vancouver, Washington. Following his death, his wife, Ida Peterman, sold the company’s assets, and the business eventually became part of Peterbilt Motors Company.
