= Peterbilt 379 =

Model of heavy semi-trailer truck

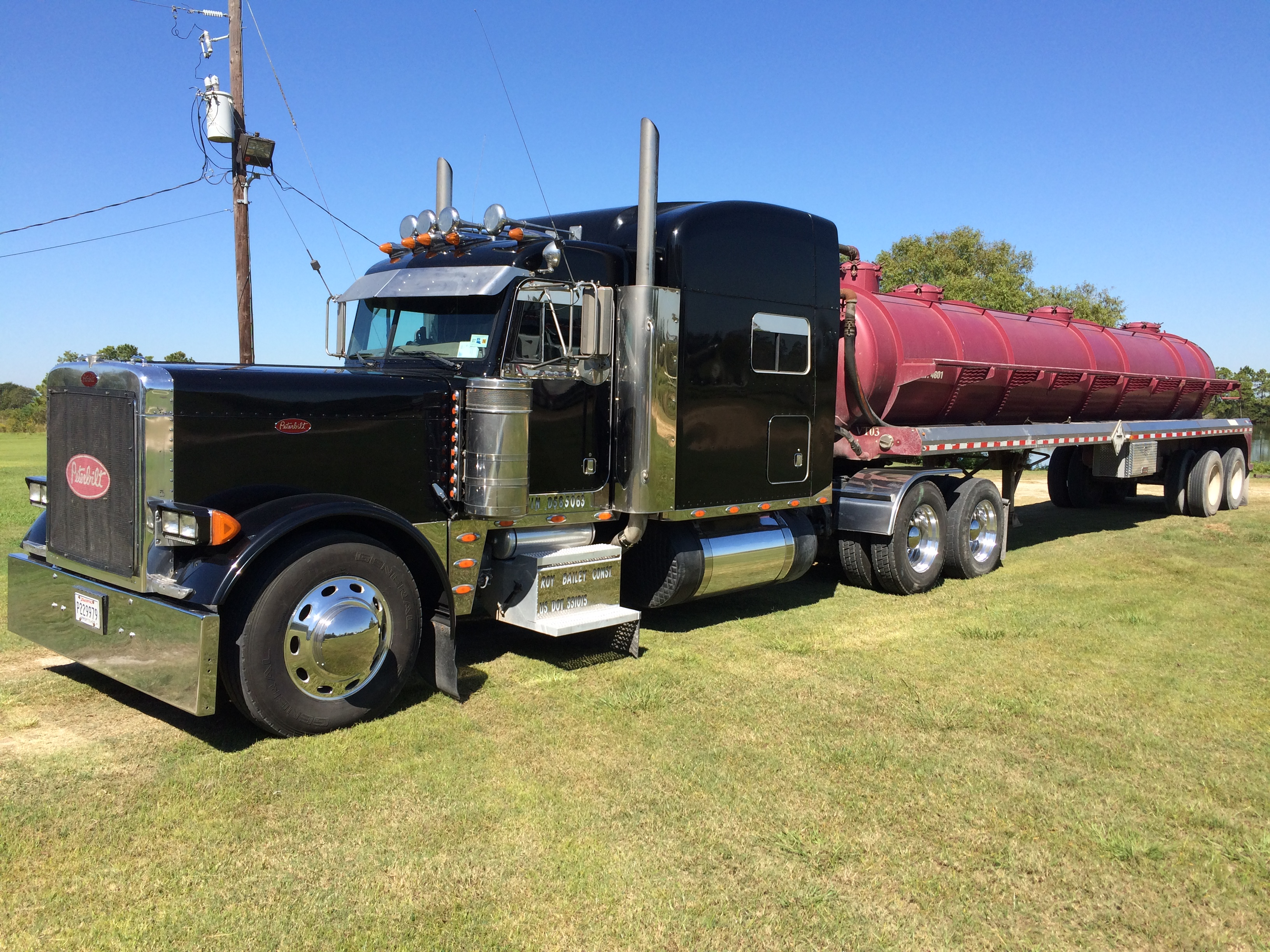
- 2003 Peterbilt 379 American Class interior 550 hp CAT C15 18 speed

Overview
- Type: Truck
- Manufacturer: Peterbilt
- Model years: 1987–2007
- Assembly: United States: Denton, Texas (Denton Plant)

Body and chassis
- Class: Class 8 truck
- Body style: 2-door truck 2-door sleepercab truck
- Layout: 6x4
- Related: Peterbilt 377; Kenworth W900

Powertrain
- Engine: Diesel (Cummins, Caterpillar, Detroit Diesel, Paccar)

Chronology
- Predecessor: Peterbilt 359 (1967–1986)
- Successor: Peterbilt 389

The Peterbilt 379 is a model line of Class 8 trucks that was produced by the Peterbilt division of PACCAR from 1987 to 2007. Serving as the successor to the 359, the 379 was a conventional-cab truck configured primarily for highway use, serving as the flagship of the Peterbilt model line. During much of its production, the 379 was popular among owner-operator drivers. In line with the Kenworth W900, the 379 serves as a popular basis for truck customization.

Following its 2007 discontinuation, the 379 was replaced by the Peterbilt 389, distinguished by oval headlamp clusters and a longer hood. To commemorate the end of production, the final 1000 examples of the 379 were designated as Legacy Class 379.

== Overview ==
The largest highway truck sold by Peterbilt at its launch, the 379 was produced in two configurations, a 119-inch BBC (bumper to back of cab length) and an extended-length hood, for a 127-inch BBC. The 379 is externally distinguished from the 359 from the use of an enlarged windshield (allowing for horizontally mounted windshield wipers); the 379 also introduced headlamp-mounted turn signals (relocated from the fender), making rectangular headlamps standard.

The cab structure of the 379 is shared with numerous Peterbilt conventional trucks produced since 1987 (with the exception of the 587 and 579); it also shares its doors with the 362 and 372 cabover trucks.

=== Powertrain ===
Throughout its production, the 379 was equipped with the most powerful versions of the engines offered in Class 8 on-highway vehicles. Some of the turbodiesel engines included Caterpillar's 3406(B/C/E/P), C11, C-10, C-12, C13, C-15 (the C15 in the 379 were available with the MXS and BXS prefixes since 2004 and MBN prefix in 2001 as a "bridge" engine), C-16, Cummins' NTC, N14, Signature 600, ISX, ISM, and Detroit Diesel's 60-series.

== See also ==
- Peterbilt
