= Peterbilt 281 =

Peterbilt 281/351
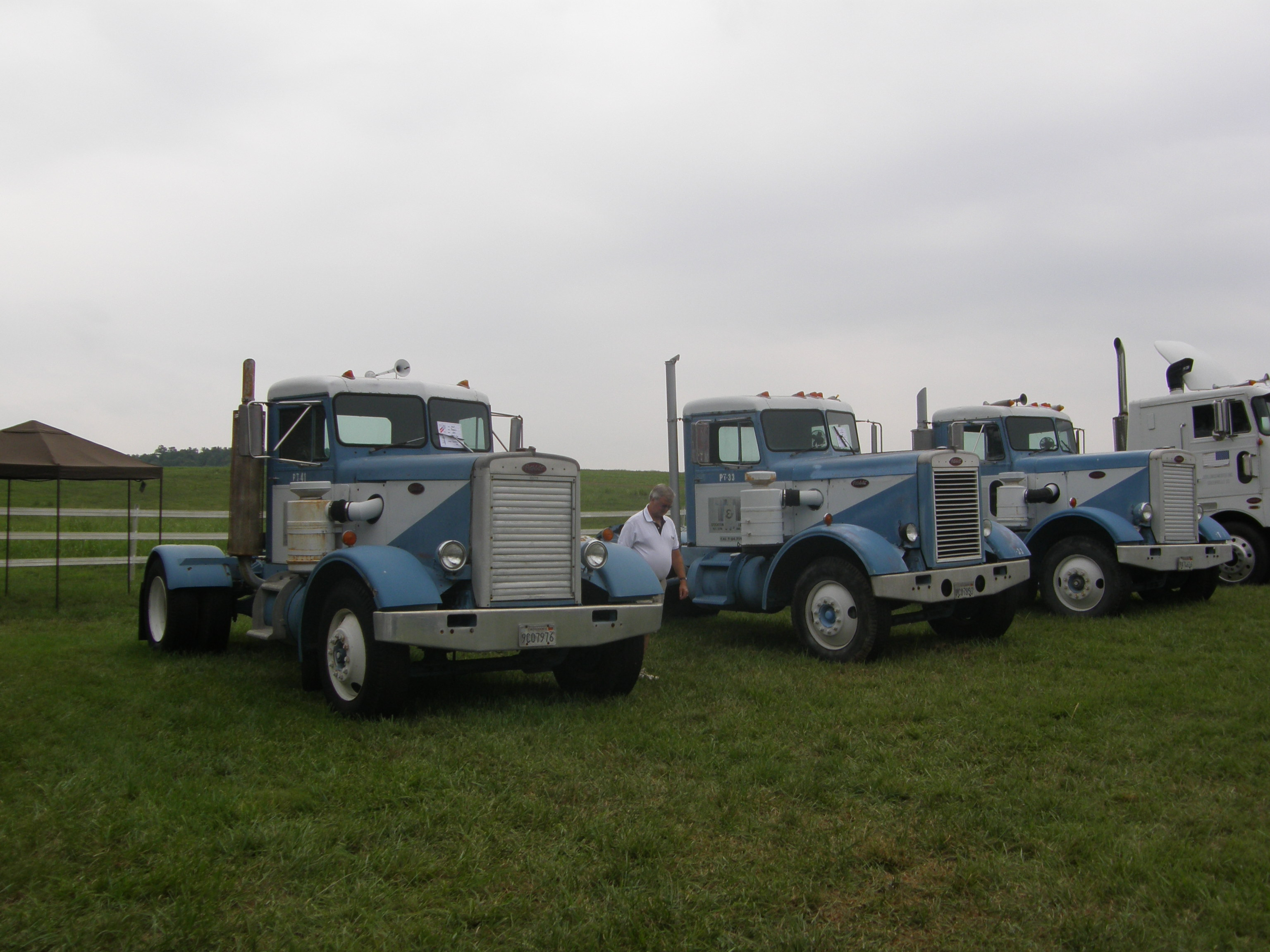
- Line-up of three mid-1960s Peterbilt 281s

Overview
- Type: Truck
- Manufacturer: Peterbilt
- Production: 1954–1976
- Assembly: Oakland, California

Body and chassis
- Class: Class 8 truck
- Body style: 2-door day cab truck, 2-door sleeper cab truck

Powertrain
- Engine: Cummins NTC350 small cam
- Transmission: 5-speed Spicer manual 13-speed Fuller Roadranger; 10-speed manual

Chronology
- Predecessor: Peterbilt 280/350
- Successor: Peterbilt 359

The Peterbilt 281/351 is a line of tractor units built by Peterbilt between 1954 and 1976. The 281 series had a single drive axle, the 351 two. It was very popular with truckers, with the 351 series outlasting the 281.

== History ==
The Peterbilt 281 emerged from Peterbilt's assembly plant in Oakland, California in 1954.

It earned the nickname "Needlenose" from its narrow nose and butterfly hood, popular with truckers for ease of engine access and superior visibility. Like its companion series 351, it had only two small round headlights.

Remaining in production until 1976, the 281/351 was a durable and popular series. The basic design made way for different models, with tilt cab-over-engine models introduced in 1959.

A model 281 was prominently featured in the made-for-TV movie Duel, directed by 23-year-old Steven Spielberg, in 1971. When the film was released theatrically in overseas markets, additional scenes were filmed in order to lengthen it to 90-minute feature length. These additional scenes were shot with a Peterbilt 351, modified to match the original 281 as closely as possible. The 281 production was ended in 1976 to favor for the larger 359 which entered production in 1967 as a conventional Class 8 truck available with day cab and sleeper cab configurations. The 281 was available with a Cummins NTC350 small cam producing 350 horsepower.
