= Peterbilt Denton Plant =

- Operated: 1980–present
- Location: 3200 Airport Road; Denton, Texas, United States
- Coordinates: 33.2040°N 97.1760°W
- Industry: Automotive
- Products: trucks
- Employees: 2,500
- Area: 238 acres (96 ha)
- Volume: 700,000 square feet (65,000 m^{2})
- Owner: Peterbilt (Paccar)

Peterbilt Denton Plant is a Peterbilt truck manufacturing plant in Denton, Texas, owned by Paccar. The plant is the headquarters for the truck manufacturer, employing 2,500 people.

== History ==
The plant was opened in August 1980 as Peterbilt's third, 435,000-square-foot truck manufacturing plant on a 80-acre site, with the first truck, a white Peterbilt 359 known as "Old No. 1", rolling off the assembly line that same month.

In October 1986, Peterbilt closed its older, 176,000-square-foot Newark, California, truck manufacturing plant on a 33-acre site, consolidating its heavy-duty truck production into its newer facility in Denton, Texas. In 1993, Peterbilt relocated its corporate headquarters and engineering department to this Denton facility from Newark, California.

On October 9, 2000, Peterbilt reduced the daily production rate at the Denton plant from 68 to 48 trucks per day due to an industry-wide slowdown in heavy truck sales. In August 2005, the plant celebrated its 25th anniversary, having produced over 238,000 trucks since opening its doors in 1980. On January 26, 2009, Peterbilt laid off fewer than 172 employees at the plant due to a broader economic slowdown and reduced market demand.

The company opened a 4,300-square-foot visitor exhibit and museum in 2014 to showcase its history. By December 2015, the plant employed over 2,000 workers and produced more than 160 custom-built vehicles daily. In early 2016, Peterbilt broke ground on a 102,000-square-foot test and validation building north of the plant, which opened in January 2017.

On November 14, 2023, Peterbilt celebrated the production of its 750,000th vehicle at its plant, a Model 579 delivered to TMC Transportation. In October 2025, the plant delivered its 100,000th Model 567 heavy-duty vocational truck to WM (Waste Management) and produced its 10,000th Model 589. President Donald Trump toured the Denton plant on October 1, 2026, to promote domestic manufacturing, job growth, and his administration's 25% tariff on imported medium- and heavy-duty trucks.

== Products made ==
- Peterbilt 379 (1987–2007)
- Peterbilt 389
- Peterbilt 589
- Peterbilt 579
- Peterbilt 567
