= Peterbilt =

American truck manufacturer

Peterbilt Motors Company
- Type: Division
- Industry: Manufacturing
- Predecessor: Fageol
- Founded: 1939; 87 years ago
- Founder: T.A. Peterman
- Headquarters: Denton, Texas, U.S.
- Key people: Allan Ash (president and CEO) Jake Montero (general manager).
- Products: See listing
- Parent: PACCAR
- Website: www.peterbilt.com

Peterbilt Motors Company is an American truck manufacturer specializing in the production of heavy-duty (Class 8) and medium-duty (Classes 5–7) commercial vehicles. The namesake of company founder T. A. "Al" Peterman, it was established in 1939 from the acquisition of Fageol Truck and Motor Company, and has operated as part of PACCAR since 1958. Competing alongside sister division Kenworth Truck Company, it sustains one of the longest-running marketplace rivalries in American truck manufacturing.

Peterbilt trucks are identified by a red oval emblem that has been in use since 1953. A "bird"-style hood ornament has also been used on conventional-cab trucks since 1965.

Headquartered in Denton, Texas, the company also manufactures trucks at PACCAR facilities in Sainte-Thérèse, Quebec, Canada and Mexicali, Mexico.

== History ==
=== Background ===
Peterbilt was born out of the Pacific Northwest logging industry. In the first third of the 20th century, transporting logs remained time-consuming, primarily moved by steam tractors, horse teams, rail, and water. T.A. Peterman was a lumberman located in Tacoma, Washington, seeking to modernize log shipment to lumber mills to manufacture plywood.

In 1934, Peterman acquired 30,000 acres of forestland in Morton, Washington; instead of using railroads, he built roads and acquired a fleet of trucks, purchasing White Motor Company trucks surplused by the U.S. Army. For logging use, the former military vehicles underwent several refurbishments and modifications; along with upgrades to their durability, the trucks underwent a degree of modernization, notably replacing hand cranks with electric starters. Safety changes included the addition of air brakes and air-cooled (finned) brake drums.

On a 1938 business trip in San Francisco, Peterman learned that Fageol Truck and Motor Company was to be sold. Seeking an opportunity to expand into new vehicle production, he acquired Fageol from Sterling Motor Company for $50,000, receiving the 13.5-acre Fageol plant in Oakland, California, its tooling, and parts inventory; the purchase was completed in 1939.

=== 1939-1940s ===
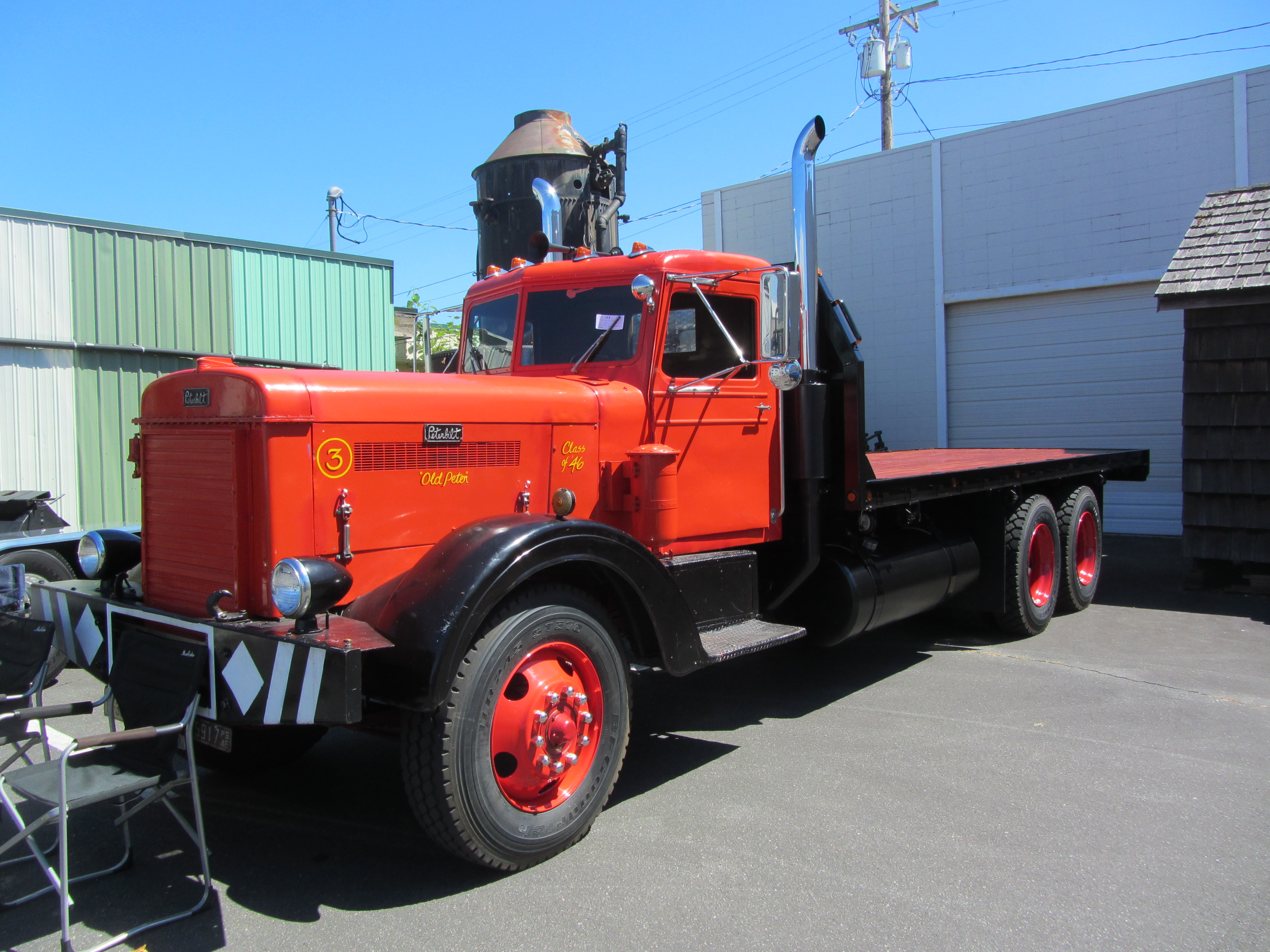
1946 Peterbilt flatbed

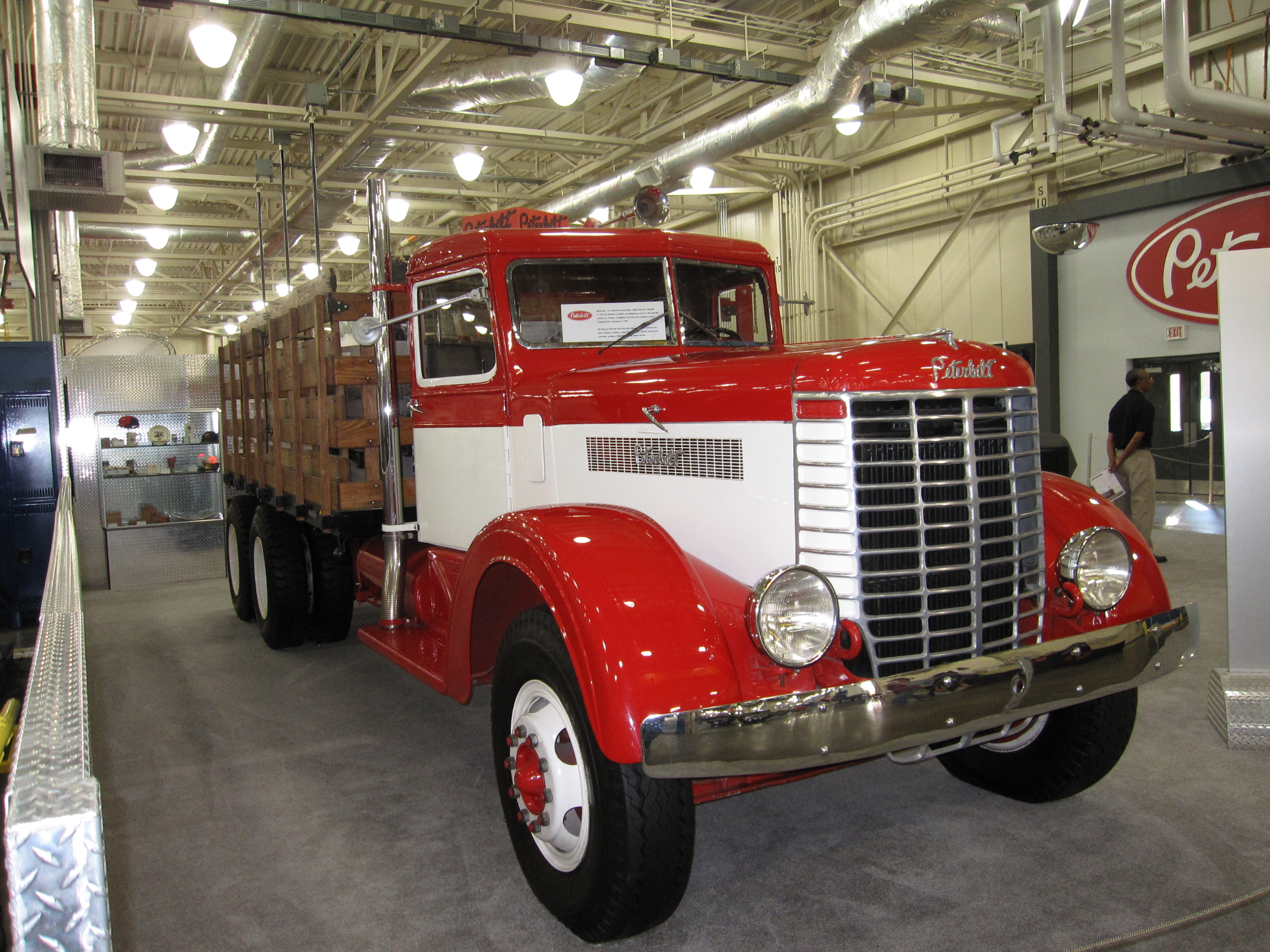
1939 Peterbilt Model 334 (1 of 2 built 1939)

In 1939, the Fageol plant in Oakland opened for business as Peterbilt Motors Company. As part of the design process, Peterman and his company engineers sought input from truck owners and drivers on how to develop trucks; initially planning to develop chain-drive trucks for the logging industry, the company transitioned towards vehicles intended towards highway freight transport. In April 1939, Peterbilt released its first vehicles for public sale, the single-axle Model 260 (chain drive) and the tandem-axle Model 334 (shaft-drive); both vehicles were offered with either gasoline or diesel engines. The 260 and 334 were equipped with an all-steel cab, trimmed with plywood sourced from Peterman-owned lumber mills. In a tradition that would last for the next 40 years, the company would designate single rear-axle trucks with model numbers starting with 2; tandem rear-axle trucks started with 3.

Through the end of the year, Peterbilt produced 16 vehicles; the first Peterbilt was a fire truck chassis built for Centerville (now Fremont), California. For 1940, production increased to 83 vehicles. To supplement its revenue, Peterbilt continued its practice of servicing and refurbishing trucks from all manufacturers.

For 1941, Peterbilt created the heavier-duty Model 364; initially developed for the logging industry, the 364 was re-purposed for military production for World War II. In 1942, the company developed its first cab-over-engine (COE) truck, which was derived from the 260. The vehicle was a half-cab design with a full-deck chassis.

In 1944, production was increased as Peterbilt secured a contract to supply 224 military trucks. In November 1944, T.A. Peterman died from cancer at the age of 51, leaving the company to his wife, Ida.

In 1945, the company resumed production of civilian vehicles; to increase payloads, Peterbilt introduced lighter aluminum-built cabs.

During 1947, Ida Peterman sold Peterbilt Motors Company to a group of company managers and investors for $450,000; while the investors received the company assets, Peterman retained ownership of the company real estate.

In 1949, the company released a second generation of trucks, replacing the 260/334 with the all-new Model 280/350. The "Iron Nose" conventional was distinguished by its tall, narrow grille (with vertical grille shutters) and cycle-style fenders (a design that remains in use today on some Peterbilt conventionals). The first mass-produced COE by Peterbilt, the "Bubble Nose" 280/350 COE relocated the cab of the conventional above the front axle (but still received a short hood).

=== 1950s ===
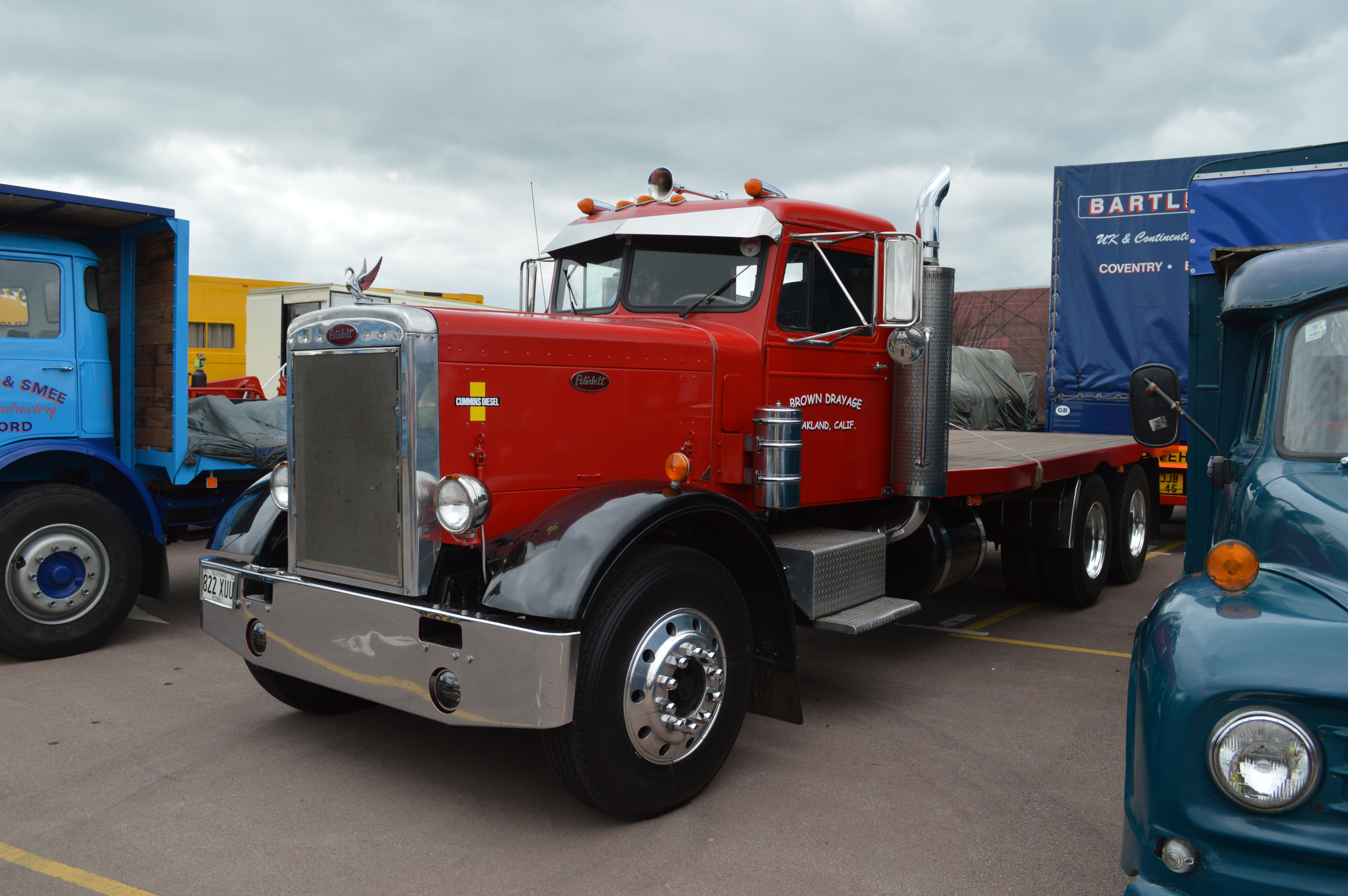
1954 Model 351 (one of the first red-oval trucks)

During the early 1950s, Peterbilt developed the "dromedary" cargo system; a longer-wheelbase truck (typically a COE) was configured to transport an auxiliary cargo system placed between the cab and trailer.

In 1953, Peterbilt introduced its current brand emblem, switching from a rectangular border to the current red oval.

In 1954, the 280/350 underwent a redesign, becoming the Model 281/351 "needle-nose" conventional; the grille was redesigned, converting to horizontal grille shutters. A 281/351 COE was introduced, introducing a larger, wider cab design (sharing only the doors with the conventional). The shorter-hood Model 341 was heavier-duty, intended for vocational applications.

In 1958, following a decline in truck sales, Ida Peterman (the owner of the company real estate) announced to company owners her plans to redevelop the factory site as a shopping center. Rather than take on the large investment of developing a new factory, the investment group chose to sell Peterbilt Motors Company in June 1958 to Pacific Car and Foundry, a Seattle-based company that specialized in production of railroad freight cars which had acquired local heavy truck manufacturer Kenworth in 1944. The new owners of Peterbilt began the relocation of the company, keeping it in the San Francisco Bay Area. In 1959, construction commenced on a 176,000 square-foot facility in Newark, California.

For 1959, the 281/351 COE was replaced by the 282/352 COE. While externally similar (though upgrading to quad headlamps), in a major change, the new design introduced a tilting cab to allow better access to the engine.

=== 1960s ===
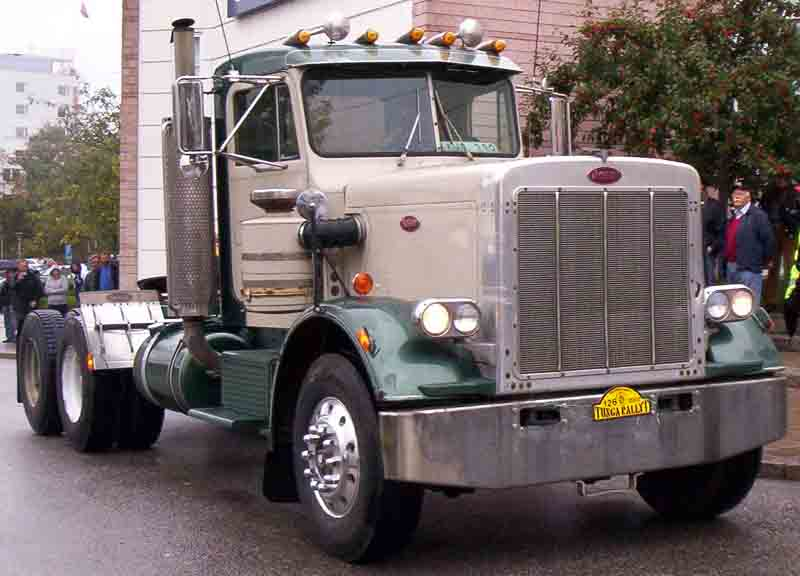
Peterbilt 359

In August 1960, the first Peterbilt trucks were assembled by the Newark, California, factory; production increased to 800 vehicles for 1960. Coinciding with the introduction of the new factory, Peterbilt debuted a redesigned "Unilite" cab for its conventional trucks, distinguished by larger windows and a redesigned interior (including an all-new instrument panel). In an organizational change, Pacific Car changed its ownership status of Peterbilt, converting it from a wholly owned subsidiary to a division within the company, making it the sister company of marketplace rival Kenworth (a division since 1946).

In 1965, Peterbilt introduced the Model 358, largely replacing the 351 (which remained in production). The first Peterbilt conventional with a tilting hood, the 288/358 replaced a fixed radiator (and grille shutters) with a grille surround attached to the aluminum hood (a fiberglass hood was added as an option in 1972). Serving partially as a grab handle, the Peterbilt "bird" hood ornament made its debut (a feature remaining in current production nearly unchanged).

In 1966, the company expanded its model line beyond highway tractors, reintroducing heavy-duty trucks as part of its model line. Above the Model 341, the Model 383 was a 6x6 truck primarily for off-road construction use.

In 1967, Peterbilt introduced the Model 359 highway tractor. Similar in design to the 358, the 289/359 also used a tilting hood, but was fitted with a larger grille (to accommodate larger diesel engines).

In 1969, Peterbilt expanded its production capability, opening a facility in Madison, Tennessee, in suburban Nashville. Along with the ability to meet additional product demand, the location was chosen to serve customers closer to the East Coast. As part of a revision to the cab design, the 282/352 COE adopted the name "Pacemaker".

=== 1970s ===
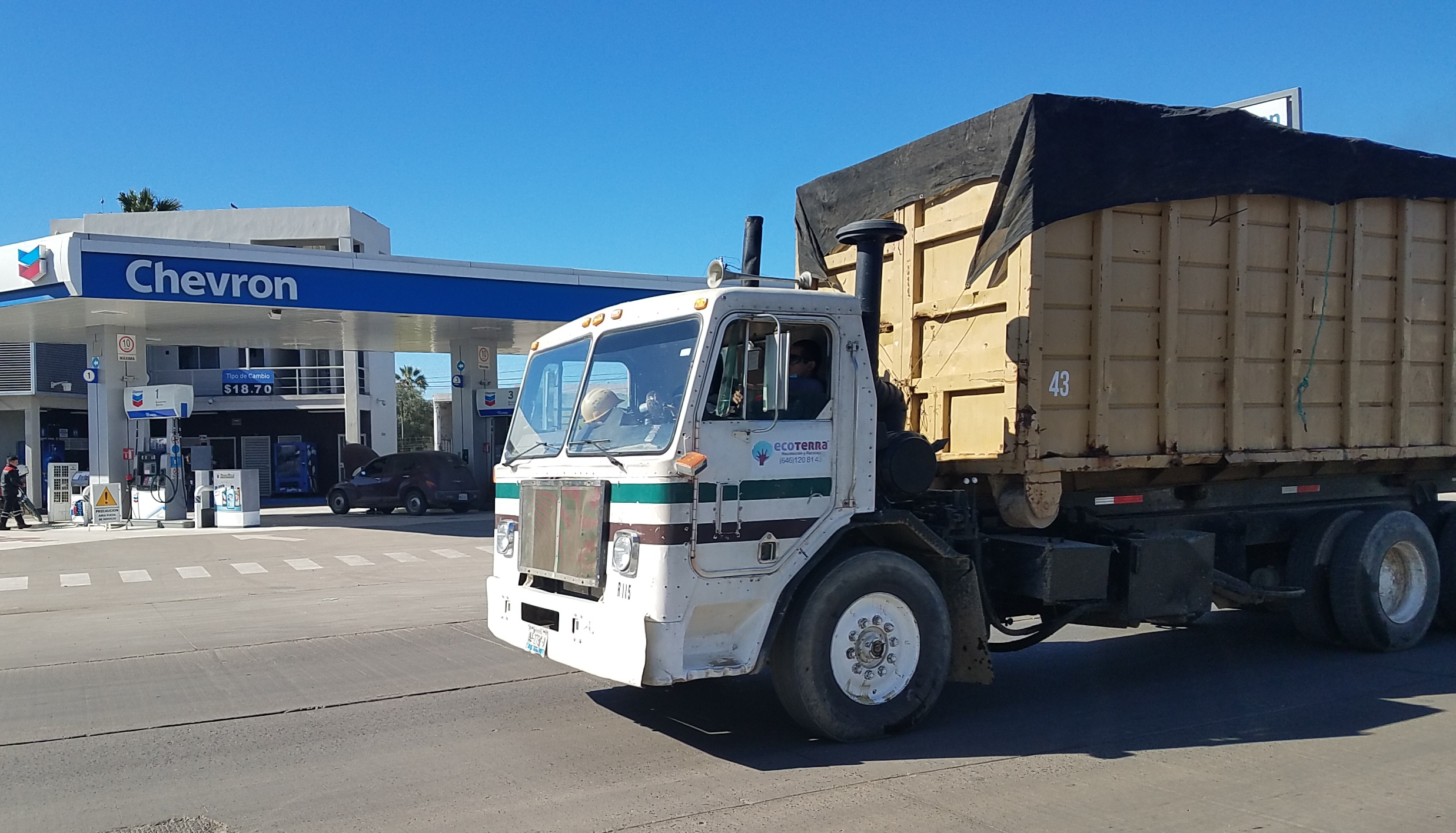
Peterbilt 310 COE

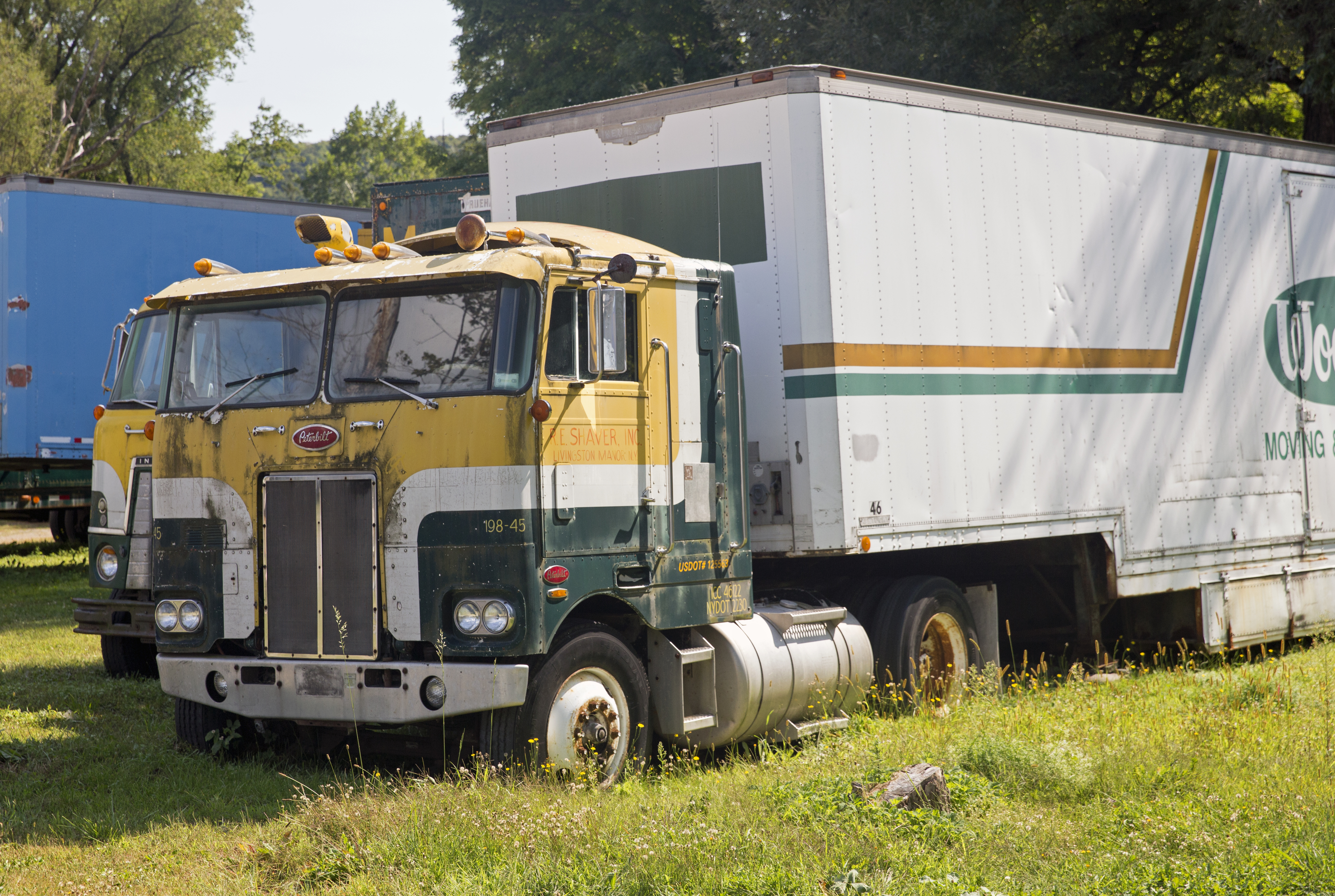
Peterbilt 282 (352 single-axle) COE

In 1970, the Model 348 was introduced, gradually replacing the 341 (remaining until 1972). Intended for vocational use, the 348 was the first Peterbilt designed with an angled fiberglass hood; the 349 was similar in configuration, designed with a larger grille. Developed in a joint venture with Kenworth, Peterbilt released the CB300, a low-cab COE developed nearly exclusively for refuse transport.

At the beginning of 1972, Pacific Car and Foundry, intending to exit steel manufacturing, introduced its current name, PACCAR. The same year, Peterbilt redesigned the cab for its conventionals, replacing the "Unilite" cab with the "1100-series" cab. Named for 1100 square inches of windshield glass, the new design was taller with redesigned doors, an all-new interior, and increased window space. Designed for the same applications for the slightly larger 383, the Model 346 6x6 was designed with a set-back front axle (placed nearly below the cab). For testing, the company developed a prototype vehicle powered by a jet-turbine engine; the design was not placed into production.

In 1973, the Model 353 was introduced as a construction-oriented variant of the 359 (using its wider grille), replacing the 341 and heavy-duty versions of the 351; production of the Madison facility was doubled, allowing the company to deliver 8,000 vehicles yearly. In 1974, a set-back front axle was added to the 359.

In 1975, Peterbilt expanded its manufacturing base a second time, introducing Peterbilt Canada in Sainte-Thérèse, Quebec, in Greater Montreal.; the facility began production of the CB300 (sold by Kenworth as the Hustler). Sized between the 353 and the 383, the 387 was another heavy-duty truck developed primarily for off-road use. The 352 COE underwent a model revision, becoming the 352H (high-mounted cab) to accommodate larger engines.

After a 22-year model run, the 281/351 was retired for 1976. Replaced by the 358 and 359 as the Peterbilt highway tractor over a decade earlier, the 351 had continued production as a heavy-duty truck built primarily for vocational use; in the early 1970s, its cycle-style fenders were replaced by flat steel fenders. The narrow-hood 358 was also retired, as the larger-grille 359 was better suited to the cooling needs of newer diesel engines.

In 1977, Peterbilt assembled its 100,000th vehicle, a long-hood Model 359. The model line underwent minor revisions, as the cab received a revised dashboard and an optional 63-inch sleeper cab with walk-through entry (a first for the model line).

For 1978, the CB300 was replaced by the Model 310. Again shared with Kenworth, the 310 was a new generation of the low-cab COE model line.

By 1979, Peterbilt began to revise its model nomenclature, phasing out separate designations for single rear-axle trucks; all trucks began to use model numbers starting with "3" (regardless of drive configuration).

=== 1980s ===
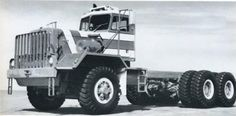
1980 Peterbilt 397 (largest Peterbilt ever built)

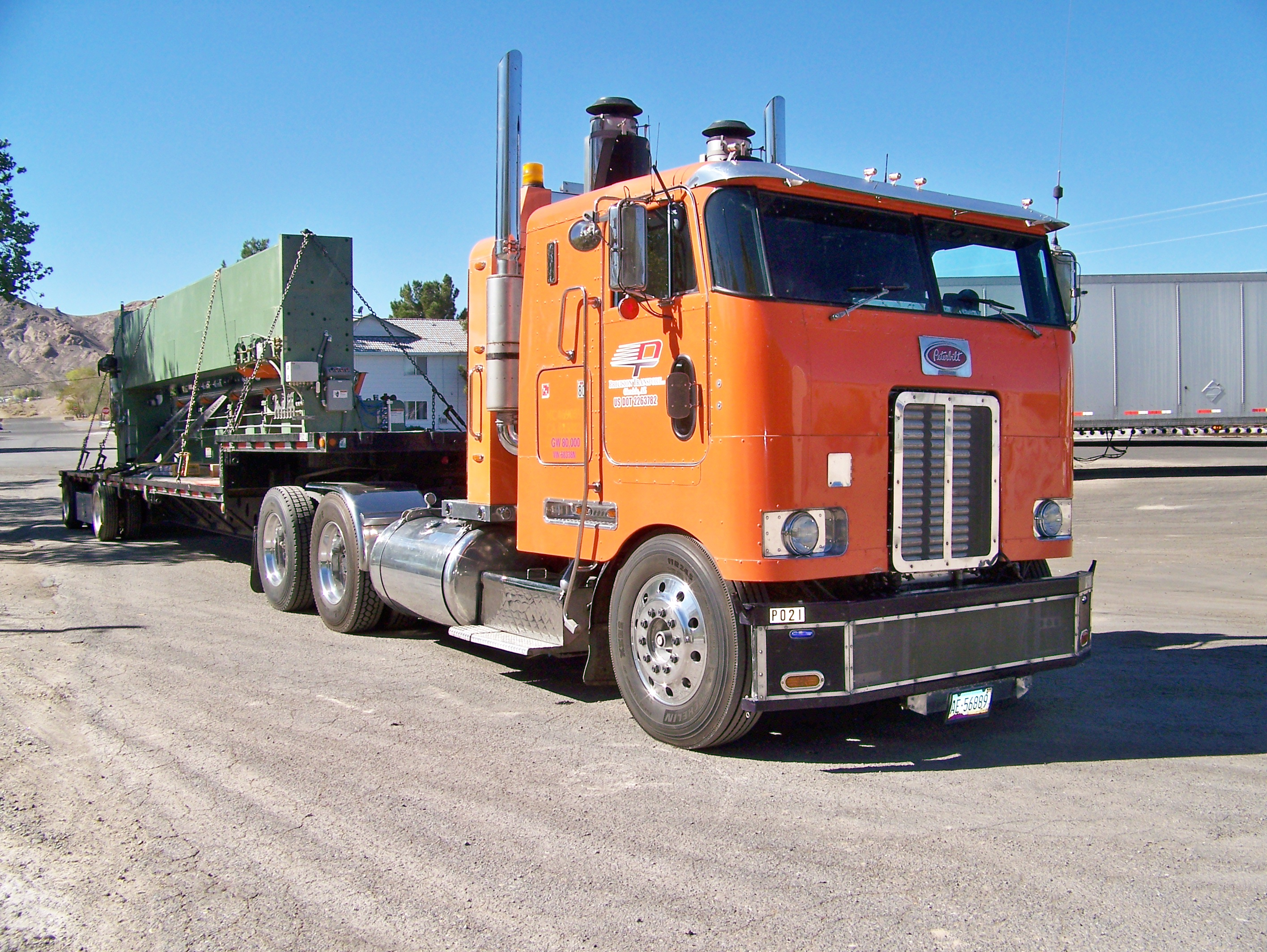
Peterbilt 362 COE

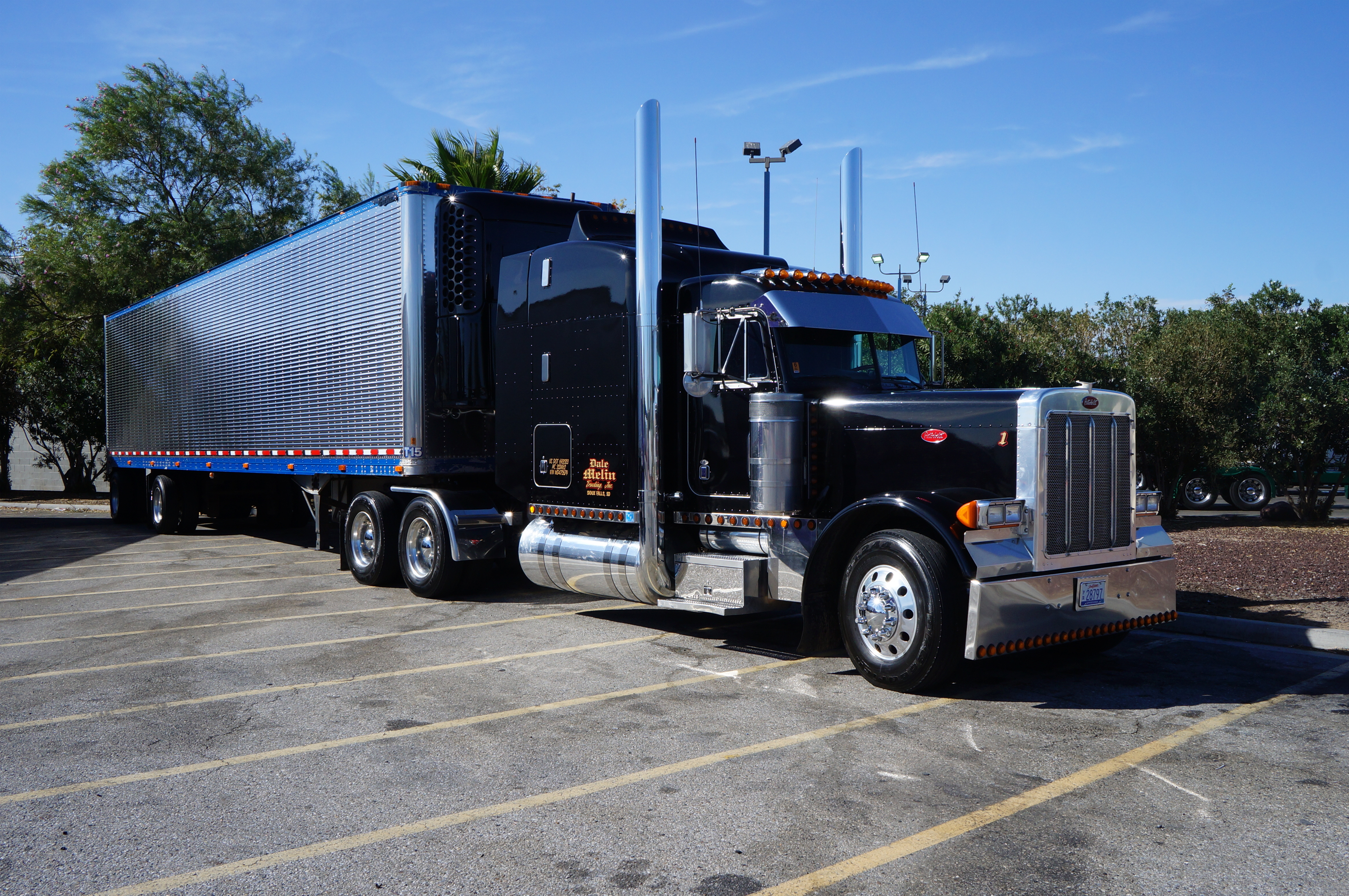
Peterbilt 379

In 1980, the Model 383 was discontinued, largely replaced by the smaller 353 and 387. To expand the vocationally oriented 348/349 model family, a lighter-weight highway tractor (the first Peterbilt highway truck with a sloped nose) was added to the model line; the 349H was offered with a straight hood. In 1980, Peterbilt introduced the Model 397; the largest vehicle ever designed by the company, the 397 conventional 6x6 was exclusively for off-road use. Only 2 397s were assembled, one in 1980 and one in 1982. Peterbilt opened its third manufacturing facility in the United States, located in Denton, Texas, in the northern Dallas-Fort Worth suburbs; the company opened an 80-acre, 435,000 square-foot assembly facility.

In 1981, the Madison facility began assembly of the Model 362 COE. Replacing the 352H, the 362 was the first completely new COE from Peterbilt in 22 years. Distinguished by its curved 3-piece windshield and three windshield wipers (a 4-piece/2-wiper configuration was optional), the 362 was designed with a larger, more aerodynamic cab and a larger, more functional interior. Several axle configurations were offered, including set-back front axles, twin-steer configurations, and all-wheel drive. In total, six cab configurations were offered, ranging from 54 to 110 inches in length.

In 1986, Peterbilt commenced a series of massive changes within both the company and its product line. After 26 years, assembly operations ended at the Newark facility, as the company began production consolidation in Denton; at the time, Newark retained its corporate headquarters and engineering operations. Commencing a transition of the entire Peterbilt model line, the company revised its vocational lineup, as the 378 replaced the 348/349 and the 357 served as a successor to the 353. While trailing other manufacturers by several years, Peterbilt began offering raised-roof sleeper cabs as an option for the 359.

For 1987, the company introduced two different conventional highway tractors, the Model 377 and the Model 379. While more conservative than the design of the Kenworth T600, the 377 used a sloped hood (angled further than the 348/349), a standard set-back front axle, and a wraparound front bumper integrated with the front fenders (later including composite-lens headlamps). Replacing the long-running 359, the 379 served as the standard Class 8 highway tractor; sharing the 1100-series cab with the 359, the 379 was distinguished by its redesigned headlamp clusters and horizontally mounted windshield wipers (also used on the 377). The Model 310 was redesigned, becoming the Model 320; no longer shared with Kenworth, the 320 allowed the driver to drive in a standing position. For the first time, Peterbilt entered the medium-duty (Class 5-7) market, introducing the Mid-Ranger low-cab COE. Produced in Brazil using a MAN G90 cab (a wider version of the Volkswagen LT), the Mid-Ranger was fitted with American drivetrain components; PACCAR marketed the vehicle through both Kenworth and Peterbilt.

In 1988, Peterbilt introduced a second Class 8 COE, the Model 372 aerodynamically enhanced highway tractor. Sharing its doors and internal structure with the 362, the 372 was rebodied to maximize both aerodynamics and fuel economy; the three-piece windshield was replaced by a pointed-center design. Designed as part of the cab, the roof fairing extended forward of the windshield; below the windshield, an upward-tilting shroud included the grille. While the 372 did not use a set-back front axle, the design included a wraparound front bumper; skirted body sides were available as an option. Despite its COE configuration (overcoming an inherently massive frontal area), the aerodynamic enhancements of the 372 achieved over 11mpg in real-world testing.

=== 1990s ===
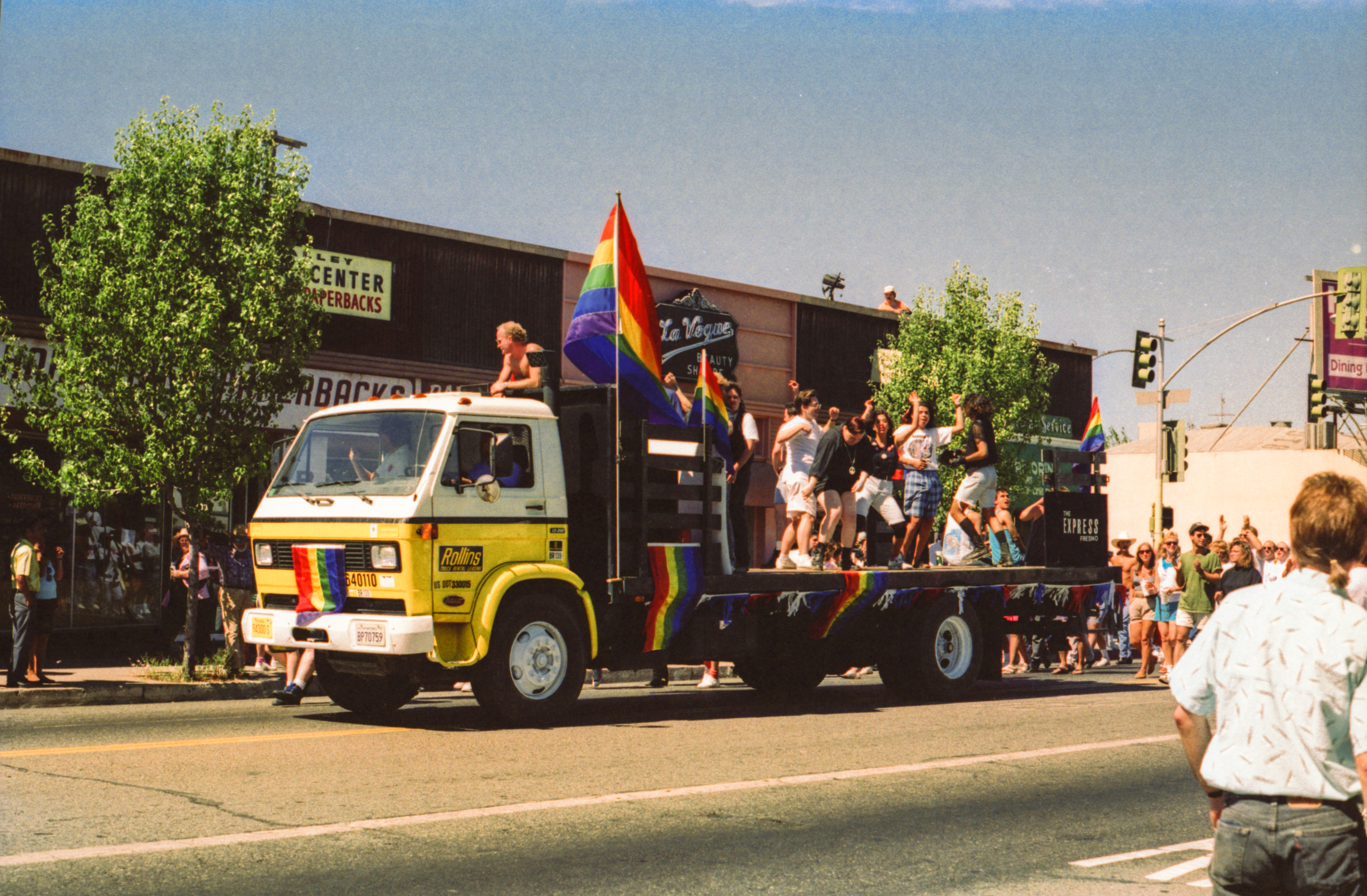
Peterbilt 200 Mid-Ranger COE

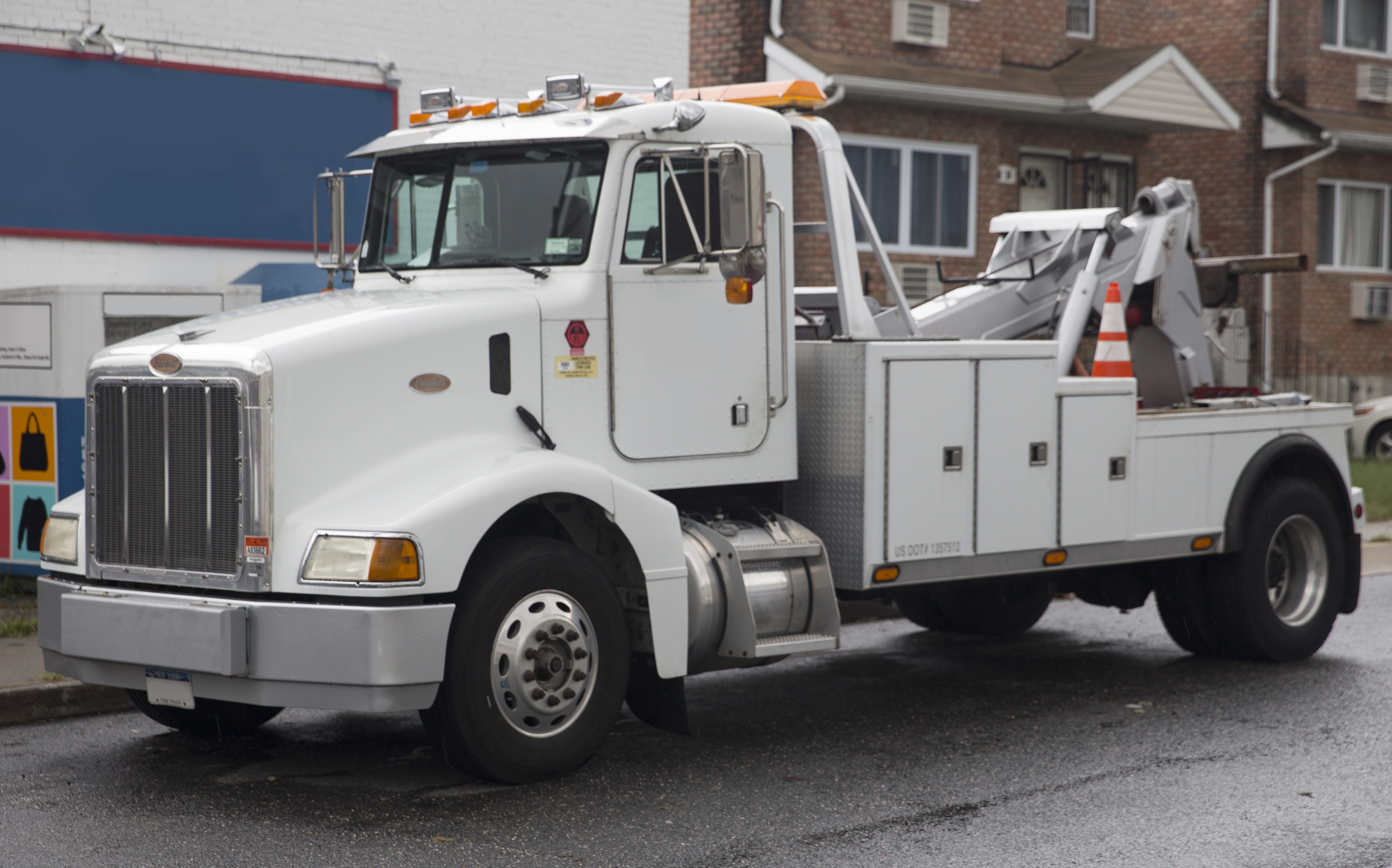
Peterbilt 385 (short-hood 377)

In 1993, Peterbilt ended all operations in Newark, relocating its corporate and engineering headquarters to Denton (alongside its primary manufacturing operations). Coinciding with the consolidation, the company expanded production at the Denton facility.

In 1994, the Model 372 COE ended production, with Peterbilt focusing production on the more mainstream 362. Alongside declining overall demand for COEs, the controversial exterior design of the 372 had seen a poor market response, earning nicknames "football helmet" or "Darth Vader" (among less appropriate ones).

In 1996, the company closed Peterbilt Canada; the Sainte-Thérèse facility had been plagued by multiple strikes and struggled with efficiency (in comparison to the Denton and Madison facilities). In 1997, PACCAR chose to redevelop its Canadian operations, demolishing the facility in 1997 to rebuild an all-new assembly facility in 1999. The Model 385 was introduced as a shorter-length version of the 377; a 112-inch and 120-inch version were offered, the latter eventually replacing the 377.

In 1998, Peterbilt introduced the Model 210/220 COE, a medium-duty (class 6-7) low-cab COE. Replacing the Mid-Ranger, the 210/220 was derived from the DAF LF (coinciding with the PACCAR acquisition of Dutch manufacturer DAF); as with the Mid-Ranger, the design was adapted to an American-sourced powertrain.

In 1999, the Model 387 was introduced, serving as the indirect successor to the 377 (alongside the 385). Completely unrelated to the namesake 1976-1987 heavy-duty truck, the 1999 387 was an aerodynamically enhanced highway tractor. Sharing its cab structure with the Kenworth T2000 (the first all-new cab design since 1972), the 387 used its own chassis and hood design.

=== 2000s ===
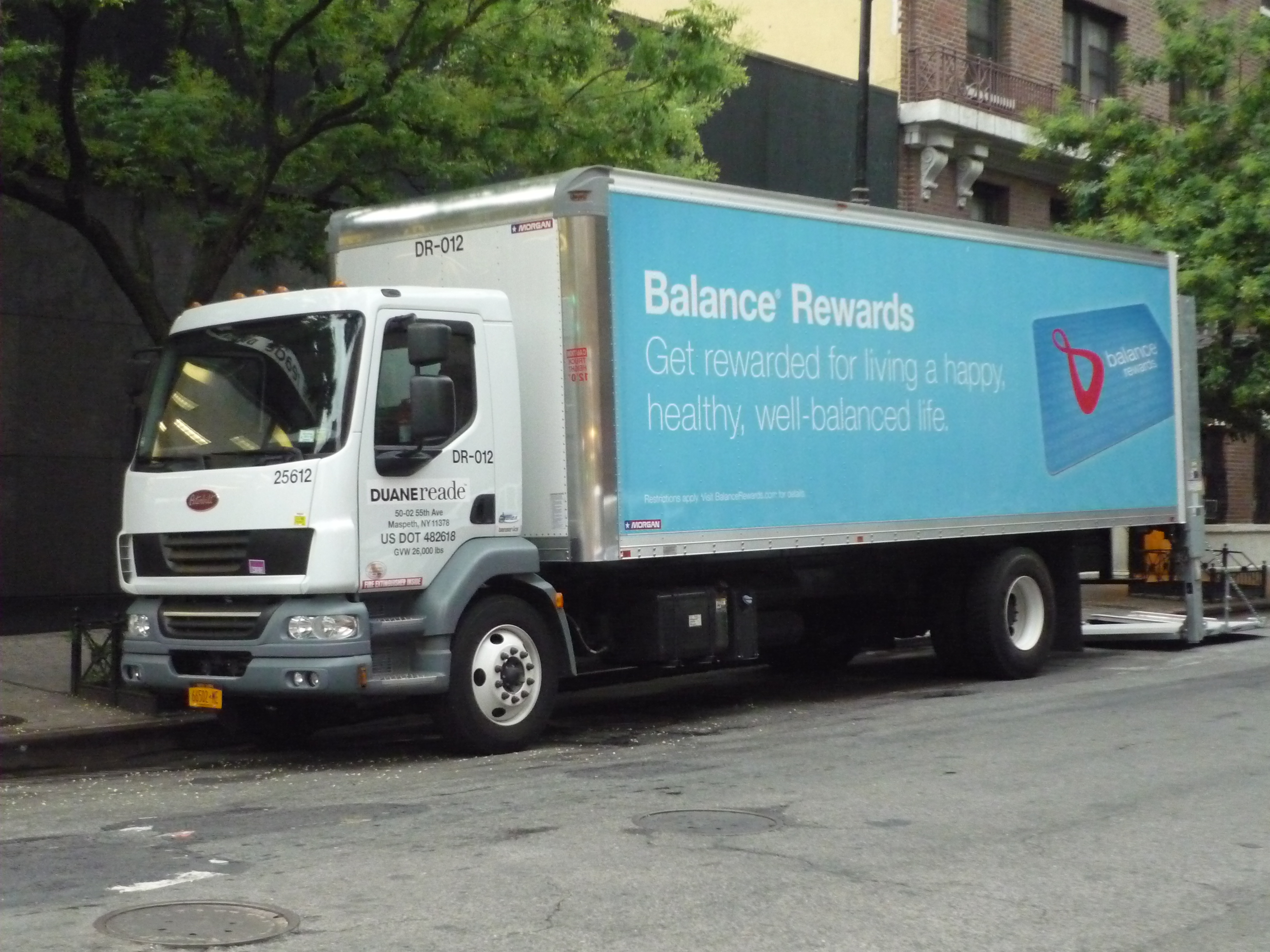
Peterbilt 210 (first generation)

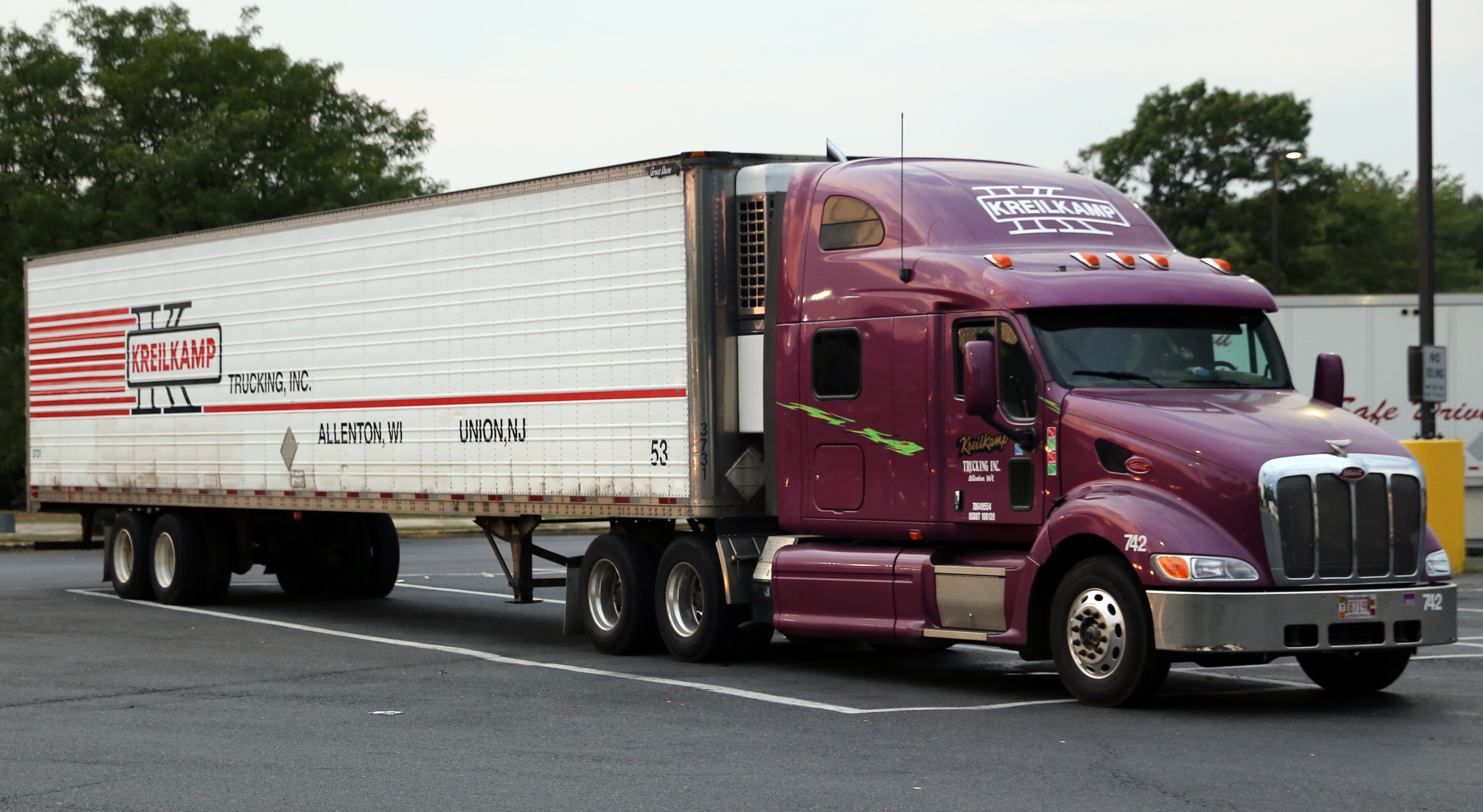
Peterbilt 387

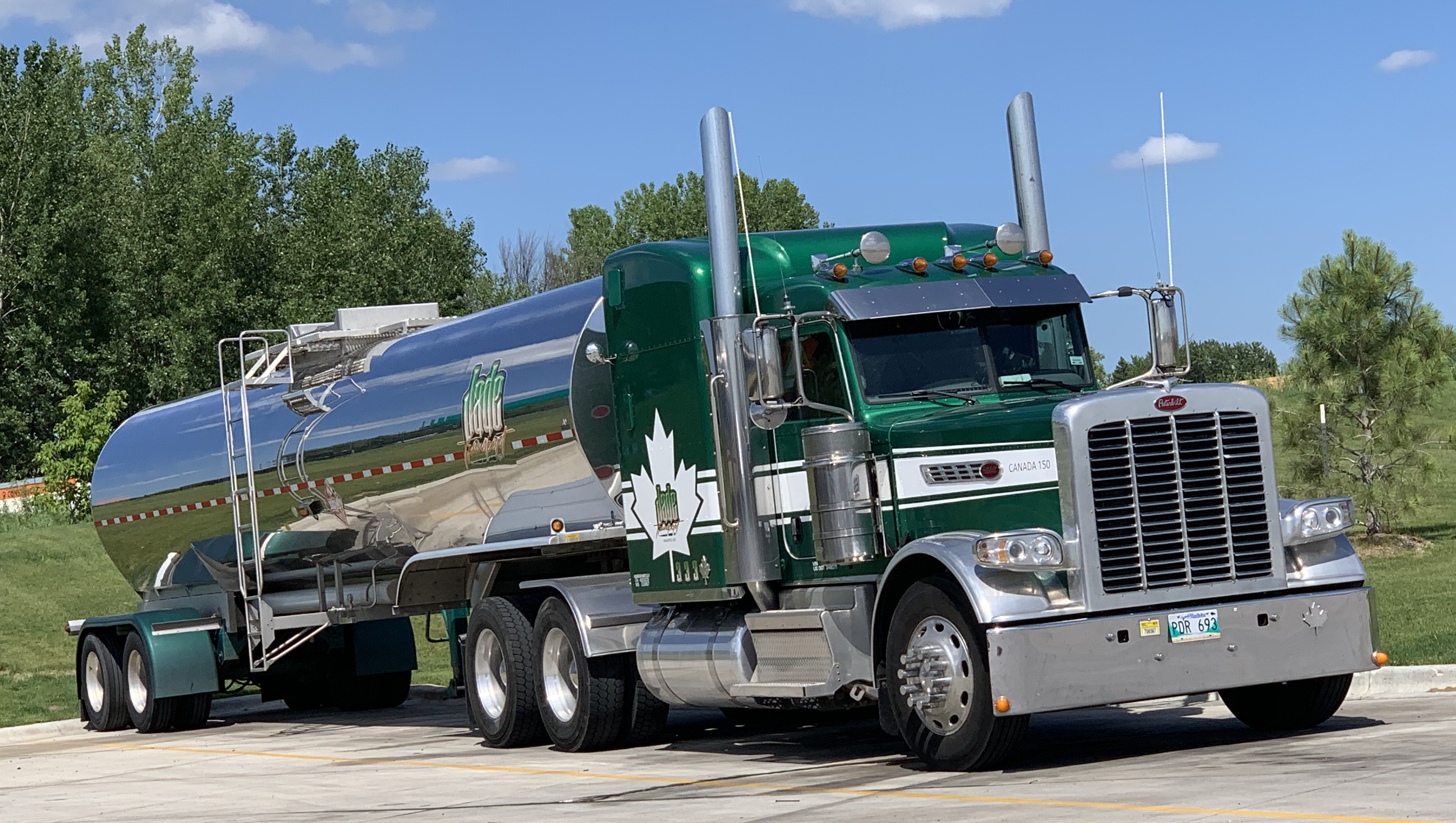
Peterbilt 389

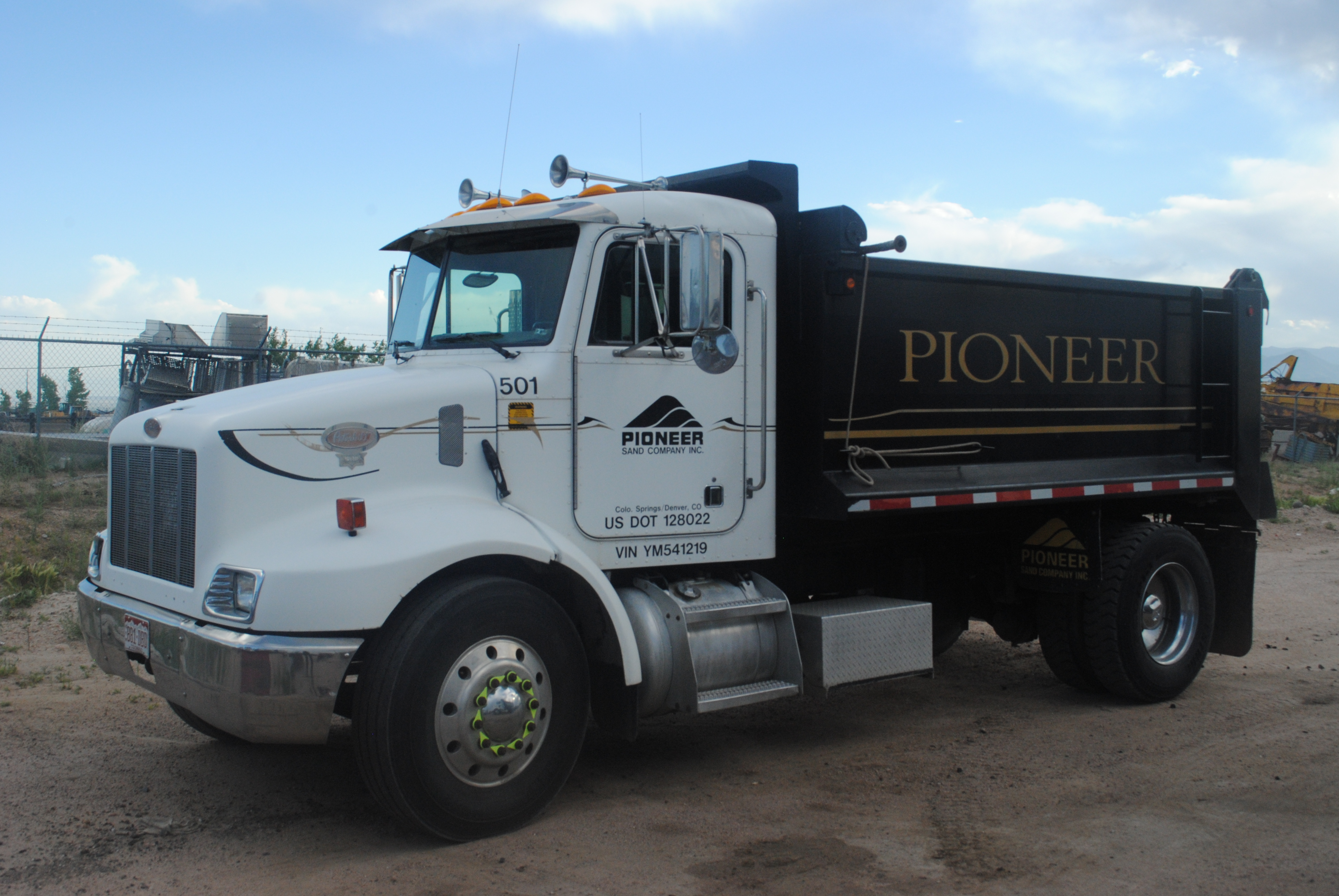
Peterbilt 330 (pre-facelift)

In 2000, Peterbilt introduced the Model 330, its first medium-duty conventional-cab truck. Manufactured by the all-new facility in Sainte-Thérèse, the 330 used the 1100-series cab of the Class 8 conventionals with an all-new hood (distinguished by integrated twin headlamps). During 2000, the 377 ended production, effectively replaced by the 120-inch 385 and the 387.

In 2002, to accommodate increased demand, the company temporarily added production of the 357, 378, 385 vocational trucks and the 379 to Sainte-Thérèse.

In 2005, the Model 362 ended production; following years of declining sales of COEs, the 362 became the final cabover model line sold in North America (leaving only the Freightliner Argosy, itself ending North American sales a year later). As a running change during 2005 production, the doors of the 1100-series cab were revised; distinguished with the deletion of the vent windows and redesigned door handles, the side window brackets were redesigned and relocated from the door to the body. As a more direct successor to the 377, the Model 386 combined the aerodynamic hood of the 387 with the traditional 1100-series cab. The Model 335 was introduced as a second medium-duty conventional; sized in the Class 6-7 range, the 335 introduced a scaled-down version of the hood from the 386.

In 2006, the medium-duty product line was expanded further. Alongside the Class 7 Model 340, Peterbilt introduced its smallest-ever conventional, the Class 5 Model 325 (the latter, not requiring a CDL to operate). The same year, the company released its first diesel-electric hybrid vehicle, introducing 330 and 335 hybrids. Serving as the successor to the 357 and 378, the 365 and 367 were introduced, serving as heavy-duty Class 8 trucks; along with vocationally oriented configurations, the model line is also offered as a tractor.

In 2007, the company withdrew the 210/220 medium-duty COEs, as second-party equipment manufacturers found difficulties adapting to its European-based design. After a 20-year production run, the Model 379 was retired, replaced by the Model 389. Sharing its cab with the 2005-2007 379, the 389 was designed with a longer hood (the longest-ever Peterbilt conventional), upgraded headlamps, and aerodynamic improvements.

In 2009, Peterbilt ended production at the Madison, Tennessee facility, consolidating operations between Denton and Sainte-Thérèse. The medium-duty line saw a slight revision; along with adoption of (Cummins-built) PACCAR engines and a redesigned interior, the 335 and 340 were dropped, replaced by the 337 and 348.

=== 2010s ===
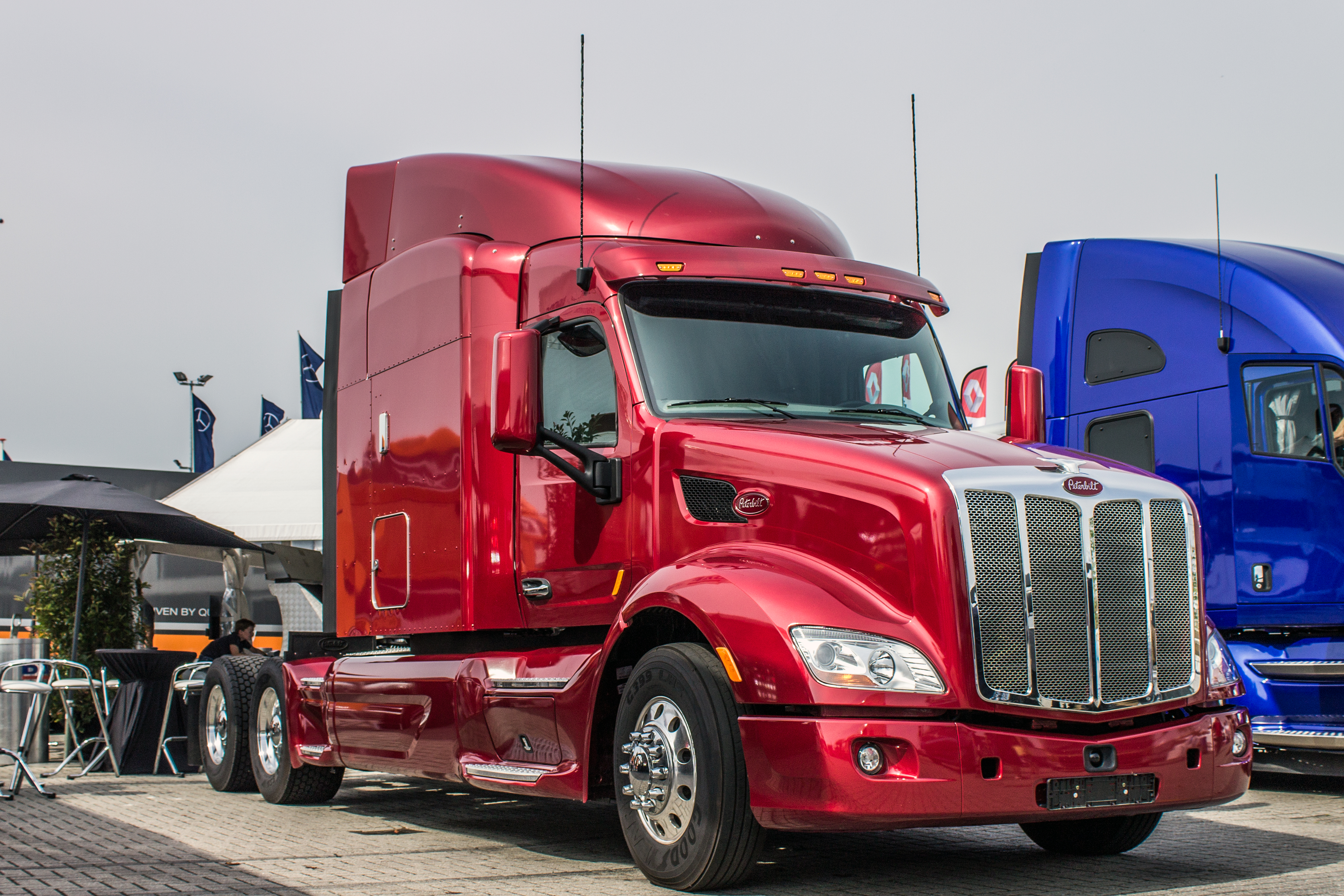
Peterbilt 579

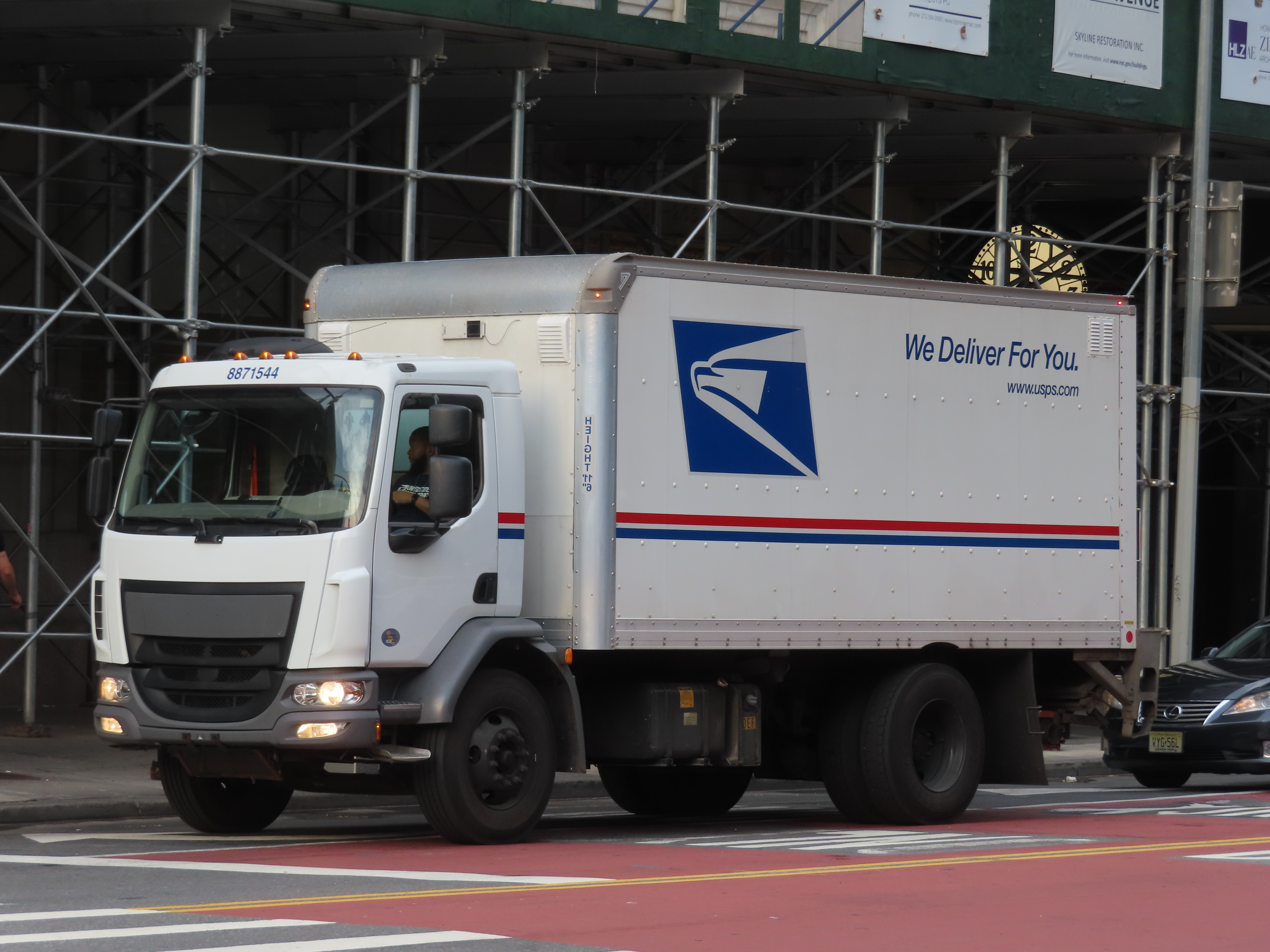
Peterbilt 220 (second generation)

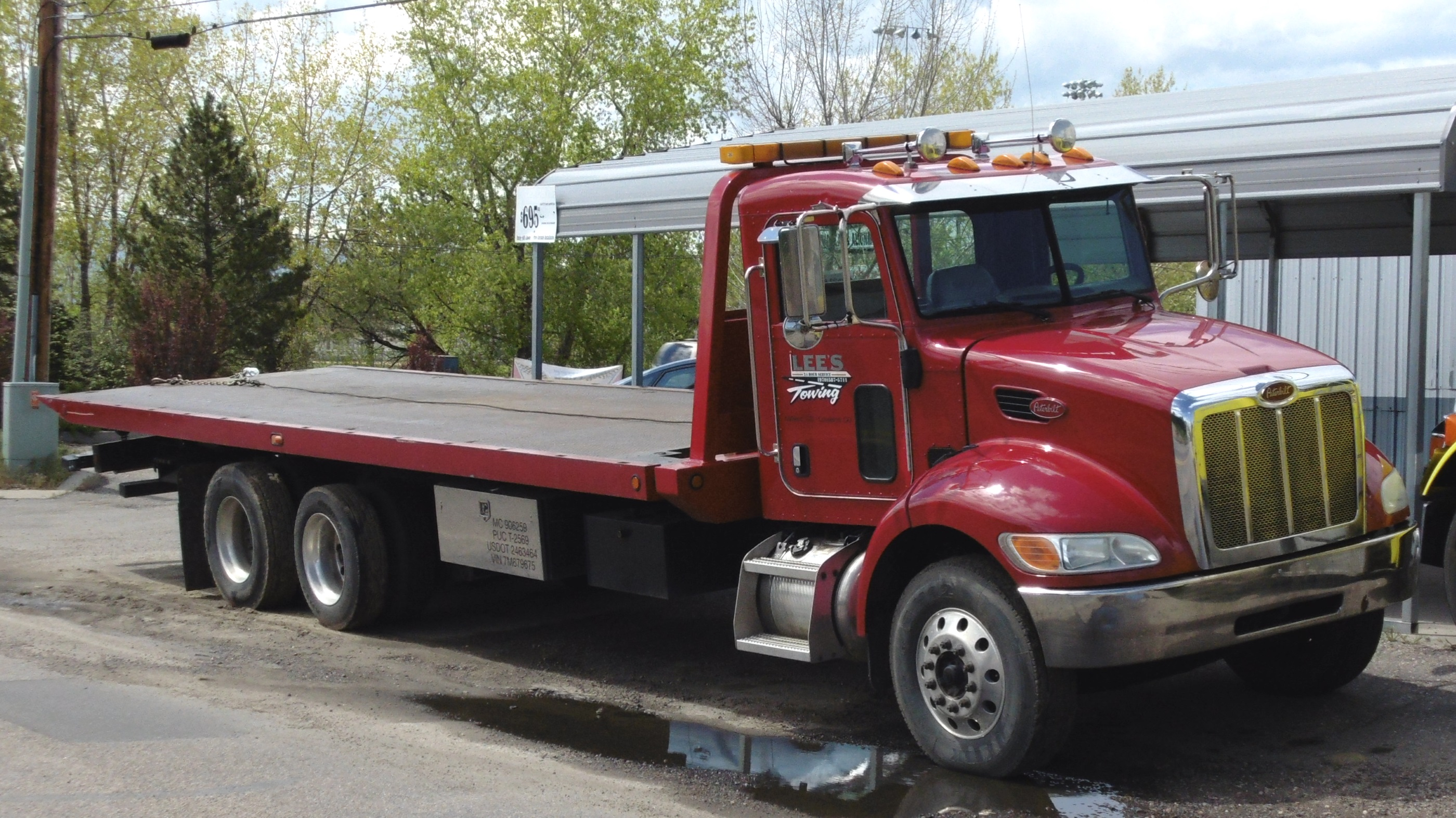
Peterbilt 335

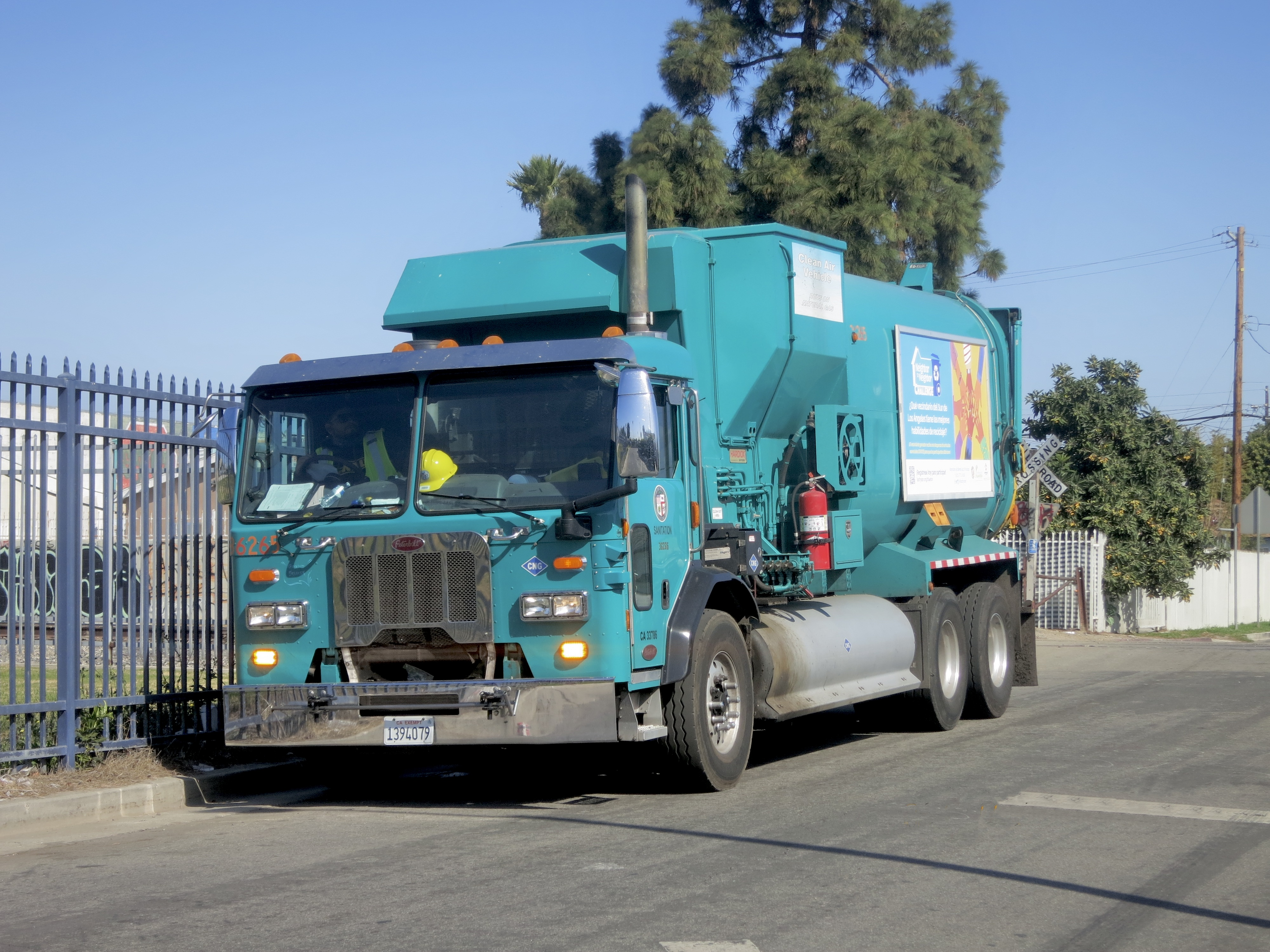
Peterbilt 320 LA Sanitation trash truck

In 2010, the Model 587 was introduced as a wide-cab aerodynamic tractor, serving as the successor of the 387. Sharing its cab structure with the Kenworth T700, the 587 (the first Peterbilt with a "5" model designation) adopted a sharper-edged hood from its predecessor, achieving improvements in aerodynamics, forward visibility, and lighting. The Model 382 was introduced as a regional-haul daycab tractor, serving as a shorter/lighter version of the 386/384.

In 2011, the Model 210 and 220 COEs made their return. Assembled in the PACCAR facility in Mexicali, Mexico (alongside the Model 320), the 210/220 now used the chassis of the 325 and 330 (only sourcing the cab assembly with the DAF LF), allowing for increased mechanical commonality and simpler adaption of equipment. As before, the model was shared with Kenworth as the K270/K370. The company introduced a design variant of the Class 8 1100-series cab, introducing an "Extended Ultra Daycab" for non-sleeper; the option included a raised roof and extended rear cab wall.

In 2012, the Model 579 was introduced as the Peterbilt wide-cab aerodynamic tractor. Replacing the 587 (which remained in production), the 579 served as the flagship model line alongside the "traditional" 389. Debuting an all-new cab design (no longer shared with Kenworth), the 579 improved outward visibility (by removing vent windows), further improved aerodynamics (with redesigned body skirting and optimized under-body design), and improved serviceability.

In 2013, the Model 567 was introduced as a Class 8 heavy-duty truck. Sharing its size and functionality with the 367, the 567 adopted the newer cab design of the 579 (fitting it with the headlamps from the 389). Initially offered with a set-back front axle; a set-forward front axle was also introduced in 2015.

In 2014, to commemorate 75 years of production, Peterbilt released a 75th Anniversary Edition of the Model 579, which was painted with a two-tone exterior and a matching interior. The Class 7 Model 220 underwent a redesign (the Class 6 210 was dropped), again mating a DAF LF cab (which underwent a redesign in 2013) to a Peterbilt-sourced cab and drivetrain.

In 2015, the company introduced its first medium-duty trucks fueled by compressed natural gas (CNG), offering it as an option for the 337 and 348. The Model 388 was redesignated, becoming the shorter-length (123-inch) version of the 389.

In 2016, the Model 520 was introduced, replacing the Model 320 after 29 years of production. While nearly visually identical to its predecessor (adding larger windshield wipers and optional LED headlamps), the refuse-collection functionality of the 520 was upgraded, allowing drivers to drive the vehicle sitting or standing from either side of the cab.

In 2018, Peterbilt began testing on its first electric vehicle prototypes, building 12 579s and 3 520s with all-electric powertrains.

=== 2020s ===
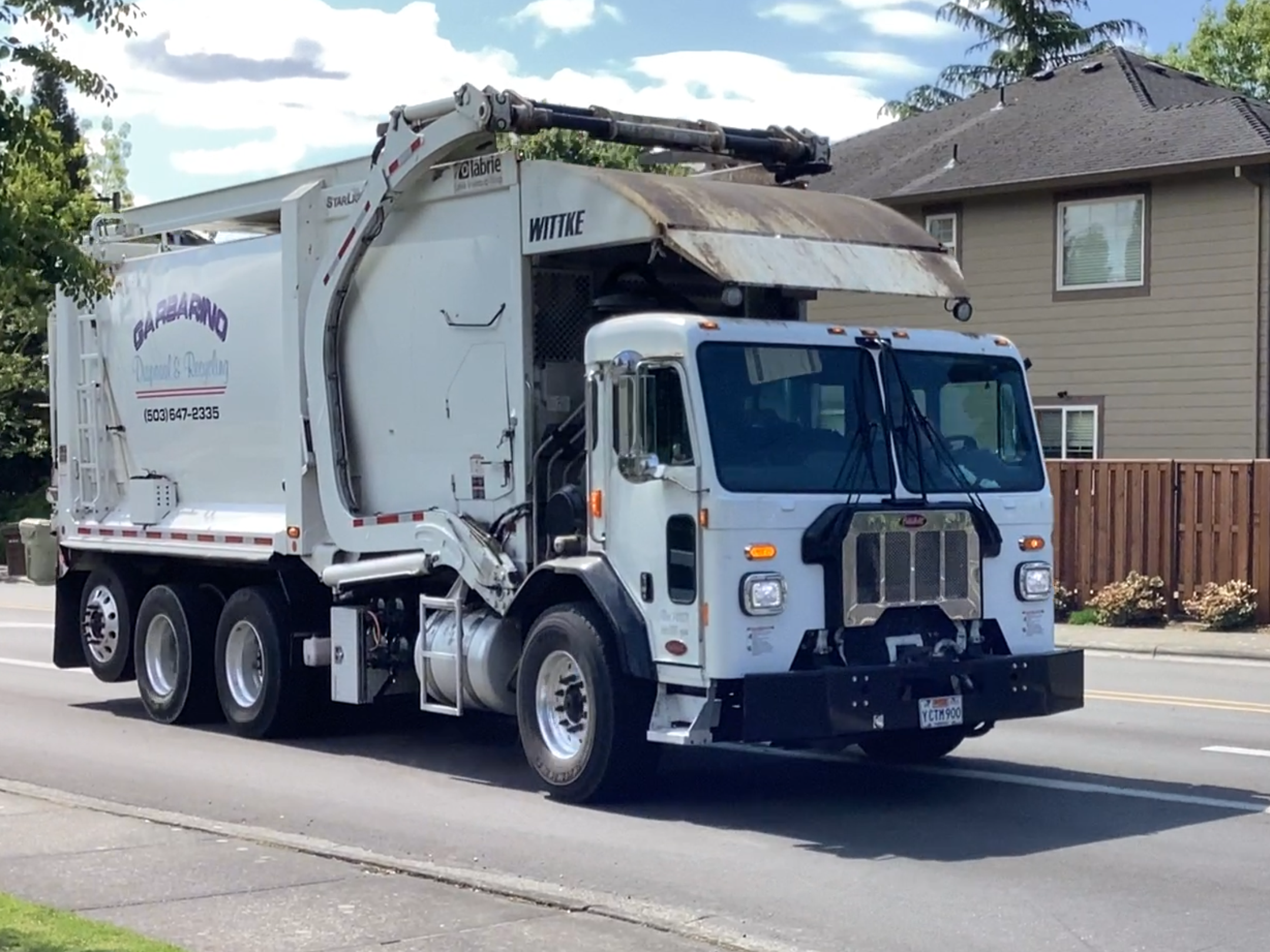
Peterbilt 520 COE

In 2021, Peterbilt commenced production of three all-electric model lines, launching the Class 8 579EV tractor, Class 8 520EV low-cab COE, and the Class 7 220EV COE.

The medium-duty model line underwent a complete redesign, as the 325, 330, 337, and 348 were discontinued. Adopting the larger cab of the 567 and 579, the Class 5-7 Model 535, 536, 537, and 548 also introduced the rebranding of several PACCAR drivetrain and suspension components.

In 2023, the Model 589 flagship conventional was introduced as the successor of the 389. Sharing the same chassis as its predecessor, the 589 adopted the wider 2.1M cab of the 579, 567, and Peterbilt medium-duty trucks. In contrast to the sloped hood of the 567, the 589 retains the flat hood of its predecessor (updated to accommodate the different cab design).

During 2024, Peterbilt produced the final Model 389, ending the 57-year production of the 359/379/389 family and retiring the Peterbilt 300-series altogether (which dated to 1939).

== Models ==
=== Current ===
==== Medium-duty trucks (Class 5-7) ====
- Model 220 COE (Class 7, 2011 – present)
- Model 535 (Class 5, 2021 – present)
- Model 536 (Class 6, 2021 – present)
- Model 537 (Class 7, 2021 – present)
- Model 548 (Class 7, 2021 – present)

==== Heavy trucks (Class 8) ====
- Model 365/367 severe-service/vocational (2006 – present)
- Model 379 conventional extended-hood semitractor (1987-2007)
- Model 389 extended-hood on-highway semitractor (2007 – 2024)
- Model 520 low-cab COE, vocational/refuse (2016 – present)
- Model 567 severe-service/vocational (2013 – present)
- Model 579 aerodynamic-body on-highway semitractor (2012 – present)
- Model 589 extended-hood on-highway semitractor (2024 – present)

== Facilities ==
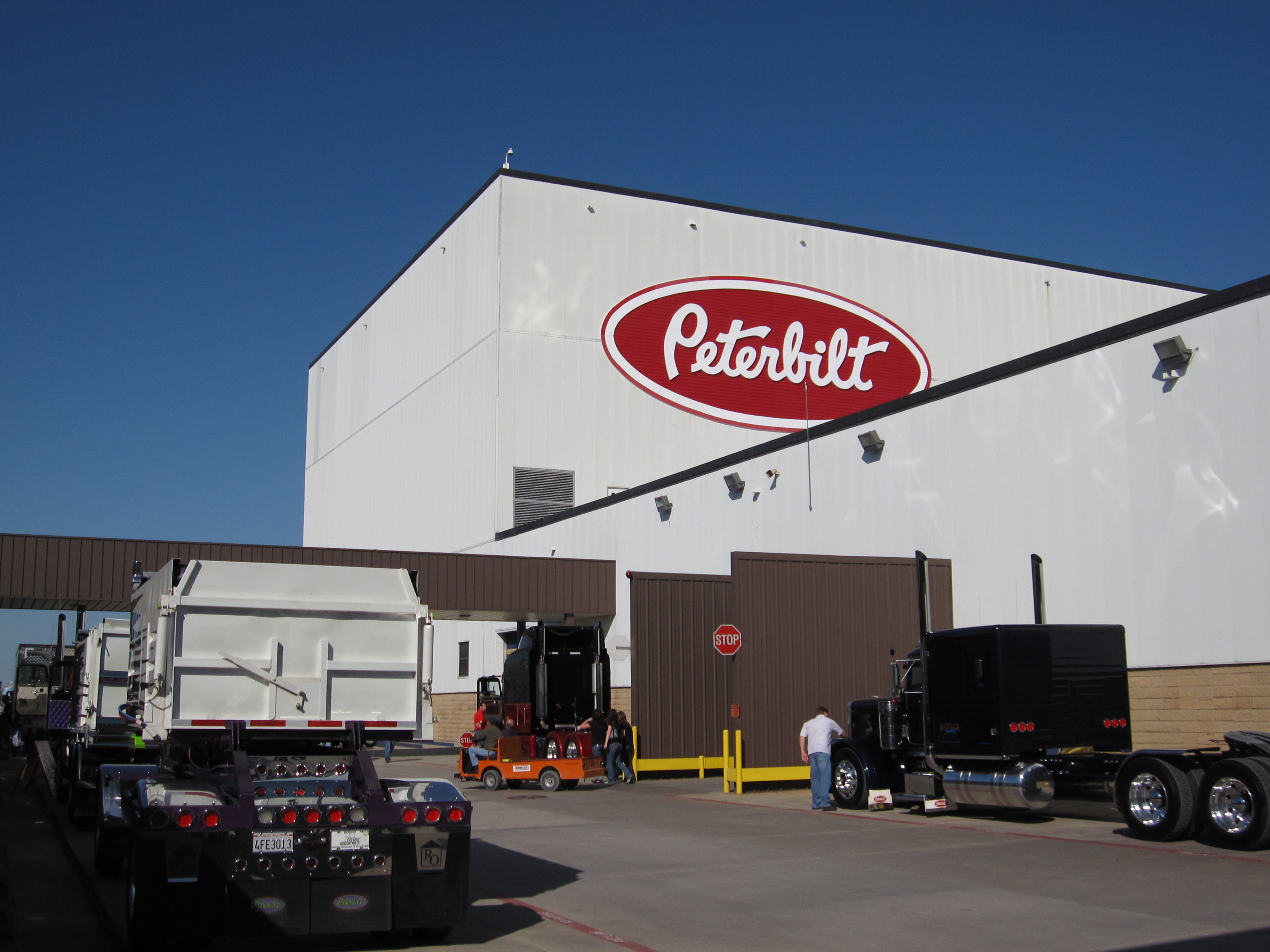
Peterbilt assembly plant and headquarters in Denton, Texas

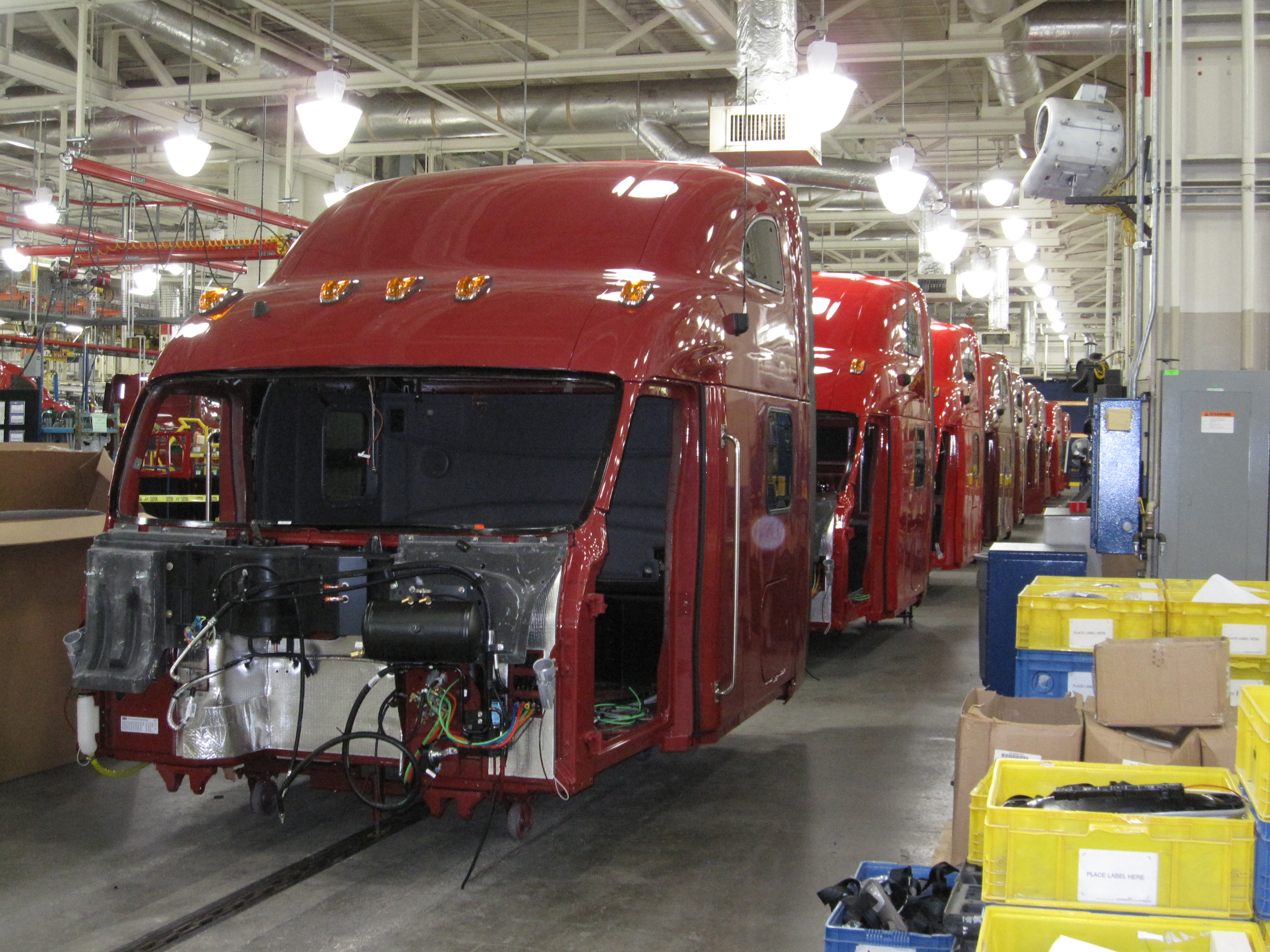
Peterbilt 387 cabs on assembly line

From its 1939 founding to 1960, Peterbilt was based in Oakland, California, using the former Fageol facilities. In 1960, the company was required to relocate, moving to Newark, California. To supplement truck production, the company opened a facility in Madison, Tennessee (suburban Nashville) in 1969. Originally producing the 352/282 COE exclusively, the Madison facility added conventionals during the 1970s; the facility remained open through 2009.

In 1975, the company opened Peterbilt Canada in Sainte-Thérèse, Quebec (part of Greater Montreal), dedicating production to low-cab COE vehicles (primarily for refuse applications). After its closure in 1996, the facility was demolished in 1997 and rebuilt with an all-new facility opened in 1999. Currently, Sainte-Thérèse assembles Peterbilt medium-duty trucks.

In 1980, Peterbilt opened its current facility at Denton, Texas (northern Dallas-Fort Worth suburbs). At the end of 1986, the company closed its Newark facility, shifting production to Denton; corporate and engineering headquarters remained in California through the end of 1992, after which the company consolidated operations in its Denton facility. In 2009, the Madison facility was closed; all Peterbilt Class 8 conventionals are currently manufactured in Denton.

== See also ==
- Paccar
  - Kenworth
  - DAF Trucks
- Freightliner Trucks
- Mack Trucks
- Navistar International
