= Kenworth Renton Plant =

Truck manufacturing plant

- Built: 1993
- Operated: 1993–present
- Location: 1601 North 8th Street; Renton, Washington, United States
- Coordinates: 47°29′38″N 122°11′52″W
- Industry: Automotive
- Products: trucks
- Employees: 560
- Area: 40 acres (16 ha)
- Volume: 300,000 square feet (28,000 m^{2})
- Owner: Kenworth (Paccar)

Kenworth Renton Plant is a Kenworth truck manufacturing plant in Renton, Washington, owned by Paccar. The plant employs approximately 560 workers, and builds about 15 specialized, high-content heavy-duty trucks per day.

== History ==
The plant was opened on June 4, 1993, as Kenworth's third, 300,000-square-foot truck manufacturing plant on a 40-acre site, with the first truck, a Kenworth T600B AeroCab 60-inch Sleeper, rolling off the assembly line and delivered to Stevens Transport.

In 1996, three years after the Kenworth Renton Plant opened its doors, the old, 13-acre Kenworth assembly plant on East Marginal Way in South Seattle ceased primary truck manufacturing due to a 25% drop in industry wide truck sales, and was sold at a three-day public auction on September 24, 2002.

In March 2000, Kenworth announced it will lay off about 401 workers (351 hourly and 50 salaried) at the Renton plant by April of the same year due to an industry-wide sales slowdown. Two years later in October 2002, the company also laid off more than 260 workers at the plant due to a slump in fourth-quarter truck orders following a pre-emission-deadline buying surge.

On November 30, 2001, serial killer Gary Ridgway was employed in the plant's paint department at the time he was arrested, with paint evidence later tied to the investigation. In 2005, the plant produced the historic 700,000th Kenworth truck in company history.

On November 27, 2006, Kenworth announced it was cutting a second shift and laying off 400 workers at the plant by January 3, 2007 due to a softening market and new federal emissions regulations. Three months later afters the layoffs occurred in January of the same year, Kenworth laid off another 140 assembly and maintenance workers on April 3, 2007, and idled production from April 4 to 17 due to slumping sales.

On November 14, 2008, Kenworth announced it would lay off 430 workers (329 union workers and 92 management/non-bargaining employees) at the plant by mid-January 2009 due to the worsening national economy. It also shifted conventional Class 8 heavy-duty highway truck production from its plant in Renton, Washington, to its facility in Chillicothe, Ohio.

In 2011, the plant ramped up production and increased its workforce as demand for heavy-duty commercial vehicles rebounded.

== Products made ==
- Kenworth T600 (1993–present)
- Kenworth W900 (1993–present)
- Kenowrth C500
- Kenworth T680
- Kenworth T880

== Awards ==
In 2000, Fortune magazine recognized the Kenworth truck plant in Renton as one of "America's Elite Factories" for its high manufacturing standards and efficiency. The plant also won Assembly Magazine's first "Assembly Plant of the Year Award" in 2004.
