= T700 =

T700 may refer to:

- General Electric T700, a family of turboshaft and turboprop engines
- Sony Ericsson T700, a mid-range mobile phone
- T-700, a fictional robot from Terminator series
- Tatra 700, a Czech car
- a discontinued Kenworth heavy-duty truck
