= List of Kenworth vehicles =

This is a list of vehicles made by Kenworth.

== Conventional ==
Exterior	Model	Model Years	Class	Vehicle information
Current (North America)
	W900	1961–present	8	Kenworth's long running semi truck model. The W900B replaced the A model in late 1982. The W900L arrived in 1990. It is also made as a straight dump truck besides its normal usage as a long-haul semi truck
	W990	2019–present	8	Classic-styled truck. Shares cab with T680 and T880. It is also made as a straight dump truck besides its normal usage as a long-haul semi truck
	T800	1987–present	8	Kenworth's vocational and severe duty truck, available in both semi or rigid configurations. Shares cab with W900. Most commonly found as a dump truck or heavy haul semi truck
	T880	2014–present	8	Modernized variant of the T800, most commonly found as a dump truck or heavy haul semi truck
	T680	2013–present	8	Replacement for both T660 and T700, Kenworth's main aerodynamic semi truck. Second generation introduced in 2022.
	T380; T480	2021–present	7 and 8	Medium duty and light vocational. Replaced T370 and T470.
	T180/T280	2021–present	5 to 7	Medium duty, replaced T170 and T270.
Discontinued (North America)
	T2000	1997–2010	8	Completely new wide body cab design, shares some parts with the Peterbilt 387.
	T700	2011–2014	8	Direct replacement to the T2000, shares cab structure with Peterbilt 587.
	T660	2008–2017	8	Replacement for T600, Was produced in Mexico until 2020.
	T600	1985–2007	8	Class 8 tractor, greatly increased fuel economy due to revolutionary aerodynamic design.
	T400; T450	1988–c.1997 1989–c.1997	8	Light vocational
	T300	1995–2007	7 and 8	Medium duty (2008 started the T370)
	T440; T470	2011–2021; 2010–2021	7 and 8	Light vocational, replaced T400 series.
	T170/T270/T370	2008–2021	5 to 7	Medium duty, replaced T100 thru T300.

== Cabover ==
Exterior	Model	Model Years	Class	Vehicle information
Current (North America)
	K270/K370	2013–present	7 and 6	Known in Mexico as KW 45 and 55.
Discontinued (North America)
	K360/K260	2008–2012	7 and 6	Uses DAF LF45 cab. Known in Mexico as KW 45 and 55 (2004–2012).
	K300	2000–2004	7 and 6	Uses DAF 45 cab.
	13-210/22-210; K130/K220/K300	1987–1999	7	Also known as Mid-Ranger series of trucks, uses VW cab.
	PD; Hustler; L700	1971; 1972–c.1977 1978–c.1985	7	
	K100	1963–2004	8	Kenworth's main cabover semi for 40 years. Two major revisions in its lifetime, the K100C in 1972, and the K100E in late 1984.

== Off-highway ==
Exterior	Model	Model Years	Class	Vehicle information
Current (North America)
	C500	1972–1987		Only for the most extreme conditions
	953	1958-2005		Off-Road/Oil Fields
	963	2005-Present		Off Road/Oil Fields

== Gallery ==
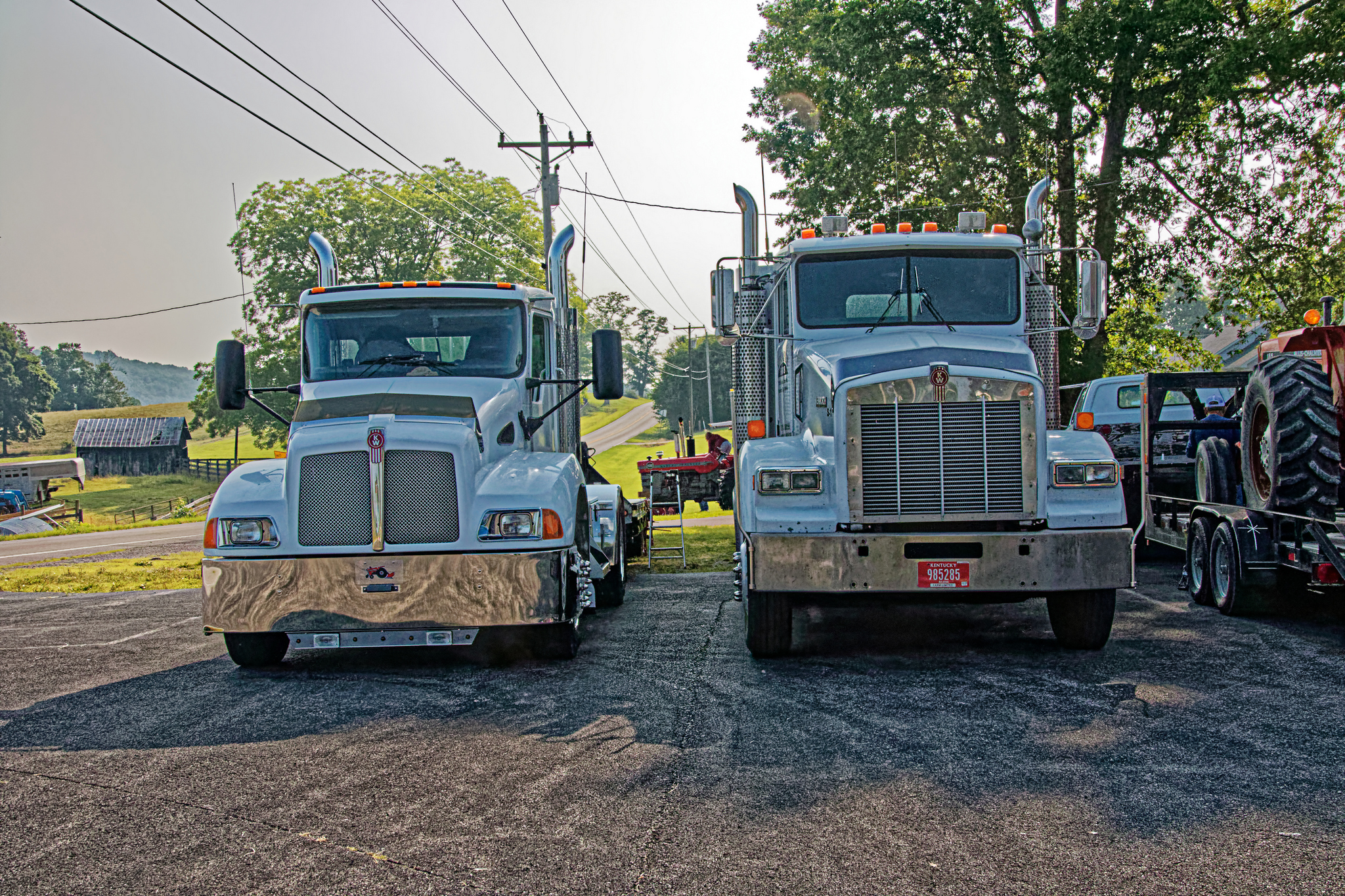
Two Kenworths - T300 (Left) and T800 (Right)

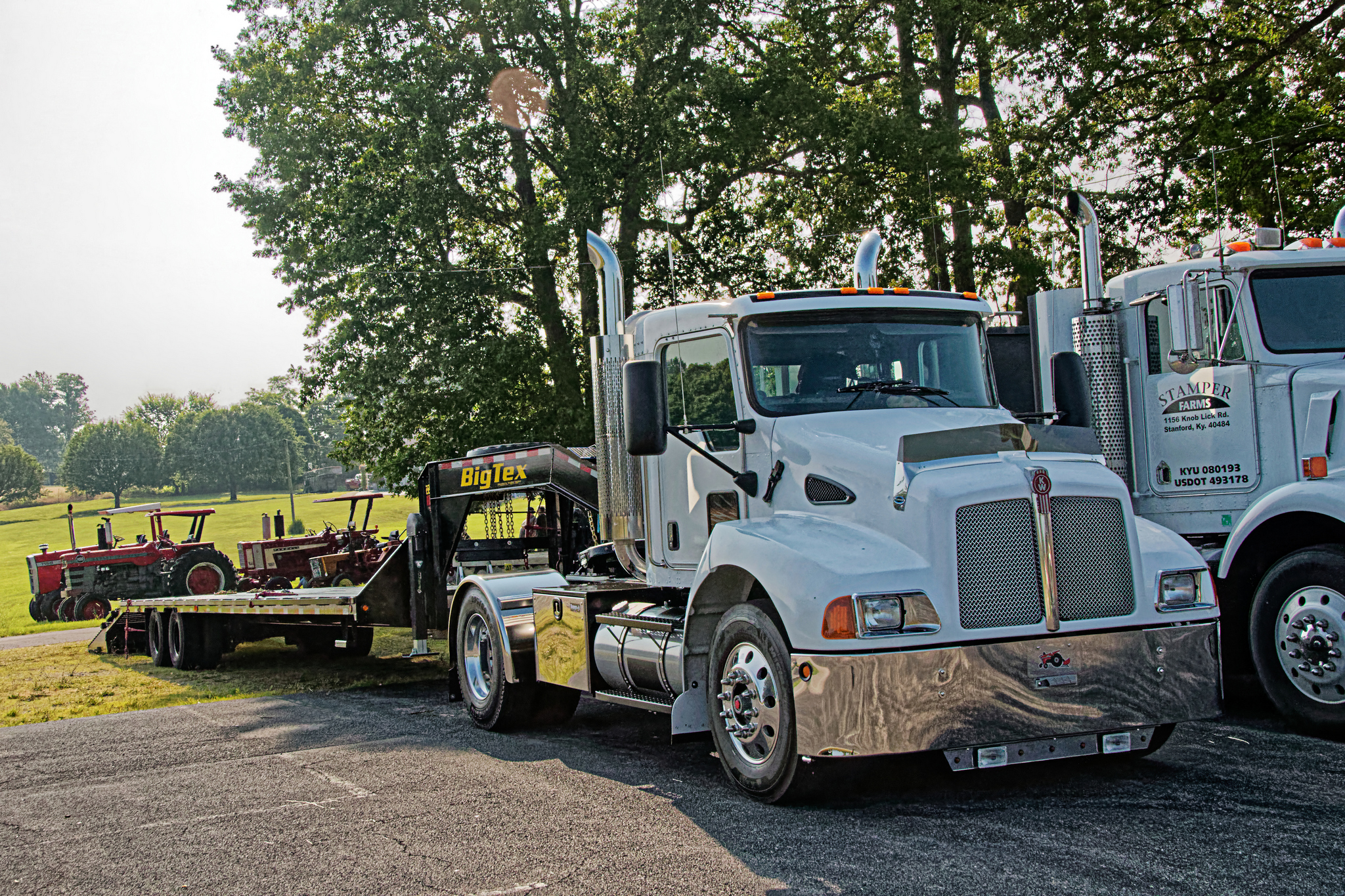
Kenworth T300

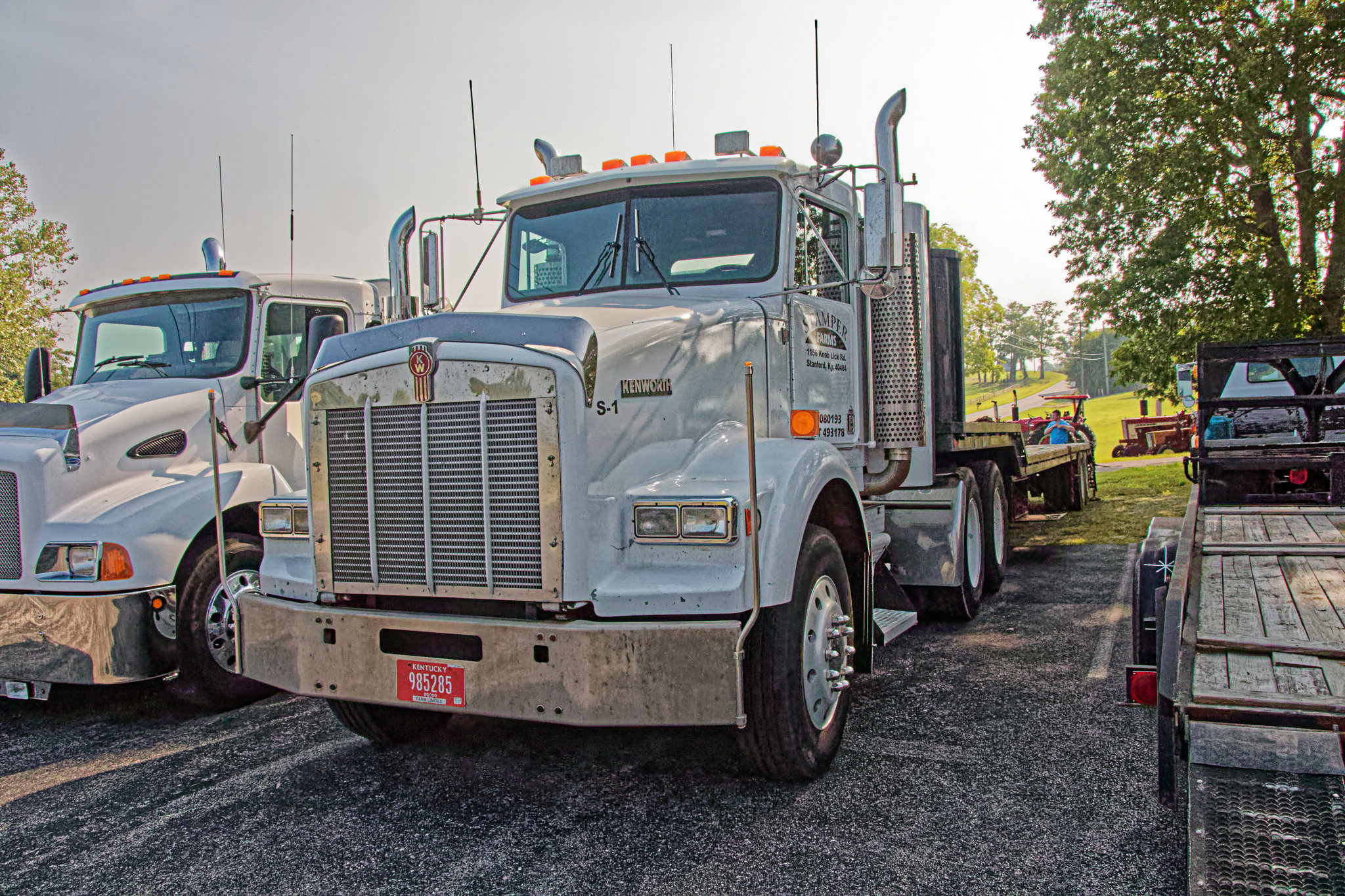
Kenworth T800
