= Sony Ericsson T650 =

Mobile phone model

Sony Ericsson T650i
- Manufacturer: Sony Ericsson
- Availability by region: 2007
- Predecessor: Sony Ericsson T630
- Successor: Sony Ericsson T700; Sony Ericsson T707
- Compatible networks: GSM 900/1800/1900 and UMTS 2100
- Dimensions: 104 mm × 46 mm × 12.5 mm (4.09 in × 1.81 in × 0.49 in)
- Weight: 95 g (3.4 oz)
- Memory: 16 MB Internal; Memory Stick Micro M2 (expandable up to 2 GB)
- Battery: Standard battery, Li-Po 930 mAh (BST-38)
- Rear camera: 3.15 MP, 2048x1536 pixels, autofocus, video(QCIF), flash; secondary VGA videocall
- Display: 240x320 pixels (QVGA), 1.9 inches, 262,144 (18-bit) color TFT LCD
- Connectivity: WCDMA, GPRS, Bluetooth, USB 2.0

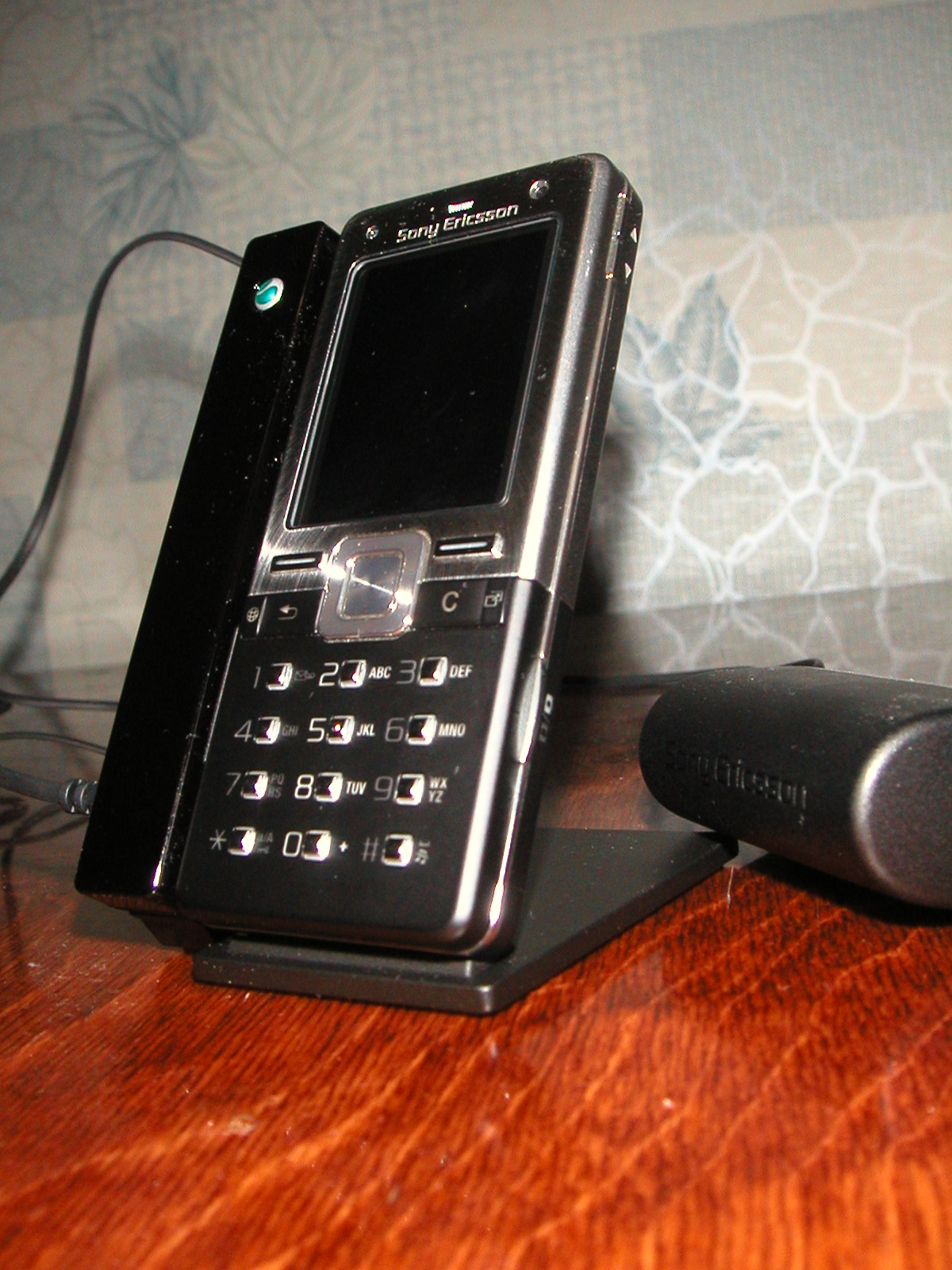
Sony Ericsson T650i on desk stand

The Sony Ericsson T650i is a mobile phone that was announced in May 2007. The T650i, along with the T250i, were a revival of the T series Sony Ericsson phones. The T series marked the debut of Sony and Ericsson's partnership with the Sony Ericsson T68i.

The T650i was available in four different colour schemes; "Growing Green", "Midnight Blue", "Eclipse Black" and "Precious Gold". There was also a version of the phone for China Mainland; the Sony Ericsson T650c.

== Features ==
The T650 features a 3.2 megapixel camera (with autofocus & flash) and a secondary VGA camera located on the front which can be used for 3G video conferencing. The phone also features a MP3/AAC music player, a MP4/3GP/3GPP video player, and an FM radio. The phone comes with 16 MB of internal memory and a 256 MB Memory Stick Micro, but can be expanded to 2 GB via the Memory Stick Micro slot. The phone features flash themes which change depending on the time of day. Other features include multitasking, photo/video editing, picture blogging and web gallery uploading, QCIF video recording, stereo Bluetooth, and 3G data transferring capabilities of up to 384 kbit/s.

== Included in Box ==
The retail box of the T650i includes various accessories: a desk stand, a stereo headset, a pouch, a USB cable, a 256MB Memory Stick Micro, and PC software, along with a charge cable and the battery.
