= Kenworth Chillicothe Plant =

- Operated: 1974–present
- Location: 65 Kenworth Drive; Chillicothe, Ohio, United States
- Coordinates: 39°23′51″N 82°57′34″W
- Industry: Automotive
- Products: trucks
- Employees: 2,500
- Area: 120 acres (49 ha)
- Volume: 622,000 square feet (57,800 m^{2})
- Owner: Kenworth (Paccar)

Kenworth Chillicothe Plant is a Kenworth truck manufacturing plant in Chillicothe, Ohio, owned by Paccar. The plant has built more than 782,000 trucks over its history.

== History ==
The plant was opened on March 4, 1974, with the first truck, a Kenworth W900, rolling off the assembly line the following day. Two years later after its opening, the plant supported production alongside the introduction of Kenworth's raised-roof Aerodyne sleeper cab.

In 1985, the plant began manufacturing the groundbreaking Kenworth T600, widely recognized as the industry's first aerodynamic long-haul truck.

In September 2000, the plant laid off 500 workers (about 31% of its 1,600-person workforce) due to a glut in the used truck market and rising fuel costs. The plant issued another round of layoffs affecting 135 workers effective February 26, 2001, as heavy-duty truck sales continued to slump. Kenworth laid off 450 temporary workers at the plant on October 25, 2002.

In March 2007, PACCAR (Kenworth's parent company) temporarily halted some production and trimmed shifts at the Chillicothe factory due to a delay in engine deliveries following new EPA emissions regulations.

In 2010, the Chillicothe facility launched production of the Kenworth's new aerodynamic T700 truck. Boosted by recovering market demand and new vehicle rollouts, the plant reached a record capacity of 150 trucks per day by 2011.

In April 2012, the plant laid off 10% of its workforce (affecting roughly 200 to 250 employees) due to a drop in heavy-duty truck orders linked to financial troubles in the European Union.

The plant celebrated its 50th anniversary on March 4, 2024, having produced over 782,000 trucks since opening in 1974. The company broke ground on an $89 million, 45,825-square-foot expansion in late 2024 for a state-of-the-art chassis paint system, which was opened in early 2026. The plant also held the fifth annual Kenworth Truck Parade, celebrating the pride, craftsmanship and heritage that define both Kenworth trucks built in Ohio and America’s 250th anniversary.

== Products made ==
- Kenworth W900 (1974–present)
- Kenworth W990 (2019–present)
- Kenworth T600 (1985–present)
- Kenworth T680
- Kenworth T880
