= Kenworth W900 =

Semi truck

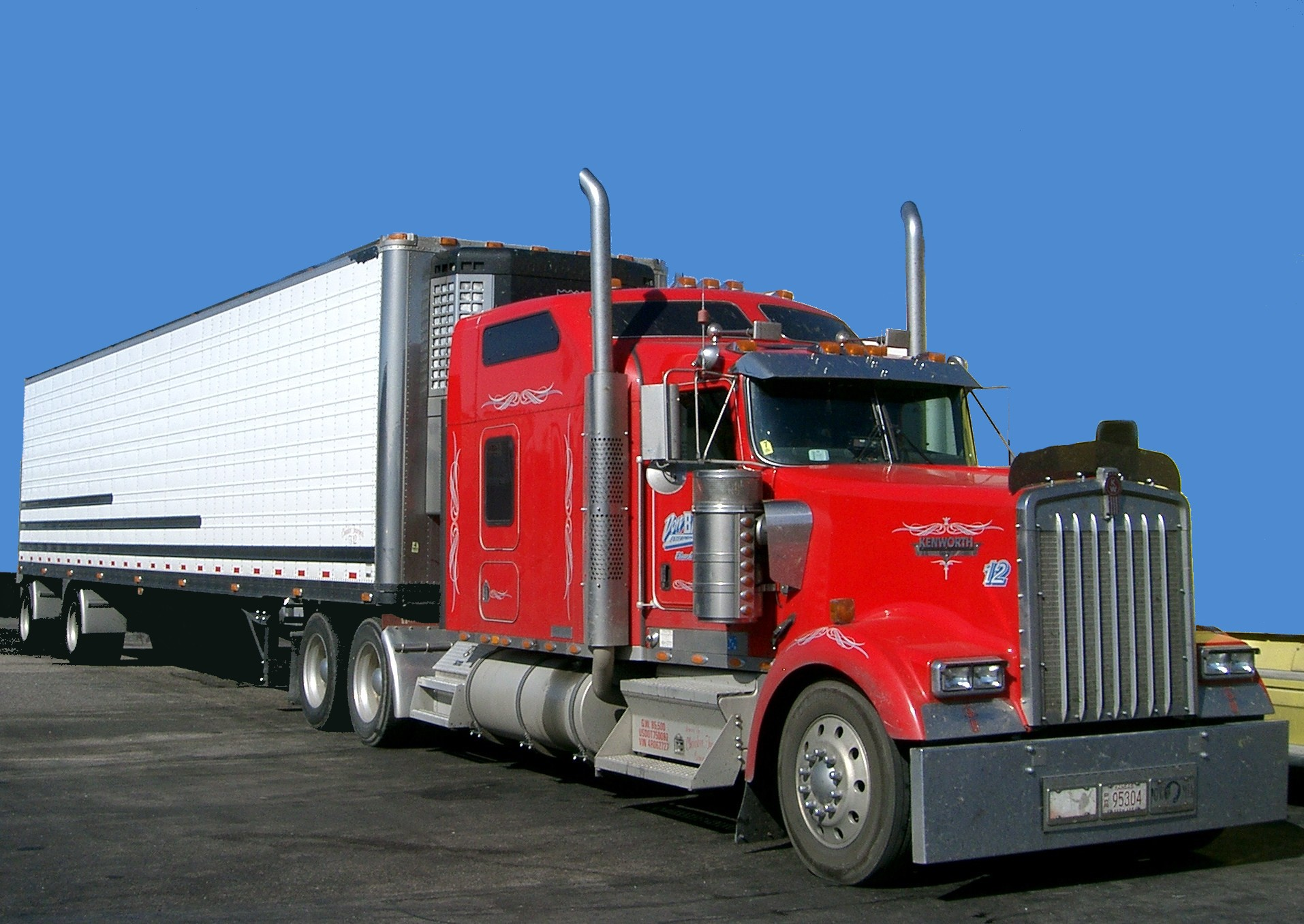

Overview
- Manufacturer: Kenworth
- Also called: Kenworth W900A Kenworth W900B Kenworth W900L Kenworth W900S
- Production: 1961–present
- Model years: 1961–present
- Assembly: United States: Renton, Washington (Renton plant); Chillicothe, Ohio (Chillicothe plant)

Body and chassis
- Class: Class 8 truck
- Body style: Truck (bonneted cab/conventional)
- Layout: 4×2; 6×4, 6×2
- Related: Kenworth K100; Kenworth T600; Kenworth T400; Kenworth T660; Kenworth T800

Powertrain
- Engine: 180–625 HP Caterpillar: 3406A,B,C,E; 3408PCTA,DITA; 3316; C11; C13; C15/C16, C-15; Cummins: N-Series; 275; Small Cam, L10; Big Cam (1-4); 444; N14; N14 Celect; N14 Celect Plus; K-Series; KT450/KTA600; M-Series; M11; M11 Celect Plus; ISX; Signature 600; ISX12; ISX15; X12; X15; Detroit Diesel: Detroit Diesel 71 series; Detroit Diesel 92 series; Detroit Diesel 60 series; PACCAR: MX13; MX11
- Transmission: Spicer, Fuller/Eaton Fuller, Paccar, Allison 4700 (vocational)

Dimensions
- Length: 160-280 in
- Width: 102 in
- Height: 132 in
- Curb weight: 16,700 lbs

Chronology
- Predecessor: Kenworth 500-series Kenworth 900-series
- Successor: Kenworth T900 (KW Australia); Kenworth W990 (KW US)

The Kenworth W900 is a model line of conventional-cab trucks that are produced by the Kenworth division of PACCAR. The replacement of the Kenworth 900-series conventional, the W900 is produced as a Class 8 conventional-cab semi-trailer truck primarily for highway use and is also made as a straight vocational dump truck. The "W" in its model designation denotes Worthington, one of the two founders of Kenworth. More than six decades after its introduction, the W900 is currently in its third distinct generation (introduced in 1982).

At its introduction, the W900 conventional was introduced alongside the K100 COE. As the Kenworth model line was expanded, the W900 became its flagship conventional, with its cab structure used across other model families. Through its production, the W900 has competed against a wide variety of model lines, including a rivalry between the model line and the Peterbilt 359, 379, and 389. Among owner-operator drivers, the W900 has remained a popular basis for truck customization, with owners adding additional chrome trim, lighting and customized wheels and paint schemes.

In 2018, Kenworth began the process of winding down the model line, introducing its all-new W990 flagship conventional. Sharing its cab with the Kenworth T680 and T880, the W990 replaced shorter-hood versions of the W900 model line. On March 19, 2025, Kenworth officially announced that it will end production of the W900 along with the T800W and C500 in 2026 due to changing emissions regulations and component constraints.

Since 1993, Kenworth has produced the model line at its Renton, Washington assembly facility.

== Background ==
In 1956, Kenworth introduced the 900-series conventional-cab truck, replacing the 500-series introduced in 1939. As with its predecessor, the 900-series shared the chassis of the Kenworth cabover, replacing the "Bullnose" Kenworth COE with the Kenworth K100. As before, a side-opening "butterfly" hood was standard, but a forward tilting fiberglass hood became an option for the first time.

In 1961, Kenworth introduced the W900 conventional as the replacement for the 900-series. As part of several major design changes, the cab was completely redesigned, raising the height of the cab roof and windows and mounting the two windshield panes together. To better allow for engine cooling, the radiator was widened slightly, with the tilting hood made standard. While the headlights remained fender-mounted, the housings were faired into the fenders.

== Model overview ==
For over 60 years, Kenworth has produced three basic versions of the W900 model family, making it among the longest-lived automotive designs ever produced.

The "narrow-hood" W900 was produced from 1961 to 1964; the "wide hood" W900A was produced from 1965 to September 1982. From late 1982 to the present day, the third-generation W900B has been produced (the "B" was later dropped). A heavy-duty W900S (sloped hood) was introduced in 1987; it is similar in appearance to the T800, except for its set-forward front axle and raised chassis. In 1990, the W900L (long-hood) was introduced, adding 10 inches of length to the hood.

=== W900 (1961–1964) ===
In contrast to the 900-series and 500-series Kenworth conventionals, the cab introduced "bulkhead-style" doors (with full-length hinges). In another change, the roof panel was changed from metal to fiberglass. While functionally different, the W900 retained the wide-style vent windows, with door handles mounted below the windows.

=== W900A (1965–1982) ===
In 1965, the W900 underwent its first major change and was renamed the W900A. To accommodate larger diesel engines, the long hood was lengthened several inches to further increase radiator size. For 1972, the doors of the W900 were changed, with the model adapting larger windows, and correspondingly narrower vent windows; for ease of use, the door handles were re-positioned to the bottom of the doors and changed from a lever-style to a pull-style configuration. In 1973, the Kenworth badging was changed, with a redesigned grille emblem and hood badging. In 1974, a 60-inch flattop double sleeper was introduced as a factory option.

In 1976, Kenworth introduced the Aerodyne sleeper cab for the W900A. Distinguished by its twin skylight windows, Aerodyne was the first factory-produced sleeper cab with a raised roof.

An 1974 W900A was in the 1977 movie Smoky and the Bandit.

After the 1982 introduction of the W900B, the W900 continued production in Mexico (Kenmex), adopting the latter model's rectangular headlamps.

=== W900B (1982–present) ===
During 1982, the W900A was discontinued. In its place was the all-new W900B. Though the B model was easily distinguished by the introduction of rectangular headlamps (round headlamps remained as an option). It also underwent substantial internal changes. To accommodate engine cooling and exhaust changes, the hoodline was raised, requiring the cab to be mounted higher on the frame. New modular electrical components were introduced, a completely new cab and sleepers, new frame, and many other features replaced or updated features from the A model.

Since its 1982 introduction, the W900B has been expanded into a three-vehicle series. In 1987, the W900S was introduced as a severe-service conventional, adopting the sloped hood of the T800. In 1989 an extended-hood variant of the W900B was introduced, increasing the BBC from 120 to 130 inches. A limited edition James Bond 007 truck (to commemorate the W900B model's appearance in Licence to Kill), was also offered in 1989. The long hood W900B variant later became a full-production vehicle called the W900L. Competing against the Peterbilt 379 and International 9300, the W900L became one of the most popular Kenworth models.

Following the introduction of the W900S and W900L variants, several functional changes have been made to the W900B (along with changes to the powertrain to comply with upgraded emissions standards). In late 1994, the W900B/900L received the AeroCab/Aerodyne 2 as an option (shared with the T600B). The Aerocab featured a raised roof and a full-width curved windscreen (in one-piece or two-piece configurations); the two-piece flat windshield remained available on standard-configuration day cabs. As an option, an extended-BBC configuration was introduced for day cabs (resulting from the design of the raised roof). The 86-inch Studio Sleeper was introduced in 1998; at the time, one of the largest factory-produced sleeper cabs ever designed. In 2006, the W900S received a curved windshield as an option for the first time.

In 2020, Kenworth began to pare down the model line, ending production of the W900S (replaced by the W990 and the T880S). Sharing its wider cab with the T680/T880, the W990 is an all-new design distinct from the W900. The extended-hood W900B and W900L remain in current production. Alongside the W900B and L, the B-cab models remaining in production are the C500 (Brute) severe-service truck and the 963 off-road extreme heavy-haul truck (2005–present).

==== 1998–2024 sleeper configurations ====
- 86-inch Aerocab Aerodyne Studio Sleeper (218.44 cm)
- 72-inch Aerocab Flattop or Aerodyne (182.88 cm)
- 62-inch Aerocab Flattop or Aerodyne (157.48 cm)
- 38-inch Aerocab Flattop Sleeper (91.44 cm)
- 42-inch Modular Flat-top (106.68 cm)
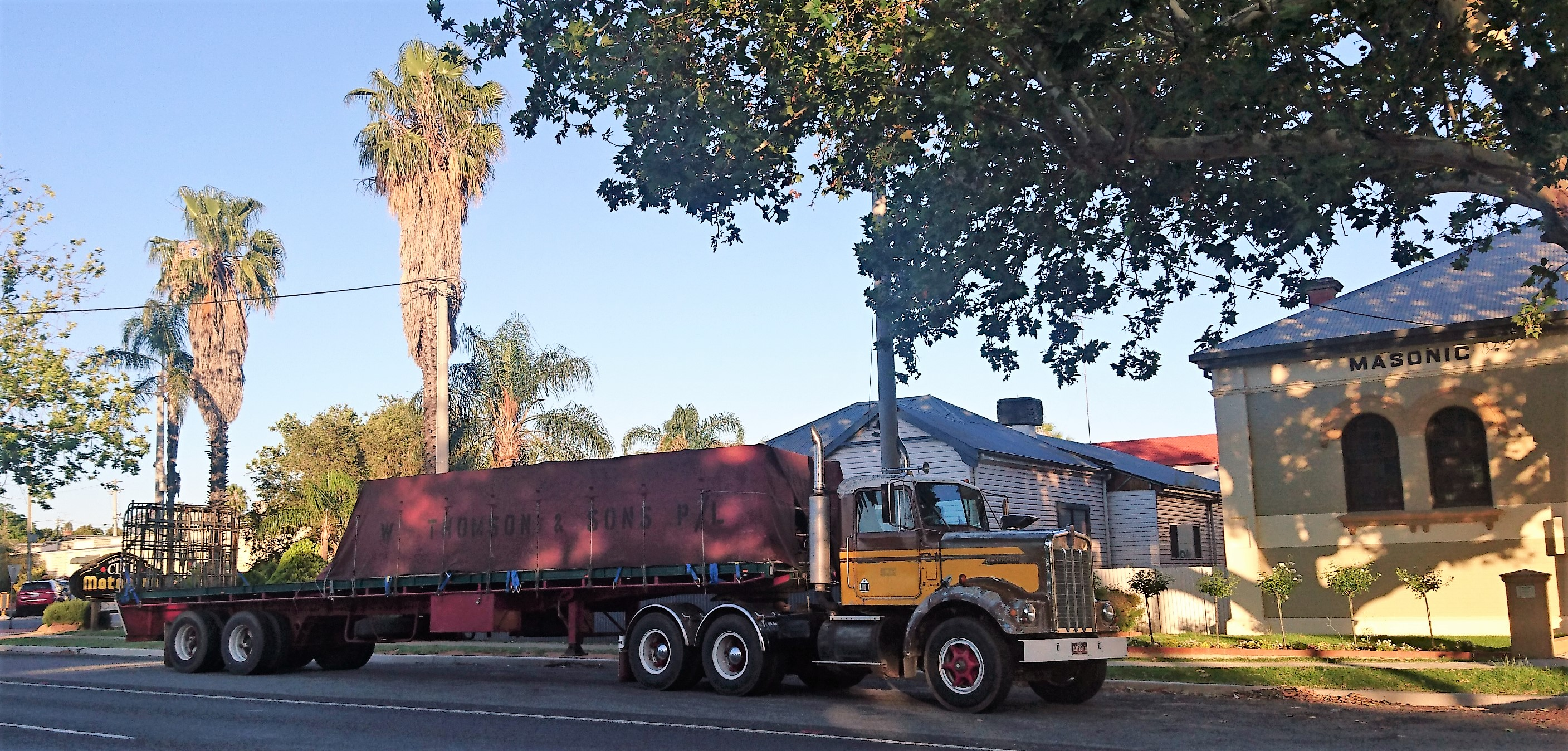
Pre-1967 W900 (updated doors)

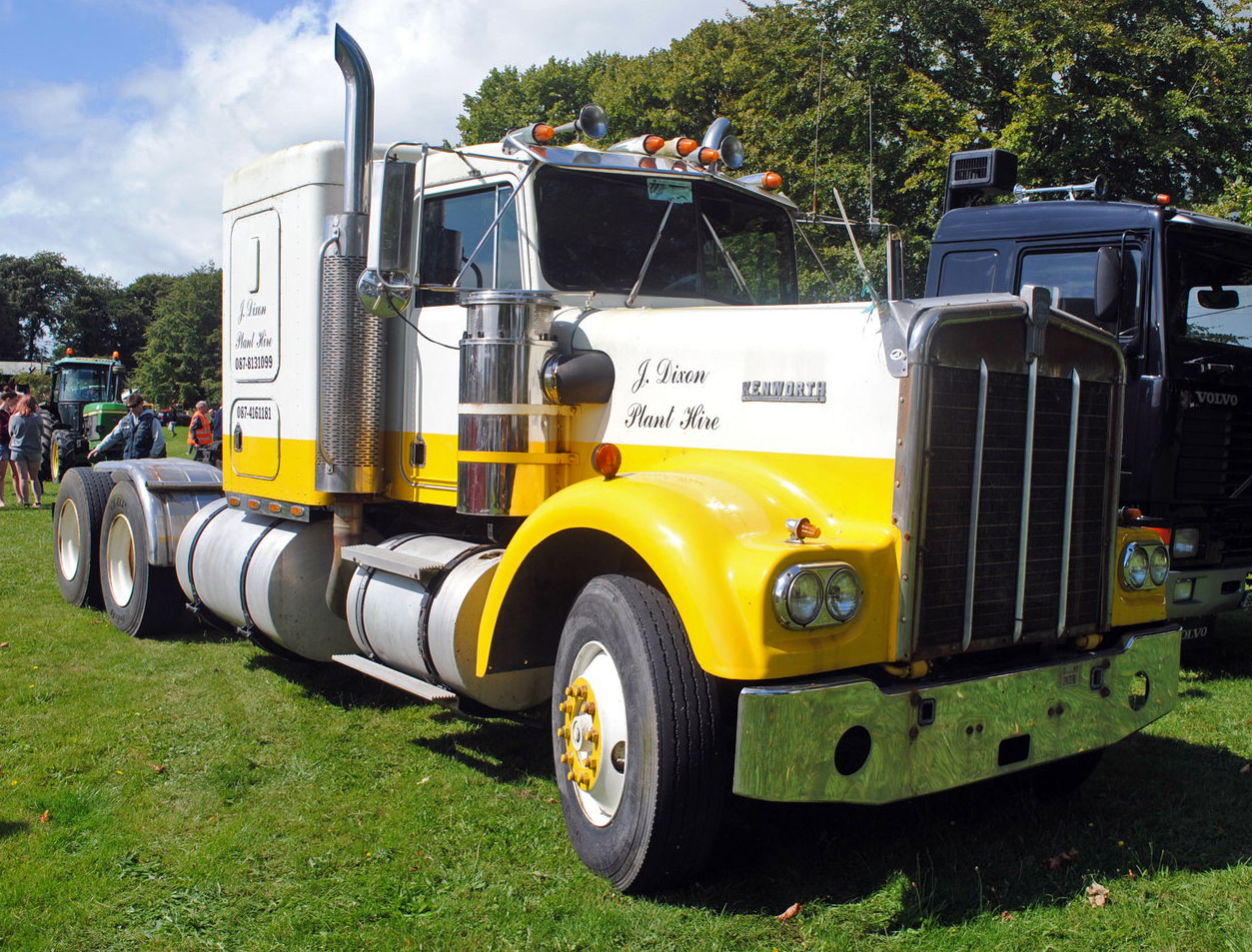
1972 W900A

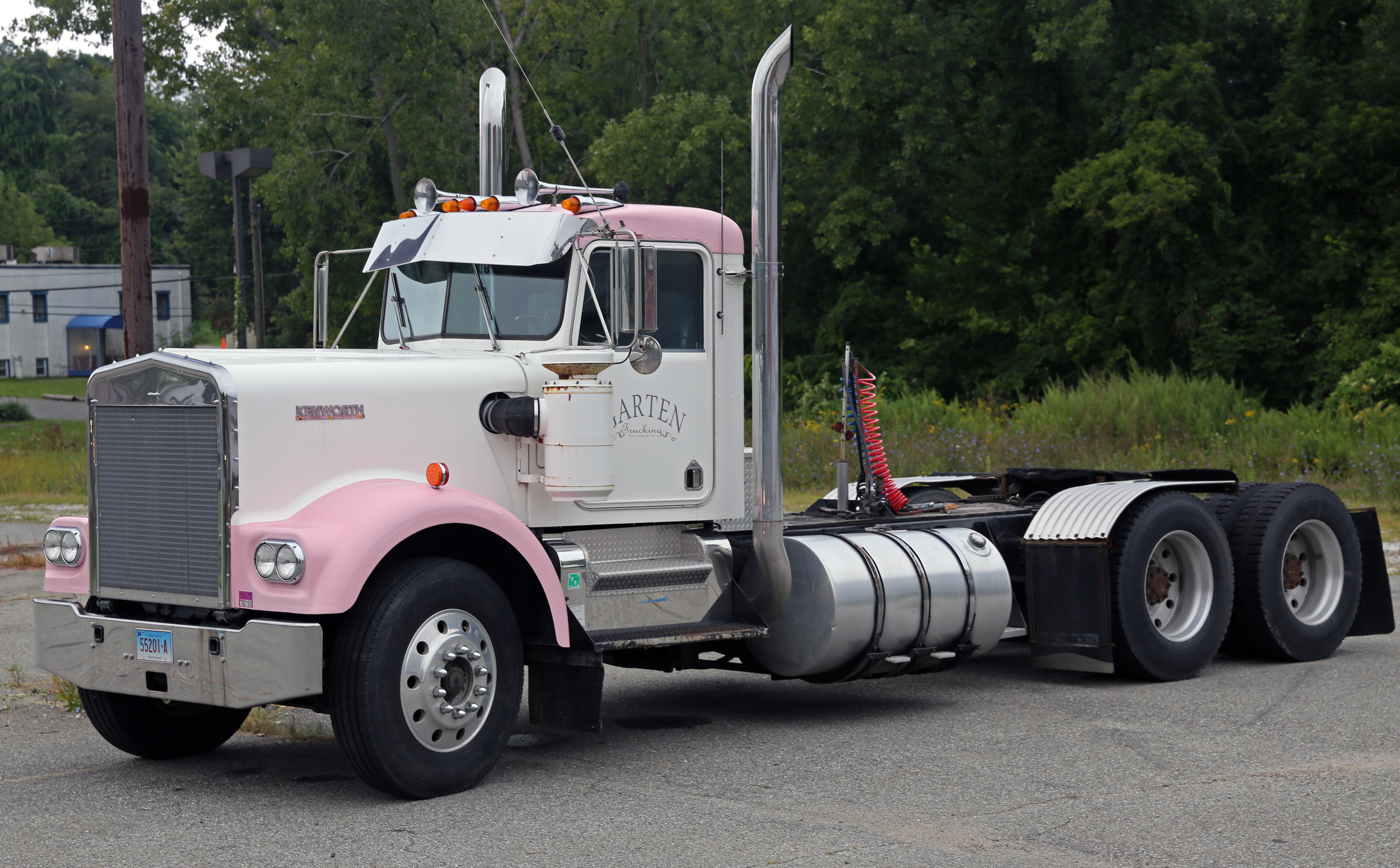
1973–1982 W900A day cab

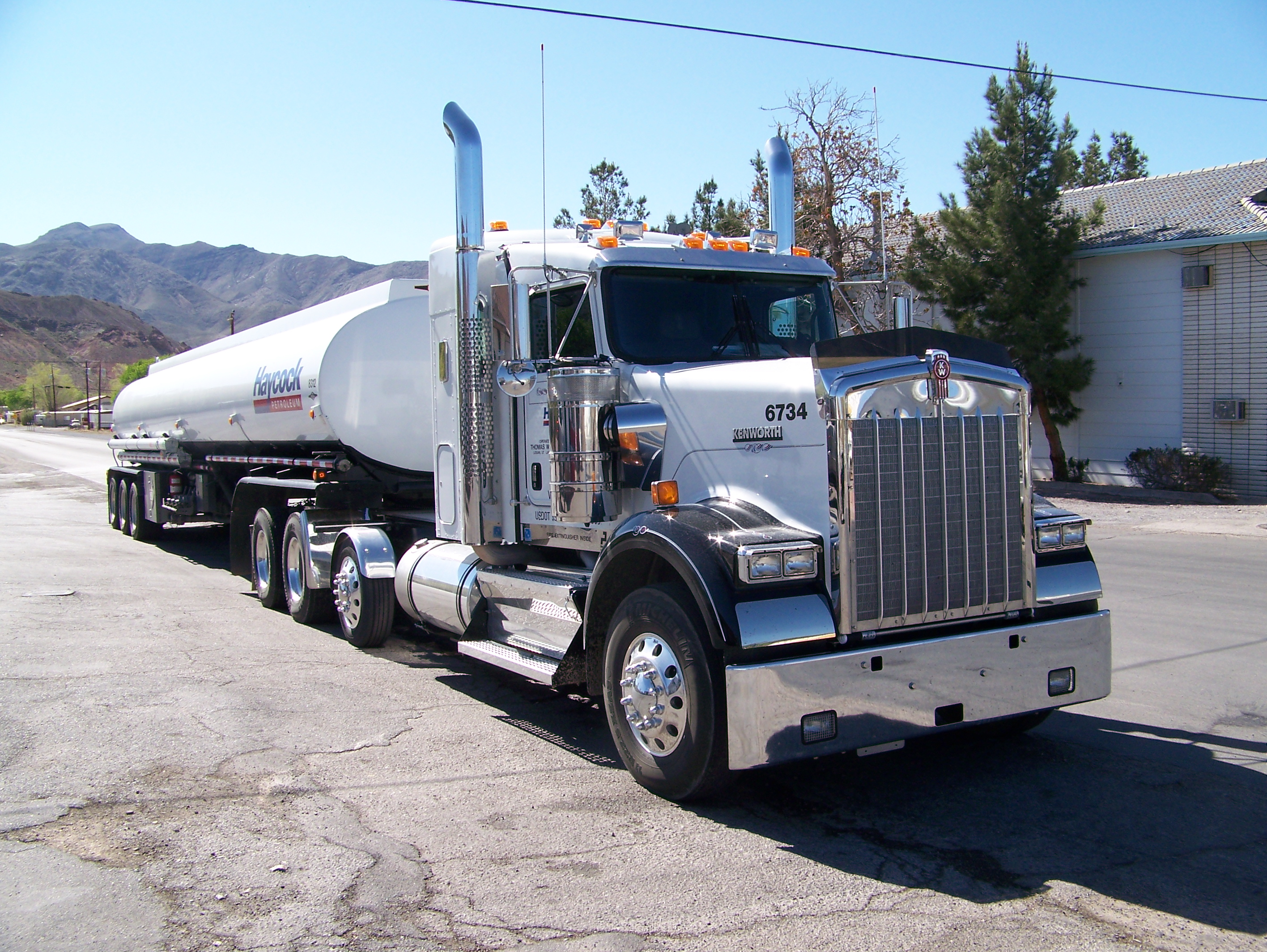
Early 2000s W900B Aerocab low-roof sleeper

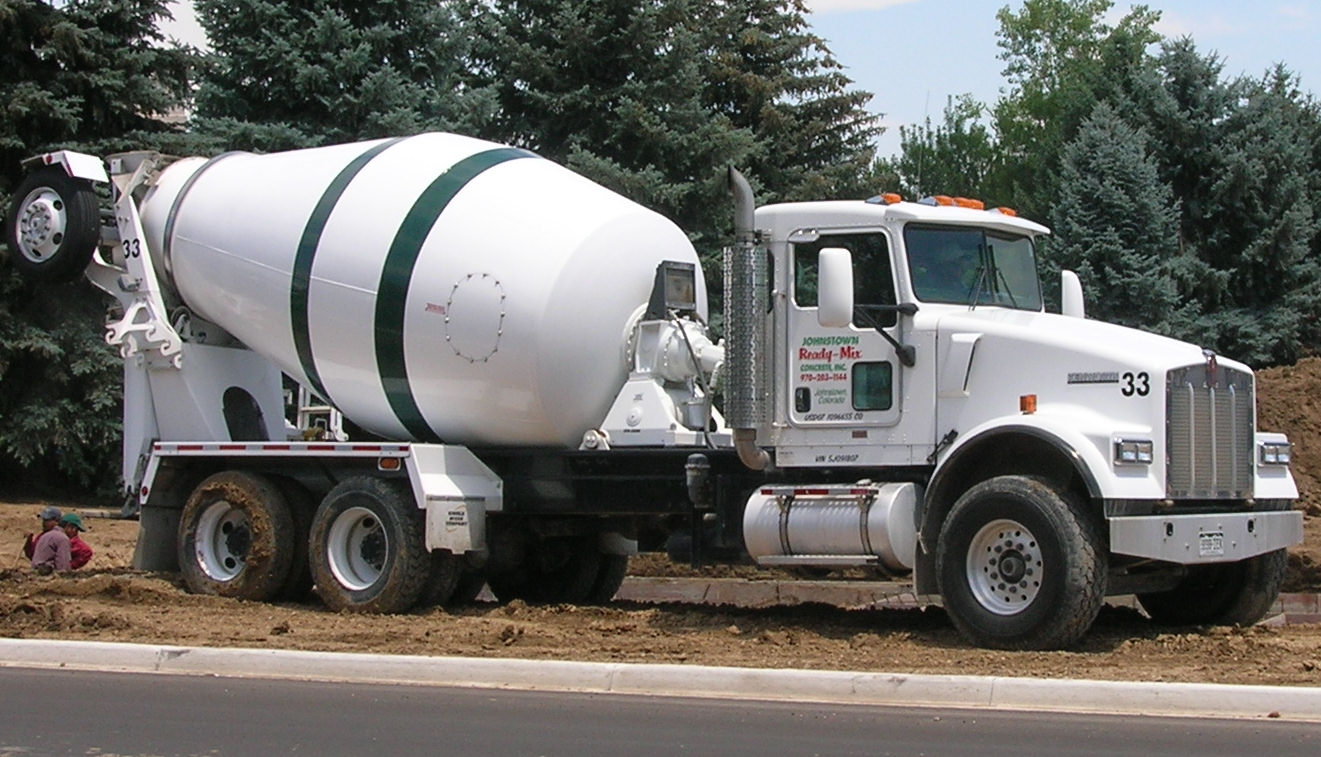
Pre-2006 W900S

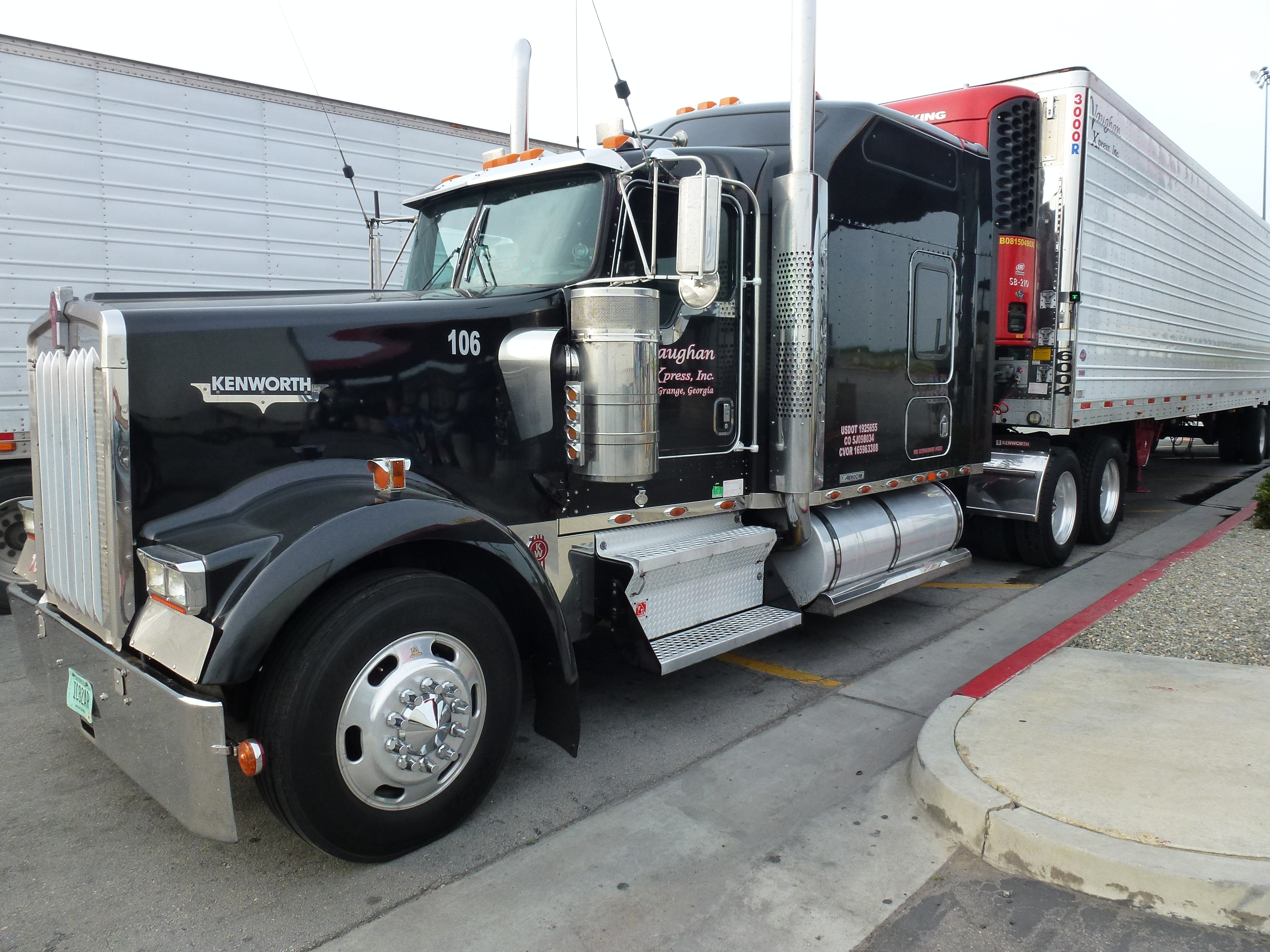
W900L with Aerodyne Studio Sleeper

== Variants ==
Structurally, the W900 shares commonality with a wide variety of Kenworth trucks produced in North America through a wide variety of applications.

=== C500 (1972–present) ===
Introduced in 1972, the Kenworth C500 is marketed nearly exclusively in severe-service configurations. Sharing its cab with the W900 (A or B, respectively), the C500 uses a model-specific chassis, offered with multiple axle configurations (including versions with twin steer axles).

=== 963 (2005–present) ===
Introduced in 2005, the Kenworth 963 is the largest truck ever mass-produced by Kenworth (replacing the 1958-2004 953, the final vehicle of the 900-series). Sharing (only) its cab with the W900, the 963 is a 6×6 vehicle developed exclusively for off-road heavy-haul use (primarily for desert oilfields), with the ability to pull up to 500,000 pounds.

=== T600 (1985–2007) ===
Introduced for 1985, the Kenworth T600 is the first semi-tractor to bring an aerodynamically-enhanced design to production, including a sloped hood, skirted lower body, and bodywork that closely integrates the front fenders and bumper. The T600 used the cab and frame from the W900B; to accommodate the sloped hood (which included internally-mounted air cleaners) and larger bumpers, the chassis adopted a set-back front axle configuration. Along with reducing turning radius by nearly 25%, fuel economy of the T600 was reduced by over 20% (in comparison to a W900 with an identical drivetrain). Marketed alongside the W900 for its entire production run, Kenworth would make the final version of the T600 over 25% sleeker than the original.

In response to the success of the T600 (by 1986, becoming nearly half of Kenworth production), other North American truck manufacturers introduced aerodynamically enhanced Class 8 highway trucks of their own, with the T600 facing competition from the Ford Aeromax, International 9400, and Peterbilt 377 by the end of the 1980s, along with the Peterbilt 372 and Freightliner Argosy cabovers.

Following the T600, Kenworth debuted a wide variety of sloped-hood trucks based on the T600 and W900, including the T400 regional tractor, T800 heavy-duty truck, along with medium duty trucks (the T300, followed by the T170/T270/T370/T470). While featuring changes to its front bodywork, suspension, and frame, the 2008-2017 Kenworth T660 (replacing the T600) shared its cab/sleeper commonality with its predecessor and the W900.

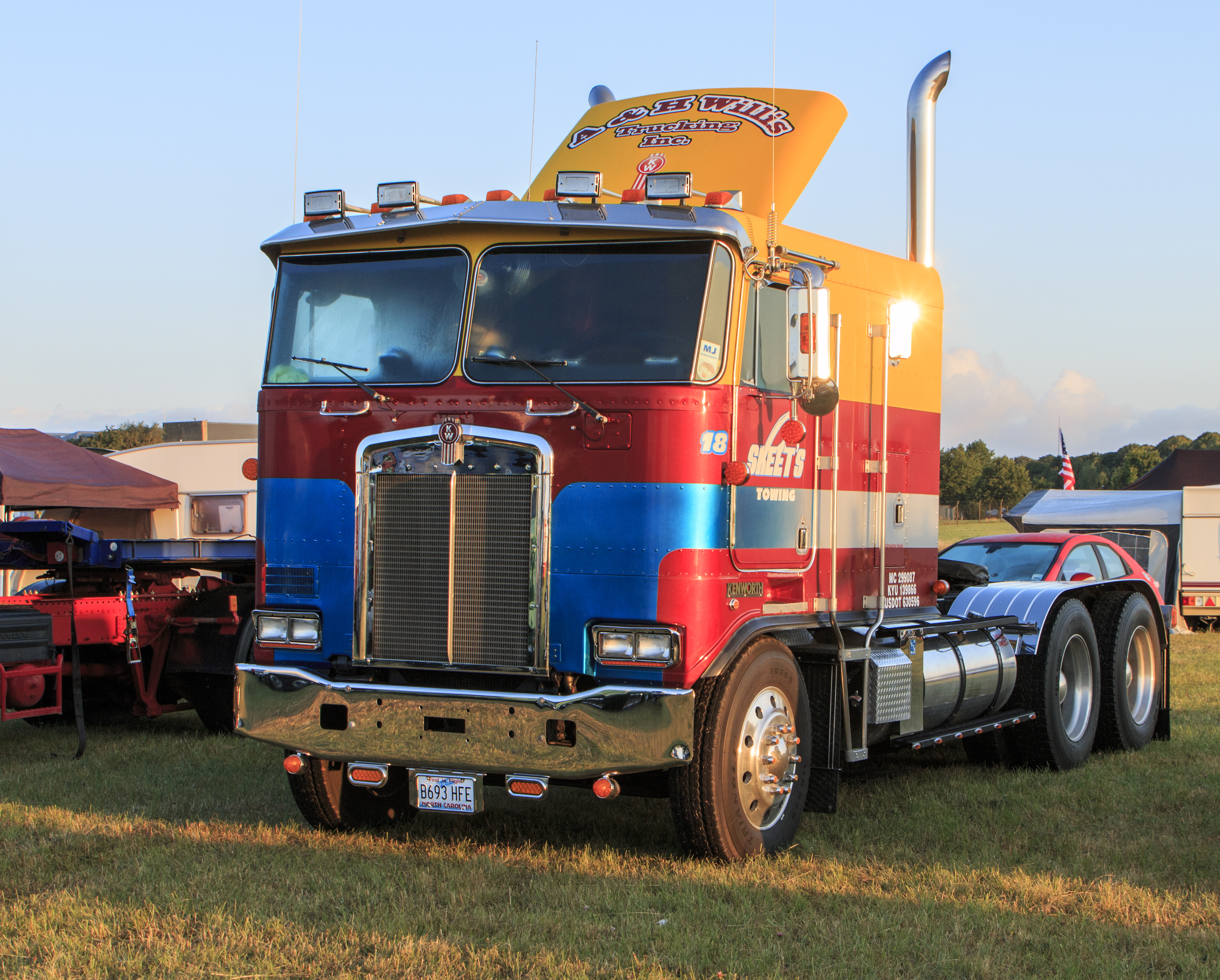
1990s K100E

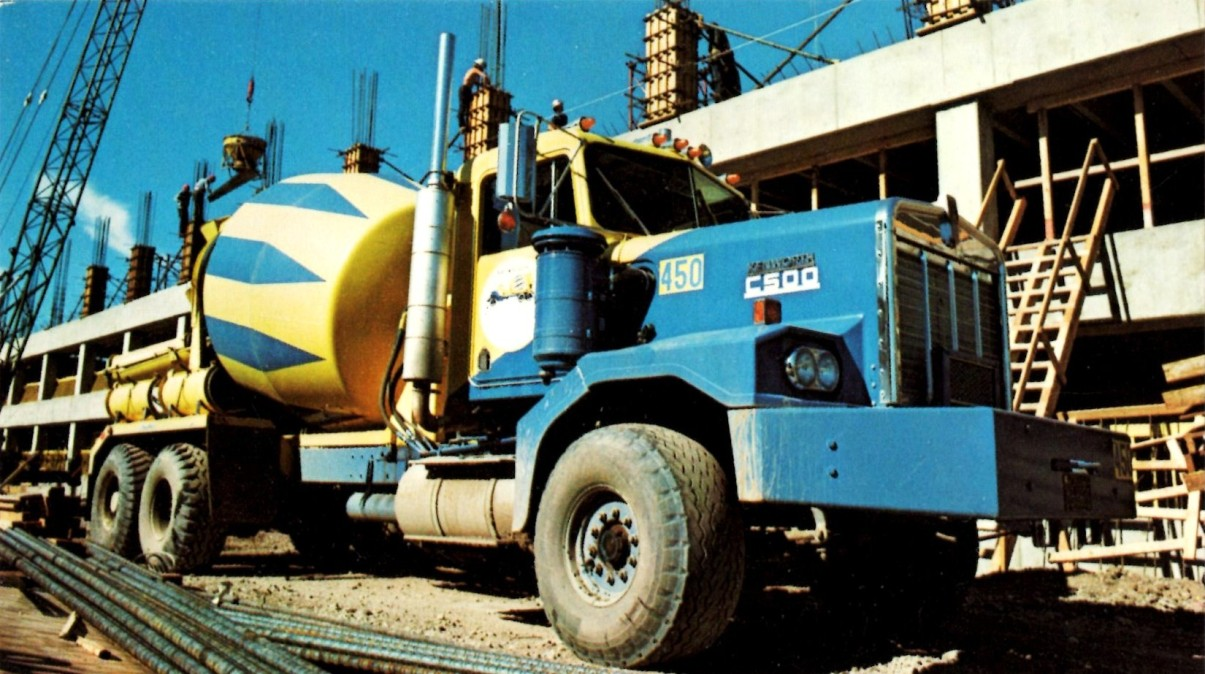
Kenworth C500

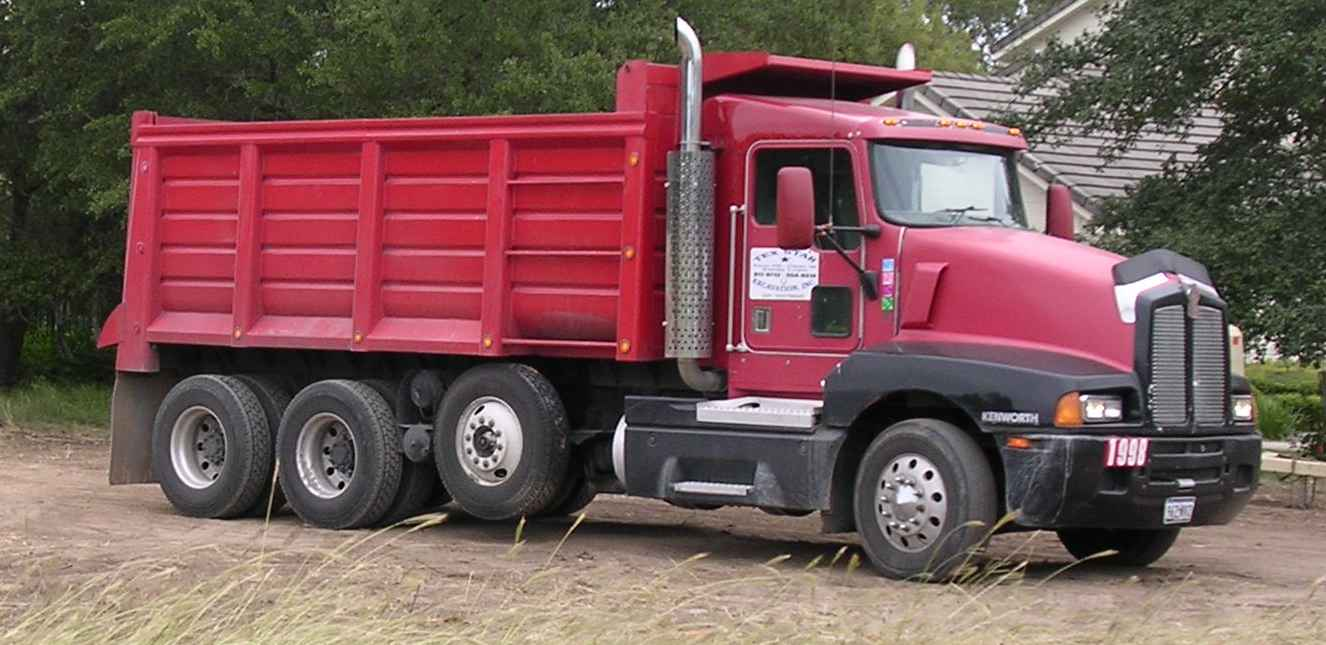
Kenworth T600B dump truck

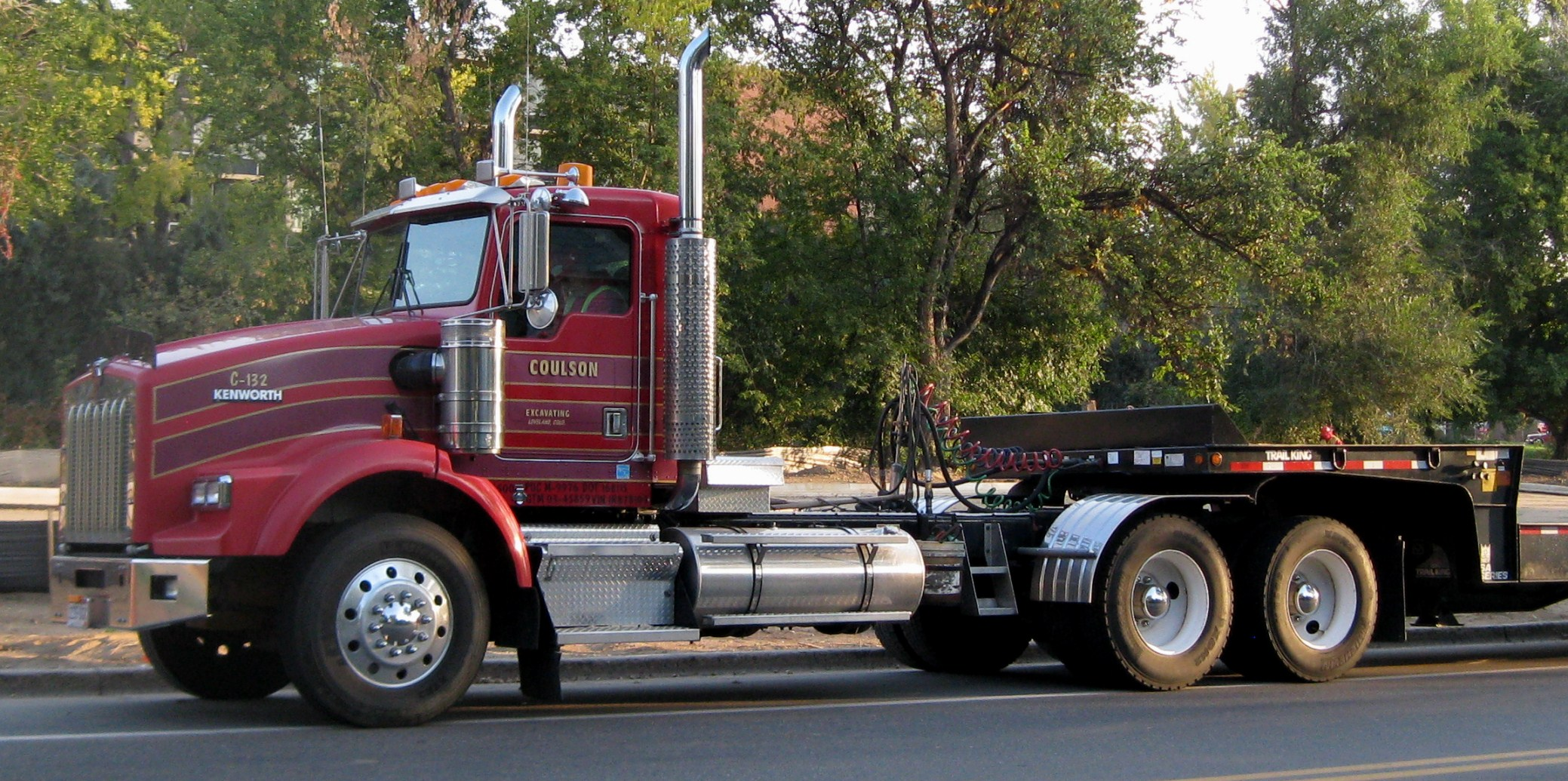
Kenworth T800 semi-tractor

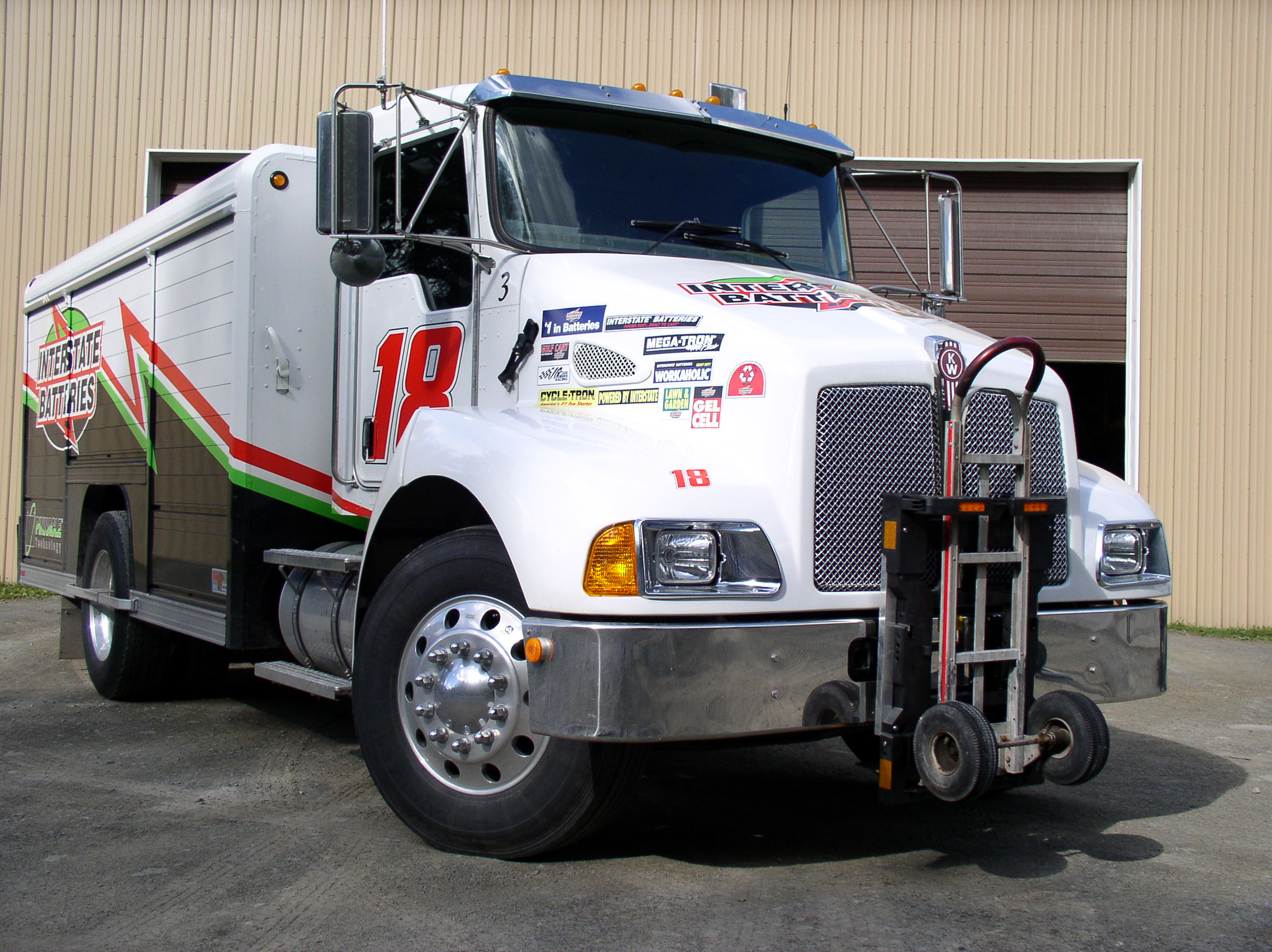
Kenworth T300 (medium-duty)

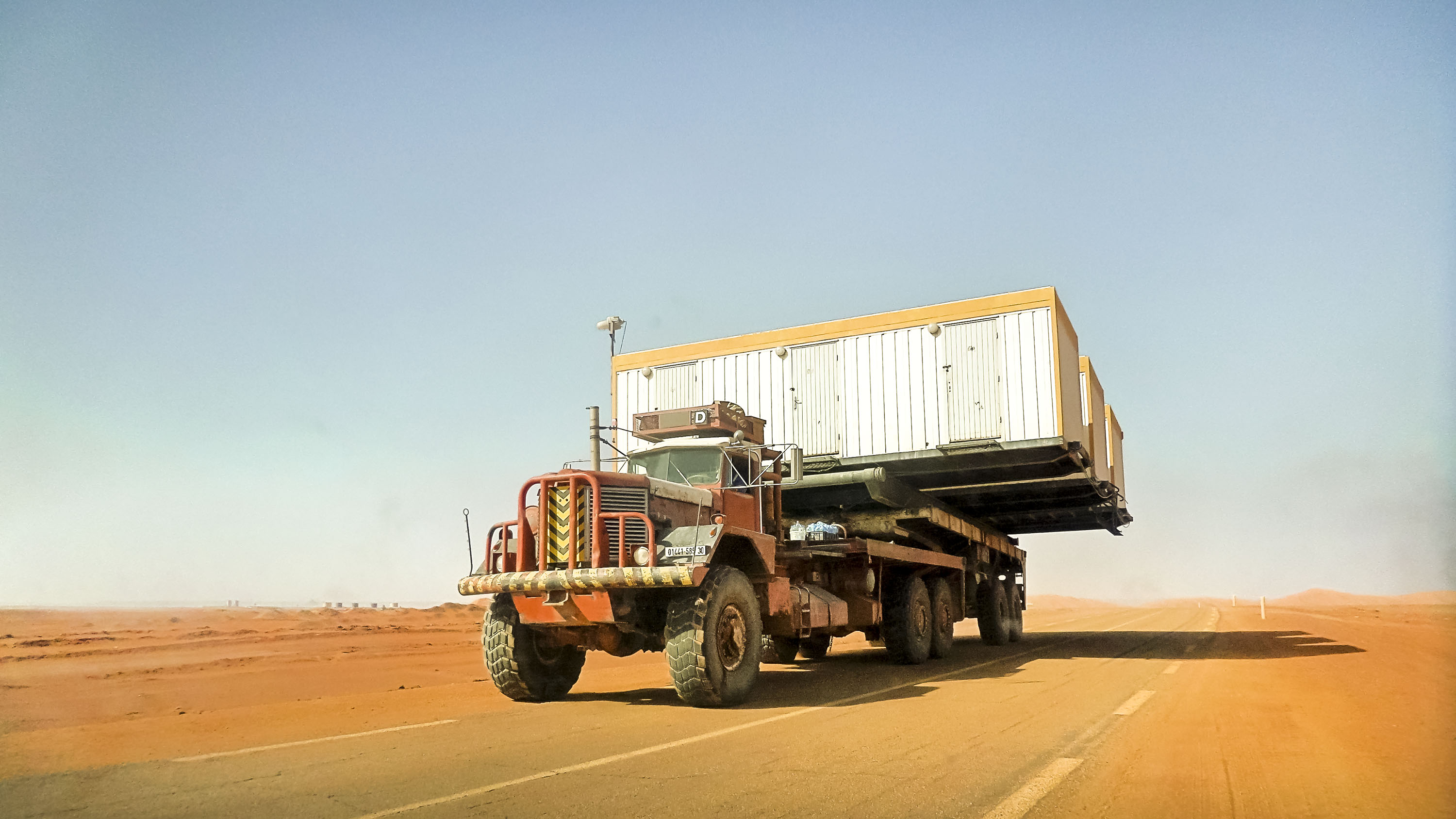
Kenworth 963

== Limited Editions ==
=== VIT ===
In 1974, Kenworth introduced a "V.I.T." limited edition (Very Important Trucker) for the W900 (the K100 was available with the VIT package in 1972). These were luxurious models, with diamond-tufted interiors, extra insulation, larger sleeper sizes, and numerous extra standard and optional features that gave the truck driver the ultimate in driving comfort and convenience. Eventually, the VIT package was offered in normal sleepers, and even day cabs. Taking the VIT another step further, in 1976, the VIT-200 was offered in both K100 and W900 models. These were the very first Aerodyne sleeper trucks, with raised roof and vista windows. Oddly enough, the VIT-200s only had the standard Splendor interiors, albeit with bicentennial exterior and interior colors.

From 1977 forward, the Aerodynes were available in either Splendor or VIT interiors, and sometimes even combinations of both, depending on sleeper size. While the 1976 VIT-200 was a limited edition vehicle, the VIT name remains in use by Kenworth to denote its highest-trim interior configurations.

=== Liberty Edition (1985) ===
To help celebrate the Statue of Liberty's 100th anniversary, Kenworth offered what were probably their most spectacular models, the Liberty Editions. Available on both the K100E and W900B, with a one-year run, these were dark blue, with red and white stripes. They had full VIT interiors, and were only available on the large sleepers (112" flat-top and Aerodyne K100E, and 60" flat-top and Aerodyne W900B). They had wooden steering wheels, and almost every available option as standard. Power was the Cummins BC4, or the Caterpillar 3406B.

=== 007 Limited Edition (1989) ===
In 1989, a W900B appeared in the James Bond movie Licence to Kill. To showcase its appearance, Kenworth produced a "007 Limited Edition" option package for the W900B. Adopting the same paint livery as the W900B from the movie, the option package was available for any version of the W900B, marking the introduction of the "Extended Hood" option.

Along with the specific livery, the option package featured several distinctive features, including gold-plated Kenworth badging, and James Bond "007" emblems. The interior featured a number of electronics features, including a TV/VCR combination, cassette player, CD player (with CDs including soundtracks from James Bond movies), and an 8-speaker, 300-watt sound system.

Coinciding with the 007 Limited Edition, the Extended Hood option was offered to all versions of the W900B, becoming the 130-inch BBC W900L.

=== ICON900 (2015) ===
On the 25th anniversary of the W900L, a limited-edition model was released: the ICON900. This model is available in limited production numbers and comes with nearly the entire catalog of chrome "brightwork" as well as unique badges to distinguish itself from the standard W900L.

=== Kenworth 100 (2023) ===
To commemorate the centennial of Kenworth, a 900-unit W900L Limited Edition was offered during 2023 production. Offered with the 86-inch Studio Sleeper, 72-inch Flat Top sleeper, and extended day cab, the interior was automatically upgraded to the Limited Edition Diamond VIT trim (in all-black). On the glovebox, each unit featured a special badge and their sequential build number. The option package included "Kenworth 100" badging on the sleeper exterior, sofa bed, seats, sun visor, and exhaust shields. A "Centennial" paint striping design was offered as an option (on sleeper cabs), with red frame rails and special-design "Kenworth 100" wheels included as part of the exterior.

Alongside the W900L Limited Edition, a T680 Signature Edition was also created to commemorate the 100th anniversary of Kenworth.

=== Legacy Edition (2025–2026) ===
A 1,000-unit final edition marking the end of W900 production, featuring vintage 1966 hood badges, Cummins X15 engine in legacy beige, and premium Diamond VIT interiors across multiple sleeper configurations.

== In popular culture ==
Through its half-century of production, the Kenworth W900 and its many variants have appeared numerous times on film and television. One of the most famous appearances of the model line is in the 1977 film Smokey and the Bandit (alongside the Pontiac Trans Am). Of the three W900s, driven by Jerry Reed, one example is a 1973; two are from 1974. The W900B was prominent in the 1989 James Bond film Licence to Kill; initially offered as a limited edition commemorating the film. Several W990s, along with some T680s, are seen in the 2021 movie The Ice Road.

In television, the W900 was centrally featured in a number of appearances. Claude Akins appeared in a two-tone green 1974 W900A in the series Movin' On. The W900 also appeared in the French educational television program C'est pas sorcier. Numerous B-cab models were prominent in the series Ice Road Truckers.

A black Kenworth W900 is driven by country singer Terri Clark in her "Dirty Girl" video.

A Kenworth W900 is seen in country singer Tara Thompson's music video, "Someone To Take Your Place".

The Kenworth W900 is also featured in the 2016 truck driving simulation game American Truck Simulator.
