= Sony Ericsson T700 =

Mid-range mobile phone

- Predecessor: Sony Ericsson T650
- Compatible networks: GSM/GPRS/EDGE 850/900/1800/1900, UMTS/HSDPA 2100
- Form factor: Candybar
- Dimensions: 48.0×104.0×10.0 mm (1.89×4.09×0.39 in)
- Weight: 78 g
- Memory: 16 MB Internal, 1 Memory Stick Micro slot, 512MB Memory Stick Micro included
- Rear camera: 3.2 megapixel
- Display: 240x320 pixels (QCIF+), 262,144 (18-bit) Color TFT LCD
- Data inputs: Keypad

The Sony Ericsson T700 was introduced in 2008 as a mid-range mobile phone. It is in color combinations of "Black on Silver", "Black on Red" and "Shining Silver".
