= Kenworth T600 =

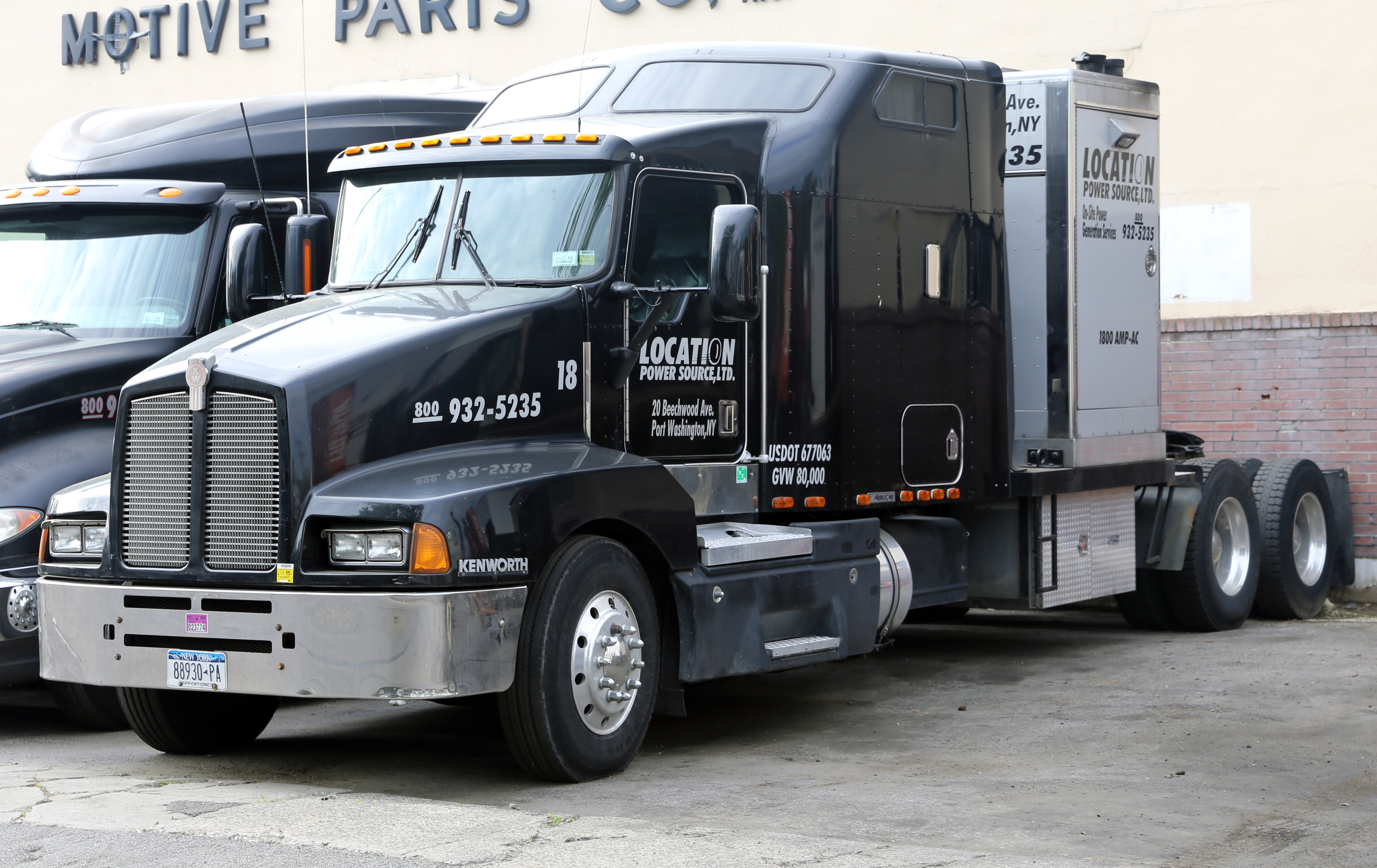
- 1995 Kenworth T600B

Overview
- Type: Truck
- Manufacturer: Kenworth
- Production: 1986–2007

Body and chassis
- Class: Truck (Class 8)
- Body style: Conventional (bonneted cab): Day cab; Sleeper cab
- Layout: 4x2, 6x4
- Related: Kenworth W900

Powertrain
- Engine: Detroit Diesel Series 60, Cummins ISX, Cummins N14, Caterpillar C15, Caterpillar 3406
- Transmission: Eaton 10-speed and 13-speed, 15-speed Allison 8 and 9 speed transmission

Chronology
- Successor: Kenworth T660

The Kenworth T600 is a model line of conventional-cab trucks that were produced by the American truck manufacturer Kenworth from 1984 to 2007. Distinguished by its aerodynamic sloped hood, the T600 was a Class 8 truck, typically sold in semitractor configuration.

While aerodynamic devices (such as roof fairings) had been introduced on Class 8 trucks in the mid-1970s, the T600 was the first American semitractor designed from the ground up with aerodynamics and fuel economy in mind. Sharing design commonality with the Class 8 W900, the T600 differs from its counterpart largely with its set-back front axle, hood, and lower bodywork (with the Aerocab later adopted by the W900L).

For 2008, the T600 model line was replaced by the T660. While sharing the T600 cab structure, the hood and lower bodywork of the T660 were extensively redesigned.

== Background ==
The Kenworth T600 began life as a response to the 1973 oil crisis (which affected diesel prices in a similar manner as gasoline). In 1976, design work commenced on building a semitractor that could reduce aerodynamic drag, thus reducing fuel usage. Due to length restriction laws, truck development originally began on a cabover tractor (similar to a Kenworth K100). In 1980, changes in length regulations allowed a shift from the K100 to the W900, greatly reducing frontal area.

To enhance the exterior design of the T600, Kenworth/PACCAR engineers experimented with scale models in the wind tunnel of the University of Washington. After wind-tunnel testing was completed, T600 prototypes were built using the W900 cab and powertrain as a starting point; the frame and front axle were modified with the T600 design and fitted with the newly designed T600 bodywork. During testing of prototypes at the PACCAR Technical Center, the design of T600 was found to be over 20% more fuel efficient than a W900 with a comparable powertrain. At highway speeds with an identical payload as a standard-body conventional, the lower drag of a T600 meant that it required an engine with approximately 100 less horsepower, further increasing fuel economy.

Following the 1985 unveiling of the T600 at a Kenworth dealer meeting, the T600 earned a strong reaction. Along with dealers and customers highly interested in its innovations and potential fuel savings, other truck drivers and truck spotters nicknamed the T600 "Anteater" (or other names less kind). By the end of 1985, the T600 became a success, itself alone accounting for 40% of Kenworth semitractor sales that year.

== Model overview ==
Along with its sloped hood, the aerodynamic design of the T600 semitractor utilizes several features that mark a major shift away from the Kenworth W900. To accommodate for the hood design, the T600 chassis uses a set-back front axle (a first for a Kenworth conventional). Along with a smaller turning radius (nearly 25% less than a standard conventional), the configuration allowed for designers to add longer front springs to the suspension, improving weight distribution and ride. Additionally, the lower hoodline would also lead to better forward visibility. In contrast to the cycle-style fenders utilized by traditional Class 8 conventionals, the T600 integrated the front fenders into the bumper, along with extending into the side fuel-tank skirts (standard on most versions of the T600), making the lower body work together to reduce drag.

=== T600A (1990–1994) ===
In 1990, Kenworth enhanced the design of the T600, renaming it the T600A. In what would become another distinguishing feature of the model line, the T600A redesigned the rear view mirrors, integrating the side view and convex mirrors into a single housing mounted to the cab (instead of the doors). To further reduce drag, the grille was redesigned, with the shortened W900 grille replaced by a twin-segment grille. The two flat windshields were replaced by a curved glass, available as one piece or two split in the center. In another change, the Aerodyne sleeper cab from the 1970s was replaced by the Aerodyne II sleeper. While also distinguished by twin rooftop windows (shifting to curved window class), the Aerodyne II sleeper was more aerodynamic. The T600A also received a digital dashboard as an option, developed in conjunction with Boeing.

=== T600B (1995–2007) ===
In late 1994, the 1995 T600B replaced the T600A. The sleeper was replaced with the new Aerocab sleeper, which integrated the cab and sleeper into basically a single unit, fully open between the two. The roof of the cab was raised upward several inches (to better integrate with the design with the Aerocab sleeper). Another change involved the addition of turn signal repeaters added to rear-facing portion of the front fenders.

In 1994, following the launch of the T600B, the United States Department of Transportation awarded Kenworth the National Award for the Advancement of Motor Vehicle Research and Development.

In 1997, the hood of the T600B underwent a functional change, changing from a one-piece to a three-piece design (allowing for easier replacement of front fenders). Following the introduction of the Kenworth T2000, the T600B was renamed the T600. During the 2000s, as with the W900, Kenworth introduced "Daylight Doors", replacing the standard door configuration with vent windows with a single-piece window with a notched forward section to provide additional forward visibility.

=== T660 (2008–2017) ===
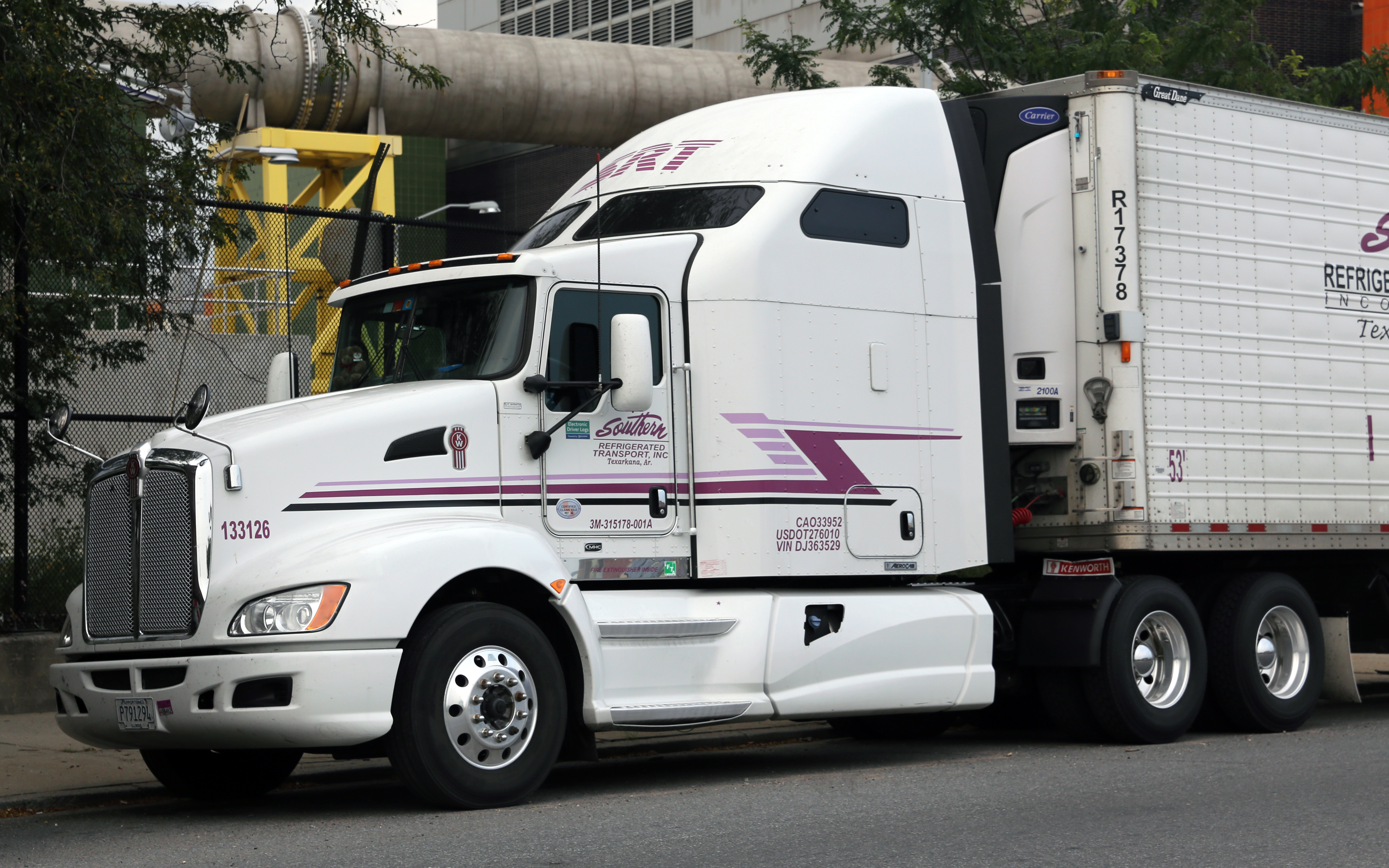
Kenworth T660

For 2008, the T660 was introduced as the replacement for the T600. Retaining the Aerocab cab/sleeper of the T600, in a major shift, the T660 adopted diesel engines produced by PACCAR. For the first time since 1990, the aerodynamics of the hood and fenders were updated, as the T660 introduced composite headlamps faired into the fenders while adopting a grille similar to the T2000 conventional. Front axle ratings ranged from 12,000–14,600 lb (5,400–6,600 kg) and rear axle options ranged from 23,000 lb (10,000 kg) single to 46,000 lb (21,000 kg) tandem.

Four sleeper lengths were available: 38, 62, 72, and 86 inches, with the high-roof Aerodyne available in the longer three and the low-profile FlatTop available in the shorter three lengths.

In 2016, Kenworth announced they were discontinuing the T660 in favor of the T680.

=== T680 ===
Kenworth T680

The Kenworth T680 is a class 8 truck model introduced in 2012. It is the direct successor to the Kenworth T700, and, to an extent, the Kenworth T660.

Engine Options:

| Name | Type | Displacement (Liters) | HP | Torque (Lb-ft) |
|---|---|---|---|---|
| PACCAR MX-13 | I6 Turbo Diesel | 12.9 | 380-500 | 1450-1850 |
| Cummins ISX-12 | I6 Turbo Diesel | 12 | 370-450 | 1350-1450 |
| Cummins ISX-15 | I6 Turbo Diesel | 14.9 | 450-600 | 1450-2050 |

Depending on engine options and the load in the trailer, the Kenworth T680 can reach up to 7.2 MPG. The T680E is the battery-electric version with 150 miles range. The T680 platform is also used in the Toyota hydrogen fuel cell trucks. The T680 is available with PACCAR MX-13, Cummins ISX-12 and ISX-15 engine options the ISX-12 and ISX-15 are the only Cummins built engines available for the T680.

== Gallery ==
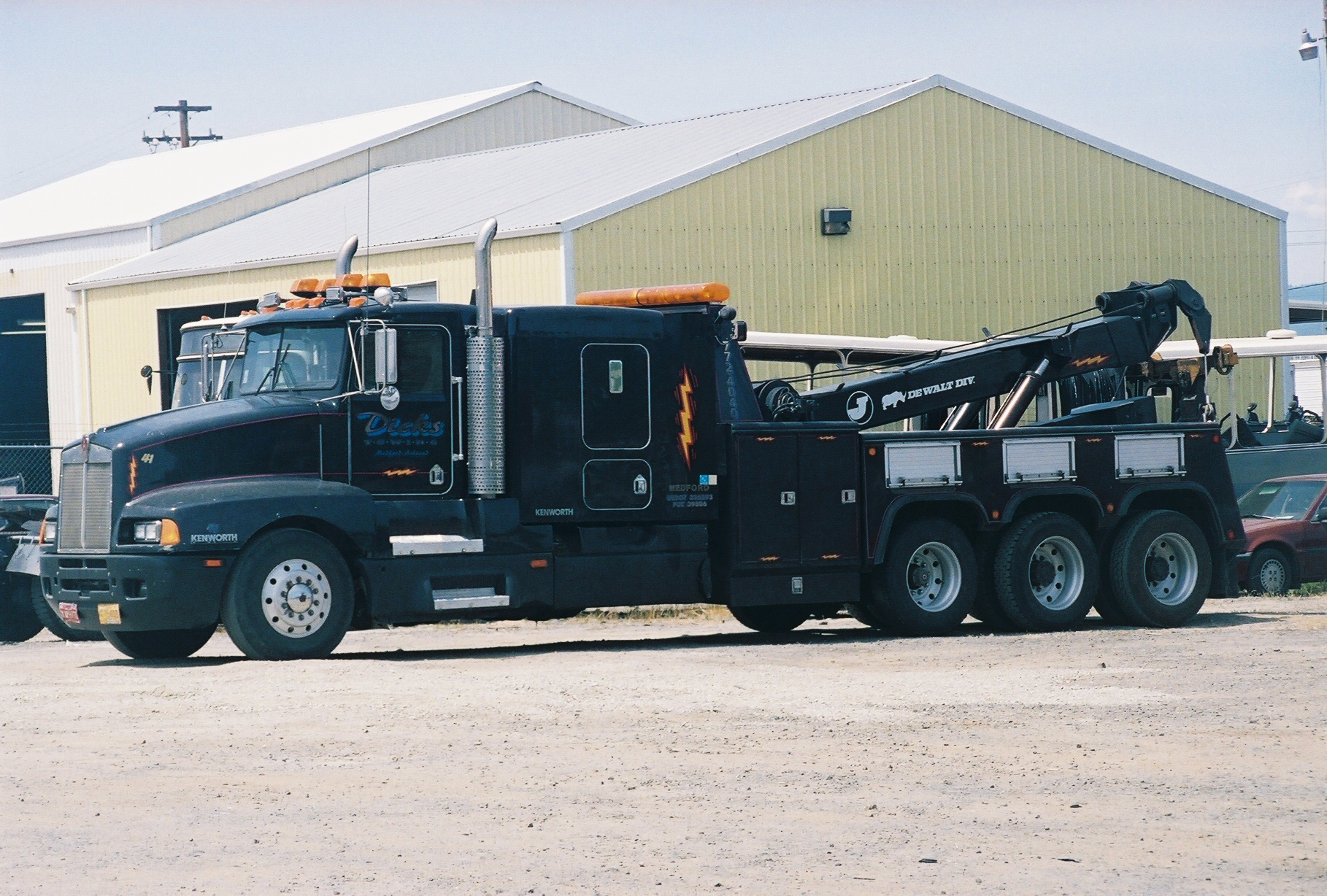
1987 Kenworth T600 tow truck

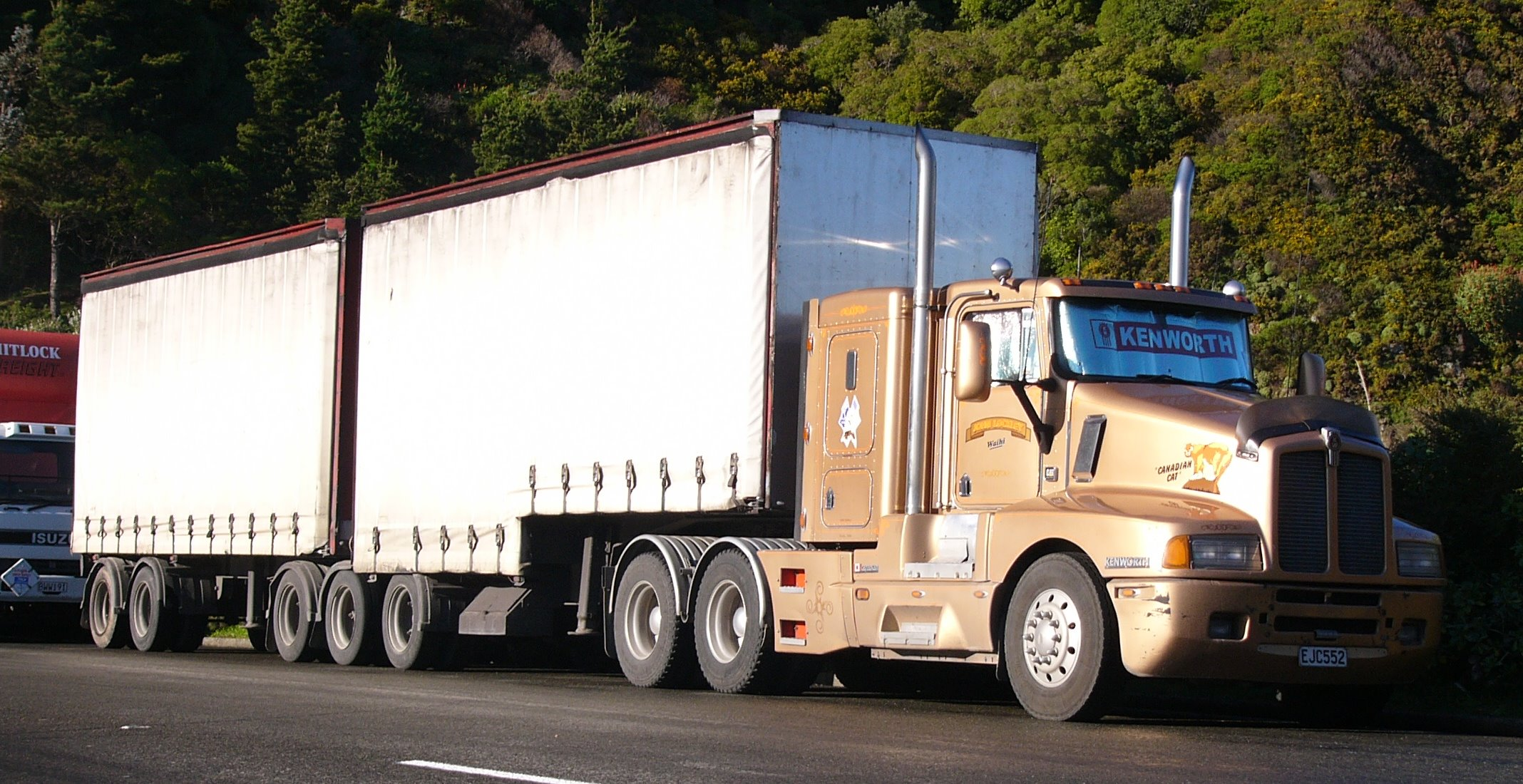
Kenworth T600A (New Zealand)

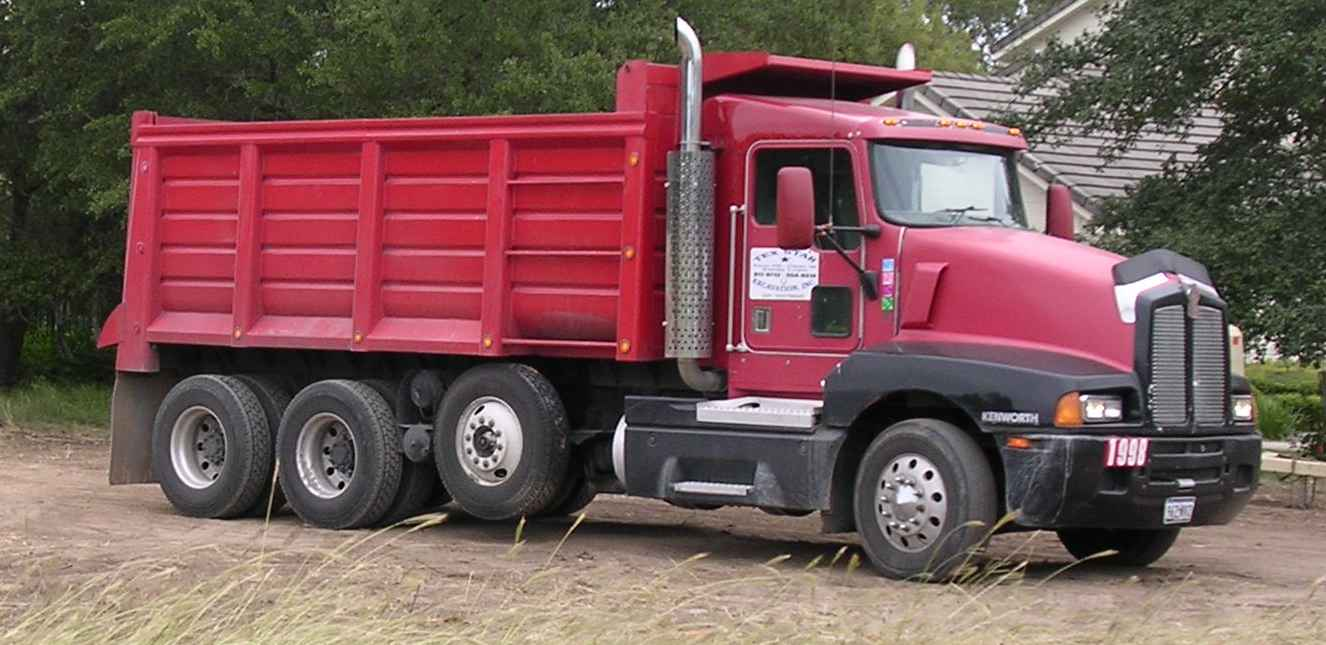
T600B dump truck

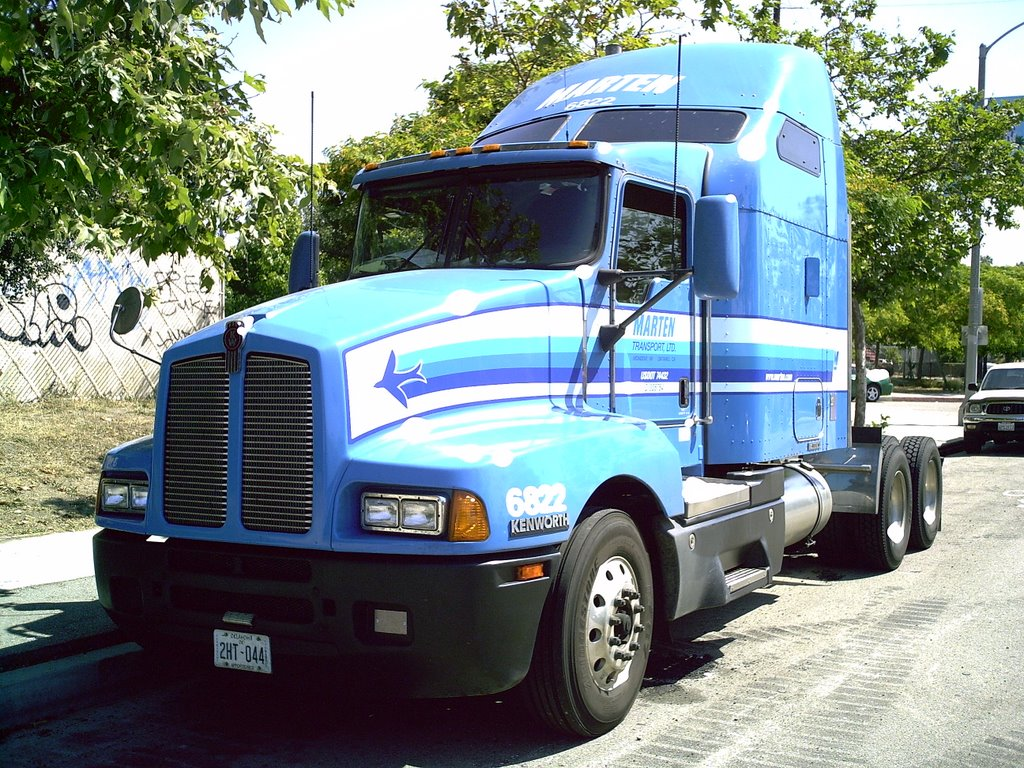
T600B with Aerocab sleepercab

== Variants ==
=== T400 (1988–1997) ===
The Kenworth T400 is a Class 8 variant of the T600 semitractor. Built with a slightly shortened hood (for a 112-inch BBC length), the T400 was designed for regional shipping and local delivery applications besides vocational use.

=== T800 (1987–present) ===
Introduced in 1987, the Kenworth T800 is a heavy-duty variant of the T600. Produced as both a semitractor and a straight truck, the T800 is distinguished by the T600 in several ways, including its use of round fenders, optional exposed air cleaners, and the use of a grille similar to the W900, the T800 is designed for multiple applications, ranging from severe-service applications, regional and long-haul shipping, most popularly used as a heavy hauler and dump truck as with its successor, the T880.
